= Storbreahøe =

Mountain in Innlandet, Norway

- Interactive map of the mountain

Highest point
- Elevation: 2,001 m (6,565 ft)
- Prominence: 109 m (358 ft)
- Parent peak: Loftet
- Isolation: 1 km (0.62 mi)
- Coordinates: 61°35′11″N 8°08′43″E

Geography
- Location: Innlandet, Norway
- Parent range: Jotunheimen
- Topo map: 1518 II Galdhøpiggen

Storbreahøe is a mountain in Lom Municipality in Innlandet county, Norway. The 2,001-metre (6,565 ft) tall mountain is located in the Jotunheimen mountains just to the north of Jotunheimen National Park. The mountain sits about 36 kilometres (22 mi) southwest of the village of Fossbergom and about 35 kilometres (22 mi) northeast of the village of Øvre Årdal. The mountain is surrounded by several other notable mountains including Loftet and Skagsnebb to the north; Sauhøe to the east; Rundhøe to the southeast; Sokse, Veslebjørn, and Storebjørn to the south; Kniven and Store Smørstabbtinden to the southwest; Storbreatinden and Veslbreatinden to the west; and Veslfjelltinden to the northwest.

== See also ==
- List of mountains of Norway by height
