= Austre Høgvagltindane =

Mountain in Innlandet, Norway

- Austre Høgvagltinden
- Interactive map of the mountain

Highest point
- Elevation: 1,916 m (6,286 ft)
- Prominence: 25 m (82 ft)
- Parent peak: Høgvagltindane
- Coordinates: 61°30′40″N 8°16′35″E

Geography
- Location: Innlandet, Norway
- Parent range: Jotunheimen

Austre Høgvagltindane is a mountain in Lom Municipality in Innlandet county, Norway. The 1,916-metre (6,286 ft) tall mountain is located in the Jotunheimen mountains which are located inside Jotunheimen National Park. The mountain sits about 41 kilometres (25 mi) southwest of the village of Fossbergom and about 33 kilometres (21 mi) northeast of the village of Øvre Årdal. The mountain are surrounded by several other notable mountains including Kyrkja, Kyrkjeoksle, and Langvasshøe to the northeast. Skarddalstinden and Skarddalseggje to the southeast; Rauddalstindane to the southwest; and Stehøe and Stetinden to the northwest.

== See also ==
- List of mountains of Norway by height
