= Storbreatinden =

Mountain in Innlandet, Norway

- Interactive map of the mountain

Highest point
- Elevation: 2,018 m (6,621 ft)
- Prominence: 90 m (300 ft)
- Parent peak: Loftet
- Isolation: 0.821 km (0.510 mi)
- Coordinates: 61°35′13″N 8°07′34″E

Geography
- Location: Innlandet, Norway
- Parent range: Jotunheimen
- Topo map: 1518 II Galdhøpiggen

Storbreatinden is a mountain in Lom Municipality in Innlandet county, Norway. The 2,018-metre (6,621 ft) tall mountain is located in the Jotunheimen mountains just to the north of Jotunheimen National Park. The mountain sits about 3 kilometres (1.9 mi) southwest of the village of Fossbergom and about 35 kilometres (22 mi) northeast of the village of Øvre Årdal. The mountain is surrounded by several other notable mountains including Loftet, Veslfjelltinden, and Veslbreatinden to the north; Sauhøe and Storbreahøe to the east; Rundhøe to the southeast; and Sokse, Veslebjørn, Storebjørn, Kniven, and Store Smørstabbtinden to the south.

== See also ==
- List of mountains of Norway by height
