= Gravdalstinden =

Mountain in Innlandet, Norway

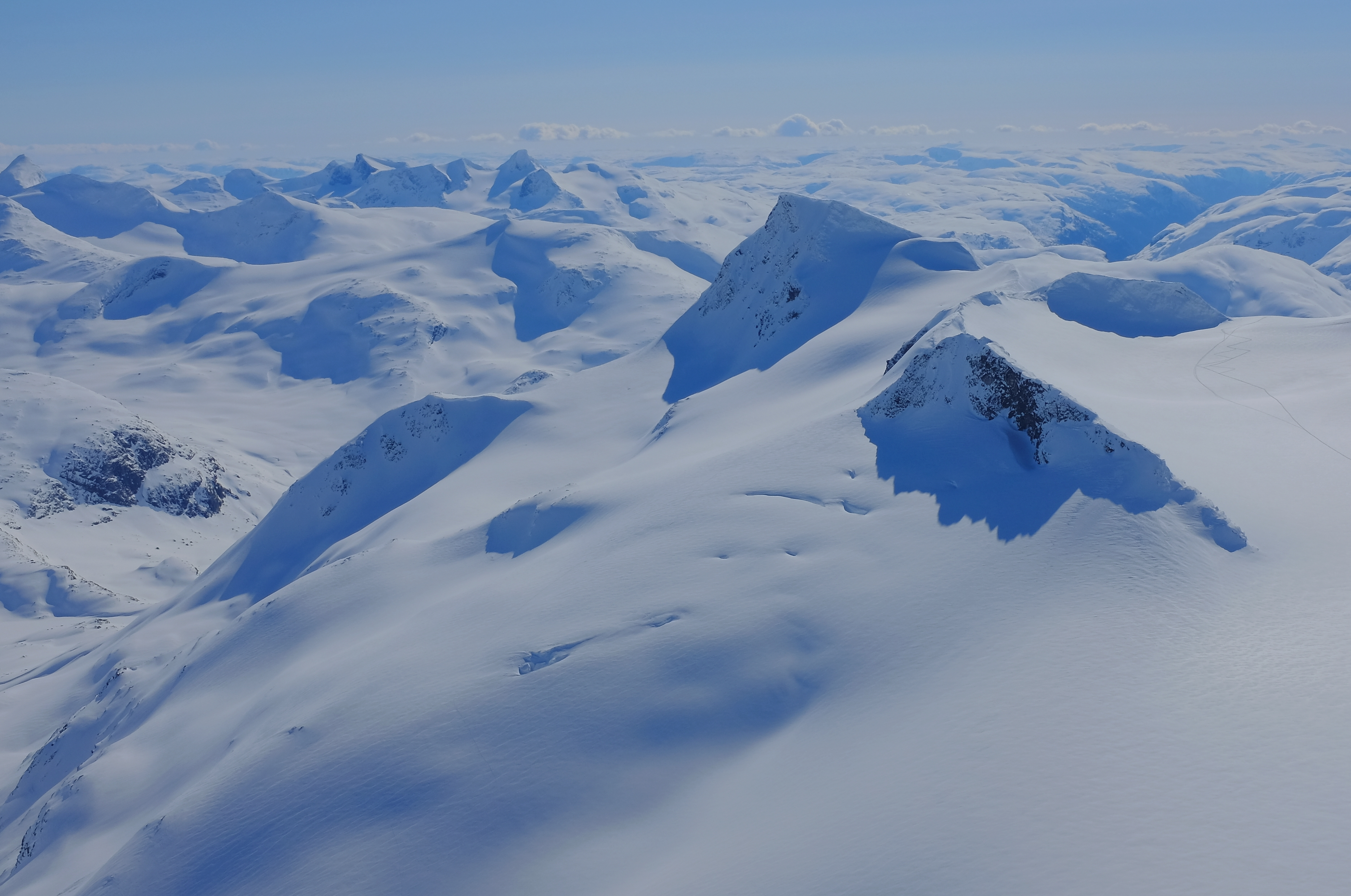

Highest point
- Elevation: 2,115 m (6,939 ft)
- Prominence: 251 m (823 ft)
- Parent peak: Storebjørn
- Isolation: 2.9 km (1.8 mi) to Storebjørn
- Coordinates: 61°31′22″N 8°07′03″E

Geography
- Interactive map of the mountain
- Location: Innlandet, Norway
- Parent range: Jotunheimen
- Topo map: 1518 II Galdhøpiggen

Gravdalstinden is a mountain on the border of Luster Municipality in Vestland county and Lom Municipality in Innlandet county, Norway. The 2,115-metre (6,939 ft) tall mountain is located in the Jotunheimen mountains within Jotunheimen National Park. The mountain sits about 43 kilometres (27 mi) southwest of the village of Fossbergom and about 30 kilometres (19 mi) northeast of the village of Øvre Årdal. The mountain is surrounded by several other notable mountains including Fannaråki to the west; Smørstabbtindene, Storebjørn, Veslebjørn, Sokse, and Kniven to the north; Stetinden and Stehøe to the northeast; and Høgvagltindane and Kyrkja to the east.

== See also ==
- List of mountains of Norway by height
