= Sauhøe =

Mountain in Innlandet, Norway

- Interactive map of the mountain

Highest point
- Elevation: 1,773 m (5,817 ft)
- Prominence: 76 m (249 ft)
- Parent peak: Galdhøpiggen
- Isolation: 1.4 km (0.87 mi)
- Coordinates: 61°36′04″N 8°12′21″E

Geography
- Location: Innlandet, Norway
- Parent range: Jotunheimen
- Topo map: 1518 II Galdhøpiggen

Sauhøe is a mountain in Lom Municipality in Innlandet county, Norway. The 1,773-metre (5,817 ft) tall mountain is located in the Jotunheimen mountains on the border of Jotunheimen National Park. The mountain sits about 32 kilometres (20 mi) southwest of the village of Fossbergom and about 40 kilometres (25 mi) northeast of the village of Øvre Årdal. The mountain is surrounded by several other notable mountains including Bukkehøe and Lindbergtinden to the east; Bukkeholstindane and Tverrbottindene to the southeast; Stetinden and Stehøe to the south; Rundhøe to the southwest; Storbreahøe, Storbreatinden, Veslbreatinden, and Skagsnebb to the west, and Loftet to the northwest.

== See also ==
- List of mountains of Norway by height
