= Saksi (disambiguation) =

Saksi may refer to:

== Television/Media ==
- Saksi, a Philippine television late-night news broadcasting program of GMA Network.
- Saksi sa Dobol B, a Philippine morning news and talk program on DZBB-AM.
- Saksi Kunci, an Indonesian television crime news broadcasting program of Kompas TV.

== People ==
- Saksi Sbong, a Cambodian actress

== Periodical ==
- Saksi (magazine), biweekly muslim magazine in Indonesia published from 1998 to 2006

== Places ==
- Saksi, Estonia, a village in Tapa Parish, Lääne-Viru county, Estonia
  - Saksi Parish, a former municipality in Lääne-Viru county, Estonia
- Saksi (mountain), a mountain in Lom municipality in Innlandet county, Norway
- Saksı, Pasinler, a neighbourhood in the Pasinler District of Erzurum Province, Turkey

== See also ==
- Sakshi (disambiguation)
