= Skarddalseggje =

Mountain in Innlandet, Norway

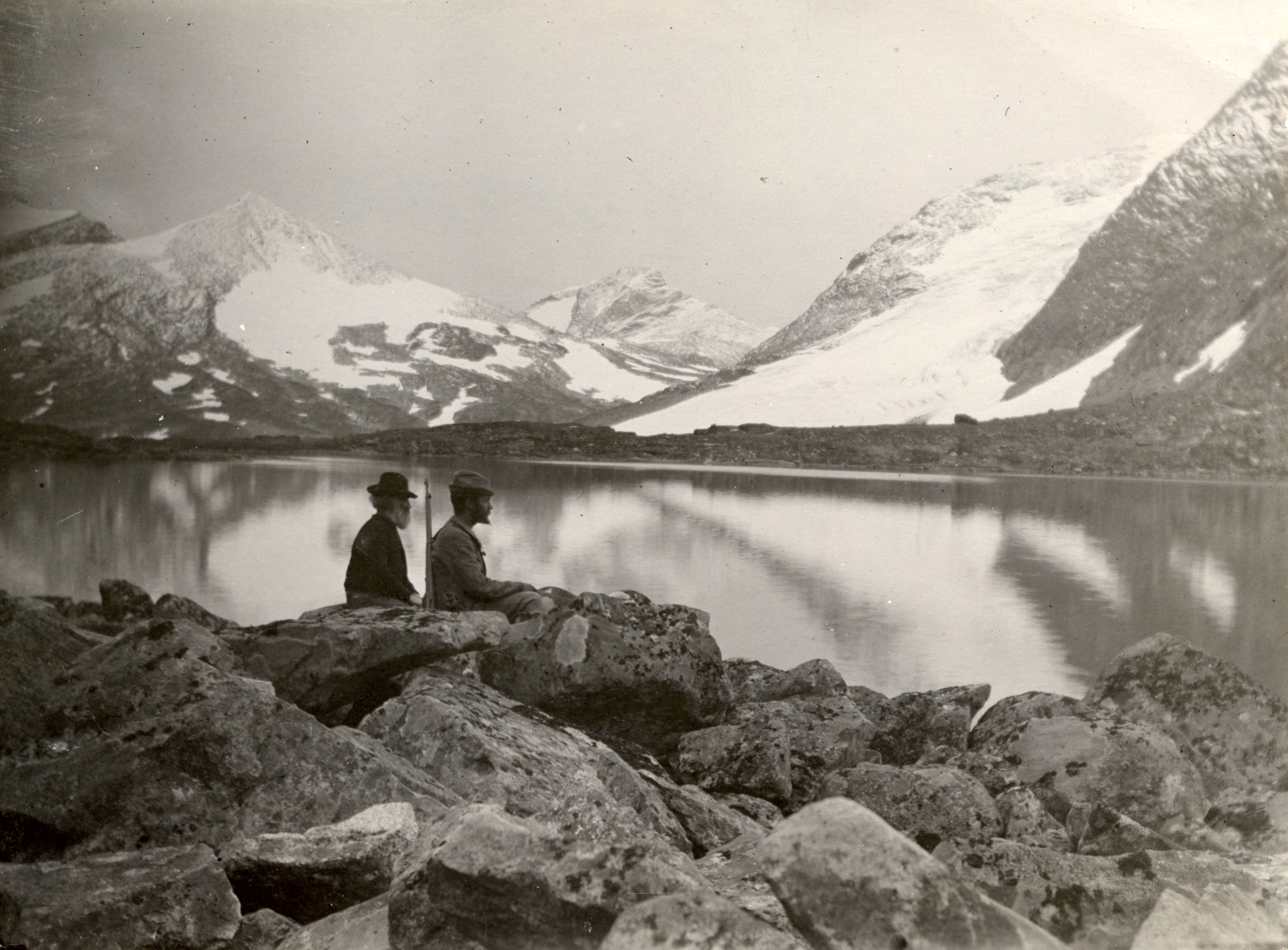
- Øvre Høgvagltjønn, with the following peaks from the left: Skarddalstinden (partly), Skarddalseggje, Rauddalseggi (in the background), Austre Høgvagltind (partly). You can also see an arm of the Høgvagl glacier.

Highest point
- Elevation: 2,161 m (7,090 ft)
- Prominence: 472 m (1,549 ft)
- Parent peak: Store Rauddalseggje
- Isolation: 2.5 km (1.6 mi) to Store Rauddalseggje
- Coordinates: 61°29′07″N 8°20′22″E

Geography
- Interactive map of the mountain
- Location: Innlandet, Norway
- Parent range: Jotunheimen
- Topo map: 1517 I Tyin

Skarddalseggje is a mountain in Lom Municipality in Innlandet county, Norway. The 2,161-metre (7,090 ft) tall mountain is located in the Jotunheimen mountains within Jotunheimen National Park. The mountain sits about 40 kilometres (25 mi) south of the village of Fossbergom and about 32 kilometres (20 mi) northeast of the village of Øvre Årdal. The mountain is surrounded by several other notable mountains including Storådalshøe to the east; Store Rauddalseggje to the south; Skarddalstinden to the west; Austre Høgvagltinden and Høgvagltindane to the northwest; Kyrkja, Kyrkjeoksle, Langvasshøe, and Visbreatinden to the north; and Urdadalstindan and Semeltinden to the northeast.

== See also ==
- List of mountains of Norway by height
