= Store Rauddalseggje =

Mountain in Norway

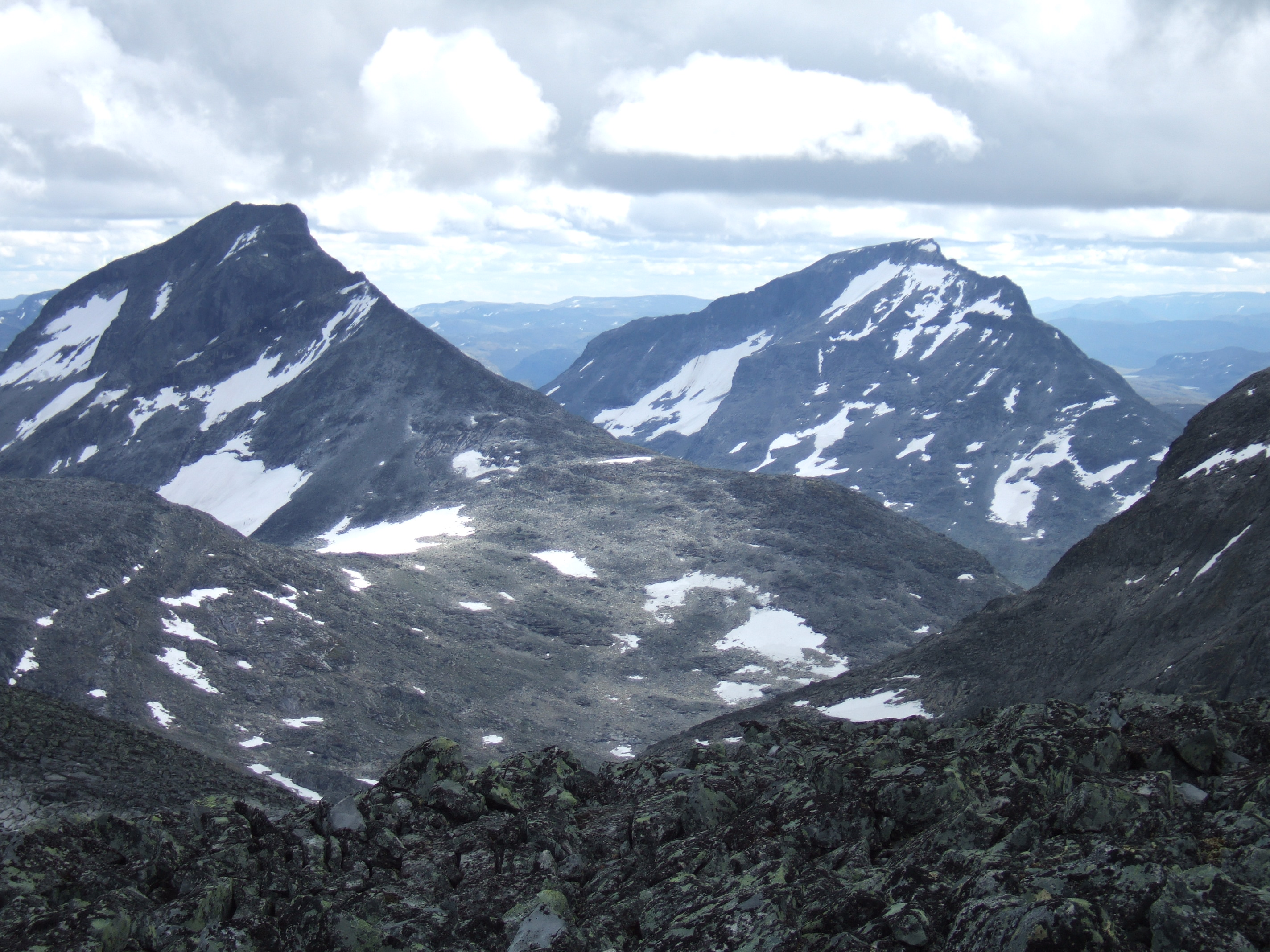
- View of Store Rauddalseggje (left side)

Highest point
- Elevation: 2,168 m (7,113 ft)
- Prominence: 660 m (2,170 ft)
- Isolation: 7 km (4.3 mi)
- Coordinates: 61°27′46″N 8°20′02″E

Geography
- Interactive map of the mountain
- Location: Innlandet, Norway
- Parent range: Jotunheimen
- Topo map: 1517 I Tyin

Climbing
- First ascent: 17 August 1906 (by Schjelderup and Jakhelln)

Store Rauddalseggje is a mountain on the border of Luster Municipality in the Vestland county and Lom Municipality in Innlandet county, Norway. The 2,168-metre (7,113 ft) mountain is located in the Jotunheimen mountains within Jotunheimen National Park and it is the 70th highest mountain in Norway. The mountain sits about 44 kilometres (27 mi) south of the village of Fossbergom and about 32 kilometres (20 mi) northeast of the village of Øvre Årdal. The mountain is surrounded by several other notable mountains including Storådalshøe and Høgtunga to the east; Snøholstinden to the south; Mjølkedalstinden to the west; Austre Høgvagltinden and Høgvagltindane to the northwest; Skarddalstinden to the north; Skarddalseggje and Semeltinden to the northeast.

The first ascent of Store Rauddalseggi was on 17 August 1906 by Ferdinand Schjelderup and Agnes Jakhelln.

== See also ==
- List of mountains of Norway by height
