= Muhammed Lütfi =

Muslim Sufi and poet

Personal life
- Born: 1868 Kındığı, Hasankale, Erzurum, Ottoman Empire
- Died: March 1956 (aged 87–88) Erzurum, Turkey
- Main interest: Fiqh

Religious life
- Religion: Islam
- Denomination: Sunni
- Jurisprudence: Hanafi
- Tariqa: Naqshbandi
- Creed: Maturidi

Muslim leader
- Influenced by: Abu al-Hassan al-Kharaqani, Baha' al-Din Naqshband, Ahmad Sirhindi, Abu Hanifa, Abu Mansur al-Maturidi, Mirza Mazhar Jan-e-Janaan

Mehmet Lütfi Budak, Haja Muhammed Lütfi Effendi, or Alvarlı Efe (meaning "Efe from Alvar") (1868–1956) was a Turkish imam, sufi and poet who was sheikh in the Naqshbandi and Qadiri Sufi orders.

== Life ==
He was born in Kındigi (Altınbaşak) village of Pasinler (Hasankale) district of Erzurum. According to official records his date of birth is 1854, according to his son Hacı Seyfeddin, he was born in 1868. His father was Haja Hüseyin and his mother was named Hatice. He was a Sayyid (descendant of Muhammad on her side. He started to work as an imam in Sivaslı Mosque in Hasankale in 1890. In the same year, he visited Naqshbandi Sheikh Muhammad Kufrawi, who resided in Bitlis with his father, for the first time. Five years later, he received the Naqshbandi caliphate from Muhammad Kufrawi. h received a licence to teach in the Qadiri Sufi order from Sheikh Nur Hamza.

During World War I, he was an imam in the village of Dinarkom when the Russian occupation began in Erzurum in 1916. While he was the imam of the mosque in Yavi village of Tercan, he participated in the war with the militia he formed from the villagers. When the war ended and the Russian occupation was over, he started to work as an imam in the village of Alvar in Hasankale. He resided here until 1939. Imam Ramiz, who succeeded him when he left Alvar, is the father of Fethullah Gülen. Gülen states he was 16 years old when Efe from Alvar died. He went on pilgrimage to Mecca in 1947, 1949 and 1950. He was married five times. Of his sons, only Haji Seyfeddin survived him. He died in Erzurum on March 12, 1956. His grave is in Alvar.

His mother tongue was Turkish, and he also wrote poetry in Arabic, Persian and Kurdish . After his death, his poems were published by his son under the name of Hulasat'ul-Hakayık (The Summary of Truths).
