= Veslbreatinden =

Mountain in Innlandet, Norway

- Interactive map of the mountain

Highest point
- Elevation: 2,092 m (6,864 ft)
- Prominence: 135 m (443 ft)
- Parent peak: Bakarste Skagsnebb
- Isolation: 1.4 km (0.87 mi)
- Coordinates: 61°35′37″N 8°06′43″E

Geography
- Location: Innlandet, Norway
- Parent range: Jotunheimen
- Topo map: 1518 II Galdhøpiggen

Veslbreatinden is a mountain in Lom Municipality in Innlandet county, Norway. The 2,092-metre (6,864 ft) tall mountain is located in the Jotunheimen mountains just to the north of Jotunheimen National Park. The mountain sits about 36 kilometres (22 mi) southwest of the village of Fossbergom and about 34 kilometres (21 mi) northeast of the village of Øvre Årdal. The mountain is surrounded by several other notable mountains including Loftet and Veslfjelltinden to the north; Skagsnebb to the northeast; Galdhøpiggen and Sauhøe to the east; Storbreahøe, Storbreatinden, and Rundhøe to the southeast; and Store Smørstabbtinden and Kniven to the south.

== See also ==
- List of mountains of Norway by height
