= Sunak (disambiguation) =

Rishi Sunak (born 1980) is a British politician who served as Prime Minister of the United Kingdom from 2022 to 2024.

Sunak may also refer to:

- Sunak, Pasinler, a village in Turkey
- Şünäk, Bashkir name for Shunyakovo, Bashkortostan, Russia, a village

== See also ==
- Sunac, a Chinese real estate company
- Sunaka, a sage in Hinduism
