= Store Smørstabbtinden =

Mountain in Innlandet, Norway

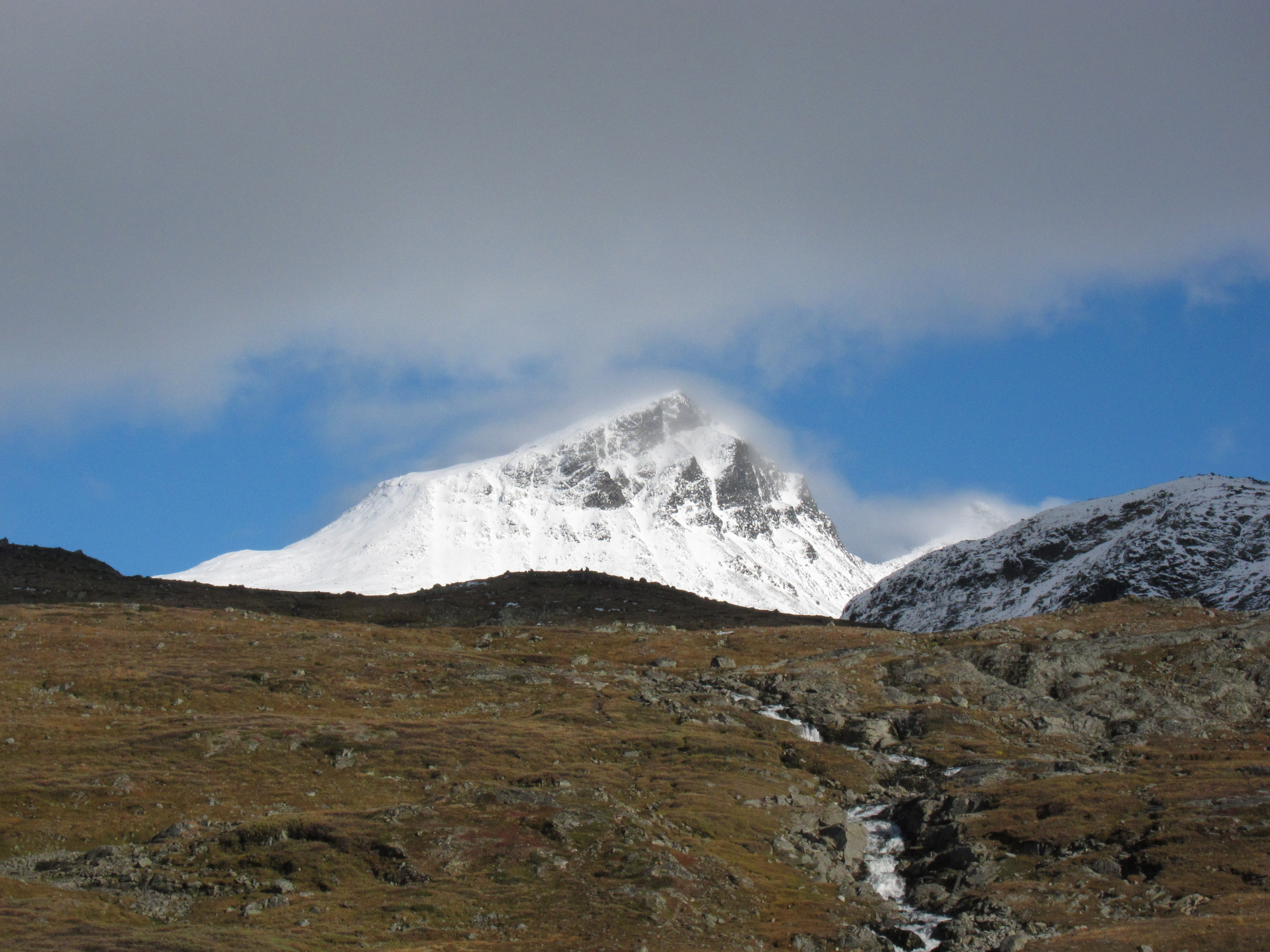
- Store Smørstabbtinden in September 2013. Photo taken from Krossbu in the west.

Highest point
- Elevation: 2,208 m (7,244 ft)
- Prominence: 203 m (666 ft)
- Parent peak: Storebjørn
- Isolation: 2.8 km (1.7 mi) to Storebjørn
- Coordinates: 61°34′18″N 8°07′08″E

Geography
- Interactive map of the mountain
- Location: Innlandet, Norway
- Parent range: Jotunheimen
- Topo map: 1518 II Galdhøpiggen

Store Smørstabbtinden is a mountain in Lom Municipality in Innlandet county, Norway. The 2,208-metre (7,244 ft) tall mountain is located in the Jotunheimen mountains within Jotunheimen National Park. The mountain sits about 40 kilometres (25 mi) southwest of the village of Fossbergom and about 33 kilometres (21 mi) northeast of the village of Øvre Årdal. The mountain lies in the Smørstabbtindene mountains and it is surrounded by several other notable mountains including Rundhøe to the east; Stetinden and Stehøe to the southeast; Kniven, Sokse, Veslebjørn, Storebjørn to the south; Kalven to the southwest; Veslbreatinden to the north; and Storbreatinden and Storbreahøe to the northeast.

== See also ==
- List of mountains of Norway by height
