= Veslfjelltinden =

Mountain in Innlandet, Norway

- Interactive map of the mountain

Highest point
- Elevation: 2,157 m (7,077 ft)
- Prominence: 191 m (627 ft)
- Parent peak: Loftet
- Isolation: 1.6 km (0.99 mi) to Loftet
- Coordinates: 61°36′36″N 8°06′49″E

Geography
- Location: Innlandet, Norway
- Parent range: Jotunheimen
- Topo map: 1518 II Galdhøpiggen

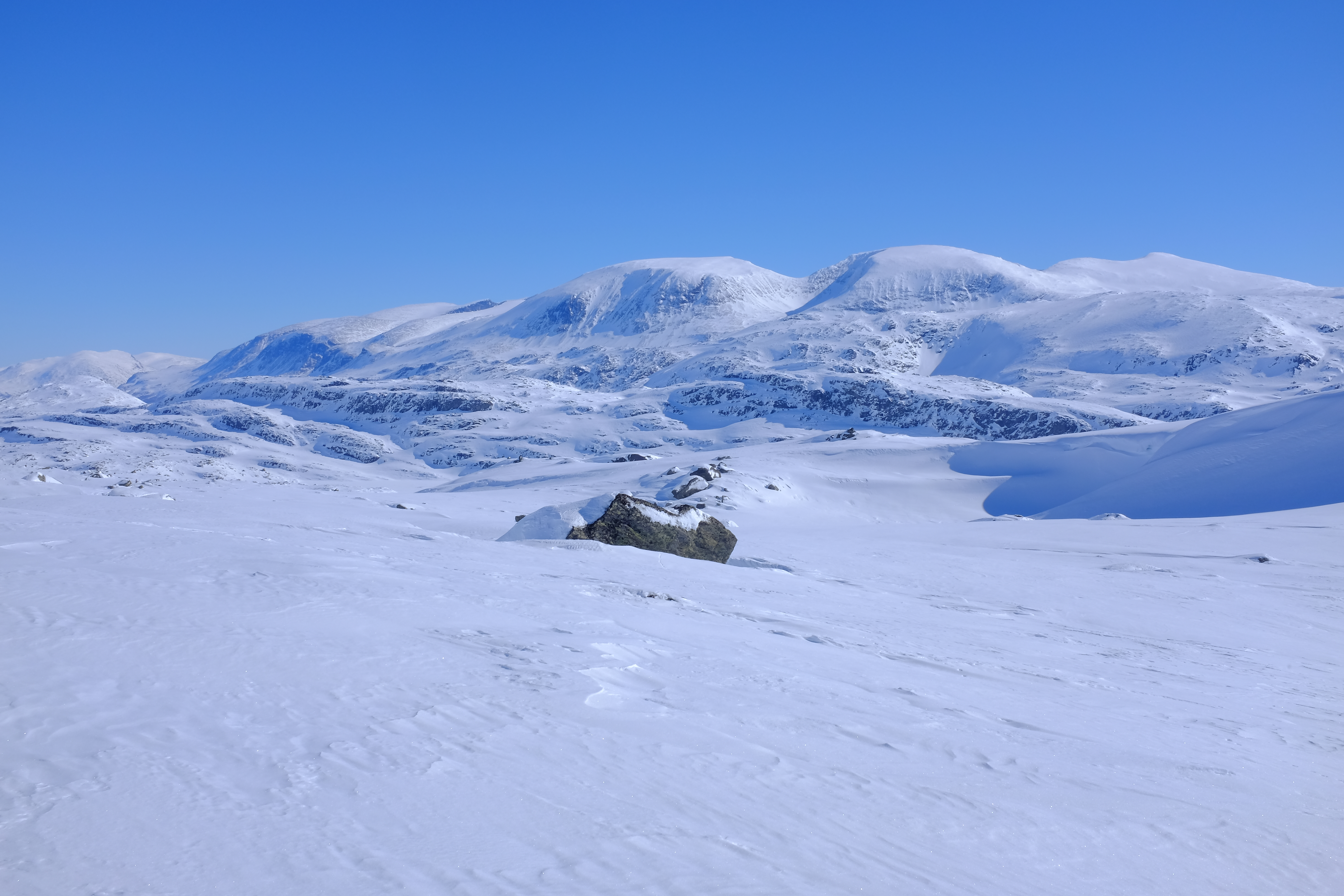
Loftet mountain in the Jotunheimen National Park, between Breidsæterdalen and Leirdalen in Lom Municipality in Oppland

Veslfjelltinden is a mountain in Lom Municipality in Innlandet county, Norway. The 2,157-metre (7,077 ft) tall mountain is located in the Jotunheimen mountains, just north of the Jotunheimen National Park. The mountain sits about 35 kilometres (22 mi) southwest of the village of Fossbergom and about 37 kilometres (23 mi) northeast of the village of Øvre Årdal. The mountain is surrounded by several other notable mountains including Loftet to the northeast; Galdhøpiggen, Skagsnebb, and Sauhøe to the east; Storbreahøe to the southeast; and Veslbreatinden and Storbreatinden to the south.

== See also ==
- List of mountains of Norway by height
