= Stetinden =

Stetinden may refer to:

== Places ==
- Stetinden (Lom), a mountain on the border of Lom Municipality and Luster Municipality, Norway
- Stetinden (Narvik), a mountain in Narvik Municipality in Nordland county, Norway
- Stetinden (Rødøy), a mountain in Rødøy Municipality in Nordland county, Norway
- Stetinden (Troms), a mountain in Lyngen Municipality in Troms county, Norway
