= Yukarıçakmak =

Yukarıçakmak can refer to:

- Yukarıçakmak, Elâzığ
- Yukarıçakmak, Pasinler
