= Yukarıdanişment =

Yukarıdanişment can refer to:

- Yukarıdanişment, Pasinler
- Yukarıdanişment, Savaştepe
