= Skagsnebb =

Mountain in Innlandet, Norway

- Interactive map of the mountain

Highest point
- Elevation: 2,003 m (6,572 ft)
- Prominence: 67 m (220 ft)
- Parent peak: Loftet
- Isolation: 0.750 km (0.466 mi)
- Coordinates: 61°36′23″N 8°08′51″E

Geography
- Location: Innlandet, Norway
- Parent range: Jotunheimen
- Topo map: 1518 II Galdhøpiggen

Skagsnebb is a mountain in Lom Municipality in Innlandet county, Norway. The 2,003-metre (6,572 ft) tall mountain is located in the Jotunheimen mountains just north of Jotunheimen National Park. The mountain sits about 35 kilometres (22 mi) southwest of the village of Fossbergom and about 38 kilometres (24 mi) northeast of the village of Øvre Årdal. The mountain is surrounded by several other notable mountains including Galdhøpiggen and Sauhøe to the east, Storbreahøe to the south, Veslbreatinden and Storbreatinden to the southwest, Veslfjelltinden to the west, and Loftet to the northwest.

== See also ==
- List of mountains of Norway by height
