= Visbreatinden =

Mountain in Innlandet, Norway

- Visbretinden (unofficial)
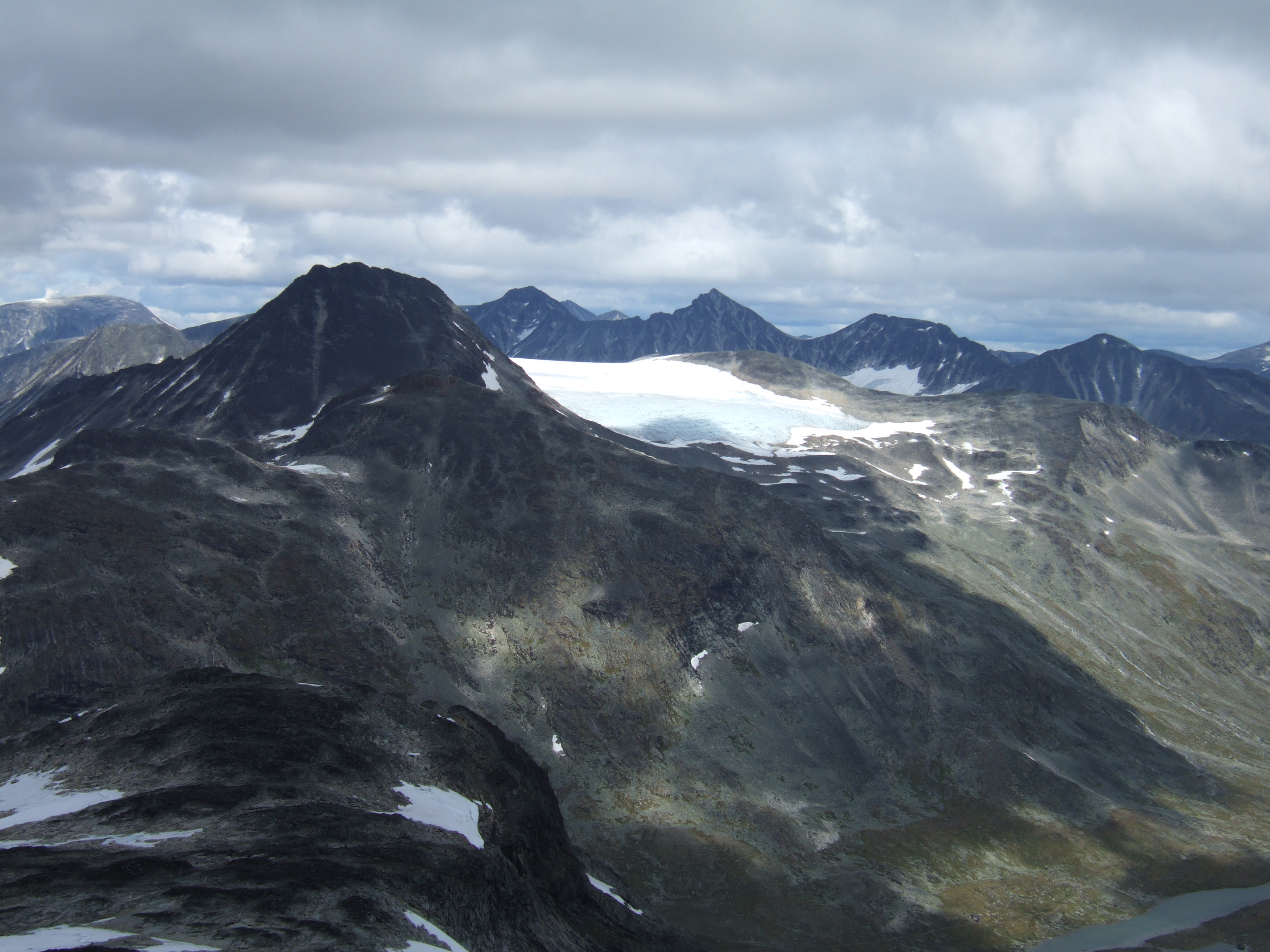
- Visbretinden seen from Center Høgvaggltindane, Jotunheimen

Highest point
- Elevation: 2,234 m (7,329 ft)
- Prominence: 573 m (1,880 ft)
- Parent peak: Surtingssue
- Isolation: 4.2 km (2.6 mi) to Semeltinden
- Coordinates: 61°31′49″N 8°20′08″E

Geography
- Interactive map of the mountain
- Location: Innlandet, Norway
- Parent range: Jotunheimen
- Topo map: 1518 II Galdhøpiggen

Visbreatinden is a mountain in Lom Municipality in Innlandet county, Norway. It is the 41st tallest mountain in Norway. The 2,234-metre (7,329 ft) tall mountain is located in the Jotunheimen mountains within Jotunheimen National Park. The mountain sits about 35 kilometres (22 mi) south of the village of Fossbergom and about 37 kilometres (23 mi) northeast of the village of Øvre Årdal. The mountain is surrounded by several other notable mountains including Urdadalstindan and Semelholstinden to the northeast; Semeltinden to the southeast; Skarddalstinden and Skarddalseggje to the south; Høgvagltindane and Langvasshøe to the southwest; Kyrkja and Kyrkjeoksle to the west; and Tverrbytthornet to the northwest.

== See also ==
- List of mountains of Norway by height
