= Sakshi Malik (disambiguation) =

Sakshi Malik may refer to:

- Sakshi Malik (born 1992), Indian freestyle wrestler
- Sakshi Malik (actress) (born 1996), Indian actress and model

== See also ==
- Sakshi (disambiguation)
