= Loftet =

Mountain in Innlandet, Norway

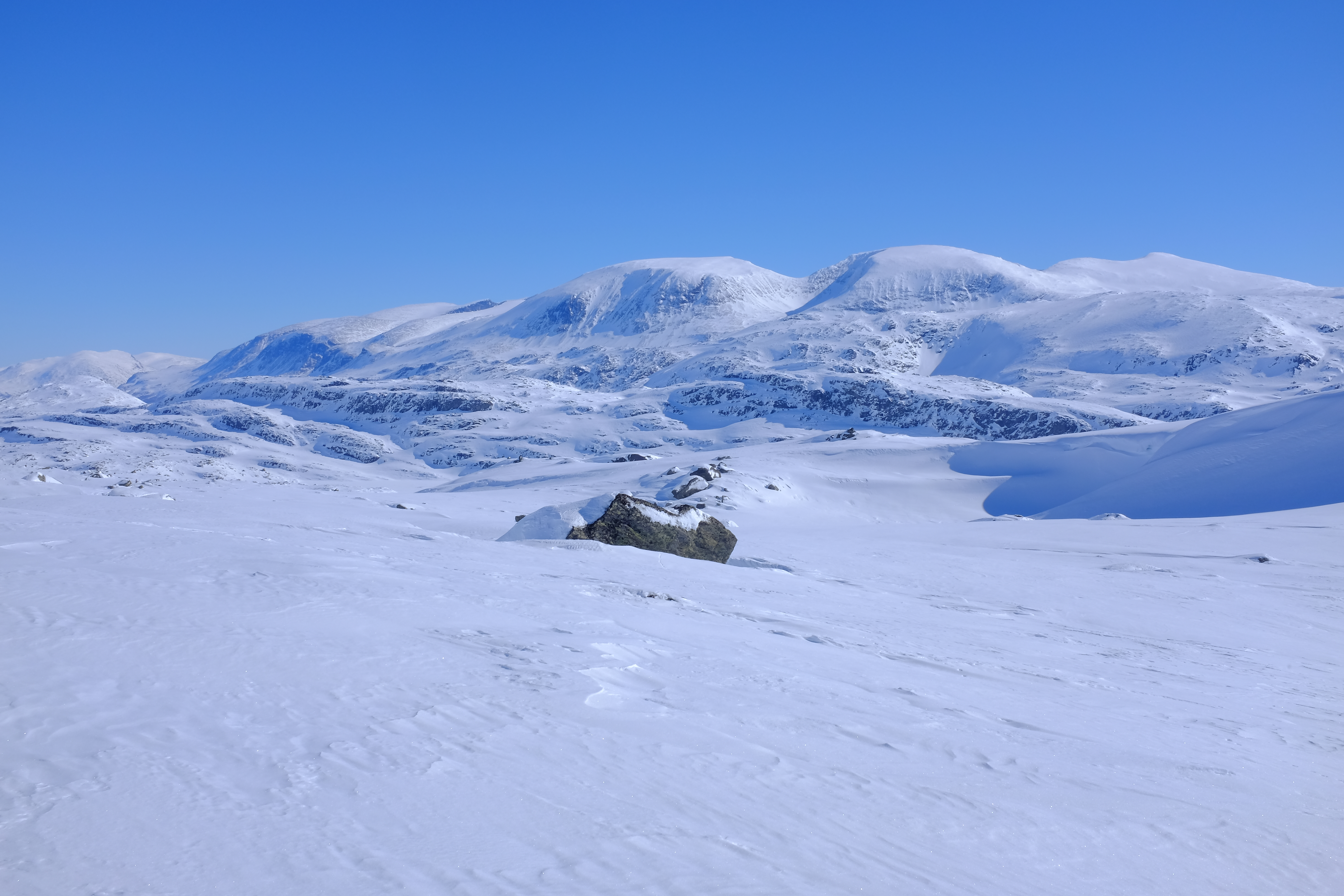
- Loftet among other mountains in Jotunheimen

Highest point
- Elevation: 2,170 m (7,120 ft)
- Prominence: 342 m (1,122 ft)
- Parent peak: Storebjørn
- Isolation: 5.7 km (3.5 mi)
- Coordinates: 61°37′22″N 8°07′34″E

Geography
- Interactive map of the mountain
- Location: Innlandet, Norway
- Parent range: Jotunheimen
- Topo map: 1518 II Galdhøpiggen

Loftet is a mountain in Lom Municipality in Innlandet county, Norway. The 2,170-metre (7,120 ft) tall mountain is located in the Jotunheimen mountains just outside the Jotunheimen National Park. The mountain sits about 33 kilometres (21 mi) southwest of the village of Fossbergom and about 40 kilometres (25 mi) northeast of the village of Øvre Årdal. The mountain is surrounded by several other notable mountains including Galdhøpiggen to the east; Skagsnebb and Sauhøe to the southeast; Storbreahøe to the south; and Veslfjelltinden, Veslbreatinden, and Storbreatinden to the south.

== See also ==
- List of mountains of Norway by height
