= Kalven =

Mountain in Innlandet, Norway

- Interactive map of the mountain

Highest point
- Elevation: 2,034 m (6,673 ft)
- Prominence: 55 m (180 ft)
- Parent peak: Storebjørn
- Isolation: 0.641 km (0.398 mi)
- Coordinates: 61°33′13″N 8°06′15″E

Geography
- Location: Innlandet, Norway
- Parent range: Jotunheimen
- Topo map: 1518 II Galdhøpiggen

Kalven is a mountain in Lom Municipality in Innlandet county, Norway. The 2,034-metre (6,673 ft) tall mountain is located in the Jotunheimen mountains within Jotunheimen National Park. The mountain sits about 40 kilometres (25 mi) southwest of the village of Fossbergom and about 33 kilometres (21 mi) northeast of the village of Øvre Årdal. The mountain lies in the Smørstabbtindene mountains and it is surrounded by several other notable mountains including Gravdalstinden to the south; Storebjørn and Stetinden to the southeast; Veslebjørn to the east; and Sokse, Kviven, and Store Smørstabbtinden to the northeast. The mountain peak is surrounded by a glacier.

== See also ==
- List of mountains of Norway by height
