= Skarddalstinden =

Mountain in Innlandet, Norway

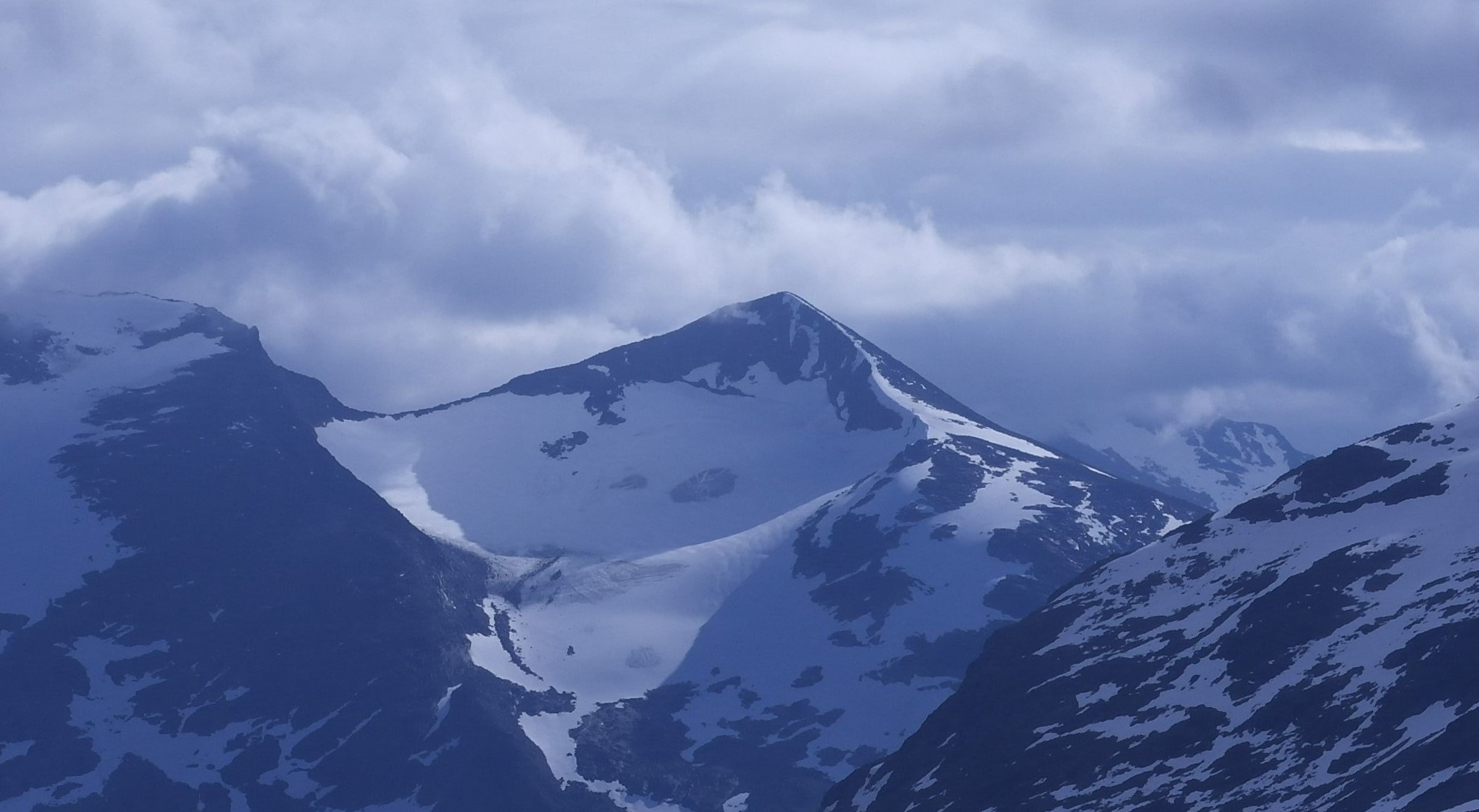

Highest point
- Elevation: 2,100 m (6,900 ft)
- Prominence: 157 m (515 ft)
- Parent peak: Skarddalseggje
- Isolation: 0.818 km (0.508 mi) to Skarddalseggje
- Coordinates: 61°29′21″N 8°19′14″E

Geography
- Interactive map of the mountain
- Location: Innlandet, Norway
- Parent range: Jotunheimen
- Topo map: 1517 I Tyin

Skarddalstinden is a mountain in Lom Municipality in Innlandet county, Norway. The 2,100-metre (6,900 ft) tall mountain is located in the Jotunheimen mountains within Jotunheimen National Park. The mountain sits about 40 kilometres (25 mi) south of the village of Fossbergom and about 32 kilometres (20 mi) northeast of the village of Øvre Årdal. The mountain is surrounded by several other notable mountains including Skarddalseggje and Storådalshøe to the east; Store Rauddalseggje to the south; Austre Høgvagltindane and Høgvagltindane to the northwest; Kyrkja, Kyrkjeoksle, Langvasshøe, and Visbreatinden to the north; and Urdadalstindan and Semeltinden to the northeast.

== See also ==
- List of mountains of Norway by height
