= Semelholstinden =

Mountain in Innlandet, Norway

- Interactive map of the mountain

Highest point
- Elevation: 2,147 m (7,044 ft)
- Prominence: 145 m (476 ft)
- Parent peak: Visbretinden
- Isolation: 0.855 km (0.531 mi) to Visbreatinden
- Coordinates: 61°32′06″N 8°21′23″E

Geography
- Location: Innlandet, Norway
- Parent range: Jotunheimen
- Topo map: 1518 II Galdhøpiggen

Semelholstinden is a mountain in Lom Municipality in Innlandet county, Norway. The 2,147-metre (7,044 ft) tall mountain is located in the Jotunheimen mountains within Jotunheimen National Park. The mountain sits about 35 kilometres (22 mi) southeast of the village of Fossbergom and about 38 kilometres (24 mi) northeast of the village of Øvre Årdal. The mountain is surrounded by several other notable mountains including Urdadalstindan, Søre Hellstugutinden, and Nestsøre Hellstugutinden to the east; Semeltinden to the southeast; Høgvagltindane, Visbreatinden, and Langvasshøe to the southwest; Kyrkja and Kyrkjeoksle to the west; and Tverrbytthornet to the northwest.

== See also ==
- List of mountains of Norway by height
