= Demirdöven =

Demirdöven (Turkish: "iron beater", i.e., blacksmith) may refer to the following places in Turkey:

- Demirdöven, Posof, a village in the district of Posof, Ardahan Province
- Demirdöven, Pasinler
- Demirdöven, Yusufeli, a village in the district of Yusufeli, Artvin Province
- Demirdöven Dam

== See also ==
- Demirci (disambiguation)
