= Başören, Pasinler =

Village in Turkey

Başören
- Neighbourhood
- Location in Turkey
- Coordinates: 40.1764°N 41.6478°E
- Country: Turkey
- Province: Erzurum
- District: Pasinler
- Population (2022): 113
- Time zone: UTC+3 (TRT)

Başören is a neighbourhood in the municipality and district of Pasinler, Erzurum Province in Turkey. Its population is 113 (2022).
