= Ağcalar, Pasinler =

Village in Turkey

Ağcalar
- Neighbourhood
- Location in Turkey
- Coordinates: 39.9257°N 41.5254°E
- Country: Turkey
- Province: Erzurum
- District: Pasinler
- Population (2022): 204
- Time zone: UTC+3 (TRT)

Ağcalar is a neighbourhood in the municipality and district of Pasinler, Erzurum Province in Turkey. Its population is 204 (2022).
