= Üğümü, Pasinler =

Village in Turkey

Üğümü
- Neighbourhood
- Location in Turkey
- Coordinates: 40°01′N 41°44′E
- Country: Turkey
- Province: Erzurum
- District: Pasinler
- Population (2022): 261
- Time zone: UTC+3 (TRT)

Üğümü is a neighbourhood in the municipality and district of Pasinler, Erzurum Province in Turkey. Its population is 261 (2022).
