= Kevenlik, Pasinler =

Village in Turkey

Kevenlik
- Neighbourhood
- Location in Turkey
- Coordinates: 40°01′15″N 41°31′18″E
- Country: Turkey
- Province: Erzurum
- District: Pasinler
- Population (2022): 214
- Time zone: UTC+3 (TRT)

Kevenlik is a neighbourhood in the municipality and district of Pasinler, Erzurum Province in Turkey. Its population is 214 (2022).
