= Çalıyazı, Pasinler =

Village in Turkey

Çalıyazı
- Neighbourhood
- Location in Turkey
- Coordinates: 40°07′30″N 41°40′11″E
- Country: Turkey
- Province: Erzurum
- District: Pasinler
- Population (2022): 125
- Time zone: UTC+3 (TRT)

Çalıyazı is a neighbourhood in the municipality and district of Pasinler, Erzurum Province in Turkey. Its population is 125 (2022).
