= Küçüktüy, Pasinler =

Village in Turkey

Küçüktüy
- Neighbourhood
- Location in Turkey
- Coordinates: 39°59′58″N 41°26′08″E
- Country: Turkey
- Province: Erzurum
- District: Pasinler
- Population (2022): 155
- Time zone: UTC+3 (TRT)

Küçüktüy is a neighbourhood in the municipality and district of Pasinler, Erzurum Province in Turkey. Its population is 155.
