= Porsuk, Pasinler =

Village in Turkey

Porsuk
- Neighbourhood
- Location in Turkey
- Coordinates: 40°01′N 41°33′E
- Country: Turkey
- Province: Erzurum
- District: Pasinler
- Population (2022): 254
- Time zone: UTC+3 (TRT)

Porsuk is a neighbourhood in the district of Pasinler, Erzurum Province, Turkey. Its population is 254 (2022).
