= Sakshi =

Sakshi or Saakshi may refer to:

- Sakshi (witness), a concept in Hindu philosophy
- Sakshi (film), a 1967 Telugu film
- Saaksshi, 2004 Indian television series
- Sakshi (novel), a 1986 Kannada novel by S. L. Bhyrappa
- Sakshi (newspaper), a Telugu daily based in Hyderabad, India
- Sakshi TV, a Telugu news channel
- Sakshi (media group), holding company of Sakshi newspaper and Sakshi TV
- Sakshigopal Temple, a temple dedicated to Lord Gopal located in Sakshigopal, Orissa

== People ==
- Sakshi Chaudhary (born 1993), Indian model and actress
- Sakshi Maharaj (born 1956), Indian politician from Uttar Pradesh
- Sakshi Malik (born 1992), Indian wrestler
- Sakshi Ranga Rao (1942–2005), Indian actor in Telugu films
- Sakshi Shivanand (born 1977), Indian actress in Telugu, Tamil, Kannada, Malayalam, and Hindi films
- Saakshi Siva (born 1972), Indian actor in Tamil and Telugu television serials
- Sakshi Tanwar (born 1973), Indian actress

== See also ==
- Saksi (disambiguation)
- Agni Sakshi (disambiguation)
