= Kavuşturan, Pasinler =

Village in Turkey

Kavuşturan
- Neighbourhood
- Location in Turkey
- Coordinates: 40°02′N 41°41′E
- Country: Turkey
- Province: Erzurum
- District: Pasinler
- Population (2022): 459
- Time zone: UTC+3 (TRT)

Kavuşturan is a neighbourhood in the municipality and district of Pasinler, Erzurum Province in Turkey. Its population is 459 (2022).
