= Pusudere, Pasinler =

Village in Turkey

Pusudere
- Neighbourhood
- Location in Turkey
- Coordinates: 39°57′06″N 41°27′40″E
- Country: Turkey
- Province: Erzurum
- District: Pasinler
- Population (2022): 68
- Time zone: UTC+3 (TRT)

Pusudere is a neighbourhood in the municipality and district of Pasinler, Erzurum Province in Turkey. Its population is 68 (2022).
