= Acı, Pasinler =

Village in Turkey

Acı
- Neighbourhood
- Location in Turkey
- Coordinates: 40.0525°N 41.5800°E
- Country: Turkey
- Province: Erzurum
- District: Pasinler
- Population (2022): 261
- Time zone: UTC+3 (TRT)

Acı is a neighbourhood in the municipality and district of Pasinler, Erzurum Province in Turkey. Its population is 261 (2022).
