= Pasinler Castle =

Castle in Pasinler

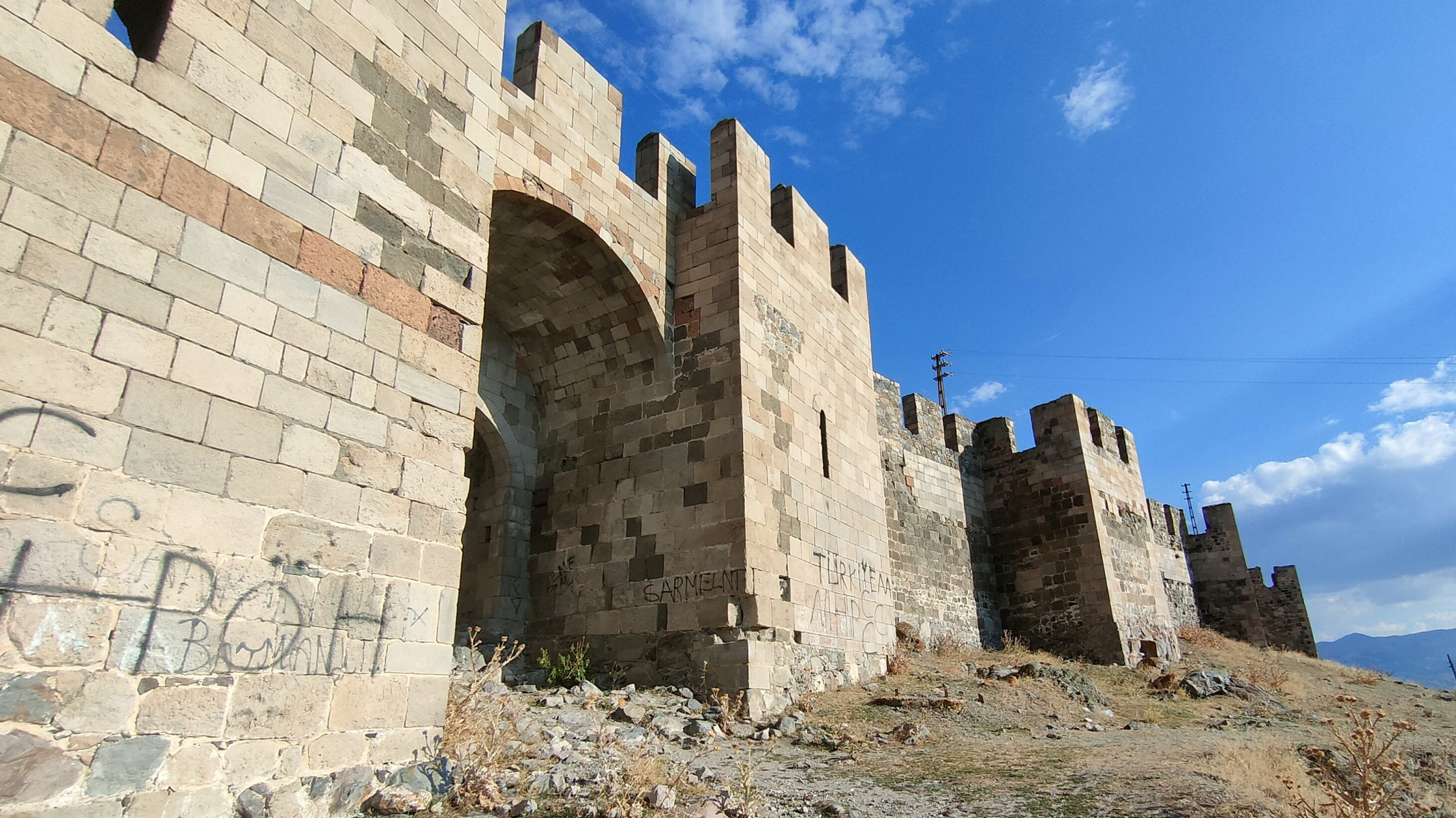
- Gatehouse
- Location: Pasinler, Turkey
- Coordinates: 39.97896°N 41.68138°E
- Elevation: 1740 meters
- Built: Iron Age
- Rebuilt: 16th century

Pasinler Castle, sometimes referred to as Hasan Castle, is a ruined fortification in Pasinler, Turkey. The historical name for the town of Pasinler, Hasankale (lit. 'Castle of Hasan'), is derived from the castle. The site has been used as a fortification since the Iron Age.

== History ==
The site features inscriptions and stonework from the reign of Minua. During the Urartian period, the site was one of the most notable fortresses in northeastern Urartu, and it would have helped Urartian kings secure valuable resources in the region. Later occupants of the fortress included the Byzantines, Armenians, and White Sheep Turkomans. Uzun Hasan, a 15th century Turkoman chief and possible etymological source of Hasankale, contributed to the fortification of the town and castle. In the 16th century, the Ottomans rebuilt the castle, and it remained in use until after the Russo-Turkish War (1828–1829). The site is a ruin in the modern period.

== Description ==
The castle sits on a large rocky hill at an elevation of 1740 meters and overlooks the town of Pasinler and the surrounding plain. There are three sets of walls, the outer two terminating at the steep rock face without forming complete circuits. A gatehouse lies on the western portion. The site also includes a water tunnel that travels through the rock to the Pasinler Stream below.

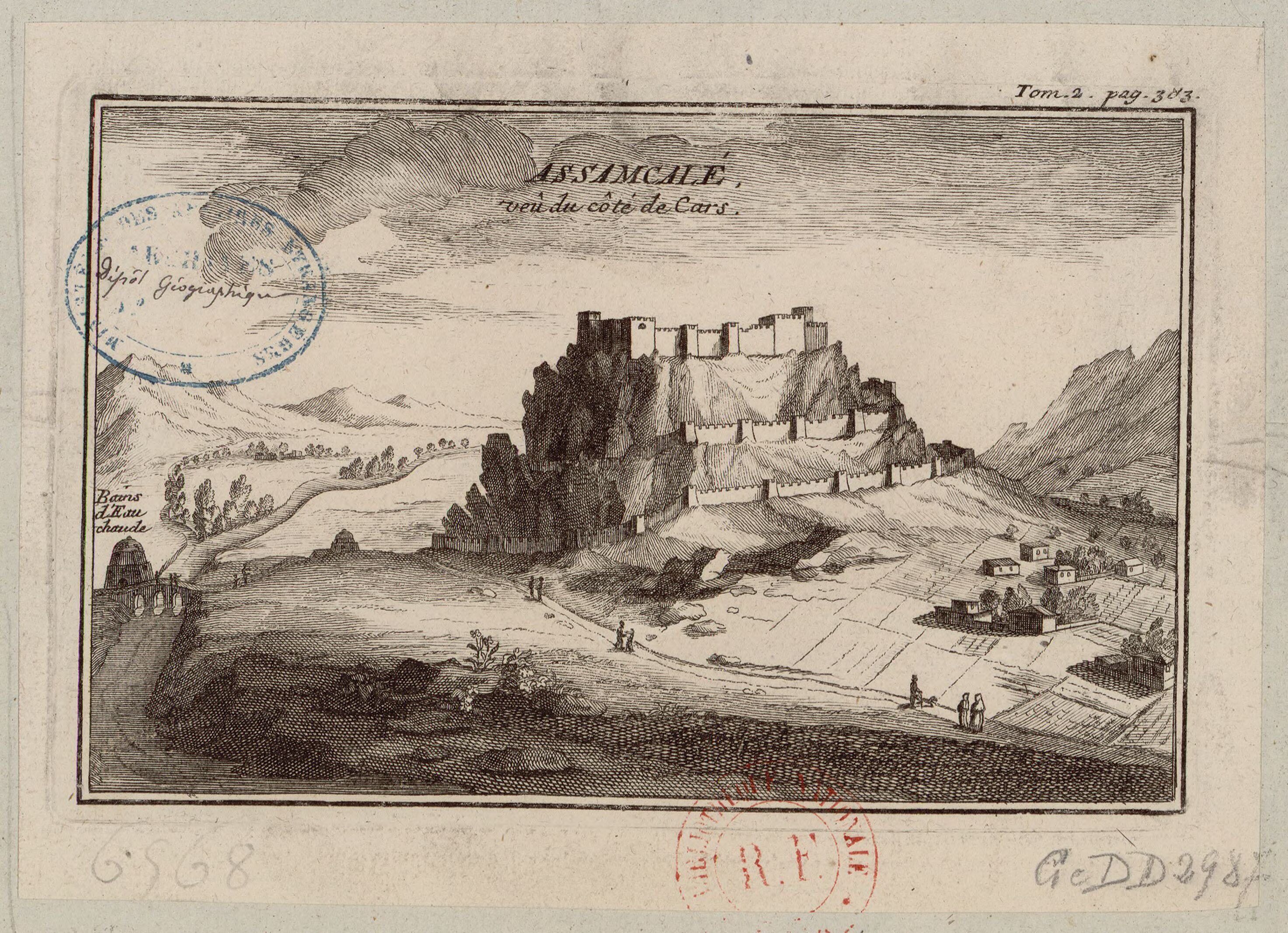
Early 18th century depiction from Tournefort

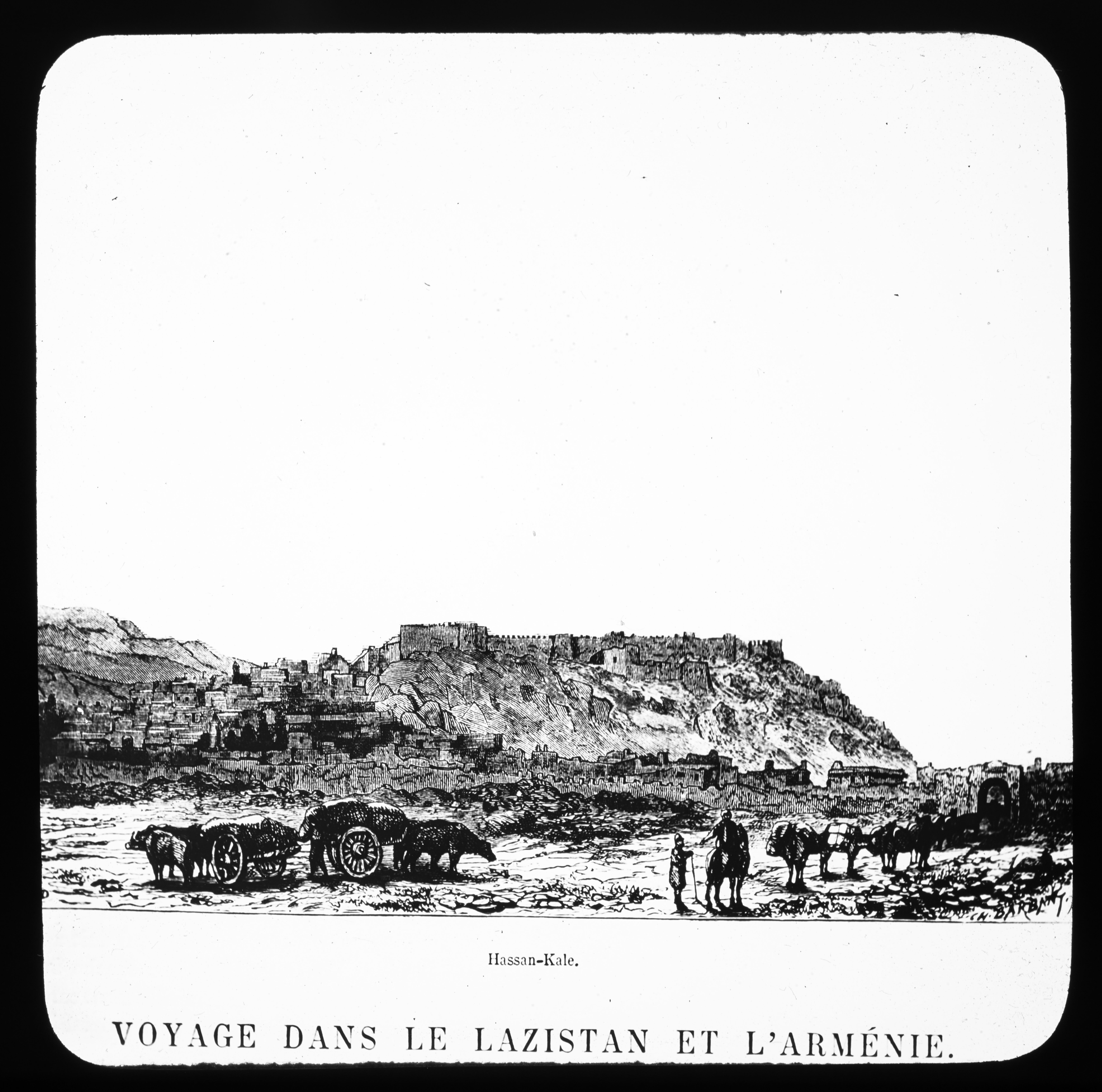
19th century depiction from Théophile Deyrolle

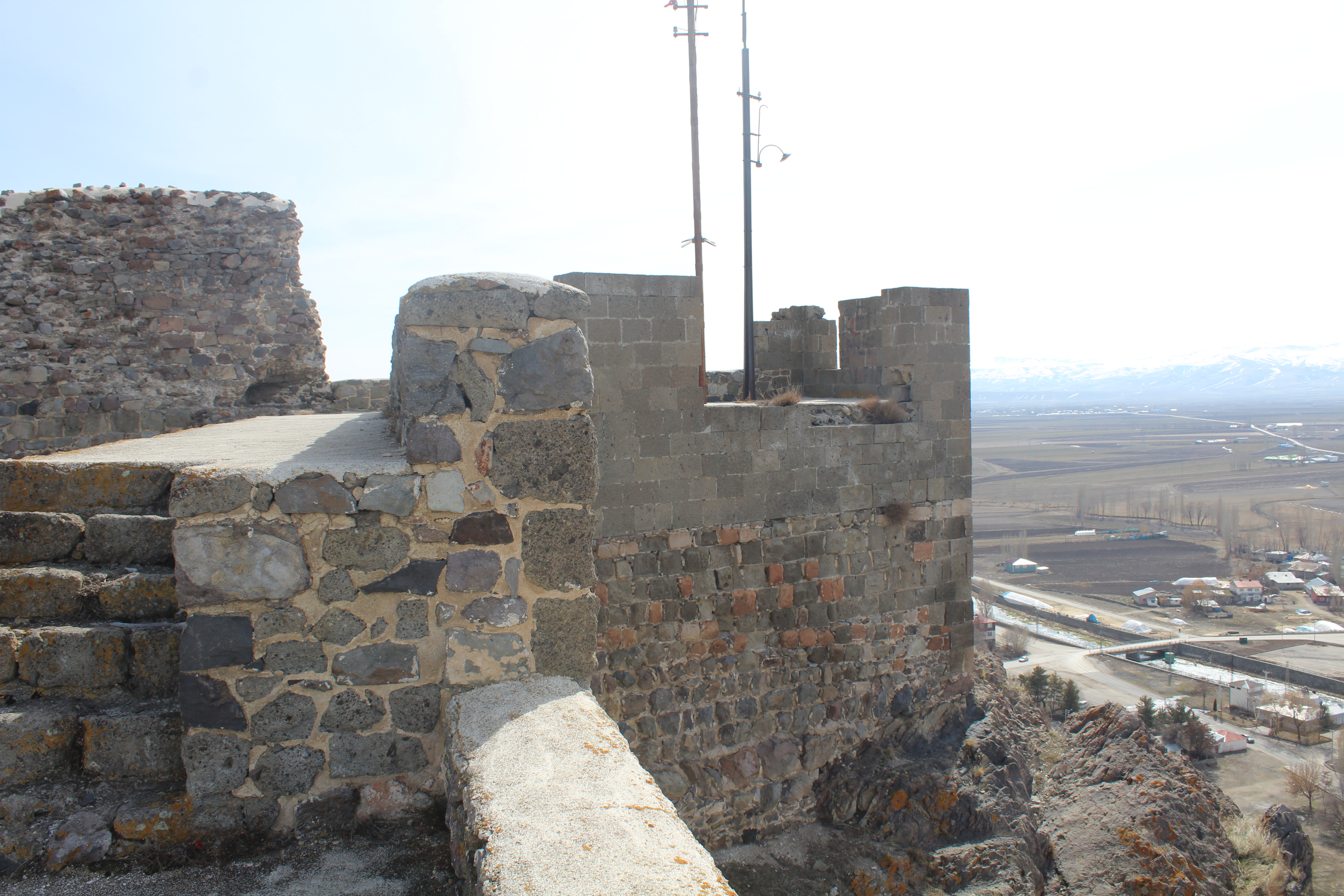
Tower with plain and river in background

== See also ==
- List of castles in Turkey
