= Kızılören, Pasinler =

Village in Turkey

Kızılören
- Neighbourhood
- Country: Turkey
- Province: Erzurum
- District: Pasinler
- Population (2022): 66
- Time zone: UTC+3 (TRT)

Kızılören is a neighbourhood in the municipality and district of Pasinler, Erzurum Province in Turkey. Its population is 66 (2022).
