= Alvar, Pasinler =

Village in Turkey

Alvar
- Neighbourhood
- Location in Turkey
- Coordinates: 39°56′29″N 41°36′46″E
- Country: Turkey
- Province: Erzurum
- District: Pasinler
- Population (2022): 795
- Time zone: UTC+3 (TRT)

Alvar is a neighbourhood in the municipality and district of Pasinler, Erzurum Province in Turkey. Its population is 795 (2022).
