= Epsemce, Pasinler =

Village in Turkey

Epsemce
- Neighbourhood
- Location in Turkey
- Coordinates: 39°58′37″N 41°46′08″E
- Country: Turkey
- Province: Erzurum
- District: Pasinler
- Population (2022): 468
- Time zone: UTC+3 (TRT)

Epsemce is a neighbourhood in the municipality and district of Pasinler, Erzurum Province in Turkey. Its population is 468 (2022).
