= Çamlıca, Pasinler =

Village in Turkey

Çamlıca
- Neighbourhood
- Location in Turkey
- Coordinates: 39°51′32″N 41°30′58″E
- Country: Turkey
- Province: Erzurum
- District: Pasinler
- Population (2022): 162
- Time zone: UTC+3 (TRT)

Çamlıca is a neighbourhood in the municipality and district of Pasinler, Erzurum Province in Turkey. Its population is 162 (2022).
