= Rundhøe =

Mountain in Innlandet, Norway

- Interactive map of the mountain

Highest point
- Elevation: 1,822 m (5,978 ft)
- Prominence: 69 m (226 ft)
- Parent peak: Storebjørn
- Isolation: 0.896 km (0.557 mi)
- Coordinates: 61°34′28″N 8°10′43″E

Geography
- Location: Innlandet, Norway
- Parent range: Jotunheimen
- Topo map: 1518 II Galdhøpiggen

Rundhøe is a mountain in Lom Municipality in Innlandet county, Norway. The 1,822-metre (5,978 ft) tall mountain is located in the Jotunheimen mountains on the border of Jotunheimen National Park. The mountain sits about 36 kilometres (22 mi) southwest of the village of Fossbergom and about 34 kilometres (21 mi) northeast of the village of Øvre Årdal. The mountain is surrounded by several other notable mountains including Kyrkja, Stehøe, and Stetinden to the southeast; Surtningstinden to the south; Storebjørn, Veslebjørn, and Sokse to the southwest; Store Smørstabbtinden and Kniven to the west; and Storbreahøe and Storbreatinden to the northwest.

== See also ==
- List of mountains of Norway by height
