= Langvasshøe =

Mountain in Innlandet, Norway

- Interactive map of the mountain

Highest point
- Elevation: 2,030 m (6,660 ft)
- Prominence: 74 m (243 ft)
- Parent peak: Visbreatinden
- Isolation: 0.608 km (0.378 mi)
- Coordinates: 61°31′28″N 8°19′20″E

Geography
- Location: Innlandet, Norway
- Parent range: Jotunheimen
- Topo map: 1518 II Galdhøpiggen

Langvasshøe is a mountain in Lom Municipality in Innlandet county, Norway. The 2,030-metre (6,660 ft) tall mountain is located in the Jotunheimen mountains within Jotunheimen National Park. The mountain sits about 35 kilometres (22 mi) south of the village of Fossbergom and about 37 kilometres (23 mi) northeast of the village of Øvre Årdal. The mountain is surrounded by several other notable mountains including Urdadalstindan, Visbreatinden, and Semelholstinden to the northeast; Semeltinden to the southeast; Skarddalstinden and Skarddalseggje to the south; Høgvagltindane to the southwest; Kyrkja and Kyrkjeoksle to the northwest; and Tverrbytthornet to the north.

== See also ==
- List of mountains of Norway by height
