= Büyükdere, Pasinler =

Village in Turkey

Büyükdere
- Neighbourhood
- Location in Turkey
- Coordinates: 40.0458°N 41.6166°E
- Country: Turkey
- Province: Erzurum
- District: Pasinler
- Population (2022): 397
- Time zone: UTC+3 (TRT)

Büyükdere is a neighbourhood in the municipality and district of Pasinler, Erzurum Province in Turkey. Its population is 397 (2022).
