= Karavelet, Pasinler =

Village in Turkey

Karavelet
- Neighbourhood
- Location in Turkey
- Coordinates: 39°55′N 41°30′E
- Country: Turkey
- Province: Erzurum
- District: Pasinler
- Population (2022): 167
- Time zone: UTC+3 (TRT)

Karavelet is a neighbourhood in the municipality and district of Pasinler, Erzurum Province in Turkey. Its population is 167 (2022).
