= Serçeboğazı, Pasinler =

Village in Turkey

Serçeboğazı
- Neighbourhood
- Location in Turkey
- Coordinates: 40°00′45″N 41°38′39″E
- Country: Turkey
- Province: Erzurum
- District: Pasinler
- Population (2022): 309
- Time zone: UTC+3 (TRT)

Serçeboğazı is a neighbourhood in the municipality and district of Pasinler, Erzurum Province in Turkey. Its population is 309 (2022).
