= Büyüktüy, Pasinler =

Village in Turkey

Büyüktüy
- Neighbourhood
- Location in Turkey
- Coordinates: 39°59′06″N 41°26′17″E
- Country: Turkey
- Province: Erzurum
- District: Pasinler
- Population (2022): 259
- Time zone: UTC+3 (TRT)

Büyüktüy is a neighbourhood in the municipality and district of Pasinler, Erzurum Province in Turkey. Its population is 259 (2022).
