= Çöğender, Pasinler =

Village in Turkey

Çöğender
- Neighbourhood
- Location in Turkey
- Coordinates: 40.000°N 41.541°E
- Country: Turkey
- Province: Erzurum
- District: Pasinler
- Population (2022): 560
- Time zone: UTC+3 (TRT)

Çöğender is a neighbourhood in the municipality and district of Pasinler, Erzurum Province in Turkey. Its population is 560 (2022).
