= Kotandüzü, Pasinler =

Village in Turkey

Kotandüzü
- Neighbourhood
- Location in Turkey
- Coordinates: 40°05′05″N 41°38′02″E
- Country: Turkey
- Province: Erzurum
- District: Pasinler
- Population (2022): 64
- Time zone: UTC+3 (TRT)

Kotandüzü is a neighbourhood in the municipality and district of Pasinler, Erzurum Province in Turkey. Its population is 64 (2022).
