= Bulkasım, Pasinler =

Village in Turkey

Bulkasım
- Neighbourhood
- Location in Turkey
- Coordinates: 39°54′09″N 41°37′08″E
- Country: Turkey
- Province: Erzurum
- District: Pasinler
- Population (2022): 207
- Time zone: UTC+3 (TRT)

Bulkasım is a neighbourhood in the municipality and district of Pasinler, Erzurum Province in Turkey. Its population is 207 (2022).
