= Gerdekkaya, Pasinler =

Village in Turkey

Gerdekkaya
- Neighbourhood
- Location in Turkey
- Coordinates: 39°54′18″N 41°29′07″E
- Country: Turkey
- Province: Erzurum
- District: Pasinler
- Population (2022): 88
- Time zone: UTC+3 (TRT)

Gerdekkaya is a neighbourhood in the municipality and district of Pasinler, Erzurum Province in Turkey. Its population is 88 (2022).
