= Gölciğez, Pasinler =

Village in Turkey

Gölciğez
- Neighbourhood
- Location in Turkey
- Coordinates: 40°00′N 41°30′E
- Country: Turkey
- Province: Erzurum
- District: Pasinler
- Population (2022): 82
- Time zone: UTC+3 (TRT)

Gölciğez is a neighbourhood in the municipality and district of Pasinler, Erzurum Province in Turkey. Its population is 82 (2022).
