= Ardıçlı, Pasinler =

Village in Turkey

Ardıçlı
- Neighbourhood
- Location in Turkey
- Coordinates: 40.0188°N 41.7592°E
- Country: Turkey
- Province: Erzurum
- District: Pasinler
- Population (2022): 720
- Time zone: UTC+3 (TRT)

Ardıçlı is a neighbourhood in the municipality and district of Pasinler, Erzurum Province in Turkey. Its population is 720 (2022).
