= Yiğittaşı, Pasinler =

Village in Turkey

Yiğittaşı
- Neighbourhood
- Location in Turkey
- Coordinates: 39°59′36″N 41°31′25″E
- Country: Turkey
- Province: Erzurum
- District: Pasinler
- Population (2022): 294
- Time zone: UTC+3 (TRT)

Yiğittaşı is a mahalle (neighbourhood) in the municipality and district of Pasinler, Erzurum Province in Turkey. Its population is 294 (2022).

== Sos Höyük ==
Sos Höyük is an archaeological mound that is located within the village. The name of the mound comes from 'Sosköyü', the old name of the village. The settlement started from the Late Chalcolithic Age. The main excavations were carried out under the direction of Antonio Sagona between 1994 and 2000.

The village is situated at an altitude of 1800m in the narrow Pasinler Valley, which represents a convenient route through the mountains of Eastern Anatolia to Western Turkey from Iran and the Caucasus. It is located in the highlands where the upper Araxes river and the upper Euphrates river come close together.

In the late 4th millennium BC (Late Chalcolithic), Sos Höyük was initially settled by the representatives of Kura–Araxes culture, and they continued in this area through most of the Bronze Age. The lifestyle of the early villagers included elements of transhumance.

Some evidence for early metal production has also been uncovered at Sos Höyük, such as crucibles.
