= Otlukkapı, Pasinler =

Village in Turkey

Otlukkapı
- Neighbourhood
- Location in Turkey
- Coordinates: 39°53′50″N 41°40′14″E
- Country: Turkey
- Province: Erzurum
- District: Pasinler
- Population (2022): 400
- Time zone: UTC+3 (TRT)

Otlukkapı is a neighbourhood in the municipality and district of Pasinler, Erzurum Province in Turkey. Its population is 400 (2022).
