= Hanahmet, Pasinler =

Village in Turkey

Hanahmet
- Neighbourhood
- Location in Turkey
- Coordinates: 40°08′N 41°39′E
- Country: Turkey
- Province: Erzurum
- District: Pasinler
- Population (2022): 48
- Time zone: UTC+3 (TRT)

Hanahmet is a neighbourhood in the municipality and district of Pasinler, Erzurum Province in Turkey. Its population is 48 (2022).
