= Altınbaşak, Pasinler =

Village in Turkey

Altınbaşak
- Neighbourhood
- Location in Turkey
- Coordinates: 39.9438°N 41.7270°E
- Country: Turkey
- Province: Erzurum
- District: Pasinler
- Population (2022): 1,071
- Time zone: UTC+3 (TRT)

Altınbaşak is a neighbourhood in the municipality and district of Pasinler, Erzurum Province in Turkey. Its population is 1,071 (2022).
