= Demirdöven, Pasinler =

Village in Turkey

Demirdöven
- Neighbourhood
- Location in Turkey
- Coordinates: 40°01′59″N 41°43′52″E
- Country: Turkey
- Province: Erzurum
- District: Pasinler
- Population (2022): 1,045
- Time zone: UTC+3 (TRT)

Demirdöven is a neighbourhood in the municipality and district of Pasinler, Erzurum Province in Turkey. Its population is 1,045 (2022).
