= Shunyakovo =

Shunyakovo Шуняково
- Village
- Location within Bashkortostan Location within Russia
- Coordinates: 55°46′N 55°23′E
- Country: Russia
- Region: Bashkortostan
- District: Burayevsky District
- Time zone: UTC+5:00

Shunyakovo (Russian: Шуняково; Bashkir: Шүнәк, Şünäk) is a rural locality (a village) in Burayevsky Selsoviet, Burayevsky District, Bashkortostan, Russia. The population was 15 as of 2010. There is 1 street.

== Geography ==
Shunyakovo is located 9 km south of Burayevo (the district's administrative centre) by road. Shabayevo is the nearest rural locality.
