= Sunak, Pasinler =

Village in Turkey

Sunak
- Neighbourhood
- Location in Turkey
- Coordinates: 39°56′13″N 41°44′54″E
- Country: Turkey
- Province: Erzurum
- District: Pasinler
- Population (2022): 148
- Time zone: UTC+3 (TRT)

Sunak is a neighbourhood in the municipality and district of Pasinler, Erzurum Province in Eastern Turkey. Its population is 148 (2022).

== History ==
According to Sevan Nişanyan, there are records of the village dating as far back as the 11th century and the village population consisted of Armenians until early 20th century. It was formerly named "Plur" or "Pulur", an Armenian-language name meaning "ancient ruins".

== Economy ==
Cattle herding is a source of income in the village. In the early 2010s, a rural development cooperative was founded in the village to encourage the herding of higher-yield cattle and distribute new cattle amongst the village population.

The village is home to the Sunak Fahrettin Aslan Primary School.
