= Veslebjørn =

Mountain in Innlandet, Norway

- Interactive map of the mountain

Highest point
- Elevation: 2,150 m (7,050 ft)
- Prominence: 95 m (312 ft)
- Parent peak: Storebjørn
- Isolation: 0.734 km (0.456 mi)
- Coordinates: 61°33′19″N 8°07′40″E

Geography
- Location: Innlandet, Norway
- Parent range: Jotunheimen
- Topo map: 1518 II Galdhøpiggen

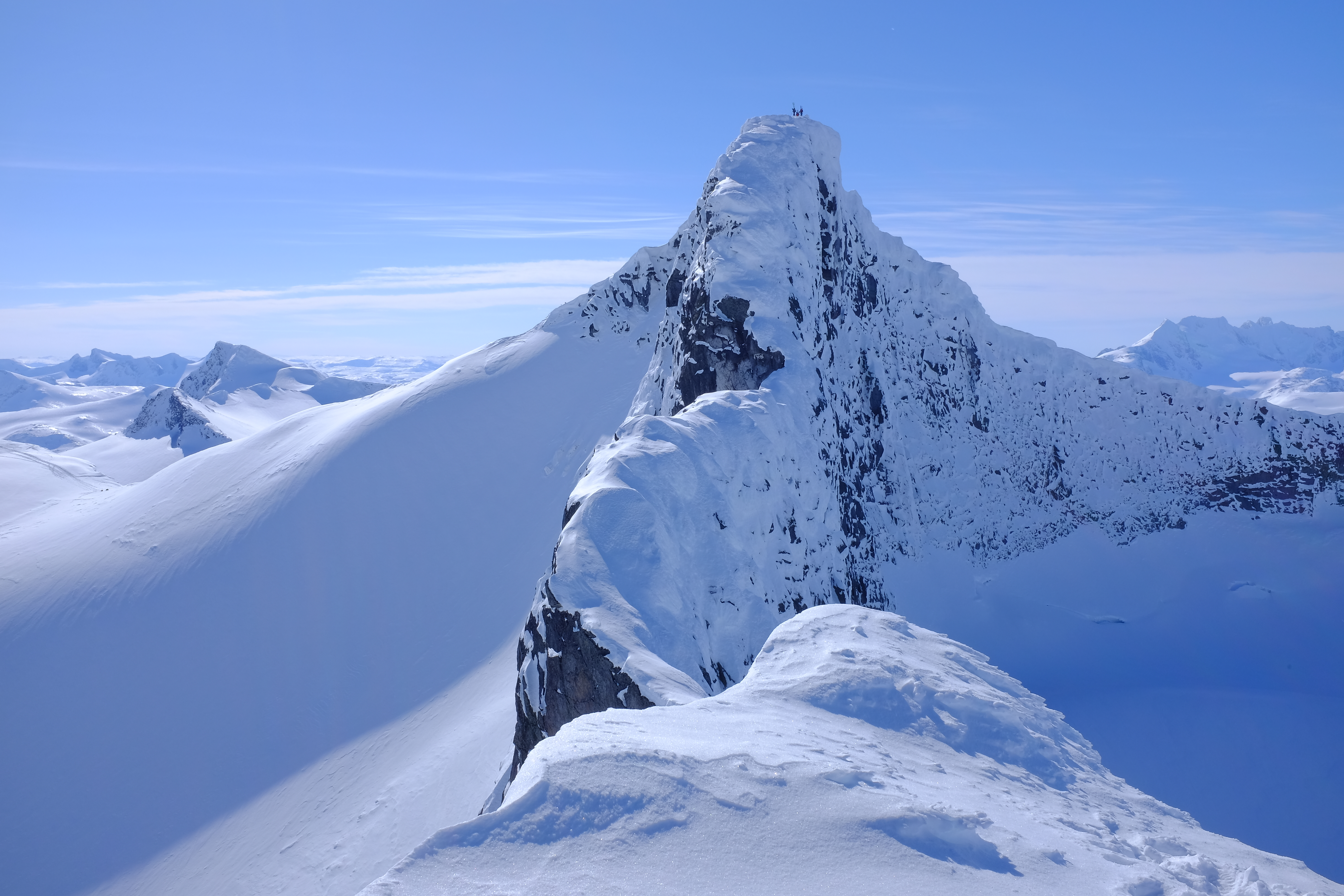
Veslebjørn Mountain

Veslebjørn is a mountain in Lom Municipality in Innlandet county, Norway. The 2,150-metre (7,050 ft) tall mountain is located in the Jotunheimen mountains within Jotunheimen National Park. The mountain sits about 40 kilometres (25 mi) southwest of the village of Fossbergom and about 33 kilometres (21 mi) northeast of the village of Øvre Årdal. The mountain lies in the Smørstabbtindene mountains and it is surrounded by several other notable mountains including Rundhøe to the northeast; Stetinden and Stehøe to the east; Gravdalstinden and Storebjørn to the south; Kalven to the west; and Sokse, Kniven, and Store Smørstabbtinden to the north.

== See also ==
- List of mountains of Norway by height
