= Saksı, Pasinler =

Village in Turkey

Saksı
- Neighbourhood
- Location in Turkey
- Coordinates: 40.00206°N 41.47369°E
- Country: Turkey
- Province: Erzurum
- District: Pasinler
- Population (2022): 228
- Time zone: UTC+3 (TRT)

Saksı is a neighbourhood in the municipality and district of Pasinler, Erzurum Province in Turkey. Its population is 228 (2022).
