= Tverrbottindene =

Mountain in Innlandet, Norway

- Interactive map of the mountain

Highest point
- Elevation: 2,162 m (7,093 ft)
- Prominence: 282 m (925 ft)
- Parent peak: Galdhøpiggen
- Isolation: 2.5 km (1.6 mi)
- Coordinates: 61°34′32″N 8°15′19″E

Geography
- Location: Innlandet, Norway
- Parent range: Jotunheimen
- Topo map: 1518 II Galdhøpiggen

Tverrbottindene is a mountain ridge with a number of high peaks in Lom Municipality in Innlandet county, Norway. The 2,162-metre-tall (7,093 ft) mountain is located in the Jotunheimen mountains within Jotunheimen National Park. The mountain sits about 34 kilometres (21 mi) southwest of the village of Fossbergom and about 37 kilometres (23 mi) northeast of the village of Øvre Årdal. The mountain is surrounded by several other notable mountains including Tverrbytthornet to the southeast, Kyrkja to the south, Stehøe and Stetinden to the southwest, Smørstabbtindene to the west, and Store Bukkeholstinden.

The main peaks of the mountain ridge include:

- Store Tverrbottindan, which reaches 2,161 metres (7,090 ft) above sea level
- Søre Tverrbottindan, which reaches 1,976 metres (6,483 ft) above sea level
- Midtre Tverrbottindan Nord, which reaches 2,151 metres (7,057 ft) above sea level
- Midtre Tverrbottindan Sør, which reaches 2,106 metres (6,909 ft) above sea level
- Vestre Tverrbottinden, which reaches 2,113 metres (6,932 ft) above sea level

== See also ==
- List of mountains of Norway by height
