= Kyrkjeoksle =

Mountain in Innlandet, Norway

- Kyrkjeoksli (unofficial)
- Interactive map of the mountain

Highest point
- Elevation: 1,843 m (6,047 ft)
- Prominence: 70 m (230 ft)
- Parent peak: Visbreatinden
- Isolation: 0.671 km (0.417 mi)
- Coordinates: 61°31′58″N 8°17′40″E

Geography
- Location: Innlandet, Norway
- Parent range: Jotunheimen
- Topo map: 1518 II Galdhøpiggen

Kyrkjeoksle is a mountain in Lom Municipality in Innlandet county, Norway. The 1,843-metre (6,047 ft) tall mountain is located in the Jotunheimen mountains within Jotunheimen National Park. The mountain sits about 35 kilometres (22 mi) south of the village of Fossbergom and about 35 kilometres (22 mi) northeast of the village of Øvre Årdal. The mountain is surrounded by several other notable mountains including Urdadalstindan, Visbreatinden, and Semelholstinden to the east; Langvasshøe to the southeast; Skarddalstinden and Høgvagltindane to the south; Stehøe and Stetinden to the northwest; and Kyrkja, Tverrbottindene, and Tverrbytthornet to the north.

== See also ==
- List of mountains of Norway by height
