= Agni Sakshi =

Agni Sakshi or Agnisakshi (lit. 'marriage vows') may refer to:

- Agnisakshi (novel), an Indian novel by Lalithambika Antharjanam
- Agni Sakshi (1982 film), an Indian Tamil-language psychological drama
- Agni Sakshi (1996 film), an Indian Hindi-language film
- Agnisakshi (1999 film), an Indian Malayalam-language film based on the novel
- Agnisakshi (TV series), an Indian Kannada-language soap opera aired on Colors Kannada
