= Pasinler =

- District and municipality
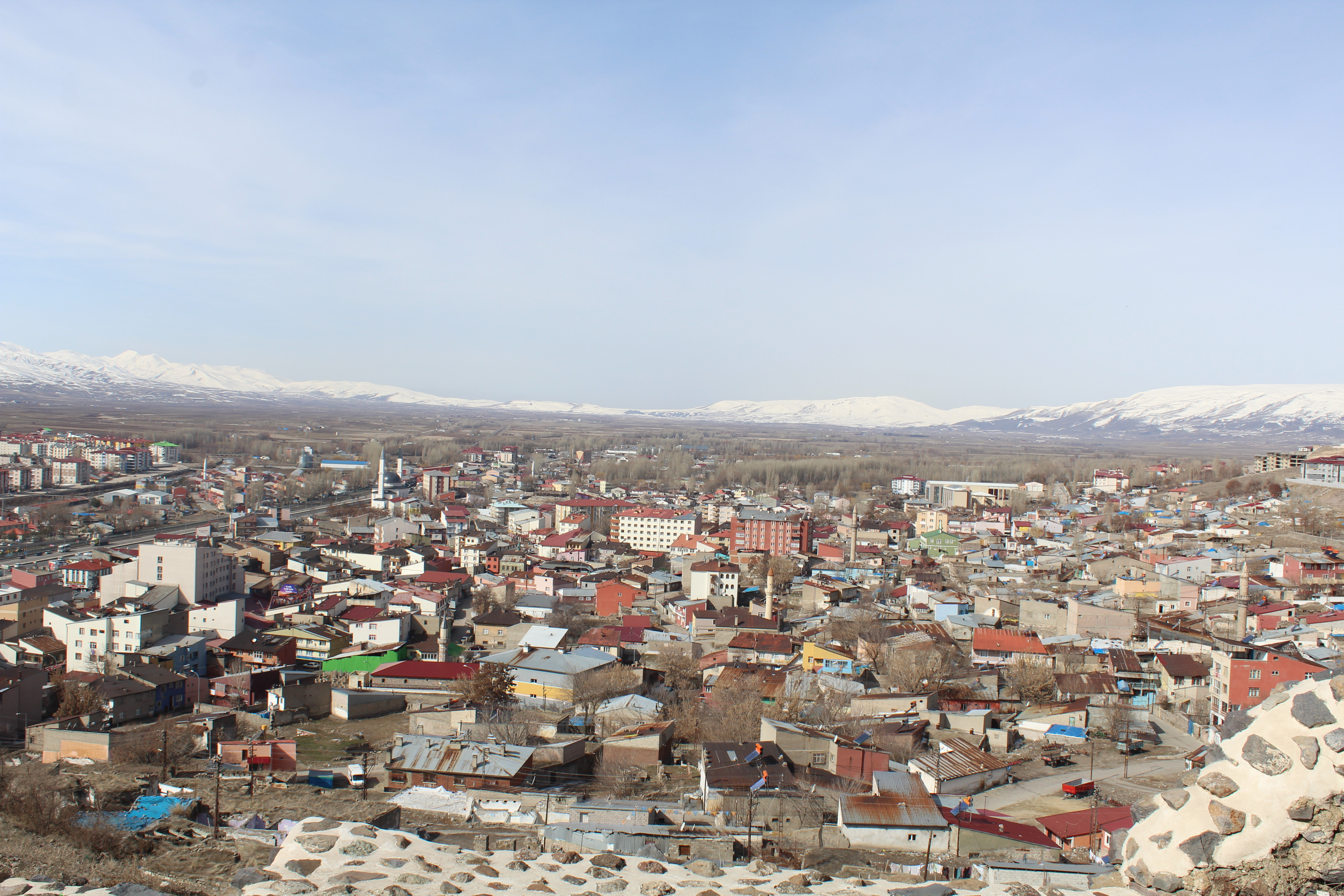

- Logo

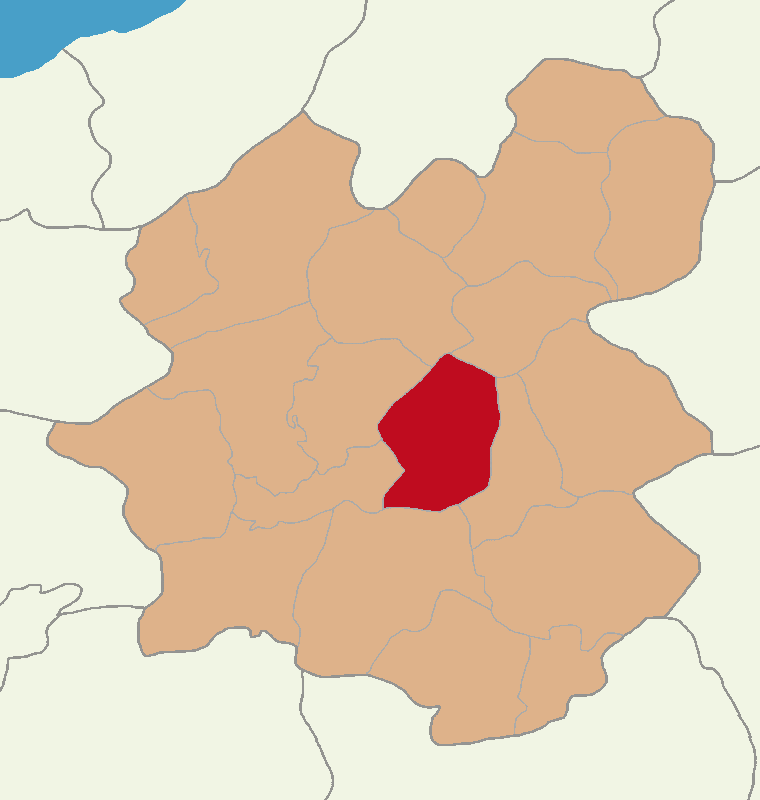
- Map showing Pasinler District in Erzurum Province

- Location within Turkey
- Coordinates: 39°58′47″N 41°40′32″E
- Country: Turkey
- Province: Erzurum

Government
  - Mayor: Ahmet Dölekli (AKP)
- Area: 1,134 km^{2} (438 sq mi)
- Population (2022): 27,055
  - Density: 23.86/km^{2} (61.79/sq mi)
- Time zone: UTC+3 (TRT)
- Postal code: 25300
- Area code: 0442
- Climate: Dfb
- Website: www.pasinler.bel.tr

Pasinler or Basean (Turkish: Pasinler; Armenian: Բասէն, romanized: Pasēn; Georgian: ბასიანი, romanized: basiani; Latin: Phasiani; Greek: Φασιανοί, romanized: Phasianoí; formerly Hasankale and Hesenqele 'the fortress of Hasan'), is a municipality and district of Erzurum Province, Turkey. Its area is 1,134 km^{2}, and its population is 27,055 (2022). It lies on the Aras River.

It is located 40 kilometres (25 mi) east of the city of Erzurum and is the site of Hasankale Castle (sometimes called Pasinler Castle). It was the birthplace of the Ottoman poet Nef'i. The old name "Hasankale" may be based upon the Aq Qoyunlu ruler Uzun Hasan or upon Hasan the governor of the region in the 1330s or after Küçük Hasan, grandson of Coban, who attacked the town in 1340.

== History ==
The first ancient kingdom that had a control of this territory was Urartu, when it was called Biani. One of the versions of the name Pasinler - it is derived from the ancient tribe called Phasians (Phazians). The name of this tribe seems to have survived in latter-day regional toponyms – Armenian Passen, Greek Phasiane, Georgian Basiani, and Turkish Pasin. Based upon pottery finds, Pasinler was part of the Kingdom of Urartu during the Iron Age.

The territory of Basean belonged to Greater Armenia from 4th century BC to 5th century AD and was part of an Armenian province - Ayrarat. According to the Armenian chronicler Movses Khorenatsi (5th century), this land was the family estate of the Armenian Ordun dynasty, established by Armenian King Vagharshak, who ruled in 117 - 138/140 AD. In the story of the Armenian chronicler Favstos Buzand (5th century), the thief of the Orduni clan attacked the power of King Khosrov III, seizing and destroying the royal house, as a result of which the princes of the Orduni clan were executed by order of Khosrov. Their ancestral lands, located in the area of Basean, with all their bounds, were given to the bishop of Basean, a native of Ordor. After AD 428 this land became part of Sasanian Armenia, right up to the Arab invasions in 7th-9th centuries. In 9th century Basean became part of Bagratid Armenia.

In the 10th century, the border between the Byzantine Empire and expanding early Georgian Kingdom of Tao-Klarjeti ran along the Aras river, therefore part of northern Basean/Basiani became a domain of the Georgian Bagratids. In 1001, after the death of David Kuropalates, Basean/Basiani was acquired by the Byzantine Emperor Basil II, who annexed the Armenian lands (Tayk/Tao, Basean/Basiani), previously subdued by King David Kuropalates. and organised them into the theme of Iberia with the capital at Theodosiopolis. However, after the formation of the Georgian Kingdom, Bagrat’s son George I inherited a longstanding claim to David's succession. While Basil was preoccupied with his Bulgarian campaigns, George gained momentum to invade Tayk/Tao and Basean/Basiani in 1014, which sparked his unsuccessful Byzantine-Georgian wars. Despite the territorial losses to Basil II, many of the territories ceded to the empire were overrun by the Seljuk Turks in the 1070s and 1080s, but were then retaken by the Georgian King David IV. In the 13th century, at Battle of Basian, thevGeorgians defeated the army of the Rum Sultanate. The province was part of the united Kingdom of Georgia as an ordinary duchy until 1545, when Basiani was conquered by the Ottoman Empire. The Ottomans made Hasankale the centre of a sanjak and entirely rebuilt the citadel. They also built several mosques such as Ulucami (1554 repaired in 1836), Sivasli (1388 rebuild in 1912) Yeni (16th century rebuild in 1810) and baths. Other sights are the Coban bridge likely built in 1297 by a notable Ilkhanid Mongol named Coban and which was later restored several times. There are also two Islamic tombs near the town, Ferrah Hatun built in 1324 and the other likely in the 13th century. The nearby location of Avnik, has a ruined citadel with an old Muslim cemetery and mosque.

During the 19th century, several Russo-Ottoman wars took place in this region and as a consequence many Armenians emigrated from this region to Russian held territory in Transcaucasia. When the First World War broke out the Russians advanced to the plain of Pasinler but quickly retreated together with many of the local Armenian population, some 4,000 remained and were expelled or murdered during the Armenian Genocide. Between 1915 and 1918 it was occupied by Russia and then, after the Bolshevik revolution, held by Armenian forces. Turkish forces regained control of the town on 13 March 1918.

== Composition ==
There are 72 neighbourhoods in Pasinler District:

- Acı
- Ağaçminare
- Ağcalar
- Altınbaşak
- Alvar
- Ardıçlı
- Aşıtlar
- Bahçelievler
- Baldızı
- Başören
- Bulkasım
- Büyükdere
- Büyüktüy
- Çakırtaş
- Çalıyazı
- Camiikebir
- Çamlıca
- Çiçekli
- Çöğender
- Demirdöven
- Emirşeyh
- Epsemce
- Erzurumkapı
- Esendere
- Gerdekkaya
- Gölciğez
- Hanahmet
- Hasandede
- Kaplıcalar
- Karakale
- Karavelet
- Kasımpaşa
- Kavuşturan
- Kethuda
- Kevenlik
- Kızılören
- Kotandüzü
- Küçüktüy
- Kurbançayırı
- Kurtuluş
- Otlukkapı
- Ovaköy
- Övenler
- Paşabey
- Pelitli
- Porsuk
- Pusudere
- Reşadiye
- Saksı
- Şehit Burak Karakoç
- Serçeboğazı
- Sivas
- Sunak
- Taşağıl
- Taşkaynak
- Taşlıgüney
- Taşlıyurt
- Tepecik
- Timar
- Üğümü
- Uzunark
- Yamaç
- Yastıktepe
- Yavuzlu
- Yayla
- Yayladağ
- Yeni
- Yeniköy
- Yiğitpınarı
- Yiğittaşı
- Yukarıçakmak
- Yukarıdanişment

== Şehit Burak Karakoç ==
Şehit Burak Karakoç (formerly: Korucuk) is a neighbourhood in the municipality and district of Pasinler, Erzurum Province in Turkey. Its population is 199 (2022).

== People from Pasinler ==
- Fethullah Gülen (1941–2024), Turkish preacher, imam, religious leader, founder of the Gülen movement.
