= Sokse =

Mountain in Innlandet, Norway

- Saksi (unofficial)
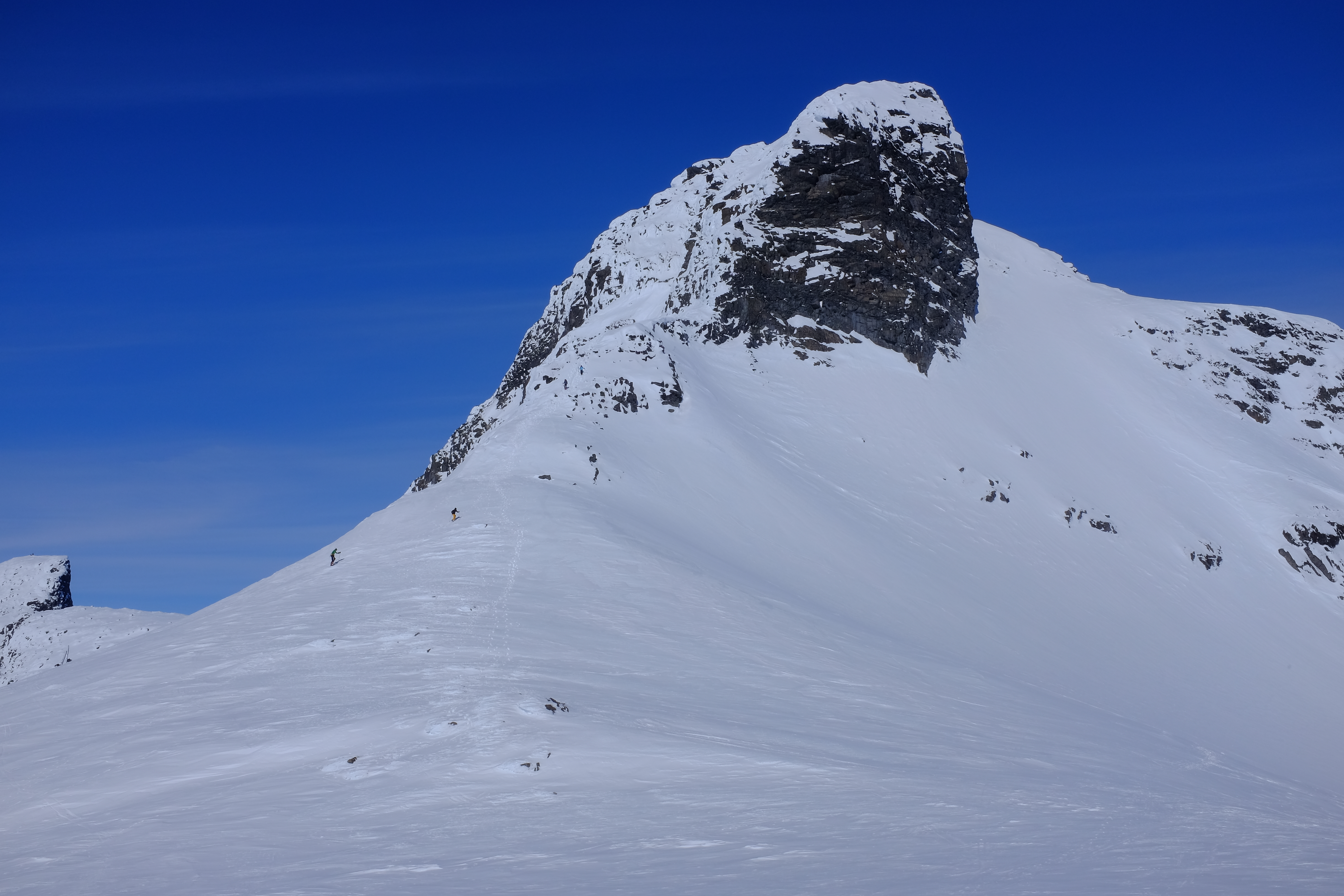

Highest point
- Elevation: 2,189 m (7,182 ft)
- Prominence: 179 m (587 ft)
- Parent peak: Storebjørn
- Isolation: 0.322 km (0.200 mi)
- Coordinates: 61°33′42″N 8°08′01″E

Geography
- Interactive map of the mountain
- Location: Innlandet, Norway
- Parent range: Jotunheimen
- Topo map: 1518 II Galdhøpiggen

Climbing
- First ascent: 1886 Carl Hall, Mathias Soggemoen

Sokse is a mountain in Lom Municipality in Innlandet county, Norway. The 2,189-metre (7,182 ft) tall mountain is located in the Jotunheimen mountains within Jotunheimen National Park. The mountain sits about 40 kilometres (25 mi) southwest of the village of Fossbergom and about 33 kilometres (21 mi) northeast of the village of Øvre Årdal. The mountain lies in the Smørstabbtindene mountains and it is surrounded by several other notable mountains including Rundhøe to the northeast; Stetinden and Stehøe to the southeast; Gravdalstinden, Storebjørn, and Veslebjørn to the south; Kalven to the southwest; and Kniven and Store Smørstabbtinden to the north. The first known ascent was in 1886 by Carl Hall and Mathias Soggemoen.

== See also ==
- List of mountains in Norway by height
