= Storebjørn =

Mountain in Innlandet, Norway

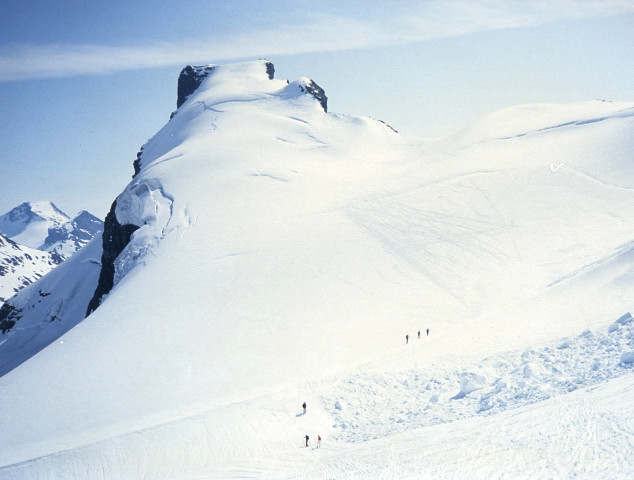
- Summit seen from the north.

Highest point
- Elevation: 2,222 m (7,290 ft)
- Prominence: 804 m (2,638 ft)
- Isolation: 8.7 km (5.4 mi) to Bukkehøe
- Coordinates: 61°32′53″N 8°08′13″E

Geography
- Interactive map of the mountain
- Location: Innlandet, Norway
- Parent range: Jotunheimen
- Topo map: 1518 II Galdhøpiggen

Climbing
- First ascent: 14 August 1884, Carl Christian Hall and Mathias Soggemoen

Storebjørn (lit. 'Big Bear') is a mountain in Lom Municipality in Innlandet county, Norway. The 2,222-metre (7,290 ft) tall mountain is located in the Jotunheimen mountains within Jotunheimen National Park. The mountain sits about 40 kilometres (25 mi) southwest of the village of Fossbergom and about 33 kilometres (21 mi) northeast of the village of Øvre Årdal. The mountain lies in the Smørstabbtindene mountains and it is surrounded by several other notable mountains including Rundhøe to the northeast; Stetinden and Stehøe to the east; Gravdalstinden to the south; Kalven to the northwest; and Veslebjørn, Sokse, Kniven, and Store Smørstabbtinden to the north.

== See also ==
- List of mountains of Norway by height
