= Kniven =

Mountain in Innlandet, Norway

- Vesle Smørstabbtinden
- Interactive map of the mountain

Highest point
- Elevation: 2,133 m (6,998 ft)
- Prominence: 98 m (322 ft)
- Parent peak: Sokse
- Isolation: 0.521 km (0.324 mi) to Store Smørstabbtinden
- Coordinates: 61°34′05″N 8°07′30″E

Geography
- Location: Innlandet, Norway
- Parent range: Jotunheimen
- Topo map: 1518 II Galdhøpiggen

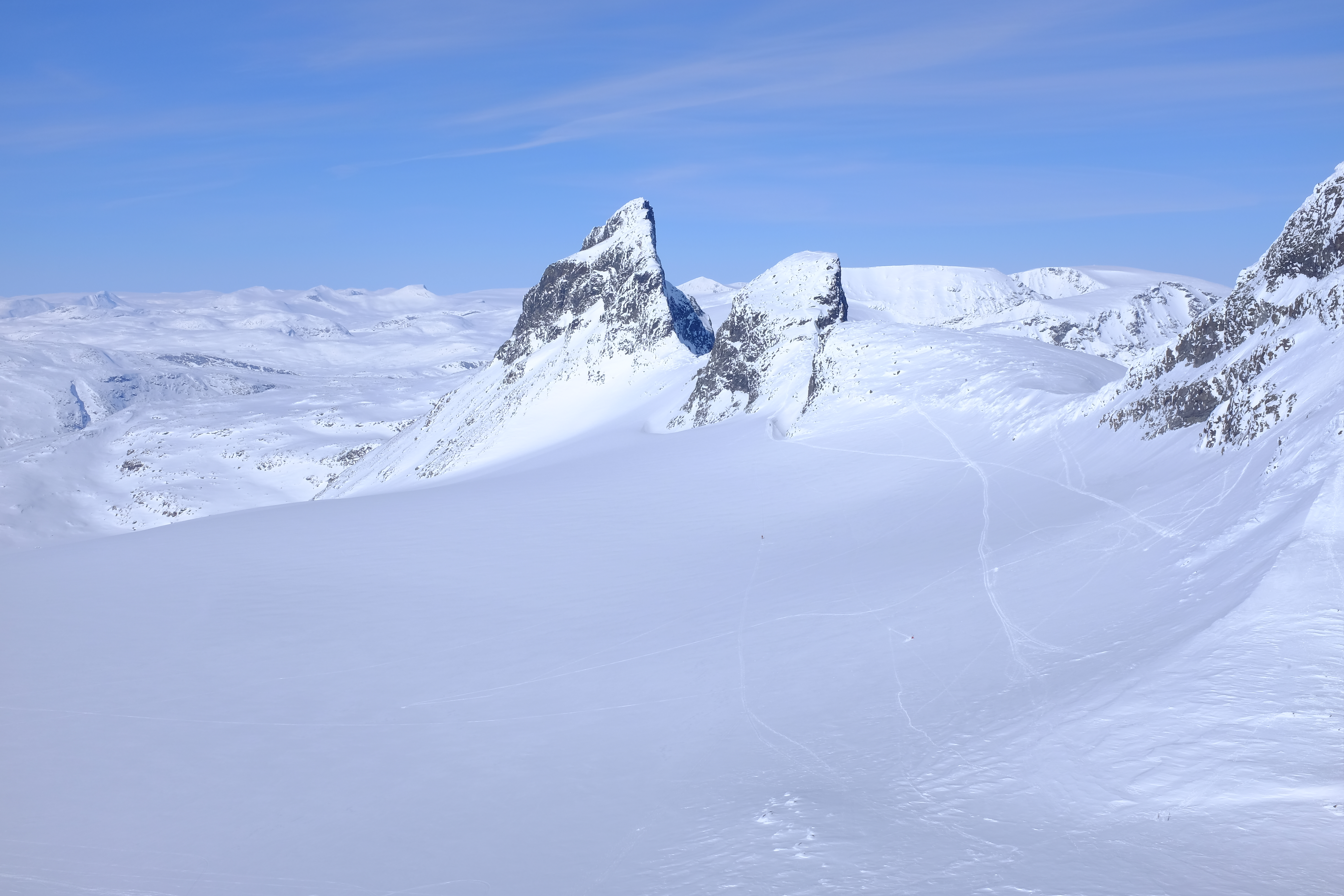
Store Smørstabbtinden and Kniven mountains in Jotunheimen Nasjonal Park, Norway.

Kniven is a mountain in Lom Municipality in Innlandet county, Norway. The 2,133-metre (6,998 ft) tall mountain is located in the Jotunheimen mountains within Jotunheimen National Park. The mountain sits about 40 kilometres (25 mi) southwest of the village of Fossbergom and about 33 kilometres (21 mi) northeast of the village of Øvre Årdal. The mountain lies in the Smørstabbtindene mountains and it is surrounded by several other notable mountains including Rundhøe to the east; Stetinden and Stehøe to the southeast; Sokse, Veslebjørn, Storebjørn to the south; Kalven to the southwest; and Store Smørstabbtinden to the north.

== See also ==
- List of mountains of Norway by height
