= Tverrbytthornet =

Mountain in Innlandet, Norway

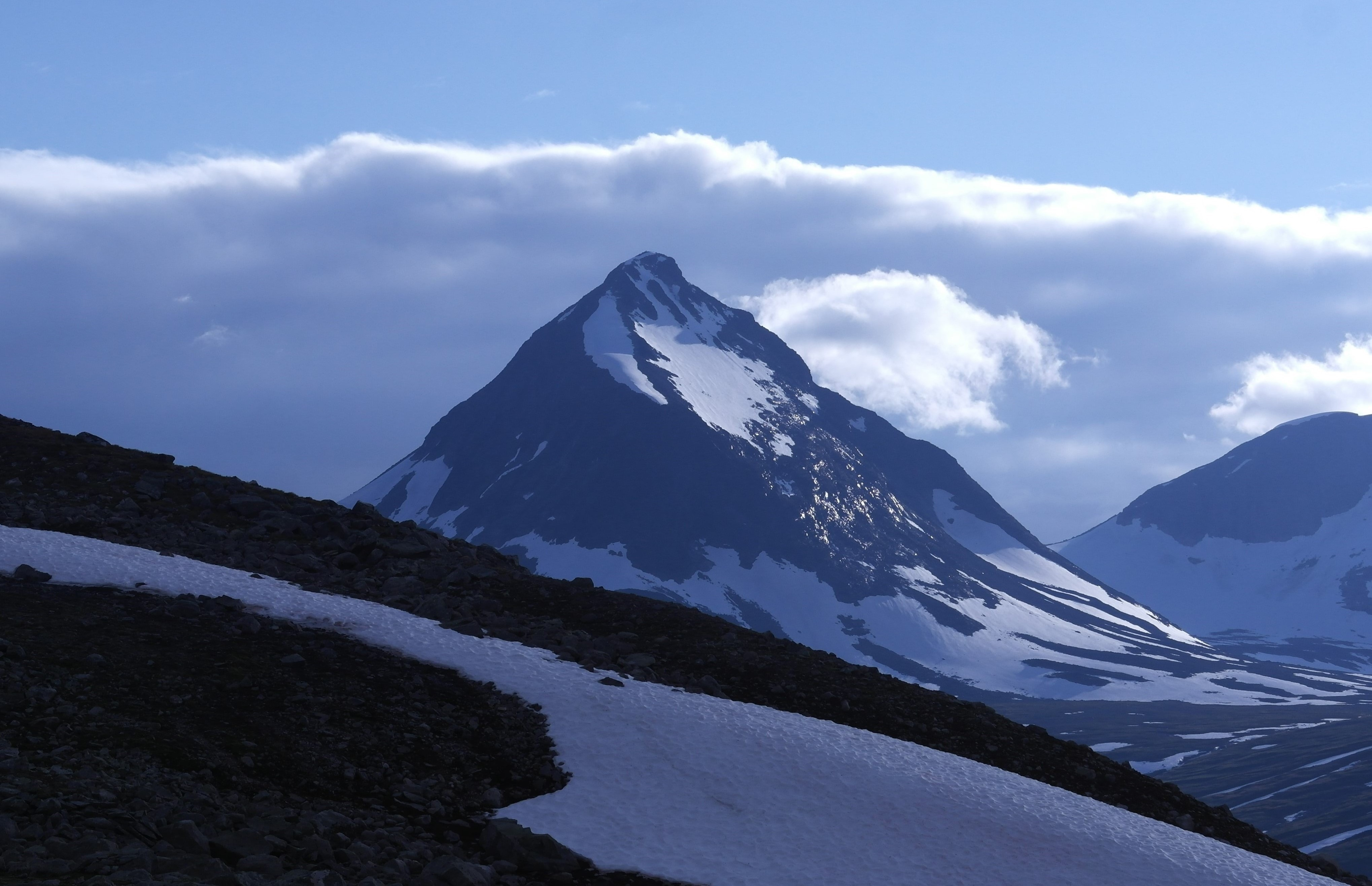

Highest point
- Elevation: 2,103 m (6,900 ft)
- Prominence: 264 m (866 ft)
- Parent peak: Galdhøpiggen
- Isolation: 2.2 km (1.4 mi) to Tverrbottindene
- Coordinates: 61°33′28″N 8°18′25″E

Geography
- Interactive map of the mountain
- Location: Innlandet, Norway
- Parent range: Jotunheimen
- Topo map: 1518 II Galdhøpiggen

Tverrbytthornet is a mountain in Lom Municipality in Innlandet county, Norway. The 2,103-metre (6,900 ft) tall mountain is located in the Jotunheimen mountains within Jotunheimen National Park. The mountain sits about 34 kilometres (21 mi) southwest of the village of Fossbergom and about 40 kilometres (25 mi) northeast of the village of Øvre Årdal. The mountain is surrounded by several other notable mountains including Kyrkja and Kyrkjeoksle to the south; Tverrbottindene to the northwest; Store Bukkeholstinden to the north; Bukkeholshøe to the northeast; Nørdre Hellstugutinden to the east; and Urdadalstindan, Semelholstinden, and Visbreatinden to the southeast.

== See also ==
- List of mountains of Norway by height
