= Stetinden (Lom) =

Mountain in Innlandet, Norway

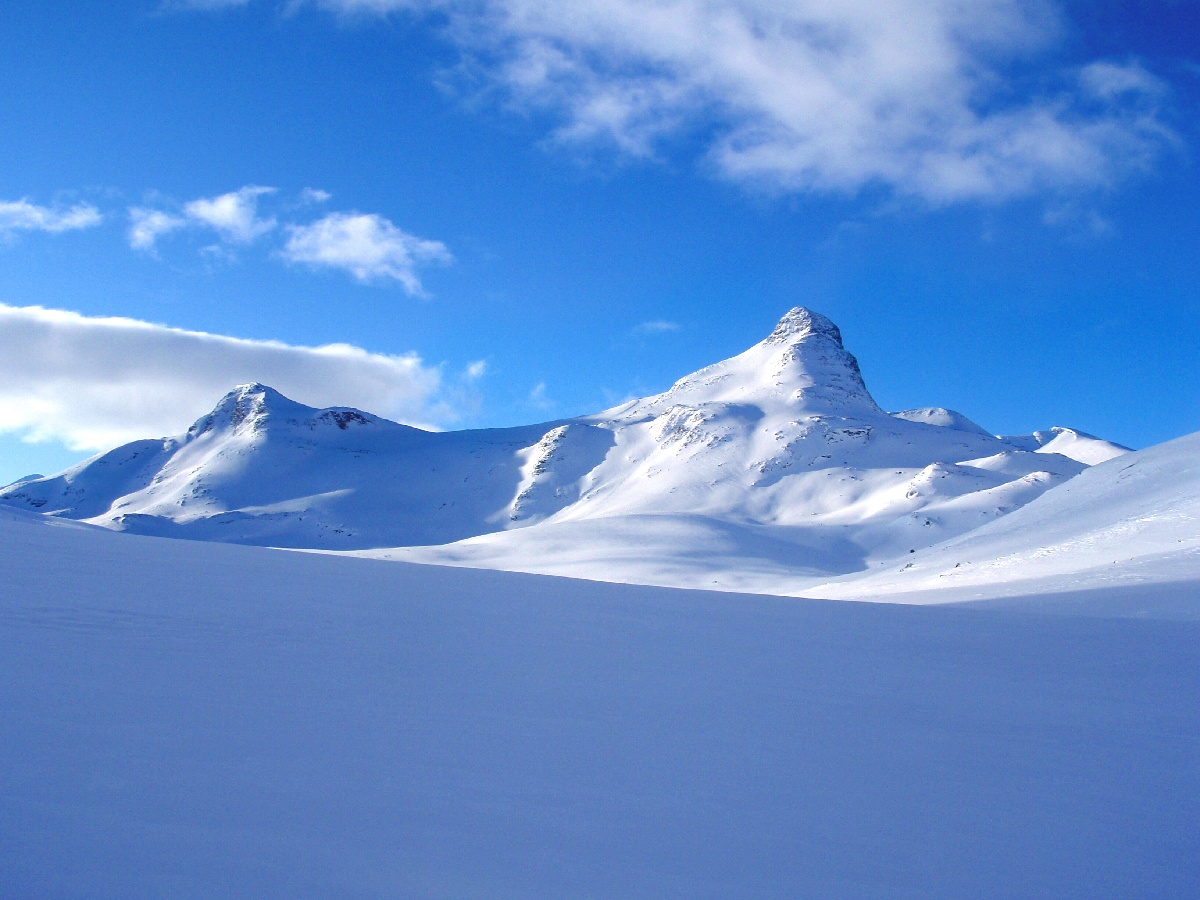
- Stetinden in Jotunheimen, Norway, seen from Leirdalen in the east. On the left a nameless summit at 1985 meters.

Highest point
- Elevation: 2,020 m (6,630 ft)
- Prominence: 456 m (1,496 ft)
- Parent peak: Storebjørn
- Isolation: 2.9 km (1.8 mi) to Storebjørn
- Coordinates: 61°32′51″N 8°11′43″E

Geography
- Interactive map of the mountain
- Location: Innlandet, Norway
- Parent range: Jotunheimen
- Topo map: 1518 II Galdhøpiggen

Stetinden is a mountain on the border of Luster Municipality in Vestland county and Lom Municipality in Innlandet county, Norway. The 2,020-metre (6,630 ft) tall mountain is located in the Jotunheimen mountains within Jotunheimen National Park. The mountain sits about 38 kilometres (24 mi) southwest of the village of Fossbergom and about 34 kilometres (21 mi) northeast of the village of Øvre Årdal. The mountain is surrounded by several other notable mountains including Kyrkja, Kyrkjeoksle, and Høgvagltindane to the southeast; Surtningstinden, Gravdalstinden, and Søre Smørstabbtindan to the southwest; Storebjørn and Veslebjørn to the west; Smørstabbtindan, Sokse, and Kniven to the northwest; Rundhøe and Sauhøe to the north; Tverrbottindene to the northeast; and Tverrbytthornet to the east.

== See also ==
- List of mountains of Norway by height
