= Høgvagltindane =

Mountain group in Norway

Highest point
- Peak: Midtre Høgvagltindane, Luster Municipality
- Elevation: 2,066 m (6,778 ft)
- Coordinates: 61.50493°N 8.26055°E

Geography
- Location: Jotunheimen, Norway
- Range coordinates: 61.50775°N 8.26698°E

Høgvagltindane is a mountain group on the border of Lom Municipality in Innlandet county and Luster Municipality in Vestland county, Norway. The group includes three main peaks: Vestre Høgvagltindane, Midtre Høgvagltindane, and Austre Høgvagltindane. The highest peak in the group is the 2,066-metre (6,778 ft) tall Midtre Høgvagltinden. The mountains are located in the Jotunheimen mountains within Jotunheimen National Park. The mountains sit about 41 kilometres (25 mi) southwest of the village of Fossbergom and about 33 kilometres (21 mi) northeast of the village of Øvre Årdal. The mountains are surrounded by several other notable mountains including Kyrkja, Kyrkjeoksle, and Langvasshøe to the northeast; Skarddalstinden and Skarddalseggje to the southeast; Rauddalstindane to the southwest; and Stehøe and Stetinden to the northwest.

== See also ==
- List of mountains of Norway by height
