= Smørstabbtindan =

Mountain in Innlandet, Norway

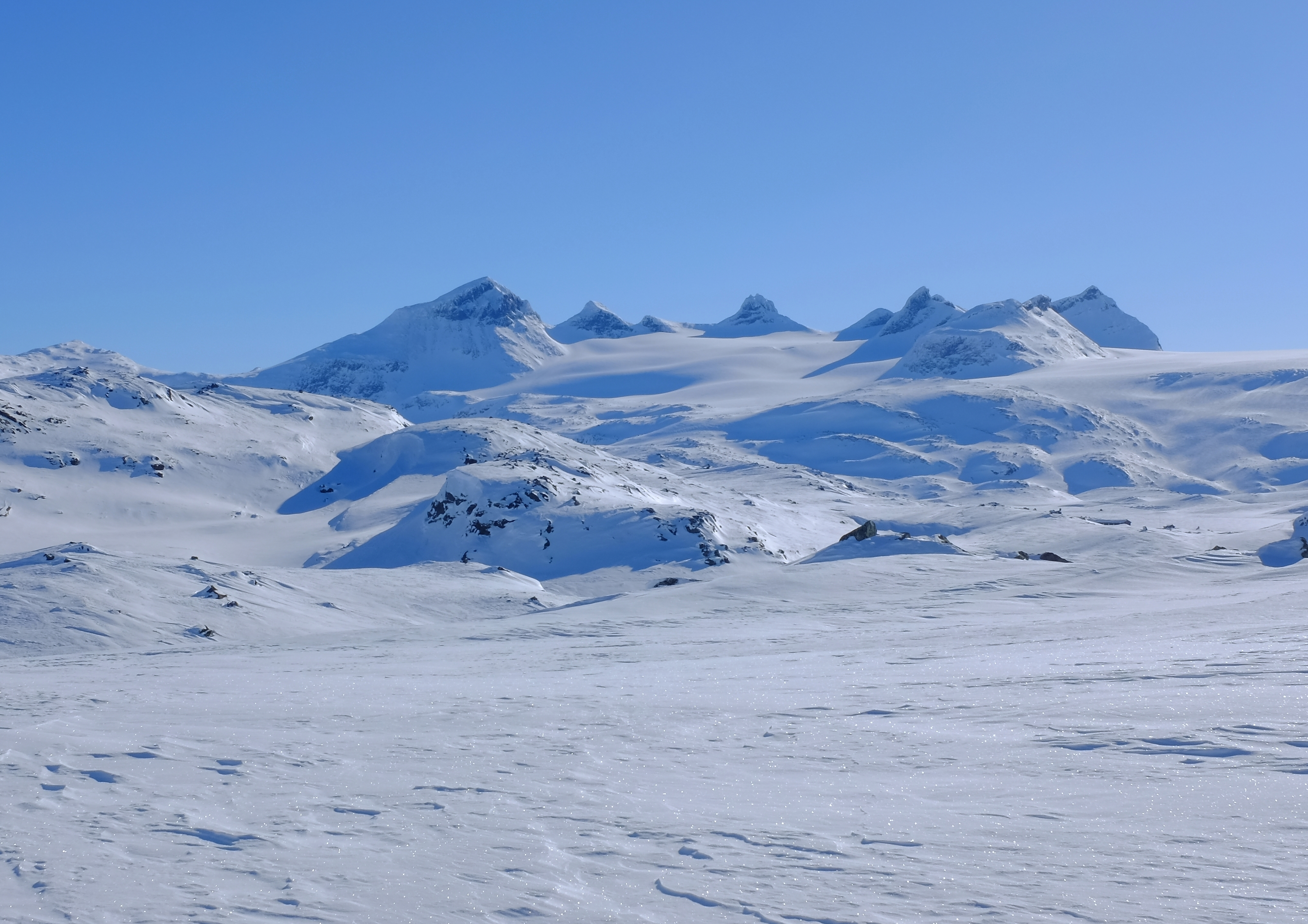
- Smørstabbtindan

Highest point
- Coordinates: 61°34′18″N 8°07′08″E

Geography
- Interactive map of the mountain
- Location: Innlandet, Norway
- Parent range: Jotunheimen
- Topo map: 1518 II Galdhøpiggen

Smørstabbtindan is a mountain group in Lom Municipality in Innlandet county, Norway. The highest mountain in the group is 2,222-metre (7,290 ft) tall. The group of mountains is located in the larger Jotunheimen mountain range and inside Jotunheimen National Park. The Smørstabbtindene mountains are traditionally thought of as the dividing line between the Sognefjellet and Jotunheimen mountains. The mountain group sits about 40 kilometres (25 mi) southwest of the village of Fossbergom and about 33 kilometres (21 mi) northeast of the village of Øvre Årdal.

The main peaks on the Smørstabbtindene range include:

- Storebjørn ("Big Bear"), 2,222 metres (7,290 ft)
- Store Smørstabbtinden, 2,208 metres (7,244 ft)
- Sokse, 2,159 metres (7,083 ft)
- Veslebjørn ("Little Bear"), 2,151 metres (7,057 ft)
- Kniven, 2,133 metres (6,998 ft)
- Skeie, 2,118 metres (6,949 ft)
- Kalven ("The Calf"), 2,034 metres (6,673 ft)
- Søre Smørstabbtinden, 2,021 metres (6,631 ft)
- Geite ("Goat"), 2,000 metres (6,600 ft)

== See also ==
- List of mountains of Norway by height
