= Kyrkja =

Mountain in Innlandet, Norway

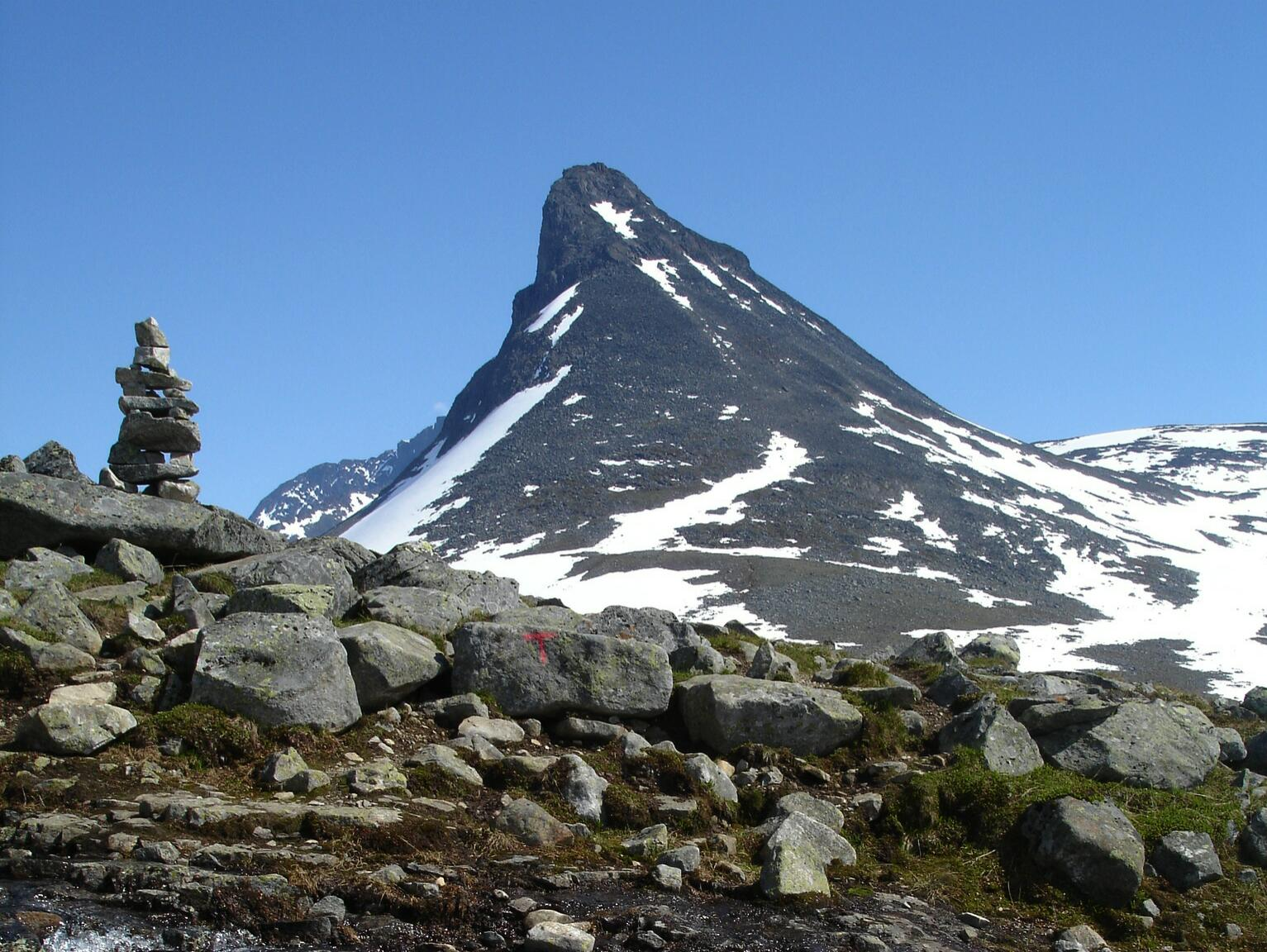
- View of the mountain

Highest point
- Elevation: 2,032 m (6,667 ft)
- Prominence: 278 m (912 ft)
- Parent peak: Visbreatinden
- Isolation: 1.8 km (1.1 mi) to Tverrbytthornet
- Coordinates: 61°32′29″N 8°17′31″E

Geography
- Interactive map of the mountain
- Location: Innlandet, Norway
- Parent range: Jotunheimen
- Topo map: 1518 II Galdhøpiggen

Kyrkja is a mountain in Lom Municipality in Innlandet county, Norway. The 2,032-metre (6,667 ft) tall mountain is located in the Jotunheimen mountains within Jotunheimen National Park. The mountain sits about 35 kilometres (22 mi) south of the village of Fossbergom and about 35 kilometres (22 mi) northeast of the village of Øvre Årdal. The mountain is surrounded by several other notable mountains including Urdadalstindan and Semelholstinden to the east; Kyrkjeoksle, Visbreatinden, and Langvasshøe to the southeast; Høgvagltindane to the south; Stehøe and Stetinden to the west; and Tverrbottindene and Tverrbytthornet to the north.

The mountain is named Kyrkja which means "The Church". This name was given because its peak is extremely steep and resembles a church spire.

Kyrkja was not thought to be climbable until the 19th-century, due to its steepness. Despite its slopes, climbing to the top is a day’s hike, helped by the rocks covering the mountainside. Kyrkja used to be covered in snow, but climate change has severely lessened the amount of snow on the mountain.

== See also ==
- List of mountains of Norway by height
