= Stehøe =

Mountain in Innlandet, Norway

- Interactive map of the mountain

Highest point
- Elevation: 1,884 m (6,181 ft)
- Prominence: 144 m (472 ft)
- Parent peak: Stetinden
- Isolation: 1.4 km (0.87 mi)
- Coordinates: 61°32′30″N 8°13′26″E

Geography
- Location: Innlandet, Norway
- Parent range: Jotunheimen
- Topo map: 1518 II Galdhøpiggen

Stehøe is a mountain on the border of Luster Municipality in Vestland county and Lom Municipality in Innlandet county, Norway. The 1,884-metre (6,181 ft) tall mountain is located in the Jotunheimen mountains within Jotunheimen National Park. The mountain sits about 38 kilometres (24 mi) southwest of the village of Fossbergom and about 34 kilometres (21 mi) northeast of the village of Øvre Årdal. The mountain is surrounded by several other notable mountains including Kyrkja and Kyrkjeoksle to the east, Høgvagltindane to the southeast, Surtningstinden and Gravdalstinden to the southwest, Smørstabbtindene and Stetinden to the northwest, and Tverrbottindene to the northeast.

== See also ==
- List of mountains of Norway by height
