= List of populated places in Erzurum Province =

List of places in Turkey

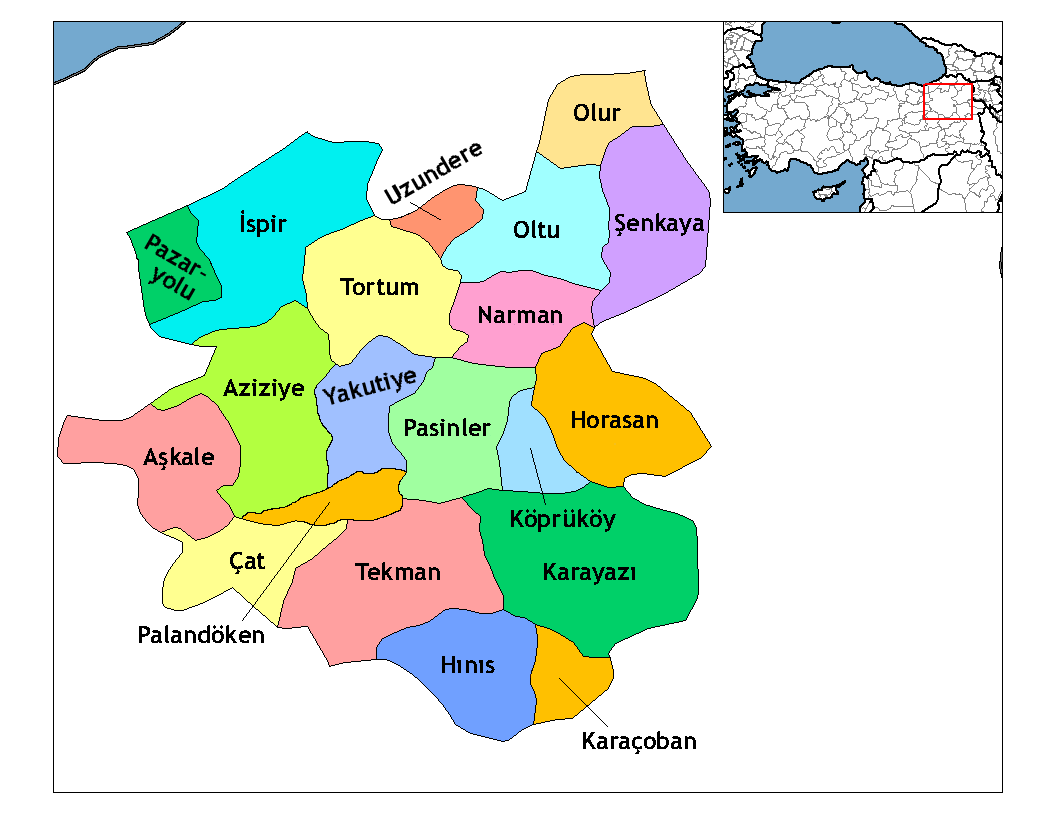
Map of Erzurum.

Below is the list of populated places in Erzurum Province of Turkey by the districts.

== Aşkale ==
Aşkale

- 3 Mart
- Abdalcık
- Akören
- Altıntaş
- Bahçelievler
- Ballıtaş
- Bozburun
- Büyükgeçit
- Cahitbayar
- Çarşı
- Çatalbayır
- Çatören
- Çayköy
- Çiftlik
- Dağyurdu
- Dallı
- Demirkıran
- Dereköy
- Düzyurt
- Emek
- Esentepe
- Eyüpoğlu
- Gökçebük
- Gölören
- Güllüdere
- Gümüşseren
- Güneyçam
- Gürkaynak
- Hacıbekir
- Hacıhamza
- Hacımahmut
- Halitpaşa
- Hatuncuk
- Haydarhacı
- İstasyon
- Kandilli
- Kapıkale
- Karahasan
- Karasu
- Kavurmaçukuru
- Kıbrıs
- Koçbaba
- Koşapınar
- Küçükgeçit
- Küçükova
- Kükürtlü
- Kurtmahmut
- Merdivenköy
- Meydan
- Mezrea
- Musadanışman
- Nahiye Gölören
- Ocaklı
- Ovacık
- Özler
- Pırnakapan
- Şafak
- Saptıran
- Sarıbaba
- Sazlı
- Taşağıl
- Taşlıçayır
- Tecer
- Tepsicik
- Tokça
- Topalçavuş
- Tosunlu
- Tozluca
- Turaç
- Yaylaköy
- Yaylayolu
- Yaylımlı
- Yeni
- Yeşilova
- Yumruveren

== Aziziye ==
Aziziye

- Adaçay
- Ağcakent
- Ağören
- Ahırcık
- Akdağ
- Akyazı
- Alaca
- Alaybeyi
- Aşağıcanören
- Aşağıyenice
- Atlıkonak
- Aynalıkale
- Başçakmak
- Başkent
- Başkurtdere
- Başovacık
- Beypınarı
- Bingöze
- Çamlıca
- Çatak
- Çavdarlı
- Çavuşoğlu
- Çiğdemli
- Çıkrıklı
- Dağdagül
- Demirgeçit
- Düztoprak
- Eğerti
- Elmalı
- Emrecik
- Eşkinkaya
- Eskipolat
- Gelinkaya
- Geyik
- Güllüce
- Halilkaya
- Ilıca
- Kabaktepe
- Kahramanlar
- Kapılı
- Karakale
- Kavaklıdere
- Kayapa
- Kızılkale
- Kumluyazı
- Kuşçu
- Kuzgun
- Kuzuluk
- Ocak
- Ömertepe
- Özbek
- Özbilen
- Paşayurdu
- Rizekent
- Sakalıkesik
- Saltuklu
- Sarıyazla
- Selçuklu
- Sırlı
- Söğütlü
- Sorkunlu
- Taşpınar
- Tebrizcik
- Tınazlı
- Toprakkale
- Üçköşe
- Yarımca
- Yeşilova
- Yeşilvadi
- Yoncalık
- Yukarıcanören

== Çat ==
Çat

- Ağaköy
- Aşağıçatköy
- Babaderesi
- Bağlıca
- Bardakçı
- Başköy
- Bayındır
- Bozyazı
- Budaklar
- Çayırtepe
- Çimenözü
- Çirişli
- Çukurçayır
- Değirmenli
- Elmapınar
- Göbekören
- Gökçeşeyh
- Gölköy
- Hatunköy
- Işkınlı
- Kaplıca
- Karabey
- Karaca
- Karaşeyh
- Kızılca
- Köseler
- Kumaşlı
- Kurbanlı
- Mollaömer
- Muratçayırı
- Oyuklu
- Parmaksız
- Saltaş
- Sarıkaşık
- Sarıkaya
- Şeyhhasan
- Söbeçayır
- Soğukpınar
- Taşağıl
- Tuzlataşı
- Tuzluca
- Yarmak
- Yavı
- Yaylasuyu
- Yukarıçat

== Hınıs ==
Hınıs

- Acarköy
- Akbayır
- Akçamelik
- Akgelin
- Akgöze
- Akören
- Alaca
- Alagöz
- Alikırı
- Alınteri
- Altınpınar
- Arpadere
- Aşağı Kayabaşı
- Avcılar
- Bahçe
- Başköy
- Bayırköy
- Bellitaş
- Beyyurdu
- Burhanköy
- Çakmak
- Çamurlu
- Çatak
- Çilligöl
- Dağçayırı
- Demirci
- Derince
- Dervişali
- Dibekli
- Dikili
- Divanhüseyin
- Elbeyli
- Elmadalı
- Erduran
- Erence
- Esenli
- Göller
- Güllüçimen
- Gülüstan
- Gürçayır
- Güzeldere
- Halilçavuş
- Hayran
- Ilıcaköy
- İsmail
- Kalecik
- Karaağaç
- Karabudak
- Karakula
- Karamolla
- Kazancı
- Ketenci
- Kısık
- Kızılahmet
- Kızmusa
- Kolhisar
- Kongur
- Köprübaşı
- Meydanköy
- Mezraa
- Mollacelil
- Mollakulaç
- Mutluca
- Ortaköy
- Ovaçevirme
- Ovakozlu
- Parmaksız
- Pınarbaşı
- Pınarköy
- Şahabettinköy
- Şahverdi
- Şalgamköy
- Saltepe
- Sanayi
- Sarılı
- Sıldız
- Söğütlü
- Sultanlı
- Suvaran
- Tanır
- Tapuköy
- Taşbulak
- Tellitepe
- Tipideresi
- Toprakkale
- Toraman
- Uluçayır
- Ünlüce
- Uyanık
- Yamanlar
- Yaylakonak
- Yelpiz
- Yenikent
- Yeniköy
- Yeşilbahçe
- Yeşilyazı
- Yolüstü
- Yukarı Kayabaşı

== Horasan ==
Horasan

- Adnanmenderes
- Ağıllı
- Akçataş
- Akçatoprak
- Alagöz
- Aliçeyrek
- Aras
- Ardı
- Arpaçayır
- Aşağıaktaş
- Aşağıbademözü
- Azap
- Bahçe
- Bulgurlu
- Camiikebir
- Çamlıkale
- Çamurlu
- Çayırdüzü
- Çiftlik
- Dalbaşı
- Danişment
- Değirmenler
- Dikili
- Döllek
- Dönertaş
- Eğertaşlar
- Esentepe
- Fatih Sultan Mehmet
- Gerek
- Gündeğer
- Güzelyayla
- Hacıahmet
- Hacıhalil
- Harçlı
- Hasanbaba
- Hasanbey
- Haydarlı
- Hızardere
- Hızırilyas
- İğdeli
- Iğırbığır
- İncesu
- İnönü
- Kadıcelal
- Kalender
- Karabıyık
- Karacaören
- Karaçuha
- Karapınar
- Kaynarca
- Kazım Karabekir
- Kemerli
- Kepenek
- Kırık
- Kırkdikme
- Kırkgözeler
- Kırklar
- Kızılca
- Kızlarkale
- Küçükkonak
- Kükürtlü
- Mollaahmet
- Mollamelik
- Mümtazturan
- Muratbağı
- Pinarli
- Pirali
- Pirhasan
- Recep Tayyip Erdoğan
- Saçlık
- Sekman
- Şerefiye
- Şeyhyusuf
- Tahirhoca
- Tavşancık
- Teknecik
- Yarboğaz
- Yaylacık
- Yazılıtaş
- Yeşildere
- Yeşilöz
- Yıldıran
- Yukarıbademözü
- Yukarıhorum
- Yukarıtahirhoca
- Yürükatlı
- Yüzören

== İspir ==
İspir

- Ahlatlı
- Akgüney
- Akpınar
- Akseki
- Aksu
- Aktaş
- Alacabük
- Araköy
- Ardıçlı
- Armutlu
- Aşağıfındıklı
- Aşağıözbağ
- Atürküten
- Avcıköy
- Bademli
- Bahçeli
- Başçeşme
- Başköy
- Başpınar
- Bostancı
- Bozan
- Çakmaklı
- Çamlıca
- Çamlıkaya
- Cankurtaran
- Çatakkaya
- Çayırbaşı
- Çayırözü
- Cibali
- Çiçekli
- Değirmendere
- Değirmenli
- Demirbilek
- Demirkaya
- Devedağı
- Duruköy
- Düzköy
- Elmalı
- Gaziler
- Geçitağzı
- Göçköy
- Gölyurt
- Gülhas
- Güllübağ
- Gündoğdu
- Güney
- Halilpaşa
- İkisu
- İncesu
- Irmakköy
- İyidere
- Karahan
- Karakale
- Karakamış
- Karakaya
- Karaseydi
- Karşıyaka
- Kavaklı
- Kaynakbaşı
- Kirazlı
- Kırık
- Kızılhasan
- Koçköy
- Köprüköy
- Kümetaş
- Leylekköy
- Madenköprübaşı
- Mescitli
- Meydanlı
- Moryayla
- Mülkköy
- Numanpaşa
- Ortaköy
- Ortaören
- Özlüce
- Öztoprak
- Petekli
- Pınarlı
- Sandıklı
- Şenköy
- Sırakonak
- Soğuksu
- Taşbaşı
- Taşlıca
- Tekpınar
- Tepecik
- Ulubel
- Ulutaş
- Üzümbağı
- Yağlı
- Yaylacık
- Yedigöl
- Yedigöze
- Yeşiltepe
- Yeşilyurt
- Yıldıztepe
- Yukarı
- Yukarıfındıklı
- Yukarıözbağ
- Yunusköy
- Zeyrek

== Karaçoban ==
Karaçoban

- Akkavak
- Bağlar
- Bahçeli
- Binpınar
- Bozyer
- Budaklı
- Burnaz
- Çatalgül
- Dedeören
- Doğanbey
- Duman
- Erenler
- Erhanlar
- Gündüzköy
- Hacılar
- Karagöz
- Karaköprü
- Karmış
- Kavaklı
- Kırımkaya
- Kopal
- Kuşluca
- Marufköy
- Molladavut
- Ovayoncalı
- Sarıveli
- Seyhan

== Karayazı ==
Karayazı

- Abdurrahmanköy
- Ağaçlı
- Akarsu
- Akpınar
- Alemdağı
- Aliküllek
- Anıtlı
- Aşağıincesu
- Aşağısöylemez
- Aydınsu
- Bayraktar
- Bezirhane
- Çakmaközü
- Çalışkan
- Çaltılı
- Çatalören
- Çavuşköy
- Çayırbeyli
- Çelikli
- Çepi
- Değirmenkaya
- Dörtpınar
- Doruca
- Dündarköy
- Duruca
- Elmaağaç
- Geventepe
- Göksu
- Göktepe
- Güllü
- Hacıbayram
- Hasanova
- Kapanlı
- Karaağıl
- Karabey
- Karakale
- Karakaya
- Karasu
- Karşıyaka
- Kayalar
- Kazbel
- Kırgındere
- Kırıkpınar
- Kösehasan
- Köyceğiz
- Kurupınar
- Mollabekir
- Mollaosman
- Muratlı
- Payveren
- Şakirköy
- Salyamaç
- Sancaktar
- Sarıçiçek
- Selenli
- Sukonak
- Sulutaş
- Taşan
- Tosunlu
- Turnagöl
- Uğurdalı
- Ulucanlar
- Üzengili
- Yahyaköy
- Yalındal
- Yeni
- Yeniköy
- Yeşilova
- Yeşilyurt
- Yiğityolu
- Yolgören
- Yücelik
- Yukarıçığılgan
- Yukarıcihanbey
- Yukarısöylemez

== Köprüköy ==
Köprüköy

- Ağcaşar
- Akçam
- Alaca
- Aşağıçakmak
- Aşağıkızılkale
- Ataköy
- Buğdaylı
- Camikebir
- Çullu
- Derebaşı
- Dilek
- Duatepe
- Dumankaya
- Eğirmez
- Emre
- Eyüpler
- Geyikli
- Gölçayır
- Güzelhisar
- Ilıcasu
- Karataşlar
- Kayabaşı
- Kıyıkonak
- Marifet
- Mescitli
- Örentaş
- Ortaklar
- Pekecik
- Sarıtaş
- Savatlı
- Şehitler
- Soğuksu
- Topçu
- Yağan
- Yapağılı
- Yemlik
- Yeşilöz
- Yılanlı
- Yukarıkızılca
- Yukarıkızılkale
- Yukarısöğütlü
- Ziyaret

== Narman ==
Narman

- Alabalık
- Alacayar
- Araköy
- Aşağıyayla
- Başkale
- Beyler
- Boğakale
- Camikebir
- Camisağır
- Çamlıyayla
- Çimenli
- Dağyolu
- Demirdağ
- Ergazi
- Gökdağ
- Göllü
- Güllüdağ
- Güvenlik
- Kamışözü
- Karadağ
- Karapınar
- Kilimli
- Kışlaköy
- Koçkaya
- Koyunören
- Kuruçalı
- Mahmutçavuş
- Mercimekli
- Otlutepe
- Pınaryolu
- Samikale
- Sapanlı
- Savaşçılar
- Şehitler
- Şekerli
- Serinsu
- Seyyid Ali Baba
- Sülüklü
- Sütpınar
- Taşburun
- Telli
- Toygarlı
- Tuzla
- Yanıktaş
- Yoldere
- Yukarıyayla

== Oltu ==
Oltu

- Alatarla
- Arıtaş
- Aşağıçamlı
- Aşağıkumlu
- Aslanpaşa
- Ayvalı
- Ayyıldız
- Bahçecik
- Bahçelikışla
- Ballıca
- Başaklı
- Başbağlar
- Çamlıbel
- Çanakpınar
- Çatak
- Çatalsöğüt
- Çayüstü
- Çengelli
- Cumhuriyet
- Dağdibi
- Damarlıtaş
- Demirtaş
- Derebaşı
- Dokuzdeğirmen
- Duralar
- Elmadüzü
- Erdoğmuş
- Esenyamaç
- Gökçedere
- Günlüce
- Güryaprak
- Güzelsu
- Halitpaşa
- İğdeli
- İnanmış
- İnciköy
- İpekçayırı
- İriağaç
- Kaleboğazı
- Karabekir
- Karataş
- Kayaaltı
- Kemerkaya
- Konukseven
- Küçükorucuk
- Nüğürcük
- Obayayla
- Orucuk
- Özdere
- Sağlıcak
- Sarısaz
- Şehitler
- Şendurak
- Subatuk
- Süleymanlı
- Sülünkaya
- Tekeli
- Toklu
- Topkaynak
- Toprakkale
- Tutlu
- Tutmaç
- Tuzlaköy
- Ünlükaya
- Vişneli
- Yarbaşı
- Yasin Haşimoğlu
- Yaylaçayır
- Yolboyu
- Yukarıçamlı
- Yukarıkumlu
- Yusuf Ziyabey

== Olur ==
Olur

- Akbayır
- Aktepe
- Altunkaya
- Aşağıçayırlı
- Aşağıkaracasu
- Atlı
- Begendik
- Beşkaya
- Boğazgören
- Bozdoğan
- Çataksu
- Coşkunlar
- Eğlek
- Ekinlik
- Filizli
- Güngöründü
- Hükkam
- Ilıkaynak
- Kaban
- Kaledibi
- Karakoçlar
- Keçili
- Kekikli
- Köprübaşı
- Merkez
- Oğuzkent
- Olgun
- Olurdere
- Ormanağzı
- Şalpazarı
- Sarıbaşak
- Soğukgöze
- Süngübayır
- Taşgeçit
- Ürünlü
- Uzunharman
- Yaylabaşı
- Yeşilbağlar
- Yıldızkaya
- Yolgözler
- Yukarıçayırlı
- Yukarıkaracasu

== Palandöken ==
Palandöken

- A.Menderes
- Abdurrahman Gazi
- Alibezirgan
- Aziziye
- Börekli
- Çeperli
- Dereboğazı
- Güllüköy
- Güzelyurt
- Hancığaz
- Hüseyin Avni Ulaş
- Konaklı
- Kümbet
- Müftü Solakzade
- Nenehatun
- Şehitler
- Sığırlı
- Taşlıgüney
- Tekkederesi
- Tepeköy
- Toparlak
- Uzunahmet
- Yağmurcuk
- Yıkılhan
- Yukarıyenice
- Yunus Emre

== Pasinler ==
Pasinler

- Acı
- Ağaçminare
- Ağcalar
- Altınbaşak
- Alvar
- Ardıçlı
- Aşıtlar
- Bahçelievler
- Baldızı
- Başören
- Bulkasım
- Büyükdere
- Büyüktuy
- Çakırtaş
- Çalıyazı
- Camiikebir
- Çamlıca
- Çiçekli
- Çöğender
- Demirdöven
- Emirşeyh
- Epsemce
- Erzurumkapı
- Esendere
- Gerdekkaya
- Gölciğez
- Hanahmet
- Hasandede
- Kaplıcalar
- Karakale
- Karavelet
- Kasımpaşa
- Kavuşturan
- Kethuda
- Kevenlik
- Kızılören
- Kotandüzü
- Küçüktuy
- Kurbançayırı
- Kurtuluş
- Otlukkapı
- Ovaköy
- Övenler
- Paşabey
- Pelitli
- Porsuk
- Pusudere
- Reşadiye
- Saksı
- Şehit Burak Karakoç
- Serçeboğazı
- Sivas
- Sunak
- Taşağıl
- Taşkaynak
- Taşlıgüney
- Taşlıyurt
- Tepecik
- Timar
- Üğümü
- Uzunark
- Yamaç
- Yastıktepe
- Yavuzlu
- Yayla
- Yayladağ
- Yeni
- Yeniköy
- Yiğitpınarı
- Yiğittaşı
- Yukarıçakmak
- Yukarıdanişment

== Pazaryolu ==
Pazaryolu

- 21 Haziran
- Akbulut
- Alıçlı
- Ambaralan
- Ayçukuru
- Bayındır
- Burçaklı
- Büyükdere
- Çatakbahçe
- Çaydere
- Cenetpınarı
- Cevizlidere
- Çiftepınar
- Deliktaş
- Demirgöze
- Dikmetaş
- Esenyurt
- Gölyanı
- Göztepe
- Gülçimen
- Güneysu
- Hacılar
- Karakoç
- Karataş
- Kılıççı
- Konakyeri
- Korkutköy
- Köşeyolu
- Kozlu
- Kumaşkaya
- Kümbettepe
- Kuymaklı
- Laleli
- Merkez
- Meşebaşı
- Pamukludağ
- Sadaka
- Şehitlik
- Sergenkaya
- Süleymanbağı
- Yaylalı
- Yaylaözü
- Yeni
- Yiğitbaşı

== Şenkaya ==
Şenkaya

- Akşar
- Aktaş
- Alıcık
- Aşağı
- Aşağıbakraçlı
- Atyolu
- Aydoğdu
- Balkaya
- Bereketli
- Beşpınarlar
- Beykaynak
- Çamlıalan
- Çatalelma
- Değirmenlidere
- Deliktaş
- Doğanköy
- Dokuzelma
- Dolunay
- Dörtyol
- Esence
- Esenyurt
- Evbakan
- Gaziler
- Gezenek
- Göllet
- Göreşken
- Gözalan
- Gözebaşı
- Gülveren
- Hoşköy
- İçmesu
- İğdeli
- İkizpınar
- İnceçay
- Kayalısu
- Kaynak
- Kireçli
- Köroğlu
- Köşkköy
- Kürkçü
- Nişantaşı
- Ormanlı
- Oyuktaş
- Özyurt
- Paşalı
- Penek
- Sarıkayalar
- Sarıyar
- Şenpınar
- Sındıran
- Söğütler
- Susuz
- Tahtköy
- Tazeköy
- Teketaş
- Timurkışla
- Turnalı
- Tütenocak
- Uğurlu
- Yanıkkaval
- Yaymeşe
- Yazılı
- Yelkıran
- Yeşildemet
- Yeşilkaya
- Yoğurtçular
- Yukarı
- Yukarıbakraçlı
- Yünören
- Yürekli
- Zümrütköy

== Tekman ==
Tekman

- Ağcakoca
- Akdağ
- Akdamar
- Akpınar
- Alabayır
- Aşağıhanbeyi
- Aşağıtepecik
- Aydınlı
- Aydınlık
- Beşdere
- Beyköy
- Çağlar
- Çatak
- Çatkale
- Çayırdağı
- Çevirme
- Çiçekdağı
- Cihan
- Çukuryayla
- Dalsöğüt
- Deliler
- Dengiz
- Düzyurt
- Erence
- Geçitköy
- Gökoğlan
- Gözlüce
- Gülveren
- Gümüşlük
- Gündamı
- Güneşli
- Gürgür
- Güzeldere
- Hacıömer
- Hamzalar
- Hürriyet
- Hüseyinağa
- Ilıgöze
- İncesu
- Işıklar
- İsmetpaşa
- Kalaycı
- Karapınar
- Karataş
- Karatepe
- Karlıca
- Katranlı
- Kayaboğaz
- Kazancık
- Kırıkhan
- Koçyayla
- Körsu
- Küllü
- Kuruca
- Mescitli
- Mollamehmet
- Şakşak
- Susuz
- Taşkesen
- Toptepe
- Turnagöl
- Vatan
- Yalınca
- Yerköy
- Yeşilören
- Yiğitler
- Yoncalı
- Yücepınar
- Yukarıhanbeyi
- Yukarıtepecik
- Yuvaklı

== Tortum ==
Tortum

- Akbaba
- Aksu
- Aktaş
- Alapınar
- Alpaslan
- Arılı
- Aşağı Serdarlı
- Bağbaşı
- Bahçeli
- Ballı
- Çakıllı
- Çamlıca
- Çardaklı
- Çataldere
- Çaylıca
- Çiftlik
- Cihanlı
- Çivilikaya
- Demirciler
- Derekapı
- Derinpınar
- Dikmen
- Doruklu
- Esendurak
- Gökdere
- Hamidiye
- İncedere
- Kaleboynu
- Kaledibi
- Kapıkaya
- Karlı
- Kazandere
- Kemerkaya
- Kireçli
- Kırmalı
- Konak
- Meydanlar
- Pehlivanlı
- Peynirli
- Şenyurt
- Serdarlı
- Sögütlü
- Suyatağı
- Taşbaşı
- Taşoluk
- Tatlısu
- Tipili
- Tortumkale
- Uzunkavak
- Vişneli
- Yağcılar
- Yamankaya
- Yavuz Sultan Selim
- Yazyurdu
- Yellitepe
- Yukarı Sivri
- Yumaklı
- Ziyaretli

== Uzundere ==
Uzundere

- Altınçanak
- Balıklı
- Çağlayan
- Çamlıyamaç
- Çaybaşı
- Cevizli
- Cömertler
- Dikyar
- Erikli
- Gölbaşı
- Kirazlı
- Merkez
- Muratefendi
- Sapaca
- Seyitefendi
- Ulubağ
- Uzundere
- Yayla

== Yakutiye ==
Yakutiye

- Akdağ
- Aktoprak
- Altınbulak
- Altıntepe
- Arıbahçe
- Çayırca
- Çayırtepe
- Çiftlik
- Dadaşköy
- Değirmenler
- Dumlu
- Gökçeyamaç
- Gülpınar
- Güngörmez
- Güzelova
- Güzelyayla
- İbrahimhakkı
- Karagöbek
- Karasu
- Kazımkarabekirpaşa
- Kırkgöze
- Kırmızıtaş
- Köse Mehmet
- Köşkköy
- Kurtuluş
- Lala Paşa
- Mülk
- Muratgeldi
- Muratpaşa
- Ömer Nasuhi Bilmen
- Ortadüzü
- Rabia Ana
- Şenyurt
- Soğukçermik
- Söğütyanı
- Şükrüpaşa
- Umudum
- Üniversite
- Uzunyayla
- Yazıpınar
- Yerlisu
- Yeşildere
- Yeşilova
- Yeşilyayla
