= Yaylacık =

Yaylacık (literally "little highland") is a Turkish place name that may refer to the following places in Turkey:

- Yaylacık, Amasya, a village in the district of Amasya, Amasya Province
- Yaylacık, Ardahan, a village in the district of Ardahan, Ardahan Province
- Yaylacık, Ardanuç, a village in the district of Ardanuç, Artvin Province
- Yaylacık, Burhaniye
- Yaylacık, Bayramiç
- Yaylacık, Çermik
- Yaylacık, Ezine
- Yaylacık, Gölbaşı, a village in the district of Gölbaşı, Adıyaman Province
- Yaylacık, Horasan
- Yaylacık, İspir
- Yaylacık, Mudanya
- Yaylacık, Nilüfer
- Yaylacık, Ortaköy
- Yaylacık, Sındırgı, a village
- Yaylacık, Tercan

== See also ==
- Yayla, the root word
