= Cibali =

Cibali may refer to:

- Cibali, Catania, a neighbourhood of Catania, Italy
  - Stadio Cibali, a sports stadium
- Cibali, İspir, a place in Erzurum Province, Turkey
- Cibali, Fatih, a neighbourhood of Fatih, Istanbul, Turkey

== See also ==
- Chibali (disambiguation), entities in Kashmir
- Cibalia, a Croatian football club
