= Bostancı (disambiguation) =

Bostancı may refer to:

- Bostancı, a neighbourhood of Kadıköy district in Istanbul, Turkey
- Bostancı, Gönen, a village
- Bostancı, İspir
- Bostançı, a village and municipality in the Khachmaz Rayon of Azerbaijan
- Bostanji, one of the imperial guards of the Ottoman Empire
