= Mescitli =

Mescitli can refer to:

- Mescitli, İspir
- Mescitli, Köprüköy
- Mescitli, Nazilli
