= İncesu =

İncesu may refer to:

== Places ==
- İncesu, Aksaray, a village in Aksaray Province, Turkey
- İncesu, Horasan
- İncesu, Kayseri, a town in Kayseri Province, Turkey
- İncesu, İspir
- İncesu, Ortaköy
- İncesu, Osmancık
- İncesu, Silvan
- İncesu, Taşköprü, a village in Turkey
- İncesu, Atakum, a village in Samsun Province, Turkey
- İncesu, Vezirköprü, a village in Samsun Province, Turkey

== People with the name ==
- Remzi Sedat İncesu (born 1972), Turkish basketball player
