= Ardıçlı =

Ardıçlı is a Turkic place name that may refer to the following places:

== Azerbaijan ==
- Ardıclı, a village in Lachin Rayon

== Turkey ==
- Ardıçlı, Gercüş, a village in the district of Gercüş, Batman Province
- Ardıçlı, İspir
- Ardıçlı, Murgul, a village in the district of Murgul, Artvin Province
- Ardıçlı, Pasinler
- Ardıçlı, Savaştepe, a village
- Ardıçlı, Tarsus, a village in the district of Tarsus, Mersin Province
- Ardıçlıtaş, a village in the district of Bozyazı, Mersin Province
