= Tepecik =

Tepecik may refer to:

== Places in Turkey ==
- Tepecik, Aydın
- Tepecik, Beşiri
- Tepecik, Bismil
- Tepecik, Eğil
- Tepecik, Gercüş
- Tepecik, İspir
- Tepecik, Karacasu
- Tepecik, Kocaköy
- Tepecik, Maden
- Tepecik, Manyas
- Tepecik, Mustafakemalpaşa, a populated place in Bursa Province
- Tepecik, Pasinler
- Tepecik, Tut
- Tepecik, an archaeological site submerged by the Keban Dam lake in Elazığ Province

== Other ==
- Tepecik B.S., Turkish sports club
