= Kirik =

Kirik or Kırık may refer to:

== Places in Turkey ==
- Kırık, Horasan, a neighbourhood in Erzurum Province
- Kırık, İspir, a neighbourhood in Erzurum Province
- Kırık, Kastamonu, a village in Kastamonu Province
- Kırık, Solhan, a village in Bingöl Province
- Kırık, Yığılca, a village in Düzce Province

== Other uses ==
- Kirik the Novgorodian (1110 – ca. 1156/1158), Russian monk and chronicler
- 3588 Kirik, a main-belt asteroid named after Kirik the Novgorodian
