= Gündoğdu =

Gündoğdu is a Turkish word and translates to:

== People ==
- Sami Süleyman Gündoğdu Demirel (19
- Gundogdu, son of Suleyman Shah (see Gündoğdu Bey and Sungurtekin Bey)

== Places ==
- Gündoğdu, Biga
- Gündoğdu, Dicle
- Gündoğdu, Gerger, a village in Adıyaman Province, Turkey
- Gündoğdu, İspir
- Gündoğdu, Manavgat, a village in Antalya Province, Turkey
- Gündoğdu, Mustafakemalpaşa
- Gündoğdu, Yenice
- Gündoğdu Square, a city square in İzmir, Turkey
