= Araköy =

Araköy can refer to:

- Araköy, İspir
- Araköy, Narman
