= Yıldıztepe =

Yıldıztepe can refer to:

- Yıldıztepe, Gümüşova
- Yıldıztepe, İspir
