= Zeyrek (disambiguation) =

Zeyrek can refer to:

- Zeyrek
- Zeyrek, İspir
- Zeyrek, Kulp
- Zeyrek Mosque
- Ferdi Zeyrek (1977–2025), Turkish architect and politician
