= Ortaören =

Ortaören can refer to:

- Ortaören, Bağlar
- Ortaören, İspir
- Ortaören, Silifke
