= Başçeşme =

Başçeşme can refer to:

- Başçeşme, Bigadiç
- Başçeşme, Bozkurt
- Başçeşme, İspir
