= Bahçeli =

Bahçeli (literally "(place) with gardens") is a Turkish place name and may refer to:

== Settlements ==
- Bahçeli, Alaca
- Bahçeli, Beşiri, a village in Batman Province, Turkey
- Bahçeli, Biga
- Bahçeli, Dikili, a village in Izmir Province, Turkey
- Bahçeli, Ezine
- Bahçeli, İspir
- Bahçeli, Keban
- Bahçeli, Niğde, a town in Niğde Province, Turkey
- Bahçeli, Yusufeli, a village in Artvin Province, Turkey
- The Turkish name of the village of Kalograia in Cyprus

== People ==
- Devlet Bahçeli (born 1948), a politician and a party chairman in Turkey
