= Akseki (disambiguation) =

Akseki is a town and district of Antalya Province, Turkey.

Akseki is a Turkish place name that may also refer to the following places in Turkey:

- Akseki, Antalya, a village in the district of Akseki, Antalya Province
- Akseki, Bayramören
- Akseki, Bozdoğan, a village in the district of Bozdoğan, Aydın Province
- Akseki, İspir
- Akseki, Sivrice, a village of Sivrice district in Elazığ Province
- Akseki, Taşköprü, a village
- Akseki, Tosya, a village
