= Cankurtaran =

Cankurtaran can refer to:

- Cankurtaran, İspir
- Cankurtaran Tunnel
- Cankurtaran railway station
- Cankurtaran, Fatih, Istanbul
