= Kirazlı =

Kirazlı can refer to the following villages in Turkey:

- Kirazlı, Akçakoca
- Kirazlı, Araç
- Kirazlı, Bandırma
- Kirazlı, Çanakkale
- Kirazlı, Düzce
- Kirazlı, İspir
- Kirazlı, Kuşadası
- Kirazlı, Şavşat

== See also ==
- Kirazlı (Istanbul Metro)
