= Demirbilek =

Demirbilek can refer to:

- Demirbilek, Batman
- Demirbilek, İspir
