= Tekpınar =

Tekpınar can refer to:

- Tekpınar, Adıyaman
- Tekpınar, İspir
- Tekpınar, Taşova
