= Çayırdüzü =

Çayırdüzü can refer to:

- Çayırdüzü, Horasan
- Çayırdüzü, Tercan
