= Taşbaşı =

Taşbaşı can refer to:

- Taşbaşı, Alanya
- Taşbaşı, İspir
