= Çayırbaşı =

Çayırbaşı can refer to:

- Çayırbaşı, Bitlis, a village
- Çayırbaşı, Göle, a village
- Çayırbaşı, İspir
- Çayırbaşı Stadium
