= Gölyurt =

Gölyurt can refer to:

- Gölyurt, Gerger
- Gölyurt, İspir
