= Bahçe =

Bahçe (literally "garden") is a Turkish place name that may refer to the following places in Turkey:

- Bahçe, Bismil
- Bahçe, Horasan
- Bahçe, Osmaniye, a rural district and town of Osmaniye Province
- Bahçe, Karataş, a village in the district of Karataş, Adana Province
- Bahçe, Silifke, a village in the district of Silifke, Mersin Province
- Bahçe, Silvan
