= Bademli =

Bademli is a Turkish word, meaning "with almonds" or "place of almonds," and may refer to several places in Turkey:

- Bademli, Acıpayam
- Bademli, Ağın
- Bademli, Akseki, a village in the district of Akseki, Antalya Province
- Bademli, Aydın, a village in the district of Aydın, Aydın Province
- Bademli, Ayvacık
- Bademli, Bigadiç, a village
- Bademli, Bismil
- Bademli, Dicle
- Bademli, Dikili, a village in the district of Dekili, İzmir Province
- Bademli, Dinar, a village in the district of Dinar, Afyonkarahisar Province
- Bademli, Emirdağ, a village in the district of Emirdağ, Afyonkarahisar Province
- Bademli, Ergani
- Bademli, Gökçeada
- Bademli, Gümüşhacıköy, a village in the district of Gümüşhacıköy, Amasya Province
- Bademli, İspir
- Bademli, Karamanlı
- Bademli, Keban
- Bademli, Kızılcahamam, a village in the district of Kızılcahamam, Ankara Province
- Bademli, Ödemiş, a village in Ödemiş district of İzmir Province
- Bademli, Şuhut, a village in the district of Şuhut, Afyonkarahisar Province

== See also ==
- Bademli Dam, a dam in Burdur Province
- Bademlik, Çermik, Turkey
