= Hacıahmet =

Hacıahmet can refer to:

- Hacıahmet, Horasan
- Hacıahmet, Mustafakemalpaşa
