= Çatakkaya =

Çatakkaya can refer to:

- Çatakkaya, İspir
- Çatakkaya, Sivrice
