= Öztoprak =

Öztoprak is a Turkish surname. Notable people with the surname include:

- Canan Öztoprak (born 1955), Turkish Cypriot politician
- Hüseyin Öztoprak, Turkish Cypriot politician

== See also ==
- Öztoprak, İspir
