= Duruköy =

Duruköy can refer to:

- Duruköy, İspir
- Duruköy, Lice
