= Akçataş =

Akçataş (literally "quite white rock") is a Turkish place name that may refer to the following places in Turkey:

- Akçataş, Horasan
- Akçataş, Kalecik, a village in the district of Kalecik, Ankara Province
- Akçataş, Kargı
- Akçataş, Kastamonu, a village in the district of Kastamonu, Kastamonu Province
