= Yukarıfındıklı =

Yukarıfındıklı can refer to:

- Yukarıfındıklı, Boğazkale
- Yukarıfındıklı, İspir
