= Köprüköy (disambiguation) =

Köprüköy can refer to the following places in Turkey:

- Köprüköy
- Köprüköy, Bismil
- Köprüköy, İspir
- Köprüköy, Keskin, a village in Kırıkkale Province
