= Ağıllı =

Ağıllı can refer to:

- Ağıllı, Bismil
- Ağıllı, Çıldır
- Ağıllı, Horasan
- Ağıllı, Kulp
- Ağıllı is a village in Acıgöl, formerly Dobada/Topada, which is a district of Nevşehir Province in the Central Anatolia region of Turkey.
