= Petekli =

Petekli can refer to:

- Petekli, Demirözü
- Petekli, İspir
