= Tavşancık =

Tavşancık can refer to the following villages in Turkey:

- Tavşancık, Horasan
- Tavşancık, Kalecik
- Tavşancık, Savaştepe
