= Yedigöze =

Yedigöze can refer to:

- Yedigöze Dam
- Yedigöze, Bayburt
- Yedigöze, Elâzığ
- Yedigöze, İspir
