= Çayırözü =

Çayırözü can refer to:

- Çayırözü, Bayburt
- Çayırözü, Gündoğmuş
- Çayırözü, İspir
- Çayırözü, Merzifon
