= Muratbağı =

Muratbağı can refer:

- Muratbağı, Kovancılar
- Muratbağı, Horasan
