= Düzköy (disambiguation) =

Düzköy can refer to:

- Düzköy
- Düzköy, Borçka
- Düzköy, Düzce
- Düzköy, İspir
- Düzköy, Mengen
- Düzköy, Ulus
