= Bulgurlu =

Bulgurlu can refer to:

- Bulgurlu, Horasan
- Bulgurlu, Üsküdar
- Bulgurlu—Libadiye (Istanbul Metro)
