= Aşağıfındıklı =

Aşağıfındıklı can refer to:

- Aşağıfındıklı, İspir
- Aşağıfındıklı, Sungurlu
