= 1983 Erzurum earthquake =

Earthquake in eastern Turkey

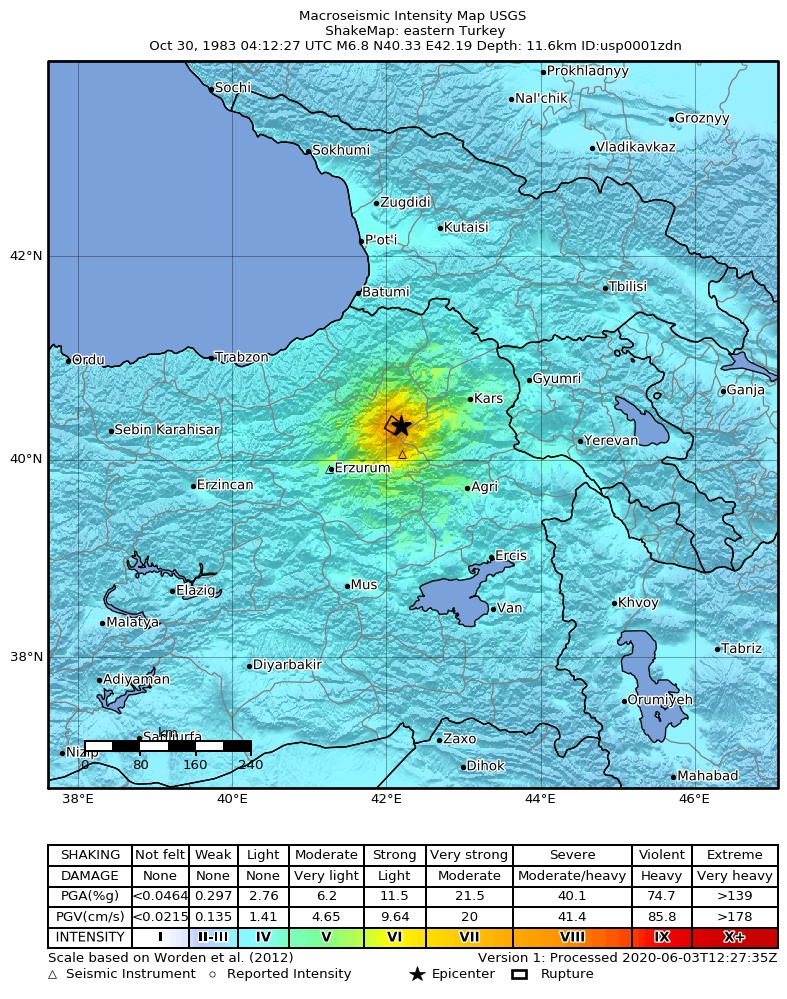
- USGS ShakeMap

- Location within Turkey
- UTC time: 1983-10-30 04:12:30
- ISC event: 567451
- USGS-ANSS: ComCat
- Local date: 30 October 1983
- Local time: 07:12:30
- Magnitude: 6.6 M_{w}
- Depth: 15 km (9.3 mi)
- Epicenter: 40.35°N 42.1879°E
- Type: Oblique-slip
- Areas affected: Turkey
- Max. intensity: MMI IX (Violent)
- Landslides: Yes
- Casualties: 1,342 dead

The 1983 Erzurum earthquake occurred in northeastern Turkey on 30 October 1983 at 07:12 local time (04:12 UTC). It had a moment magnitude of 6.6 and a maximum Mercalli intensity of IX (Violent). Reuters reports that about 1,340 people have died and 50 settlements in the provinces of Erzurum and Kars have been demolished by the earthquake.

== Earthquake ==
The mainshock was associated with predominantly strike-slip faulting on a vertical-dipping fault plane. The geological area where the earthquake occurred is characterized by many faults trending northeast and east–northeast. The predominant rock types are volcanics which lie on top of severely deformed ophiolites. Its epicenter is located within the Gullu and Allahuekber Mountains which represents a Quaternary shear zone with left-lateral faults marking the boundary. Seismicity is also associated with the Abul Samsar Fracture Zone; a northeast–southwest trending feature of the Caucasus Mountains. A 15 km (9.3 mi) surface rupture trending north–northeast was observed, exhibiting left-lateral and normal slip. Graben-type ground fractures also occurred due to extensional mechanism. The surface rupture length was not consistent with those expected for the earthquake's magnitude.

== Damage ==
Well-constructed stone, concrete block and masonry infrastructures such as schools, mosques and medical facilities had less damage compared to others in the affected villages. Some remained intact even in the meizoseismal area. The maximum assigned MSK 64 intensity based on damage was VIII.

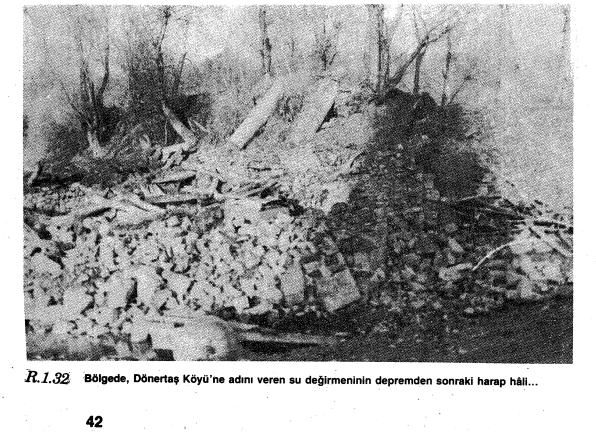
Broken mill in 1984 after the 1983 earthquake in Dönertaş, Horason, Erzurum province

Severe damage occurred in the villages of Horasan, Pasinler and Narman municipalities, Erzurum Province. Villages in Sarikamis, Kars Province were also affected. Total destruction was observed in an elliptical area with axes 10 km (6.2 mi) (major) and 5 km (3.1 mi) (minor), respectively. The major axis trends northeast. About 80 percent of the at least 1,330 fatalities occurred in this area; 1,332 people were injured. Ten thousand homes were damaged; 3,200 collapsed. An estimated 26,000 livestock were killed.
