= Hacıəbdürəhimoba =

Village in Khachmaz, Azerbaijan

- Location within Azerbaijan
- Coordinates: 41°36′16″N 48°46′28″E
- Country: Azerbaijan
- Rayon: Khachmaz
- Municipality: Bostançı
- Time zone: UTC+4 (AZT)
  - Summer (DST): UTC+5 (AZT)

Hacıəbdürəhimoba (also, Hacıəbdürrəhimoba, Hacıədbürəhimoba, Gadzhabduragimoba, and Gadzhyabduragimoba) is a village in the Khachmaz Rayon of Azerbaijan. The village forms part of the municipality of Bostançı.
