= Yukarıbademözü, Horasan =

Village in Turkey

Yukarıbademözü
- Neighbourhood
- Location in Turkey
- Coordinates: 40°09′31″N 42°10′32″E
- Country: Turkey
- Province: Erzurum
- District: Horasan
- Population (2022): 169
- Time zone: UTC+3 (TRT)

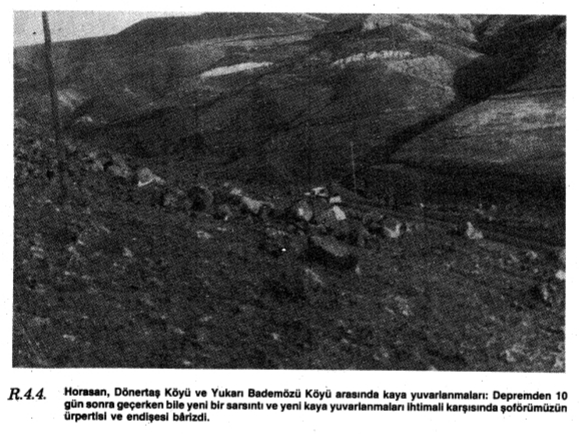
Rockfalls between Horasan, Dönertaş Village and Yukarı Bademözü Village: Even 10 days after the earthquake, our driver's fear and anxiety were evident at the possibility of a new tremor and new rockfalls.

Yukarıbademözü is a neighbourhood in the municipality and district of Horasan, Erzurum Province in Turkey. Its population is 169 (2022).
