= Sibiroba =

Human settlement in Azerbaijan

- Village
- Location within Azerbaijan
- Country: Azerbaijan
- District: Khachmaz Rayon
- Time zone: UTC+4 (AZT)

Sibiroba is a village in the municipality of Bostançı in the Khachmaz Rayon of Azerbaijan.
