= Göçköy, İspir =

Village in Turkey

Göçköy
- Neighbourhood
- Location in Turkey
- Coordinates: 40°33′36″N 41°10′09″E
- Country: Turkey
- Province: Erzurum
- District: İspir
- Population (2022): 52
- Time zone: UTC+3 (TRT)

Göçköy is a neighbourhood in the municipality and district of İspir, Erzurum Province in Turkey. Its population is 52 (2022).
