= Hızardere, Horasan =

Village in Turkey

Hızardere
- Neighbourhood
- Location in Turkey
- Coordinates: 40°07′14″N 41°56′13″E
- Country: Turkey
- Province: Erzurum
- District: Horasan
- Population (2022): 43
- Time zone: UTC+3 (TRT)

Hızardere is a neighbourhood in the municipality and district of Horasan, Erzurum Province in Turkey. Its population is 43 (2022).
