= Saçlık, Horasan =

Village in Turkey

Saçlık
- Neighbourhood
- Location in Turkey
- Coordinates: 39°51′57″N 42°11′21″E
- Country: Turkey
- Province: Erzurum
- District: Horasan
- Population (2022): 176
- Time zone: UTC+3 (TRT)

Saçlık is a neighbourhood in the municipality and district of Horasan, Erzurum Province in Turkey. Its population is 176 (2022).
