= Arpaçayır, Horasan =

Village in Turkey

Arpaçayır
- Neighbourhood
- Location in Turkey
- Coordinates: 40°01′09″N 42°25′47″E
- Country: Turkey
- Province: Erzurum
- District: Horasan
- Population (2022): 382
- Time zone: UTC+3 (TRT)

Arpaçayır is a neighbourhood in the municipality and district of Horasan, Erzurum Province in Turkey. Its population is 382 (2022).
