= Alacabük, İspir =

Village in Turkey

Alacabük
- Neighbourhood
- Location in Turkey
- Coordinates: 40.3375°N 40.9824°E
- Country: Turkey
- Province: Erzurum
- District: İspir
- Population (2022): 106
- Time zone: UTC+3 (TRT)

Alacabük (Armenian: Կոշմաշատ, romanized: Košmašat) is a neighbourhood in the municipality and district of İspir, Erzurum Province in Turkey. Its population is 106 (2022).
