= Karaseydi, İspir =

Village in Turkey

Karaseydi
- Neighbourhood
- Location in Turkey
- Coordinates: 40°16′28″N 40°41′53″E
- Country: Turkey
- Province: Erzurum
- District: İspir
- Population (2022): 39
- Time zone: UTC+3 (TRT)

Karaseydi is a neighbourhood in the municipality and district of İspir, Erzurum Province in Turkey. Its population is 39 (2022).
