= Güney, İspir =

Village in Turkey

Güney
- Neighbourhood
- Country: Turkey
- Province: Erzurum
- District: İspir
- Population (2022): 84
- Time zone: UTC+3 (TRT)

Güney is a neighbourhood in the municipality and district of İspir, Erzurum Province in Turkey. Its population is 84 (2022).
