= Azap, Horasan =

Village in Turkey

Azap
- Neighbourhood
- Location in Turkey
- Coordinates: 40°04′12″N 42°05′27″E
- Country: Turkey
- Province: Erzurum
- District: Horasan
- Population (2022): 252
- Time zone: UTC+3 (TRT)

Azap (also: Azapköy) is a neighbourhood in the municipality and district of Horasan, Erzurum Province in Turkey. Its population is 252 (2022).
