= Yukarıtahirhoca, Horasan =

Village in Turkey

Yukarıtahirhoca
- Neighbourhood
- Location in Turkey
- Coordinates: 40°00′07″N 42°12′57″E
- Country: Turkey
- Province: Erzurum
- District: Horasan
- Population (2022): 122
- Time zone: UTC+3 (TRT)

Yukarıtahirhoca is a neighbourhood in the municipality and district of Horasan, Erzurum Province in Turkey. Its population is 122 (2022).
