= İğdeli, Horasan =

Village in Turkey

İğdeli
- Neighbourhood
- Country: Turkey
- Province: Erzurum
- District: Horasan
- Population (2022): 192
- Time zone: UTC+3 (TRT)

İğdeli is a neighbourhood in the municipality and district of Horasan, Erzurum Province in Turkey. Its population is 192 (2022).

== History ==
The neighborhood had the same name since 1914. In Erzurum, which became a metropolitan municipality in 1993, the legal personality of all villages was abolished with Law No. 6360 in 2012. This village also became a neighborhood of the Horasan District.

== Geography ==
The neighborhood is 115 km away from Erzurum city center and 25 km away from Horasan district center.
