= Kadıcelal, Horasan =

Village in Turkey

Kadıcelal
- Neighbourhood
- Location in Turkey
- Coordinates: 39°53′N 42°06′E
- Country: Turkey
- Province: Erzurum
- District: Horasan
- Population (2022): 268
- Time zone: UTC+3 (TRT)

Kadıcelal is a neighbourhood in the municipality and district of Horasan, Erzurum Province in Turkey. Its population is 268 (2022).
