= Devedağı, İspir =

Village in Turkey

Devedağı
- Neighbourhood
- Location in Turkey
- Coordinates: 40°34′N 41°16′E
- Country: Turkey
- Province: Erzurum
- District: İspir
- Population (2022): 68
- Time zone: UTC+3 (TRT)

Devedağı is a neighbourhood in the municipality and district of İspir, Erzurum Province in Turkey. Its population is 68 (2022).
