= Harçlı, Horasan =

Village in Turkey

Harçlı
- Neighbourhood
- Location in Turkey
- Coordinates: 39°55′N 42°03′E
- Country: Turkey
- Province: Erzurum
- District: Horasan
- Population (2022): 166
- Time zone: UTC+3 (TRT)

Harçlı is a neighbourhood in the municipality and district of Horasan, Erzurum Province in Turkey. Its population is 166 (2022).
