= Kırkgözeler, Horasan =

Village in Turkey

Kırkgözeler
- Neighbourhood
- Location in Turkey
- Coordinates: 40°00′N 42°02′E
- Country: Turkey
- Province: Erzurum
- District: Horasan
- Population (2022): 927
- Time zone: UTC+3 (TRT)

Kırkgözeler is a neighbourhood in the municipality and district of Horasan, Erzurum Province in Turkey. Its population is 927 (2022).
