= Dönertaş, Horasan =

Village in Turkey

Dönertaş
- Neighbourhood
- Country: Turkey
- Province: Erzurum
- District: Horasan
- Population (2022): 130
- Time zone: UTC+3 (TRT)

Dönertaş is a neighbourhood in the municipality and district of Horasan, Erzurum Province in Turkey. Its population is 130 (2022).

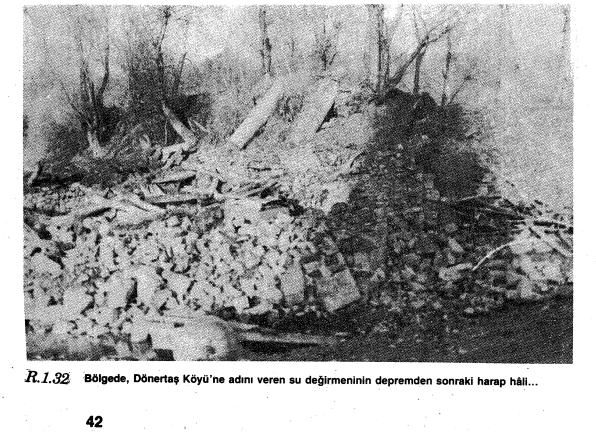
Broken mill in 1984 after the 1983 Erzurum earthquake in Dönertaş
