= Başköy, İspir =

Village in Turkey

Başköy
- Neighbourhood
- Location in Turkey
- Coordinates: 40.605°N 40.987°E
- Country: Turkey
- Province: Erzurum
- District: İspir
- Population (2022): 273
- Time zone: UTC+3 (TRT)

Başköy is a neighbourhood in the municipality and district of İspir, Erzurum Province in Turkey. Its population is 273 (2022).
