= Yürükatlı, Horasan =

Village in Turkey

Yürükatlı
- Neighbourhood
- Location in Turkey
- Coordinates: 40°05′N 42°00′E
- Country: Turkey
- Province: Erzurum
- District: Horasan
- Population (2022): 304
- Time zone: UTC+3 (TRT)

Yürükatlı is a neighbourhood in the municipality and district of Horasan, Erzurum Province in Turkey. Its population is 304 (2022).
