= Ardı, Horasan =

Village in Turkey

Ardı
- Neighbourhood
- Location in Turkey
- Coordinates: 39°57′N 42°07′E
- Country: Turkey
- Province: Erzurum
- District: Horasan
- Population (2022): 144
- Time zone: UTC+3 (TRT)

Ardı is a neighbourhood in the municipality and district of Horasan, Erzurum Province in Turkey. Its population is 144 (2022).
