= Yedigöl, İspir =

Village in Turkey

Yedigöl
- Neighbourhood
- Location in Turkey
- Coordinates: 40°39′49″N 40°58′52″E
- Country: Turkey
- Province: Erzurum
- District: İspir
- Population (2022): 199
- Time zone: UTC+3 (TRT)

Yedigöl is a neighbourhood in the municipality and district of İspir, Erzurum Province in Turkey. Its population is 199 (2022).
