= Aşağıaktaş, Horasan =

Village in Turkey

Aşağıaktaş
- Neighbourhood
- Location within Turkey
- Coordinates: 39.8833°N 42.3433°E
- Country: Turkey
- Province: Erzurum
- District: Horasan
- Population (2022): 242
- Time zone: UTC+3 (TRT)

Aşağıaktaş is a neighbourhood in the municipality and district of Horasan, Erzurum Province in Turkey. Its population is 242 (2022). The village is populated by Kurds from the Şadili tribe.
