= Kızılhasan, İspir =

Village in Turkey

Kızılhasan
- Neighbourhood
- Country: Turkey
- Province: Erzurum
- District: İspir
- Population (2022): 68
- Time zone: UTC+3 (TRT)

Kızılhasan is a neighbourhood in the municipality and district of İspir, Erzurum Province in Turkey. Its population is 68 (2022).
