= Kırkdikme, Horasan =

Village in Turkey

Kırkdikme
- Neighbourhood
- Location in Turkey
- Coordinates: 40°03′N 41°59′E
- Country: Turkey
- Province: Erzurum
- District: Horasan
- Population (2022): 169
- Time zone: UTC+3 (TRT)

Kırkdikme is a neighbourhood in the municipality and district of Horasan, Erzurum Province in Turkey. Its population is 169 (2022).
