= Yüzören, Horasan =

Village in Turkey

Yüzören
- Neighbourhood
- Location in Turkey
- Coordinates: 39°59′14″N 42°06′13″E
- Country: Turkey
- Province: Erzurum
- District: Horasan
- Population (2022): 283
- Time zone: UTC+3 (TRT)

Yüzören is a neighbourhood in the municipality and district of Horasan, Erzurum Province in Turkey. Its population is 283 (2022).
