= Akpınar, İspir =

Village in Turkey

Akpınar
- Neighbourhood
- Location in Turkey
- Coordinates: 40.3513°N 40.9898°E
- Country: Turkey
- Province: Erzurum
- District: İspir
- Population (2022): 12
- Time zone: UTC+3 (TRT)

Akpınar is a neighbourhood in the municipality and district of İspir, Erzurum Province in Turkey. Its population is 12 (2022).
