= Hızırilyas, Horasan =

Village in Turkey

Hızırilyas
- Neighbourhood
- Location in Turkey
- Coordinates: 40°08′09″N 42°13′42″E
- Country: Turkey
- Province: Erzurum
- District: Horasan
- Population (2022): 274
- Time zone: UTC+3 (TRT)

Hızırilyas is a neighbourhood in the municipality and district of Horasan, Erzurum Province in Turkey. Its population is 274 (2022).
