= Değirmendere, İspir =

Village in Turkey

Değirmendere
- Neighbourhood
- Location in Turkey
- Coordinates: 40°16′27″N 40°47′17″E
- Country: Turkey
- Province: Erzurum
- District: İspir
- Population (2022): 67
- Time zone: UTC+3 (TRT)

Değirmendere is a neighbourhood in the municipality and district of İspir, Erzurum Province in Turkey. Its population is 67 (2022).
