= Yeşilyurt, İspir =

Village in Turkey

Yeşilyurt
- Neighbourhood
- Location in Turkey
- Coordinates: 40°33′15″N 41°2′27″E
- Country: Turkey
- Province: Erzurum
- District: İspir
- Population (2022): 168
- Time zone: UTC+3 (TRT)

Yeşilyurt is a neighbourhood in the municipality and district of İspir, Erzurum Province in Turkey. Its population is 168 (2022).
