= Gerek, Horasan =

Village in Turkey

Gerek
- Neighbourhood
- Location within Turkey
- Country: Turkey
- Province: Erzurum
- District: Horasan
- Population (2022): 230
- Time zone: UTC+3 (TRT)

Gerek is a neighbourhood in the municipality and district of Horasan, Erzurum Province in Turkey. Its population is 230 as of the year 2022. Prior to the Russo-Turkish War (1828-1829), the village was populated by Greek and Armenian Christians. They resettled in the Tsalka region in modern day Georgia.
