= Ulubel, İspir =

Village in Turkey

Ulubel
- Neighbourhood
- Location in Turkey
- Coordinates: 40°25′28″N 40°52′34″E
- Country: Turkey
- Province: Erzurum
- District: İspir
- Population (2022): 73
- Time zone: UTC+3 (TRT)

Ulubel is a neighbourhood in the municipality and district of İspir, Erzurum Province in Turkey. Its population is 73 (2022). Geographical coordinates (latitude and longitude): 40.42444, 40.875861.
