= Üzümbağı, İspir =

Village in Turkey

Üzümbağı
- Neighbourhood
- Location in Turkey
- Coordinates: 40°43′13″N 41°20′27″E
- Country: Turkey
- Province: Erzurum
- District: İspir
- Population (2022): 191
- Time zone: UTC+3 (TRT)

Üzümbağı is a neighbourhood in the municipality and district of İspir, Erzurum Province in Turkey. Its population is 191 (2022).
