= Chibhali =

Chibhali or Chibali may refer to:

- inhabitants of the former princely state of Chibhal in Kashmir
- Chibhali dialect, spoken in the region
