= Kaynarca, Horasan =

Village in Turkey

Kaynarca
- Neighbourhood
- Country: Turkey
- Province: Erzurum
- District: Horasan
- Population (2022): 170
- Time zone: UTC+3 (TRT)

Kaynarca is a neighbourhood in the municipality and district of Horasan, Erzurum Province in Turkey. Its population is 170 (2022).
