= Moryayla, İspir =

Village in Turkey

Moryayla
- Neighbourhood
- Location in Turkey
- Coordinates: 40°36′05″N 40°55′57″E
- Country: Turkey
- Province: Erzurum
- District: İspir
- Population (2022): 38
- Time zone: UTC+3 (TRT)

Moryayla is a neighbourhood in the municipality and district of İspir, Erzurum Province in Turkey. Its population is 38 (2022).
