= Yukarıhorum, Horasan =

Village in Turkey

Yukarıhorum
- Neighbourhood
- Location in Turkey
- Coordinates: 40°12′N 42°11′E
- Country: Turkey
- Province: Erzurum
- District: Horasan
- Population (2022): 120
- Time zone: UTC+3 (TRT)

Yukarıhorum is a neighbourhood in the municipality and district of Horasan, Erzurum Province in Turkey. Its population is 120 (2022).
