= Başpınar, İspir =

Village in Turkey

Başpınar
- Neighbourhood
- Location in Turkey
- Coordinates: 40.4158°N 41.0292°E
- Country: Turkey
- Province: Erzurum
- District: İspir
- Population (2022): 53
- Time zone: UTC+3 (TRT)

Başpınar is a neighbourhood in the municipality and district of İspir, Erzurum Province in Turkey. Its population is 53 (2022).
