= Yağlı, İspir =

Village in Turkey

Yağlı
- Neighbourhood
- Country: Turkey
- Province: Erzurum
- District: İspir
- Population (2022): 62
- Time zone: UTC+3 (TRT)

Yağlı is a neighbourhood in the municipality and district of İspir, Erzurum Province in Turkey. Its population is 62 (2022).
