= Bostançı =

- Municipality
- Location within Azerbaijan
- Coordinates: 41°36′17″N 48°44′46″E
- Country: Azerbaijan
- Rayon: Khachmaz

Population
  - Total: 1,688
- Time zone: UTC+4 (AZT)
  - Summer (DST): UTC+5 (AZT)

Bostançı (also, Bostanchy) is a village and municipality in the Khachmaz Rayon of Azerbaijan. It has a population of 1,688. The municipality consists of the villages of Bostançı, Hacıəbdürəhimoba, and Sibiroba.
