= İspir =

- District and municipality
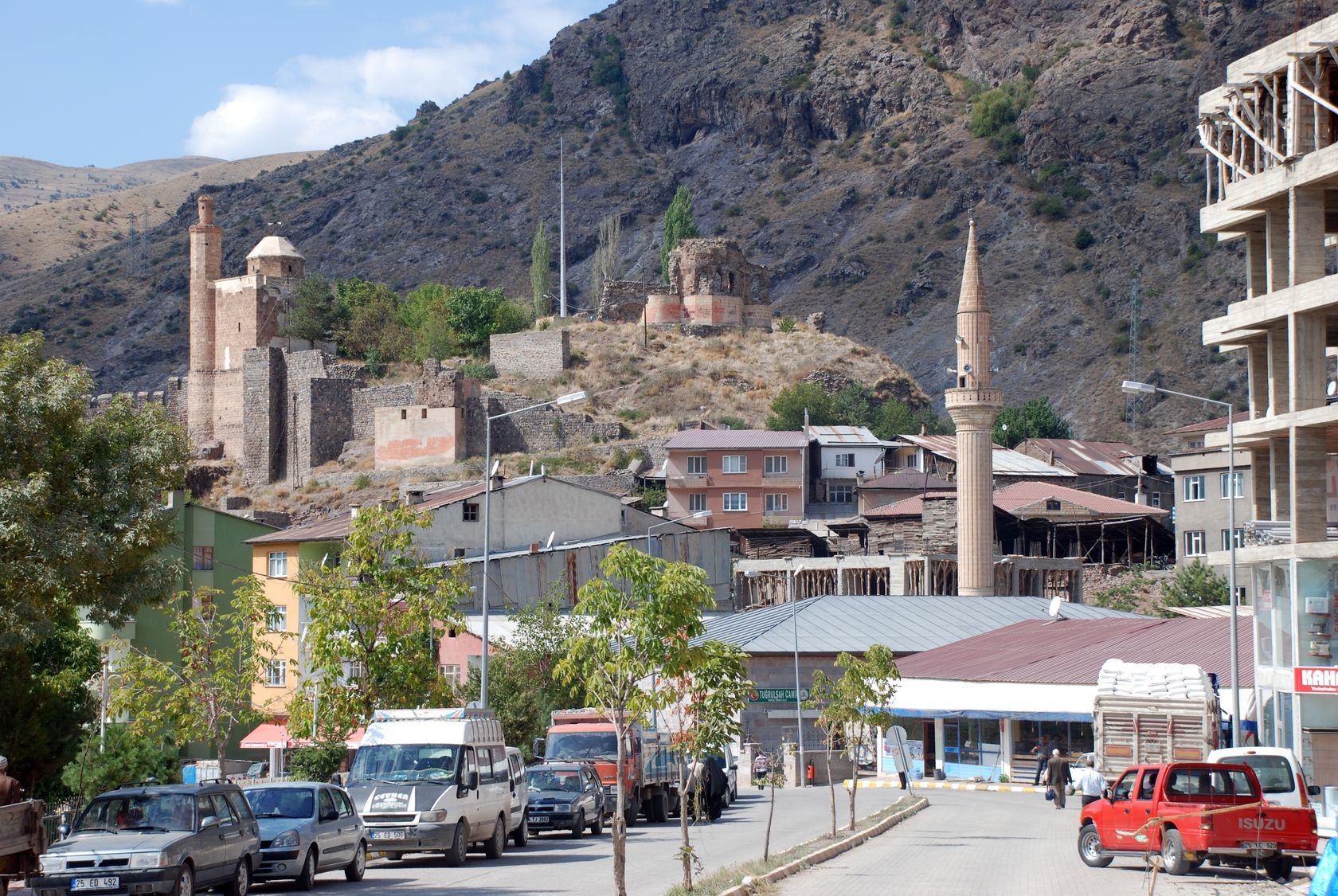
- İspir castle and the historic citadel mosque.

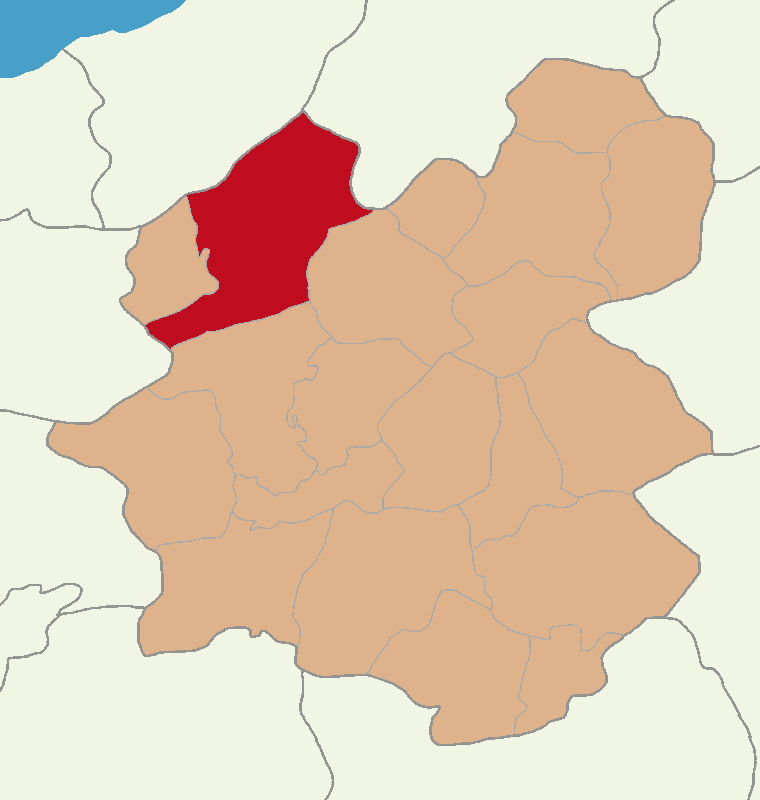
- Map showing İspir District in Erzurum Province

- Location within Turkey
- Coordinates: 40°29′01″N 40°59′43″E
- Country: Turkey
- Province: Erzurum

Government
  - Mayor: Ahmet Coşkun (MHP)
- Area: 2,129 km^{2} (822 sq mi)
- Population (2022): 14,607
  - Density: 6.861/km^{2} (17.77/sq mi)
- Time zone: UTC+3 (TRT)
- Postal code: 25900
- Area code: 0442
- Website: www.ispir.bel.tr

İspir (Armenian: Սպեր, romanized: Sper; Georgian: სპერი, romanized: sp'eri) is a municipality and district of Erzurum Province, Turkey. Its area is 2,129 km^{2}, and its population is 14,607 (2022). It is on the Çoruh River. The mayor is Ahmet Coşkun (MHP).

== History ==
İspir is known from the 3rd millennium BC. The ancient kingdom of Hayasa-Azzi (2nd millennium BC) was located in the upper reaches of the rivers Euphrates and Chorokh, and included Sper. The name Sper is thought by some to be derived from Saspers, or Sasperi, the name Sper with a Georgian prefix of place Sa-, which evolved into the term Iberian.

The illustrious dynasty of the Bagrationi originated in the most ancient Georgian district – Speri (today İspir). Through their farsighted, flexible policies, the Bagrationi achieved great influence from the sixth through eighth centuries. One of their branches moved out to Armenia, the other to Georgian Kingdom of Iberia, and both won for themselves the dominant position among the other rulers of Transcaucasia.

In the 4th-3rd centuries BC Sper was organized into a province of the Iberian Kingdom as noted by Strabo. Alexander the Great sent one of his generals Menon to conquer Sper, but Menon and his forces were defeated and killed. The region was then a part of Upper Armenia (Armenian: Բարձր Հայք, Bardzr Hayk'), a province of Greater Armenia, since the 2nd century BC to the 5th century AD. After this, Sper was an Armenian Bagratid domain in the 4th - 6th centuries, the territory of which also comprised the Bayburt plain until that was lost to the Byzantines (perhaps in 387).

In the 7th century it passed to the Arab Caliphate; in 885 Bagratuni Kingdom of Armenia. Under the medieval Kingdom of Armenia, it was part of the province of Upper Armenia and was famous for its gold mines. In the 11th century it was conquered by the Seljuqs. Ispir was under the control of the Saltukids till 1124 when the Georgians took over power, governed by Zakare and Ivane Zakarids as a fief. It was recaptured by Mughith ad Din Tughrul, son of the Seljuk sultan Kilij Arslan II, sometime between 1201 and 1225. He built a mosque in the citadel which still survives. It was conquered in 1242 by the Mongols; was regained by Georgian Kingdom during the reign of George V the Brilliant (1314–1346), it remained part of the Kingdom before its disintegration, which then passed into the hands of Georgian Atabegs belonging to the House of Jaqeli; it was conquered in 1502 by Persia and was probably in 1515 taken by the Ottoman Empire from the Georgian ruler of Samtskhe.

The town was occupied in 1916 by the Russians during World War I and the Armenian genocide, then was recaptured by the Turks in 1918.

Historic sights in the town are the citadel, a mosque and a church in the citadel (probably 13th century), the originally 13th century Çarsi mosque's building being a recent structure. The Sultan Melik mosque and Madrasa built in the 13th century, the Madrasa of Kadizade Mehmet built in 1725/26, Kadizade was the Mufti of Erzurum from 1744 to 1759 and his father was the Qadi of Ispir. There is also a tomb with a graveyard containing some Ottoman tombstones.

== Climate ==
The climate is described as Humid continental by Köppen, abbreviated as Dfa.

Climate data for İspir (1991–2020)
Month	Jan	Feb	Mar	Apr	May	Jun	Jul	Aug	Sep	Oct	Nov	Dec	Year
Mean daily maximum °C (°F)	2.5 (36.5)	4.5 (40.1)	10.3 (50.5)	16.7 (62.1)	22.1 (71.8)	27.2 (81.0)	31.3 (88.3)	32.0 (89.6)	27.5 (81.5)	20.2 (68.4)	11.4 (52.5)	4.4 (39.9)	17.6 (63.7)
Daily mean °C (°F)	−2.6 (27.3)	−1.0 (30.2)	4.4 (39.9)	10.0 (50.0)	14.7 (58.5)	19.3 (66.7)	23.3 (73.9)	23.7 (74.7)	18.9 (66.0)	12.5 (54.5)	4.9 (40.8)	−0.6 (30.9)	10.7 (51.3)
Mean daily minimum °C (°F)	−6.5 (20.3)	−5.4 (22.3)	−0.6 (30.9)	4.2 (39.6)	8.3 (46.9)	12.1 (53.8)	16.0 (60.8)	16.4 (61.5)	11.2 (52.2)	6.3 (43.3)	0.1 (32.2)	−4.3 (24.3)	4.9 (40.8)
Average precipitation mm (inches)	28.0 (1.10)	30.43 (1.20)	42.97 (1.69)	54.84 (2.16)	59.51 (2.34)	37.65 (1.48)	25.24 (0.99)	15.9 (0.63)	21.24 (0.84)	42.4 (1.67)	36.43 (1.43)	33.4 (1.31)	428.01 (16.85)
Average precipitation days (≥ 1.0 mm)	5.6	6.0	7.7	9.7	10.3	6.9	4.3	3.3	3.9	6.0	5.4	6.0	75.1
Average relative humidity (%)	69.2	65.7	59.4	57.8	58.1	53.5	49.4	49.4	51.2	60.2	64.8	71.5	59.1
Source: NOAA

== Economy ==
As of 1920, coal was being produced in the area.

== Composition ==
There are 101 neighbourhoods in İspir District:

- Ahlatlı
- Akgüney
- Akpınar
- Akseki
- Aksu
- Aktaş
- Alacabük
- Araköy
- Ardıçlı
- Armutlu
- Aşağıfındıklı
- Aşağıözbağ
- Atürküten
- Avcıköy
- Bademli
- Bahçeli
- Başçeşme
- Başköy
- Başpınar
- Bostancı
- Bozan
- Çakmaklı
- Çamlıca
- Çamlıkaya
- Cankurtaran
- Çatakkaya
- Çayırbaşı
- Çayırözü
- Cibali
- Çiçekli
- Değirmendere
- Değirmenli
- Demirbilek
- Demirkaya
- Devedağı
- Duruköy
- Düzköy
- Elmalı
- Gaziler
- Geçitağzı
- Göçköy
- Gölyurt
- Gülhas
- Güllübağ
- Gündoğdu
- Güney
- Halilpaşa
- İkisu
- İncesu
- Irmakköy
- İyidere
- Karahan
- Karakale
- Karakamış
- Karakaya
- Karaseydi
- Karşıyaka
- Kavaklı
- Kaynakbaşı
- Kirazlı
- Kırık
- Kızılhasan
- Koçköy
- Köprüköy
- Kümetaş
- Leylekköy
- Madenköprübaşı
- Mescitli
- Meydanlı
- Moryayla
- Mülkköy
- Numanpaşa
- Ortaköy
- Ortaören
- Özlüce
- Öztoprak
- Petekli
- Pınarlı
- Sandıklı
- Şenköy
- Sırakonak
- Soğuksu
- Taşbaşı
- Taşlıca
- Tekpınar
- Tepecik
- Ulubel
- Ulutaş
- Üzümbağı
- Yağlı
- Yaylacık
- Yedigöl
- Yedigöze
- Yeşiltepe
- Yeşilyurt
- Yıldıztepe
- Yukarı
- Yukarıfındıklı
- Yukarıözbağ
- Yunusköy
- Zeyrek
