= Atürküten, İspir =

Neighborhood in Turkey

Atürküten
- Neighbourhood
- Location in Turkey
- Coordinates: 40°16′06″N 40°50′00″E
- Country: Turkey
- Province: Erzurum
- District: İspir
- Population (2022): 26
- Time zone: UTC+3 (TRT)

Atürküten is a neighbourhood in the municipality and district of İspir, Erzurum Province in Turkey. Its population is 26, as of 2022.
