= Yeşiltepe, İspir =

Village in Turkey

Yeşiltepe
- Neighbourhood
- Location in Turkey
- Coordinates: 40.2902°N 40.7177°E
- Country: Turkey
- Province: Erzurum
- District: İspir
- Population (2022): 91
- Time zone: UTC+3 (TRT)

Yeşiltepe is a neighbourhood in the municipality and district of İspir, Erzurum Province in Turkey. Its population is 91 (2022).
