= İyidere, İspir =

Village in Turkey

İyidere
- Neighbourhood
- Location in Turkey
- Coordinates: 40°30′54″N 40°51′04″E
- Country: Turkey
- Province: Erzurum
- District: İspir
- Population (2022): 25
- Time zone: UTC+3 (TRT)

İyidere is a neighbourhood in the municipality and district of İspir, Erzurum Province in Turkey. Its population is 25 (2022).
