= Sekman, Horasan =

Village in Turkey

Sekman
- Neighbourhood
- Location in Turkey
- Coordinates: 39°54′24″N 42°15′13″E
- Country: Turkey
- Province: Erzurum
- District: Horasan
- Population (2022): 143
- Time zone: UTC+3 (TRT)

Sekman is a neighbourhood in the municipality and district of Horasan, Erzurum Province in Turkey. Its population is 143 (2022).
