= Halilpaşa, İspir =

Village in Turkey

Halilpaşa
- Neighbourhood
- Location in Turkey
- Coordinates: 40°28′03″N 41°02′34″E
- Country: Turkey
- Province: Erzurum
- District: İspir
- Population (2022): 55
- Time zone: UTC+3 (TRT)

Halilpaşa is a neighbourhood in the municipality and district of İspir, Erzurum Province in Turkey Its population is 55 (2022).
