= Sırakonak, İspir =

Sırakonak Hodiçor, Xodiçur, Xodorçur
- Neighbourhood
- Location in Turkey
- Coordinates: 40°43′57″N 41°11′45.2″E
- Country: Turkey
- Province: Erzurum
- District: İspir
- Population (2022): 251
- Time zone: UTC+3 (TRT)
- Postal code: 25900

Sırakonak (Armenian: Խոտորջուր, romanized: Xotorǰur or Xodorčur) is a neighbourhood in the municipality and district of İspir, Erzurum Province in Turkey. Its population is 251 (2022). It was formerly known as Hodiçor, Xodiçur and Xodorçur. The former names are derived from the Armenian name of the whole valley, the Khodorchur or Khotorjur. Before the Armenian genocide the settlement was the centre of a group of thirteen villages populated by Catholic Christian Armenians

The Armenians of Khodorchur spoke a distinct dialect of Armenian. It belonged to the Western dialects of Armenian, but had features characteristic of the Eastern dialects as well as features unique to itself or shared only with the neighbouring Armenian dialect of Homshetsma. The Khodorchur dialect is now extinct, and no known vocal recordings of it survive.

The Armenian population of the Khodorchur valley was deported at the end of June 1915.
