= Aras, Horasan =

Village in Turkey

Aras
- Neighbourhood
- Location in Turkey
- Coordinates: 39°59′18″N 42°18′23″E
- Country: Turkey
- Province: Erzurum
- District: Horasan
- Population (2022): 297
- Time zone: UTC+3 (TRT)

Aras is a neighbourhood in the municipality and district of Horasan, Erzurum Province in Turkey. Its population is 297 (2022).
