= Yunusköy, İspir =

Village in Turkey

Yunusköy
- Neighbourhood
- Location in Turkey
- Coordinates: 40°15′5″N 40°43′10″E
- Country: Turkey
- Province: Erzurum
- District: İspir
- Population (2022): 96
- Time zone: UTC+3 (TRT)

Yunusköy is a neighbourhood in the municipality and district of İspir, Erzurum Province in Turkey. Its population is 96 (2022).
