= Geçitağzı, İspir =

Village in Turkey

Geçitağzı
- Neighbourhood
- Location in Turkey
- Coordinates: 40°39′09″N 41°17′39″E
- Country: Turkey
- Province: Erzurum
- District: İspir
- Population (2022): 45
- Time zone: UTC+3 (TRT)

Geçitağzı is a neighbourhood in the municipality and district of İspir, Erzurum Province in Turkey. Its population is 45 (2022).
