= Alagöz, Horasan =

Village in Turkey

Alagöz
- Neighbourhood
- Location in Turkey
- Coordinates: 39°54′49″N 42°11′29″E
- Country: Turkey
- Province: Erzurum
- District: Horasan
- Population (2022): 477
- Time zone: UTC+3 (TRT)

Alagöz is a neighbourhood in the municipality and district of Horasan, Erzurum Province in Turkey. Its population is 477 (2022).
