= Yıldıran, Horasan =

Village in Turkey

Yıldıran
- Neighbourhood
- Location in Turkey
- Coordinates: 40°03′28″N 41°56′19″E
- Country: Turkey
- Province: Erzurum
- District: Horasan
- Population (2022): 160
- Time zone: UTC+3 (TRT)

Yıldıran is a neighbourhood in the municipality and district of Horasan, Erzurum Province in Turkey. Its population is 160 (2022).
