= Karaçuha, Horasan =

Village in Turkey

Karaçuha
- Neighbourhood
- Location in Turkey
- Coordinates: 40°00′45″N 41°59′23″E
- Country: Turkey
- Province: Erzurum
- District: Horasan
- Population (2022): 49
- Time zone: UTC+3 (TRT)

Karaçuha is a neighbourhood in the municipality and district of Horasan, Erzurum Province in Turkey. Its population is 49 (2022).
