= Aliçeyrek, Horasan =

Village in Turkey

Aliçeyrek
- Neighbourhood
- Location within Turkey
- Coordinates: 40°02′27″N 42°17′47″E
- Country: Turkey
- Province: Erzurum
- District: Horasan
- Population (2022): 474
- Time zone: UTC+3 (TRT)

Aliçeyrek is a neighbourhood in the municipality and district of Horasan, Erzurum Province in Turkey. Its population is 474 (2022). An Armenian village prior to 1915, the settlement was later settled by Kurds of the Redkan tribe who migrated from the Erivan Governorate.
