= Ahlatlı, İspir =

Village in Turkey

Ahlatlı
- Neighbourhood
- Location in Turkey
- Coordinates: 40.5848°N 41.2897°E
- Country: Turkey
- Province: Erzurum
- District: İspir
- Population (2022): 89
- Time zone: UTC+3 (TRT)

Ahlatlı is a neighbourhood in the municipality and district of İspir, Erzurum Province in Turkey. Its population is 89 (2022).
