= Gündoğdu Square =

Square in İzmir, Turkey

- City square
- {{{other_names}}}
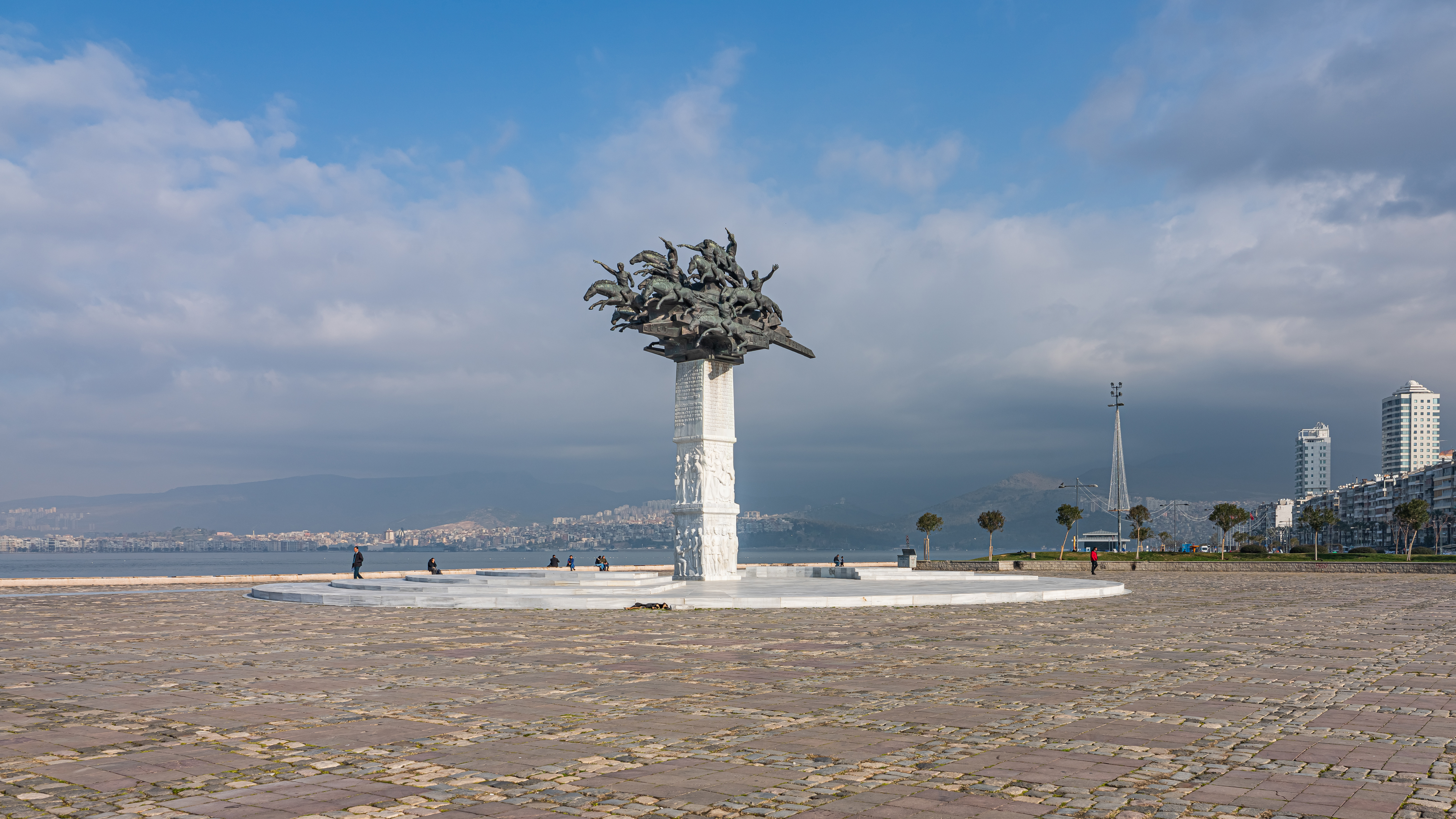
- Looking north to Gündoğdu Square.
- Design: Ferit Özşen (Statue)
- Opened: 15 June 2000
- Owner: İzmir Metropolitan Municipality
- Location: Kordon; İzmir, Turkey
- Interactive map of Gündoğdu Square
- Coordinates: 38.4357°N 27.1393°E

Gündoğdu Square (Turkish: Gündoğdu Meydanı) is a city square in İzmir, Turkey. Located within between the neighborhoods of Alsancak and Konak, it marks the center-point of the Kordon esplanade. At the center of the square is the Tree of the Republic Statue (Turkish: Cumhuriyet Ağacı Heykeli) to commemorate the 80th anniversary of the Republic of Turkey. Located within one of the city's two most famous parks, it is a major meeting point for people as well as staging area for political rallies and demonstrations.

== History ==
Gündoğdu Square is one of the city's new major squares. It was built together with the Kordon esplanade in 2000. Originally, the esplanade was built with the intention of extending a 6-lane highway from Liman Avenue (connecting to the D.300) to central Konak, where it would continue to the O-32, to Çeşme, in Balçova. This plan was heavily opposed by many and was later converted into a park. Construction of the park and square was completed in 1999 and was officially opened to the public on 15 June 2000. In 2003 mayor Ahmet Piriştina requested the construction of a statue to commemorate the 80th anniversary of Republic. Ferit Özşen was chosen to design a statue, which was named the Tree of the Republic. Ever since the square's opening, it has been used for many political rallies by Prime Ministers and party leaders as well as political protests such as the 2007 Republic Protests. Similar to Taksim Square in Istanbul, Gündoğdu Square is the primary meeting point in İzmir for the annual May Day celebrations.

== See also ==
- Cumhuriyet Square
- Konak Square
