= Yayla =

Yayla is the Turkish word for highland, cognate with yaylak. It may refer to:

- Yayla (resort), the name given to tribal yaylaks and summer mountain resorts in Turkey.
- Yaylak, Turkic summer highland pastures, equivalent for the alpine pasture and the associated alpine transhumance
- Yayla Mountains is the Turkish name for the Crimean Mountains
- since this is a common root word in Turkish enriched with suffixes to make other words. It and its derivatives are also used as place names, person names, and brand names.
