= Ulutaş, İspir =

Village in Turkey

Ulutaş
- Neighbourhood
- Country: Turkey
- Province: Erzurum
- District: İspir
- Population (2022): 32
- Time zone: UTC+3 (TRT)

Ulutaş is a neighbourhood in the municipality and district of İspir, Erzurum Province in Turkey. Its population is 32 (2022).
