= Yarboğaz, Horasan =

Village in Turkey

Yarboğaz
- Neighbourhood
- Location in Turkey
- Coordinates: 39°57′N 42°13′E
- Country: Turkey
- Province: Erzurum
- District: Horasan
- Population (2022): 340
- Time zone: UTC+3 (TRT)

Yarboğaz is a neighbourhood in the municipality and district of Horasan, Erzurum Province in Turkey. Its population is 340 (2022).
