= Numanpaşa, İspir =

Village in Turkey

Numanpaşa
- Neighbourhood
- Location in Turkey
- Coordinates: 40°33′N 41°07′E
- Country: Turkey
- Province: Erzurum
- District: İspir
- Population (2022): 107
- Time zone: UTC+3 (TRT)

Numanpaşa is a neighbourhood in the municipality and district of İspir, Erzurum Province in Turkey. Its population is 107 (2022).
