= Mollamelik, Horasan =

Village in Turkey

Mollamelik
- Neighbourhood
- Location in Turkey
- Coordinates: 40°06′55″N 42°02′47″E
- Country: Turkey
- Province: Erzurum
- District: Horasan
- Population (2022): 22
- Time zone: UTC+3 (TRT)

Mollamelik is a neighbourhood in the municipality and district of Horasan, Erzurum Province in Turkey. Its population is 22 (2022).
