= Aksu, İspir =

Village in Turkey

Aksu
- Neighbourhood
- Location in Turkey
- Coordinates: 40.6098°N 41.0921°E
- Country: Turkey
- Province: Erzurum
- District: İspir
- Population (2022): 349
- Time zone: UTC+3 (TRT)

Aksu is a neighbourhood in the municipality and district of İspir, Erzurum Province in Turkey. Its population is 349 (2022).
