= Aktaş, İspir =

Village in Turkey

Aktaş
- Neighbourhood
- Location in Turkey
- Coordinates: 40.4382°N 41.0671°E
- Country: Turkey
- Province: Erzurum
- District: İspir
- Population (2023): 16
- Time zone: UTC+3 (TRT)

Aktaş is a neighbourhood in the municipality and district of İspir, Erzurum Province in Turkey. Its population is 16 (2023).
