= Eğertaşlar, Horasan =

Village in Turkey

Eğertaşlar
- Neighbourhood
- Location in Turkey
- Coordinates: 39°56′N 42°30′E
- Country: Turkey
- Province: Erzurum
- District: Horasan
- Population (2022): 141
- Time zone: UTC+3 (TRT)

Eğertaşlar is a neighbourhood in the municipality and district of Horasan, Erzurum Province in Turkey. Its population is 141 (2022).
