= Aşağıbademözü, Horasan =

Village in Turkey

Aşağıbademözü
- Neighbourhood
- Location within Turkey
- Coordinates: 40°08′21″N 42°10′54″E
- Country: Turkey
- Province: Erzurum
- District: Horasan
- Population (2022): 64
- Time zone: UTC+3 (TRT)

Aşağıbademözü is a neighbourhood in the municipality and district of Horasan, Erzurum Province in Turkey. Its population is 64 (2022). The village is populated by Meskhetian Turks.
