= Akçatoprak, Horasan =

Village in Turkey

Akçatoprak
- Neighbourhood
- Location within Turkey
- Coordinates: 39.9003°N 42.1145°E
- Country: Turkey
- Province: Erzurum
- District: Horasan
- Population (2022): 189
- Time zone: UTC+3 (TRT)

Akçatoprak is a neighbourhood in the municipality and district of Horasan, Erzurum Province in Turkey. Its population is 189 (2022). Was a predominantly Armenian village prior to 1915.
