= Döllek, Horasan =

Village in Turkey

Döllek
- Neighbourhood
- Location within Turkey
- Coordinates: 39°59′N 42°05′E
- Country: Turkey
- Province: Erzurum
- District: Horasan
- Population (2022): 82
- Time zone: UTC+3 (TRT)

Döllek is a neighbourhood in the municipality and district of Horasan, Erzurum Province in Turkey. Its population is 82 (2022). It's residents are Sunni Turks.
