= Akgüney, İspir =

Village in Turkey

Akgüney
- Neighbourhood
- Location in Turkey
- Coordinates: 40.4870°N 40.8334°E
- Country: Turkey
- Province: Erzurum
- District: İspir
- Population (2022): 28
- Time zone: UTC+3 (TRT)

Akgüney is a neighbourhood in the municipality and district of İspir, Erzurum Province in Turkey. Its population is 28 (2022).
