= Horasan =

- District and municipality
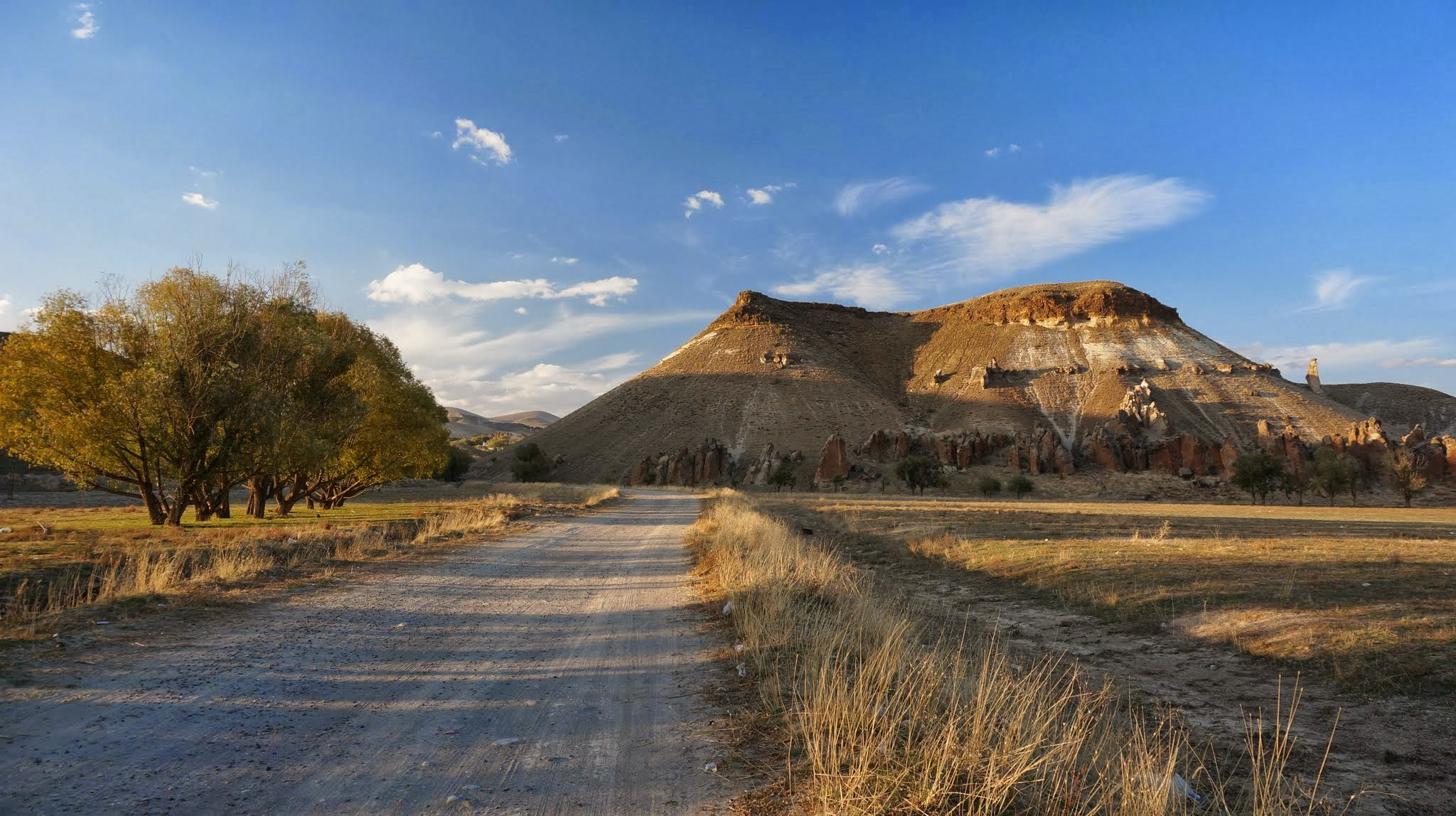
- Tavşancık landscape, Horasan

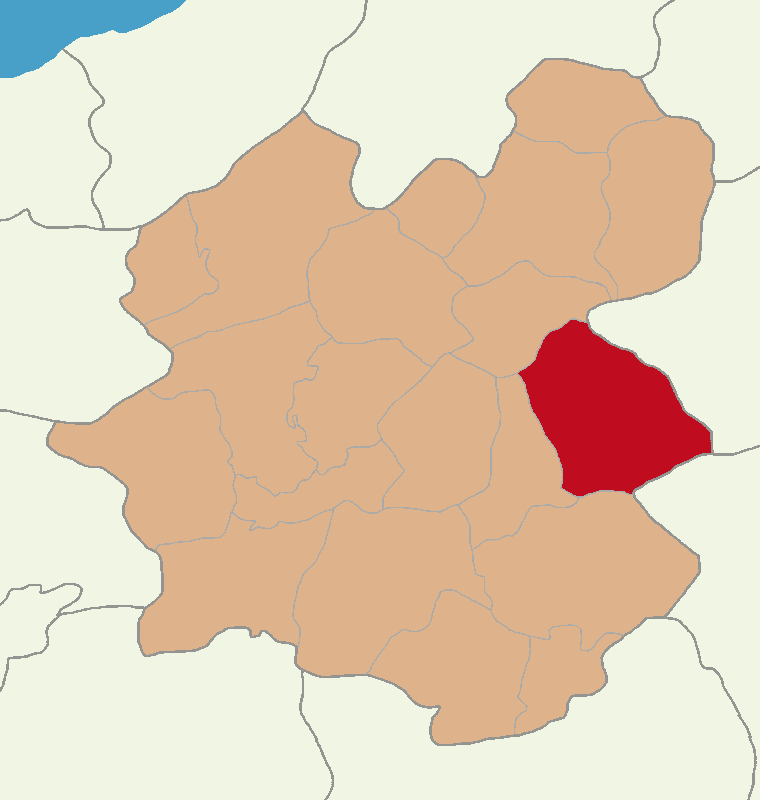
- Map showing Horasan District in Erzurum Province

- Location within Turkey
- Coordinates: 40°02′23″N 42°10′16″E
- Country: Turkey
- Province: Erzurum

Government
  - Mayor: Hayrettin Özdemir (AKP)
- Area: 1,740 km^{2} (670 sq mi)
- Population (2022): 36,519
  - Density: 21.0/km^{2} (54.4/sq mi)
- Time zone: UTC+3 (TRT)
- Postal code: 25800
- Area code: 0442
- Climate: Dfb

Horasan (Kurdish: Xoresan), is a municipality and district of Erzurum Province, Turkey. Its area is 1,740 km^{2}, and its population is 36,519 (2022). The mayor is Hayrettin Özdemir (AKP).

Horasan is located in the east of Erzurum Province, and borders the provinces of Ağrı and Kars.

== Etymology ==
Horasan is also one of the spellings of the Khorasan (or Greater Khorasan), which is a region in north east Iran with historical importance, and it is also the source of the name of the town as the first settlers of the town migrated from this region.

== History ==
The most recent information on the history of Horasan is based on Atatürk University research and documentary producer Tekin Gün's notes, doing research at the district. It appears that the first traces of civilization in the district having remains of the Bronze Age point to the place's history from the year of 4000 B.C. Holding a strategic role in the East–West connection via the Silk Road, the location of Horasan is home to ancient settlements and was a scene to early civil advancements. It is predicted that Horasan is the origin of the Aryan people spreading to India and Iran. Various Turkic peoples under Göktürk and Hunnic rule, as well as the Mogols, immigrated to Horasan after the invasions of the Arabs and Genghis Khan. In following years, the land saw Roman, Assyrian, Urartu, Median and Persian, Sasani, Arabic and Byzantine invasions, according to written archives.

== Composition ==
There are 87 neighbourhoods in Horasan District:

- Adnanmenderes
- Ağıllı
- Akçataş
- Akçatoprak
- Alagöz
- Aliçeyrek
- Aras
- Ardı
- Arpaçayır
- Aşağıaktaş
- Aşağıbademözü
- Azap
- Bahçe
- Bulgurlu
- Camiikebir
- Çamlıkale
- Çamurlu
- Çayırdüzü
- Çiftlik
- Dalbaşı
- Danişment
- Değirmenler
- Dikili
- Döllek
- Dönertaş
- Eğertaşlar
- Esentepe
- Fatih Sultan Mehmet
- Gerek
- Gündeğer
- Güzelyayla
- Hacıahmet
- Hacıhalil
- Harçlı
- Hasanbaba
- Hasanbey
- Haydarlı
- Hızardere
- Hızırilyas
- İğdeli
- Iğırbığır
- İncesu
- İnönü
- Kadıcelal
- Kalender
- Karabıyık
- Karacaören
- Karaçuha
- Karapınar
- Kaynarca
- Kazım Karabekir
- Kemerli
- Kepenek
- Kırık
- Kırkdikme
- Kırkgözeler
- Kırklar
- Kızılca
- Kızlarkale
- Küçükkonak
- Kükürtlü
- Mollaahmet
- Mollamelik
- Mümtazturan
- Muratbağı
- Pinarli
- Pirali
- Pirhasan
- Recep Tayyip Erdoğan
- Saçlık
- Sekman
- Şerefiye
- Şeyhyusuf
- Tahirhoca
- Tavşancık
- Teknecik
- Yarboğaz
- Yaylacık
- Yazılıtaş
- Yeşildere
- Yeşilöz
- Yıldıran
- Yukarıbademözü
- Yukarıhorum
- Yukarıtahirhoca
- Yürükatlı
- Yüzören

== Climate ==
Horasan has a humid continental climate (Köppen: Dfb). Winters are very cold, with temperatures consistently below freezing. January, the coldest month, has an average temperature around −10 °C (14 °F). Summers are dry, with hot days and cool nights. Precipitation is fairly low year-round but peaks in spring.

Climate data for Horasan (1991–2020)
Month	Jan	Feb	Mar	Apr	May	Jun	Jul	Aug	Sep	Oct	Nov	Dec	Year
Mean daily maximum °C (°F)	−4.3 (24.3)	−1.9 (28.6)	5.9 (42.6)	14.5 (58.1)	20.0 (68.0)	25.6 (78.1)	30.2 (86.4)	30.9 (87.6)	26.1 (79.0)	18.7 (65.7)	9.1 (48.4)	−0.8 (30.6)	14.6 (58.3)
Daily mean °C (°F)	−10.2 (13.6)	−8.1 (17.4)	−0.3 (31.5)	7.4 (45.3)	12.4 (54.3)	17.0 (62.6)	21.1 (70.0)	21.4 (70.5)	16.3 (61.3)	9.7 (49.5)	1.6 (34.9)	−6.4 (20.5)	6.9 (44.4)
Mean daily minimum °C (°F)	−15.2 (4.6)	−13.3 (8.1)	−5.6 (21.9)	1.2 (34.2)	5.4 (41.7)	8.3 (46.9)	11.9 (53.4)	11.9 (53.4)	6.8 (44.2)	2.1 (35.8)	−4.2 (24.4)	−11.1 (12.0)	−0.1 (31.8)
Average precipitation mm (inches)	18.23 (0.72)	20.42 (0.80)	35.69 (1.41)	52.39 (2.06)	67.98 (2.68)	38.87 (1.53)	23.03 (0.91)	17.87 (0.70)	17.65 (0.69)	34.67 (1.36)	25.42 (1.00)	24.62 (0.97)	376.84 (14.84)
Average precipitation days (≥ 1.0 mm)	4.1	4.8	6.3	8.8	10.5	6.7	5.0	3.5	3.4	5.7	5.0	5.0	68.8
Average relative humidity (%)	76.2	75.4	69.9	61.5	61.2	55.4	50.0	47.5	50.2	62.2	70.0	77.0	63.1
Source: NOAA
