= Akçataş, Horasan =

Village in Turkey

Akçataş
- Neighbourhood
- Location within Turkey
- Coordinates: 40°7′11″N 42°8′38″E
- Country: Turkey
- Province: Erzurum
- District: Horasan
- Population (2022): 199
- Time zone: UTC+3 (TRT)

Akçataş is a neighbourhood in the municipality and district of Horasan, Erzurum Province in Turkey. Its population is 199 (2022). The village's original name was Dzandzağ.
