= Cibali, İspir =

Village in Turkey

Cibali
- Neighbourhood
- Location in Turkey
- Coordinates: 40°16′07″N 40°46′07″E
- Country: Turkey
- Province: Erzurum
- District: İspir
- Population (2022): 86
- Time zone: UTC+3 (TRT)

Cibali is a neighbourhood in the municipality and district of İspir, Erzurum Province in Turkey. Its population is 86 (2022).
