= Tavşancık, Horasan =

Village in Turkey

Tavşancık
- Neighbourhood
- Country: Turkey
- Province: Erzurum
- District: Horasan
- Population (2022): 383
- Time zone: UTC+3 (TRT)

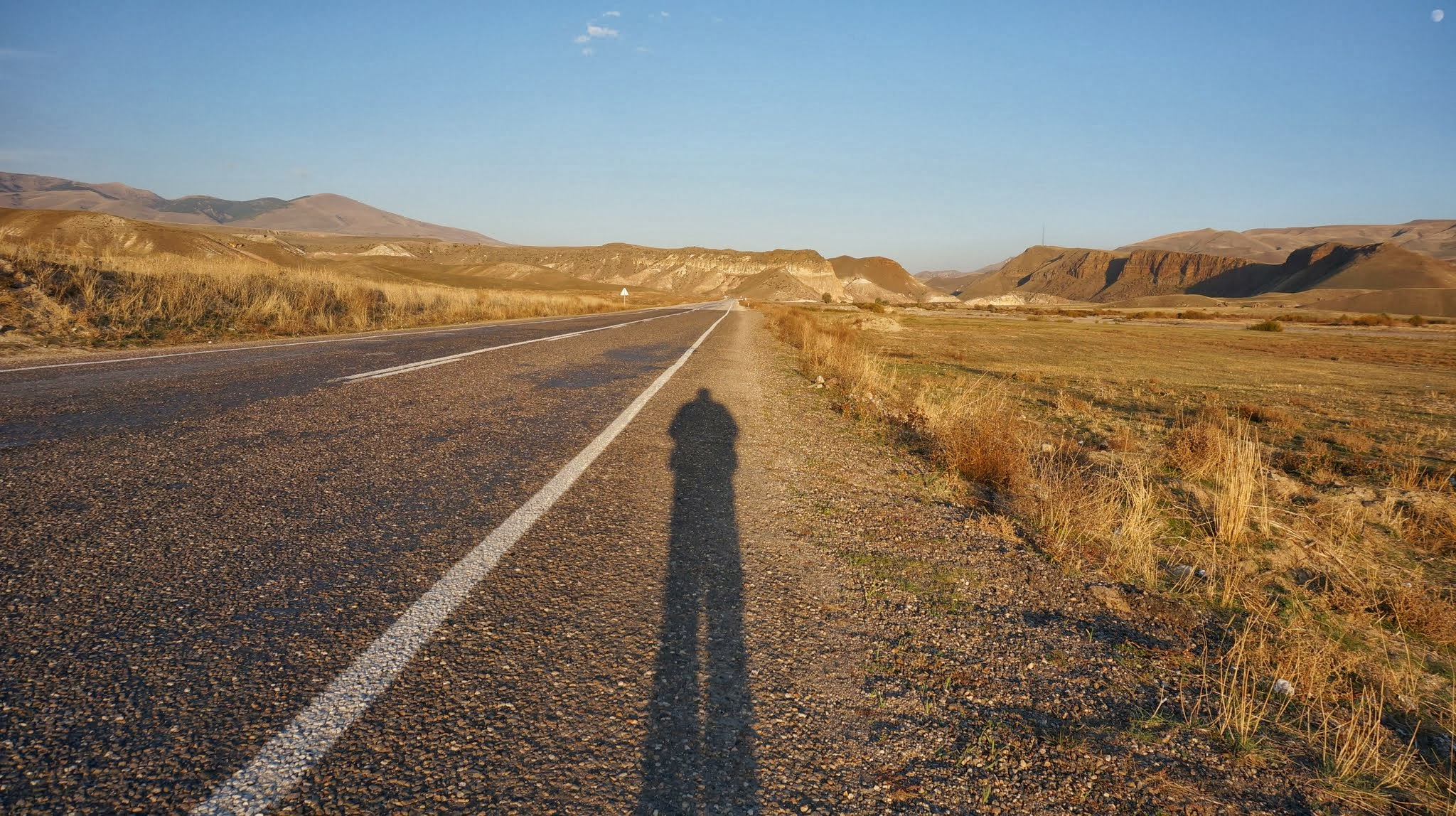

Tavşancık is a neighbourhood in the municipality and district of Horasan, Erzurum Province in Turkey. Its population is 383 (2022).
