= Köprüköy, İspir =

Village in Turkey

Köprüköy
- Neighbourhood
- Location in Turkey
- Coordinates: 40°25′45″N 40°58′42″E
- Country: Turkey
- Province: Erzurum
- District: İspir
- Population (2022): 224
- Time zone: UTC+3 (TRT)

Köprüköy is a neighbourhood in the municipality and district of İspir, Erzurum Province in Turkey. Its population is 224 (2022).
