= Araköy, Narman =

Village in Turkey

Araköy
- Neighbourhood
- Location in Turkey
- Coordinates: 40.3823°N 41.9409°E
- Country: Turkey
- Province: Erzurum
- District: Narman
- Population (2022): 271
- Time zone: UTC+3 (TRT)

Araköy is a neighbourhood in the municipality and district of Narman, Erzurum Province in Turkey. Its population is 271 (2022).
