= Çayırözü, İspir =

Village in Turkey

Çayırözü
- Neighbourhood
- Country: Turkey
- Province: Erzurum
- District: İspir
- Population (2022): 114
- Time zone: UTC+3 (TRT)

Çayırözü is a neighbourhood in the municipality and district of İspir, Erzurum Province in Turkey. Its population was 114 as of 2022.
