= Bahçeli, İspir =

Village in Turkey

Bahçeli
- Neighbourhood
- Location in Turkey
- Coordinates: 40.5699°N 41.0592°E
- Country: Turkey
- Province: Erzurum
- District: İspir
- Population (2022): 166
- Time zone: UTC+3 (TRT)

Bahçeli is a neighbourhood in the municipality and district of İspir, Erzurum Province in Turkey. Its population is 166 (2022).
