= Yukarıfındıklı, İspir =

Village in Turkey

Yukarıfındıklı
- Neighbourhood
- Country: Turkey
- Province: Erzurum
- District: İspir
- Population (2022): 81
- Time zone: UTC+3 (TRT)

Yukarıfındıklı is a neighbourhood in the municipality and district of İspir, Erzurum Province in Turkey. Its population is 81 (2022).
