= Kirazlı, İspir =

Village in Turkey

Kirazlı
- Neighbourhood
- Country: Turkey
- Province: Erzurum
- District: İspir
- Population (2022): 96
- Time zone: UTC+3 (TRT)

Kirazlı is a neighbourhood in the municipality and district of İspir, Erzurum Province in Turkey. Its population is 96 (2022). In late 2021, it was subject to a storm that killed 4 people and injured 38 more, affecting ~87% of the living population. Higher officials were quickly subject to political outcry upon the disaster as they did not sufficiently warn the people of the storm.
