= Zeyrek, İspir =

Village in Turkey

Zeyrek
- Neighbourhood
- Location in Turkey
- Coordinates: 40°18′52″N 40°59′29″E
- Country: Turkey
- Province: Erzurum
- District: İspir
- Population (2022): 162
- Time zone: UTC+3 (TRT)

Zeyrek is a neighbourhood in the municipality and district of İspir, Erzurum Province in Turkey. Its population is 162 (2022).
