= Başçeşme, İspir =

Village in Turkey

Başçeşme
- Neighbourhood
- Location in Turkey
- Coordinates: 40.5300°N 40.8355°E
- Country: Turkey
- Province: Erzurum
- District: İspir
- Population (2022): 77
- Time zone: UTC+3 (TRT)

Başçeşme is a neighbourhood in the municipality and district of İspir, Erzurum Province in Turkey. Its population is 77 (2022).
