= Araköy, İspir =

Village in Turkey

Araköy
- Neighbourhood
- Location in Turkey
- Coordinates: 40.5590°N 41.2547°E
- Country: Turkey
- Province: Erzurum
- District: İspir
- Population (2022): 30
- Time zone: UTC+3 (TRT)

Araköy is a neighbourhood in the municipality and district of İspir, Erzurum Province in Turkey. Its population is 30 (2022).
