= Bostancı, İspir =

Village in Turkey

Bostancı
- Neighbourhood
- Location in Turkey
- Coordinates: 40.4396°N 41.0638°E
- Country: Turkey
- Province: Erzurum
- District: İspir
- Population (2022): 27
- Time zone: UTC+3 (TRT)

Bostancı is a neighbourhood in the municipality and district of İspir, Erzurum Province in Turkey. Its population is 27 (2022).
