= Taşbaşı, İspir =

Village in Turkey

Taşbaşı
- Neighbourhood
- Location in Turkey
- Coordinates: 40°25′44″N 41°01′25″E
- Country: Turkey
- Province: Erzurum
- District: İspir
- Population (2022): 24
- Time zone: UTC+3 (TRT)

Taşbaşı is a neighbourhood in the municipality and district of İspir, Erzurum Province in Turkey. Its population is 24 (2022).
