= Ardıçlı, İspir =

Village in Turkey

Ardıçlı
- Neighbourhood
- Location in Turkey
- Coordinates: 40.5652°N 41.2279°E
- Country: Turkey
- Province: Erzurum
- District: İspir
- Population (2022): 139
- Time zone: UTC+3 (TRT)

Ardıçlı is a neighbourhood in the municipality and district of İspir, Erzurum Province in Turkey. Its population is 139 (2022).
