= Ortaören, İspir =

Village in Turkey

Ortaören
- Neighbourhood
- Country: Turkey
- Province: Erzurum
- District: İspir
- Population (2022): 49
- Time zone: UTC+3 (TRT)

Ortaören is a neighbourhood in the municipality and district of İspir, Erzurum Province in Turkey. Its population is 49 (2022).
