= Akseki, İspir =

Village in Turkey

Akseki
- Neighbourhood
- Location in Turkey
- Coordinates: 40.2884°N 40.9969°E
- Country: Turkey
- Province: Erzurum
- District: İspir
- Population (2022): 26
- Time zone: UTC+3 (TRT)

Akseki is a neighbourhood in the municipality and district of İspir, Erzurum Province in Turkey. Its population is 26 (2022).
