= Tepecik, İspir =

Village in Turkey

Tepecik
- Neighbourhood
- Country: Turkey
- Province: Erzurum
- District: İspir
- Population (2022): 75
- Time zone: UTC+3 (TRT)

Tepecik is a neighbourhood in the municipality and district of İspir, Erzurum Province in Turkey. Its population is 75 (2022).
