= Ağıllı, Horasan =

Village in Turkey

Ağuli
- Neighbourhood
- Location within Turkey
- Coordinates: 39°53′46″N 42°24′35″E
- Country: Turkey
- Province: Erzurum
- District: Horasan
- Population (2022): 356
- Time zone: UTC+3 (TRT)

Ağıllı is a neighbourhood in the municipality and district of Horasan, Erzurum Province in Turkey. Its population is 356 (2022). In 1878, 152 people (20 households) lived in the village. It's residents are Sunni Kurds from the Redkan tribe.
