= Bahçe, Horasan =

Village in Turkey

Bahçe
- Neighbourhood
- Location in Turkey
- Coordinates: 40°7′57″N 42°2′11″E
- Country: Turkey
- Province: Erzurum
- District: Horasan
- Population (2022): 81
- Time zone: UTC+3 (TRT)

Bahçe (also: Bahçeköy) is a neighbourhood in the municipality and district of Horasan, Erzurum Province in Turkey. Its population is 81 (2022).
