= Yagub Ahmadov =

Azerbaijani politician (1927–2005)

- Yaqub Əhmədov
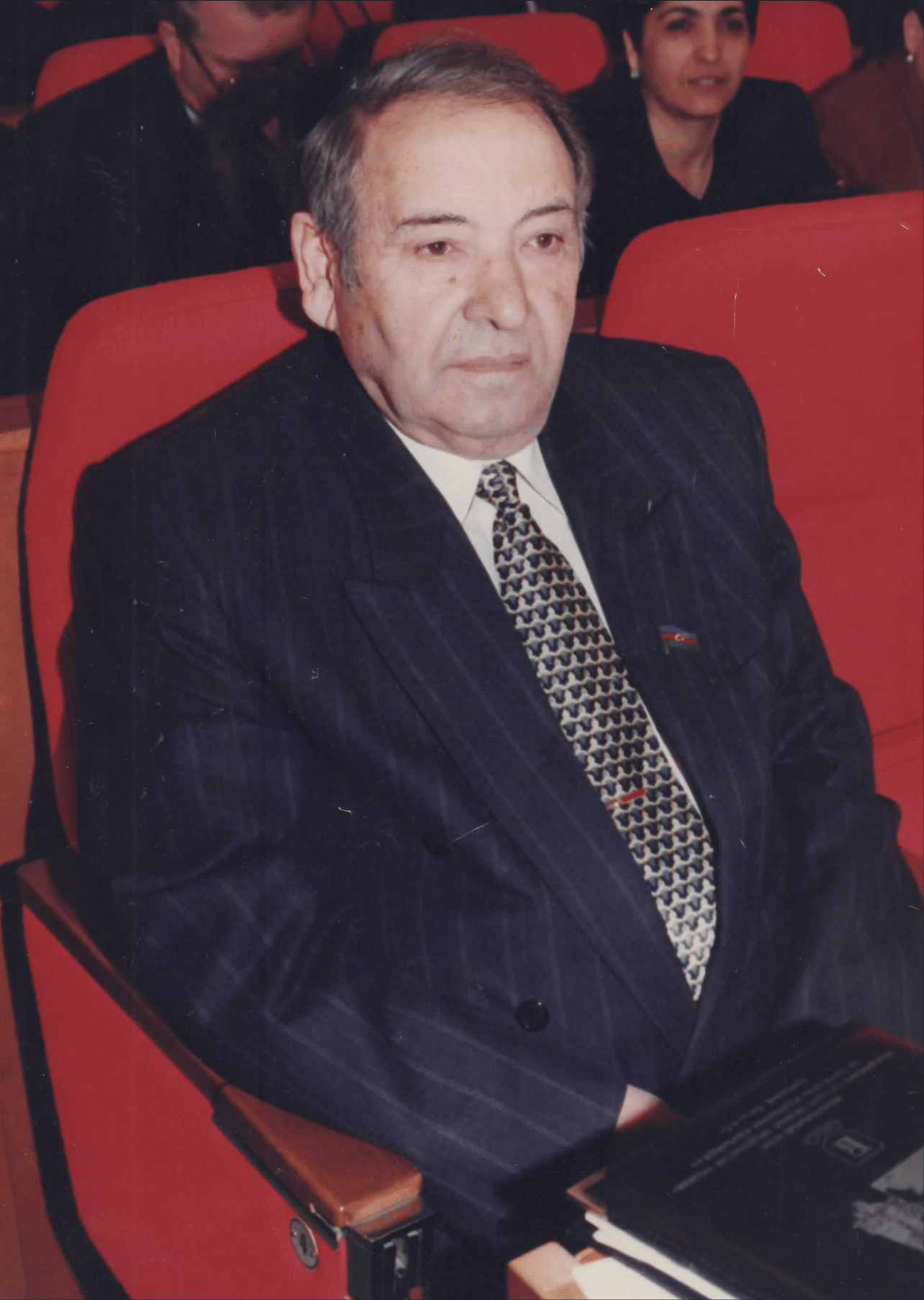

Deputy of the Milli Majlis of Azerbaijan
- Preceded by: Sofig Huseynov
- Succeeded by: Bakhtiyar Sadigov

Personal details
- Born: May 7, 1927 Karadagli, Azerbaijan SSR, USSR
- Died: January 5, 2005 (aged 77) Baku, Azerbaijan
- Party: New Azerbaijan Party

Yagub Ahmadov (Azerbaijani: Əhmədov Yaqub Alış oğlu; May 7, 1927, Garadagli – January 5, 2005, Baku) was an agronomist in the Republic of Azerbaijan, also a philanthropist and deputy of the first convocation of the Azerbaijan Milli Majlis.

== Life ==
Yagub Ahmadov was born on May 7, 1927, in Garadagli village of Agdam region. In 1950, he graduated from secondary school No. 1 of Agdam city and entered the Azerbaijan Agricultural Institute.

Yagub Ahmadov died on January 5, 2005, in Baku.

He was married, and had six children.

== Labor activity ==
In 1955–1960, he worked in the positions of agronomist, chief agronomist of Garvand MTS (Machine tractor station), head of agricultural inspectorate of Agdam district, second secretary of party committee of Agdam district.

In 1960–1964, he worked as the Chairman of the Agdam Region "Orjanikidze" Kolkhoz (It covers Mahrızli and Zangishali villages of the district), and worked as the head of the combined kolkhoz-sovkhoz (that is, Agdam and Agjabadi district collective farm-state production department, which has become one territorial unit).

Since 1964, after the separation of Agdam and Aghjabadi regions, he worked as the head of the Agdam region, collective farm-state farm production department.

In 1970–1972, he was the head of the department of the Ministry of Agriculture of the Republic of Azerbaijan.

In 1972–1976, he worked as the director of "Inqilab" State Farm, which covers Khidirli village of Agdam.

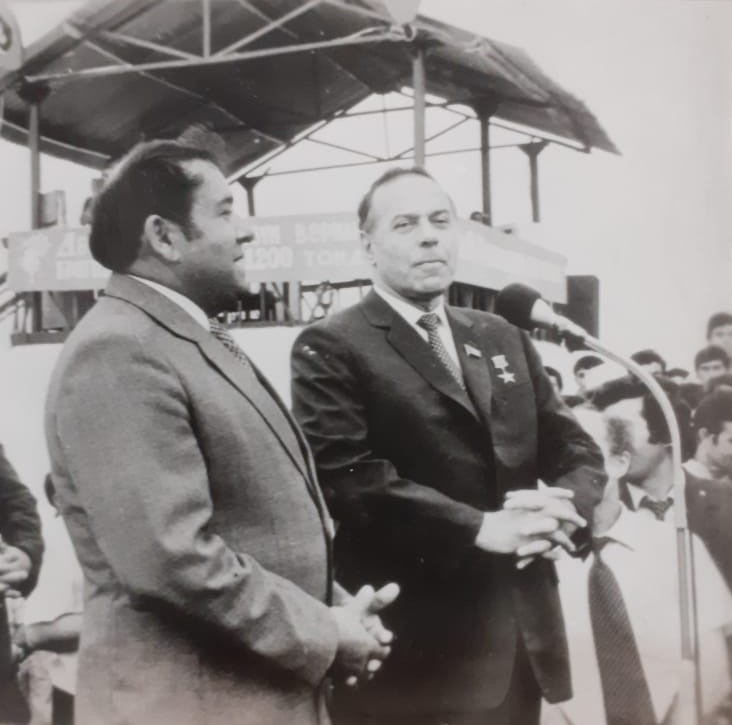
The great leader Heydar Aliyev's visit to the Husyu Hajiyev state farm headed by Yakub Ahmadov. 1981

In 1976–1989, he was the director of Husyu Hajiyev State Farm, one of the largest farms in Azerbaijan, covering Gullujeh, Tagbeyli, Ilkhicilar and Suma villages of Aghdam.

In 1989–1992, he worked as the chairman of the collective farm in the village of Garadagli, Agdam.

From 1992 until the end of his life, he worked as a senior researcher at the Erosion Science and Research Institute of the Ministry of Agriculture of the Republic of Azerbaijan.

Sofig Huseynov, a neutral member of parliament of the 1st convocation of the National Assembly of the Republic of Azerbaijan, elected for the 48th Aghdam village electoral district, died on December 30, 1997, at the age of 47. Re-elections for the mandate vacated by Sofig Huseynov were scheduled for August 1998. Yagub Ahmadov, a neutral candidate for Aghdam village electoral district No. 48, was elected as a deputy after collecting 17,300 (49.7%) votes.

== Charity ==
At that time, the drinking water needs of the population of the village of Khydydirli in Agdam were only partially met by water trucks. And there was almost no other water source. At that time, on the initiative of Yagub Ahmadov, it was possible to drill 10-15 artesian wells on the right side of the Agdam-Khankendi road, to establish water sources and to supply water to the rural population and farms through pipes.

As the director of the State Farm named after Husu Hajiyev, he quickly managed to develop the state farm and build the infrastructure.

He repaired the roads of these villages, which are separated to the right of the Yevlakh and Aghdam highway, planted gardens along the road and took measures to illuminate the roads.

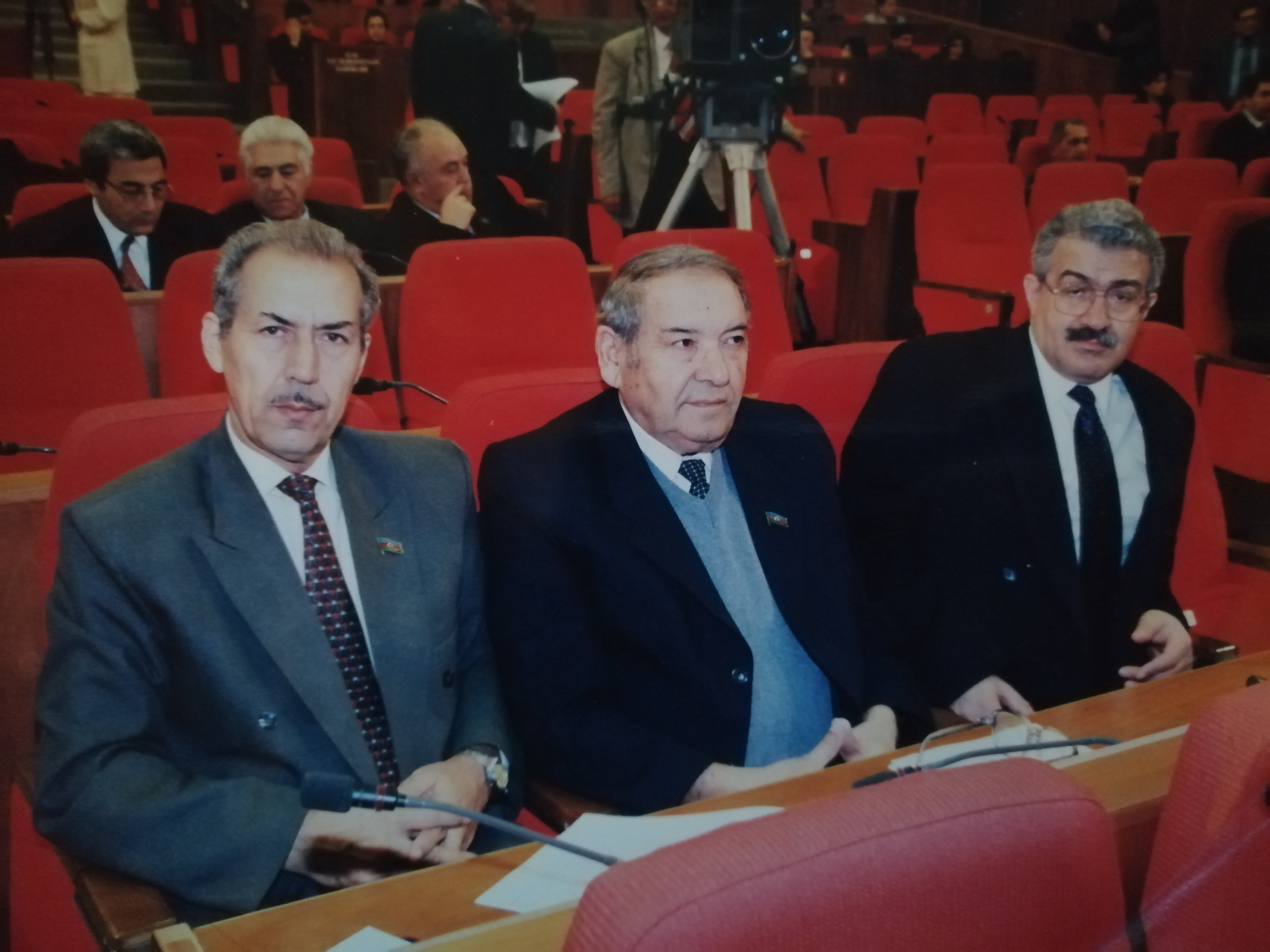
From left to right Khanhuseyn Kazimli (deputy), Yagub Ahmadov, Fikret Sadigov (head of Azeri Chemistry State Company).

== Works ==
Yagub Ahmadov is the author of the books "High wheat harvest" (1972), "Ways of forage intensification" (1993). He is the author of numerous monographs on fodder issues in agriculture, problems of growing sugar beets for fodder and other topics of agronomy. These monographs and articles were published in well-known scientific publications of the USSR.

== Honors and awards ==
According to the decree of the Presidium of the Supreme Soviet of the USSR, Yagub Ahmadov was awarded the Red Labor Flag, "Badge of Honor" orders and the "For Labor Courage" medal.
