= Kuzgun =

Kuzgun may refer to:

- Kuzgun (2019 TV series)
- Kuzgun Acar, (1928 - 1976) Turkish sculptor
- Kuzgun, Aziziye, Erzurum, Turkey
- Kuzgun, Karaisalı, Adana, Turkey
- Kuzgun Dam, on the Serçeme River in Erzurum, Turkey
- Kuzgun-Akhmerovo, Bashkortostan, Russia
- Kuzgun (rocket family), Turkish rocket family
