= Gyullidzha =

Gyullidzha or Gyullija or Gyulyudzha may refer to:

- Sarahart, Armenia
- Spandaryan, Shirak, Armenia
- Tsaghkut, Armenia
- Vardenis, Aragatsotn, Armenia
- Güllücə, Azerbaijan
- Gyulyudzha, Iran

== See also ==
- Güllüce (disambiguation)
