= Güllüce =

Güllüce may refer to:

- İdris Güllüce (born 1950), Turkish politician
- Güllücə, a village in Azerbaijan
- Gyullidzha (disambiguation), various places in the Caucasus
- Güllüce, Aziziye
- Güllüce, Bayburt, a village in the District of Bayburt, Bayburt Province, Turkey
- Güllüce, Erzincan
- Güllüce, Ezine
- Güllüce, Gümüşhacıköy, a village in the District of Gümüşhacıköy, Amasya Province, Turkey
- Güllüce, Karakoçan
- Güllüce, Kozluk, a village in the District of Kozluk, Batman Province, Turkey
- Güllüce, Mustafakemalpaşa
- Güllüce, Palu
- Güllüce, Turkish name of Kafkanas, an island of Greece
