= Alaybeyi =

Alaybeyi can refer to:

- Alaybeyi, Aziziye
- Alaybeyi, İmamoğlu
