= Başovacık =

Başovacık can refer to:

- Başovacık, Aziziye
- Başovacık, Kurşunlu
