= Koyunevi =

Koyunevi may refer to:

- Koyunevi, Ayvacık
- Koyunevi, İmamoğlu
