= Kabaktepe =

Kabaktepe can refer to:

- Kabaktepe, Aziziye
- Kabaktepe, Kozan
