= Uluçınar =

Uluçınar can refer to:

- Uluçınar, İmamoğlu
- Uluçınar, Kemah
