= Sevinçli =

Sevinçli may refer to:

- Sevinçli, Aksaray, village in Aksaray Province, Turkey
- Sevinçli, İmamoğlu, village in Adana Province, Turkey
