= Yeşilvadi =

Yeşilvadi can refer to:

- Yeşilvadi, Aziziye
- Yeşilvadi, Gerede
- Yeşilvadi, Serik
