= Lake Aygır (Erzurum) =

Lake in Turkey

- Location within Turkey
- Location: Uzunyayla Village, Yakutiye, Erzurum Province
- Coordinates: 40.20731°N 41.23578°E
- Basin countries: Turkey
- Surface elevation: 2.800 m (9 ft 2.2 in)

Lake Aygır (Turkish: Aygır Gölü); is a lake in the Yakutiye district of Erzurum province. It is one of the highest lakes in Turkey.

== Geology and geomorphology ==
Aygır Lake is 41 kilometers away from Erzurum city center. The lake is elliptical and has an average depth of 25-30 meters. The lake waters are poured into the Sırlı Creek and then the Kuzgun Dam.
