= Efetli =

Efetli may refer to:

- Əfətli, Azerbaijan
- Evoğlu, Agdam, Azerbaijan
