= Yagub =

Yagub is a given name. Notable people with the name include:

- Yagub Ahmadov (1927–2005), Azerbaijani agronomist
- Yagub Eyyubov (born 1945), Azerbaijani politician
- Yagub Mammadov (politician) (born 1941), President of Azerbaijan
- Yagub Mammadov (singer) (1930–2002), Azerbaijani singer
