= Saint Narek chapel =

Saint Narek chapel Սուրբ Նարեկ մատուռ
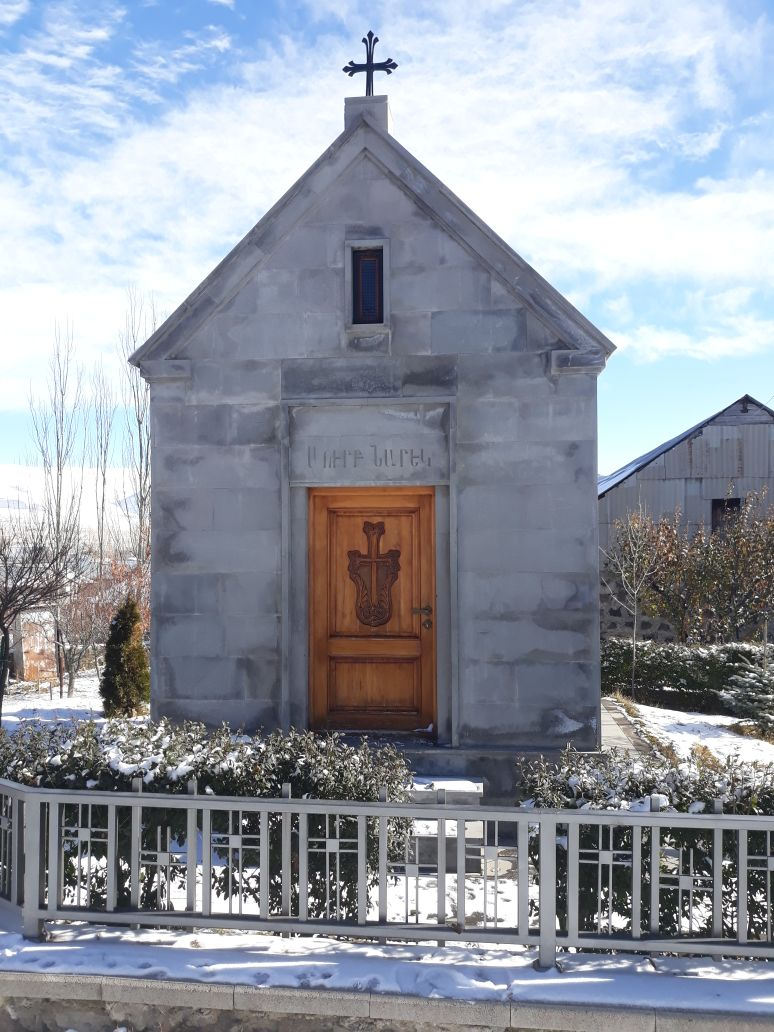
- Saint Narek chapel in 2018

- Location within Armenia

Religion
- Affiliation: Armenian Apostolic Church
- Status: Active

Location
- Location: Aragatsotn Province, Vardenis

Architecture
- Style: Armenian
- Completed: 2012

Saint Narek chapel is a chapel of the Armenian Apostolic Church in Vardenis village, Aragatsotn Province, Armenia. The chapel was built in 2012 in the place known as the Narek of Papé. The chapel was anointed on 25 August 2012.

== History ==
For centuries there was a Gospel called "Narek of Papé" in the village of Aparan, Kyuluja (now Vardenis). The book belonged to a family whose paternal name was Papé, and it was called Narek not because it was the "Book of Lamentations" by Gregory of Narek, as it was customary for people to call it so, but for the fact that although it was a Gospel, it had a healing ability, so the villagers called it "Papé's Narek". It was about the Gospel of miraculous medicine published in Constantinople in 1710. Papé was carrying the book, and later it was in the house of his relatives, near the church of St. Hakob in the village.

== Legend ==
Over time, Papé's descendants gradually left that house and settled in different parts of the world, naturally carrying the sacred book, Papé's Narek. The house remains in ruins, but despite this, the villagers come to a half-empty house and set holy pictures, light candles and do prayers at approximately the same place where the books were put.

== Chapel construction ==
Starting in 2010, when the decision to reconstruct the village of St. Hakob was made, it was also decided to take the place of the house that was on the edge of collapse, which was already a holy place without a holy book, to build a chapel where Papé's Narek would later be laid. Later contacts were established with the Papé's descendants abroad, with whom the book was moved to Armenia, and after two years of reconstruction in Matenadaran, put in "St. Narek" chapel with special preserving conditions.

== Description ==
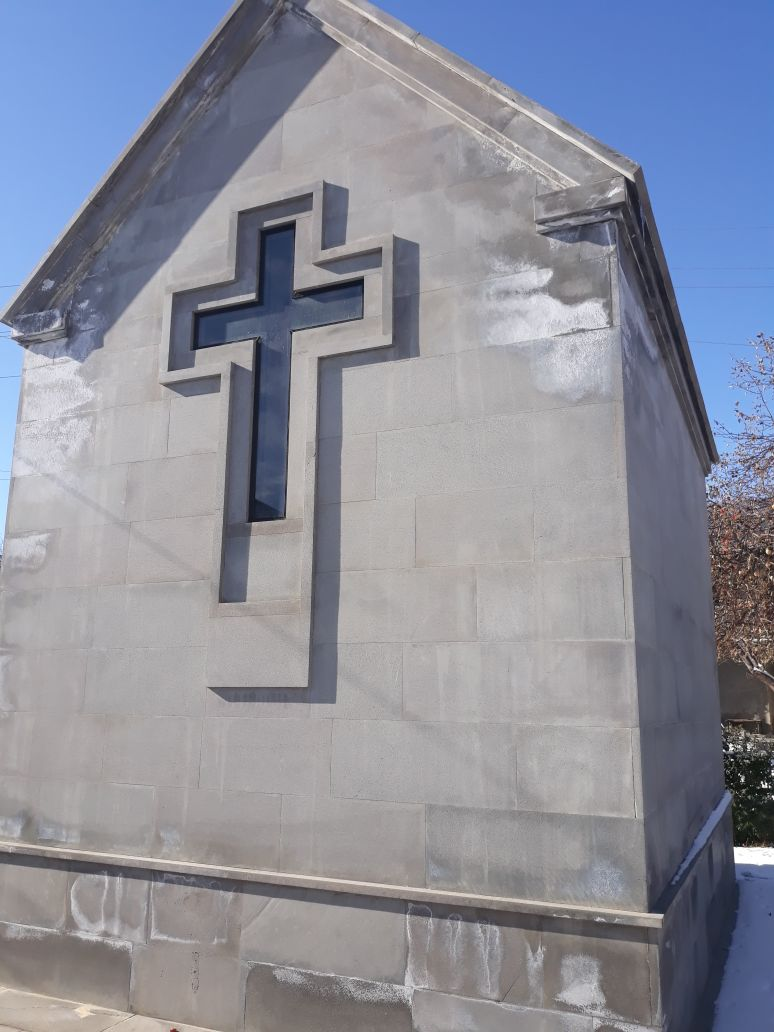
On the opposite side of St. Narek Chapel

With the initiative of philanthropist Artur Janibekyan, the construction of the St. Narek chapel was launched in 2011. The reconstruction was completed in 2012, and on 25 August of the same year the chapel's consecration ceremony took place. St. Narek is a small building 4.15 meters long, 3.10 meters wide and 4.60 meters high. The chapel has a window in form of a cross behind the sacred table. The interior surface is 7 sq. meters in size. It has a candle lighting table. In St. Narek, a wooden door with a height of 173 cm and width of 90 cm is placed, on which the Armenian cross is engraved. Inside, is an example of Grigor Narekatsi's "The Book of Lamentations" with a gilding composition.

== Tradition ==
Every year, the last Sunday of August before the liturgy in St. Hakob Church in Vardenis village, the believers' chapel, led by the spiritual class, moves to St. Narek Chapel. Only that day the Gospel of miraculous medicine published in 1710, Constantinople is moved to St. Hakob church. That day is a pilgrimage day during which believers have the opportunity to communicate with "Papé's Narek", and the St. Hakob's Church holds sacramental liturgy and sacrament.

== Interesting facts ==
In the framework of the visit of Pope Francis to Armenia in 2016, Armenian President Serzh Sargsyan presented the Pope the scale-model of the memorial statue of Grigor Narekatsi, as a pilgrim of the first Christian country and expressed hope that a great version will be placed in Vatican. The statue of Grigor Narekatsi was placed on 21 March 2018 in the Vatican Gardens by the philanthropy of Armenian Ambassador to Vatican Michael Minasyan and businessman Artur Janibekyan. Behind the monument is depicted the chapel of Saint Narek. There is a sculpture on the monument according to which, the chapel is located in Armenia, in Vardenis village of Aragatsotn province.

== See also ==
- Gregory of Narek
- Book of Lamentations
- Vardenis
