= Pekmezci, İmamoğlu =

Pekmezci
- Neighbourhood
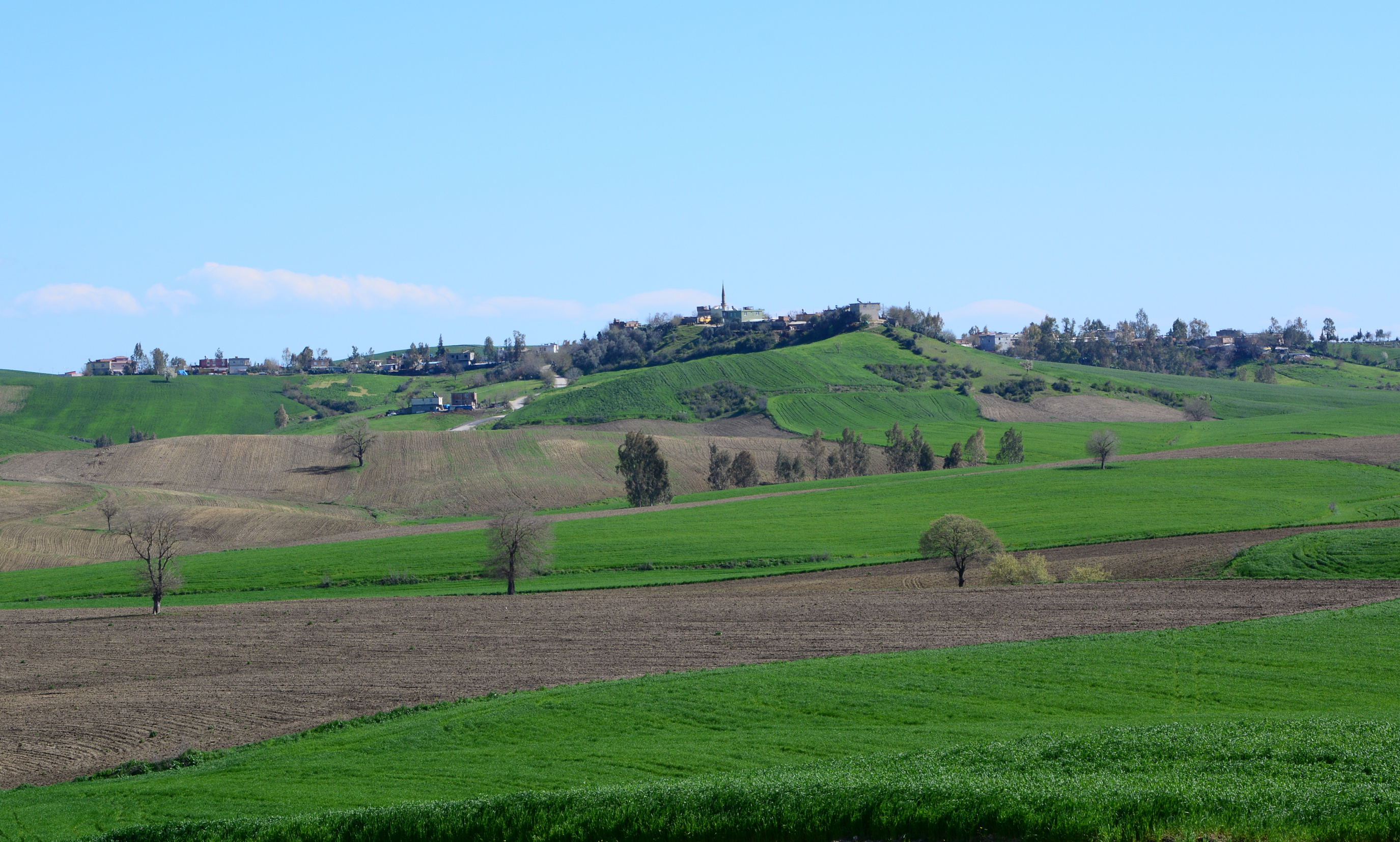

- Location within Turkey
- Coordinates: 37°14′00″N 35°29′30″E
- Country: Turkey
- Province: Adana
- District: İmamoğlu
- Population (2023): 333
- Time zone: UTC+3 (TRT)

Pekmezci is a neighbourhood in the municipality and district of İmamoğlu, Adana Province, Turkey. Its population is 333 (2023).

== History ==
Pekmezci was previously a village as an administrative unit, became a neighborhood after the legal regulation in 2012.
