= Yakutiye =

- District and municipality
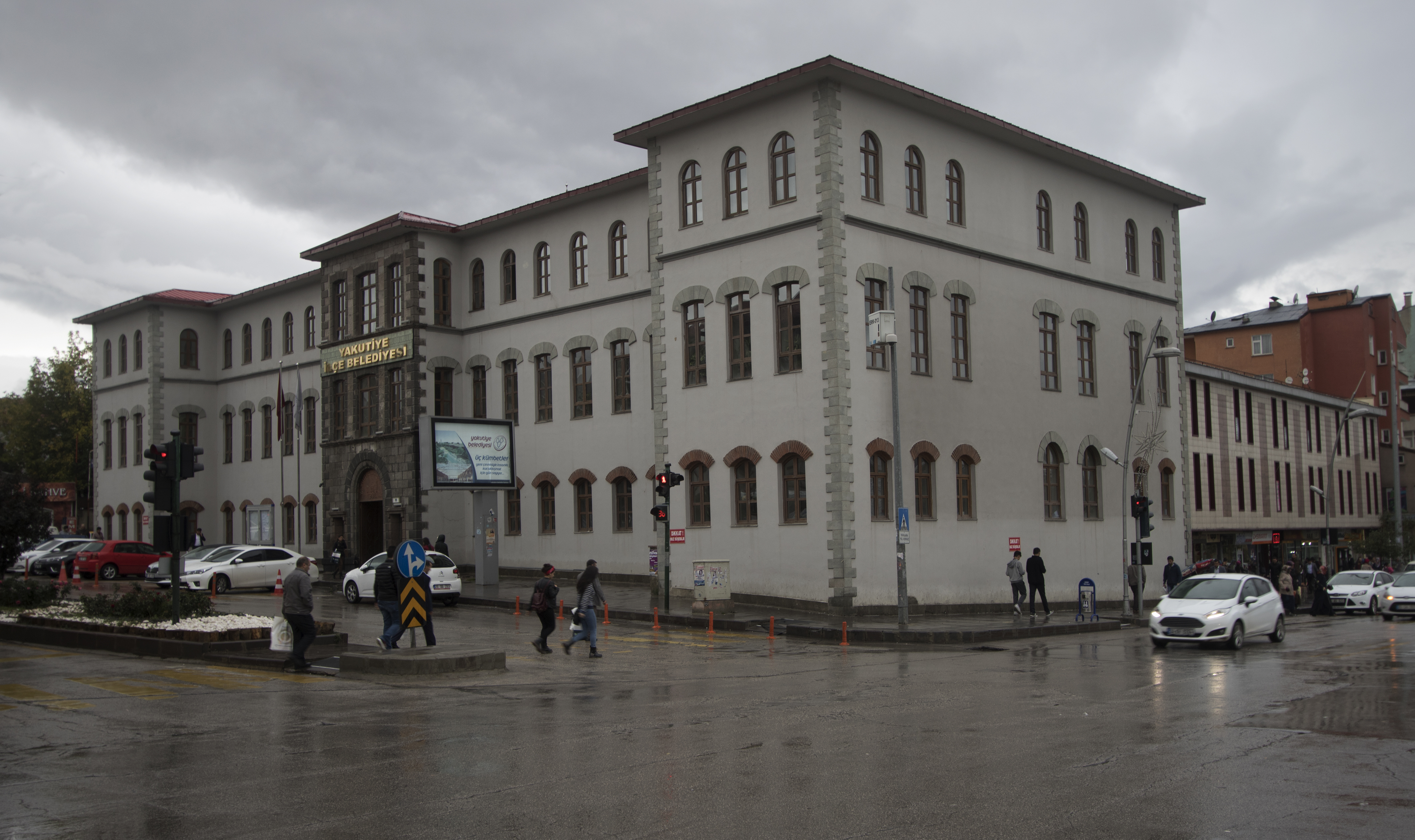

- Logo

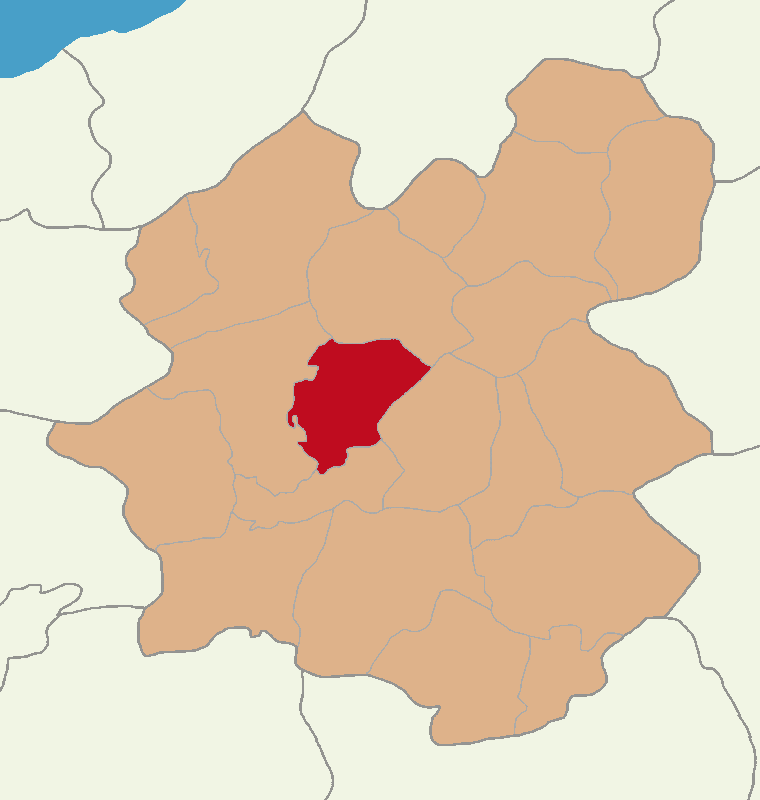
- Map showing Yakutiye District in Erzurum Province

- Location within Turkey
- Coordinates: 39°54′18″N 41°16′23″E
- Country: Turkey
- Province: Erzurum

Government
  - Mayor: Mahmut Uçar (AKP)
- Area: 945 km^{2} (365 sq mi)
- Population (2022): 190,373
  - Density: 201/km^{2} (522/sq mi)
- Time zone: UTC+3 (TRT)
- Area code: 0442
- Climate: Dfb
- Website: www.yakutiye.bel.tr

Yakutiye is a municipality and district of Erzurum Province, Turkey. Its area is 945 km^{2}, and its population is 190,373 (2022). It covers the central and northern part of the urban area of Erzurum. The district was created from part of the former central district of Erzurum in 2008.

== Geography ==
Aygır Lake is one of the lakes of Yakutiye district. It is located on Dumlu Mountain in the north.

== Composition ==
There are 44 neighbourhoods in Yakutiye District:

- Akdağ
- Aktoprak
- Altınbulak
- Altıntepe
- Arıbahçe
- Çayırca
- Çayırtepe
- Çiftlik
- Dadaşköy
- Değirmenler
- Dumlu
- Gökçeyamaç
- Gülpınar
- Güngörmez
- Güzelova
- Güzelyayla
- İbrahimhakkı
- Karagöbek
- Karasu
- Kazımkarabekirpaşa
- Kırkgöze
- Kırmızıtaş
- Köse Mehmet
- Köşkköy
- Kurtuluş
- Lala Paşa
- Mülk
- Muratgeldi
- Muratpaşa
- Ömer Nasuhi Bilmen
- Ortadüzü
- Rabia Ana
- Şenyurt
- Soğukçermik
- Söğütyanı
- Şükrüpaşa
- Umudum
- Üniversite
- Uzunyayla
- Yazıpınar
- Yerlisu
- Yeşildere
- Yeşilova
- Yeşilyayla
