= Eşkinkaya, Aziziye =

Village in Turkey

Eşkinkaya
- Neighbourhood
- Location within Turkey
- Country: Turkey
- Province: Erzurum
- District: Aziziye
- Population (2022): 80
- Time zone: UTC+3 (TRT)

Eşkinkaya is a neighbourhood in the municipality and district of Aziziye, Erzurum Province in Turkey. Its population is 80 (2022).
