= Eskipolat, Aziziye =

Village in Turkey

Eskipolat
- Neighbourhood
- Location in Turkey
- Coordinates: 40°04′23″N 40°56′00″E
- Country: Turkey
- Province: Erzurum
- District: Aziziye
- Population (2022): 452
- Time zone: UTC+3 (TRT)

Eskipolat is a neighbourhood in the municipality and district of Aziziye, Erzurum Province in Turkey. Its population is 452 (2022).
