= Ilıca, Erzurum =

Ilıca
- Neighbourhood
- Location in Turkey
- Coordinates: 39°56′45″N 41°06′19″E
- Country: Turkey
- Province: Erzurum
- District: Aziziye
- Population (2022): 8,386
- Time zone: UTC+3 (TRT)
- Postal code: 25700

Ilıca is a neighbourhood in the municipality and district of Aziziye, Erzurum Province in Turkey. Its population is 8,386 (2022). A formerly independent municipality, it was merged with the former municipality Dadaşkent to form the new municipality Aziziye in 2008.
