= Ağcakent, Aziziye =

Village in Turkey

Ağcakent
- Neighbourhood
- Location in Turkey
- Coordinates: 40°9′50″N 41°2′26″E
- Country: Turkey
- Province: Erzurum
- District: Aziziye

Government
  - Muhtar: Recep Aydin
- Population (2022): 49
- Time zone: UTC+3 (TRT)

Ağcakent is a neighbourhood in the municipality and district of Aziziye, Erzurum Province in Turkey. Its population is 49 (2022).

As of 2023, the muhtar (village head) of Ağcakent is Recep Aydin.
