= Saygeçit, İmamoğlu =

Saygeçit
- Neighbourhood
- Location in Turkey
- Coordinates: 37°15′N 35°38′E
- Country: Turkey
- Province: Adana
- District: İmamoğlu
- Population (2022): 1,111
- Time zone: UTC+3 (TRT)

Saygeçit is a neighbourhood in the municipality and district of İmamoğlu, Adana Province, Turkey. Its population is 1,111 (2022).

== Gallery ==
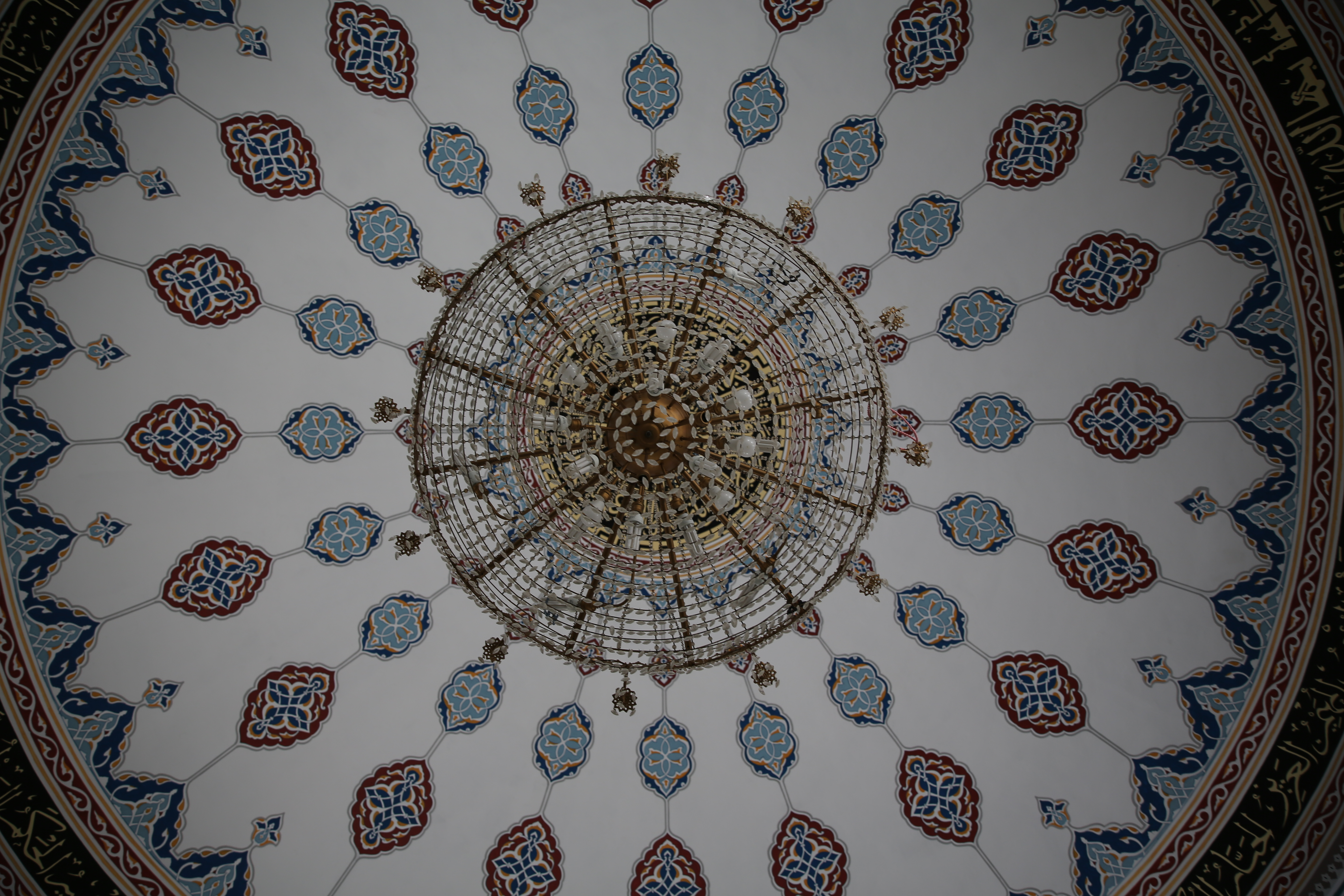
Saygeçit Mosque

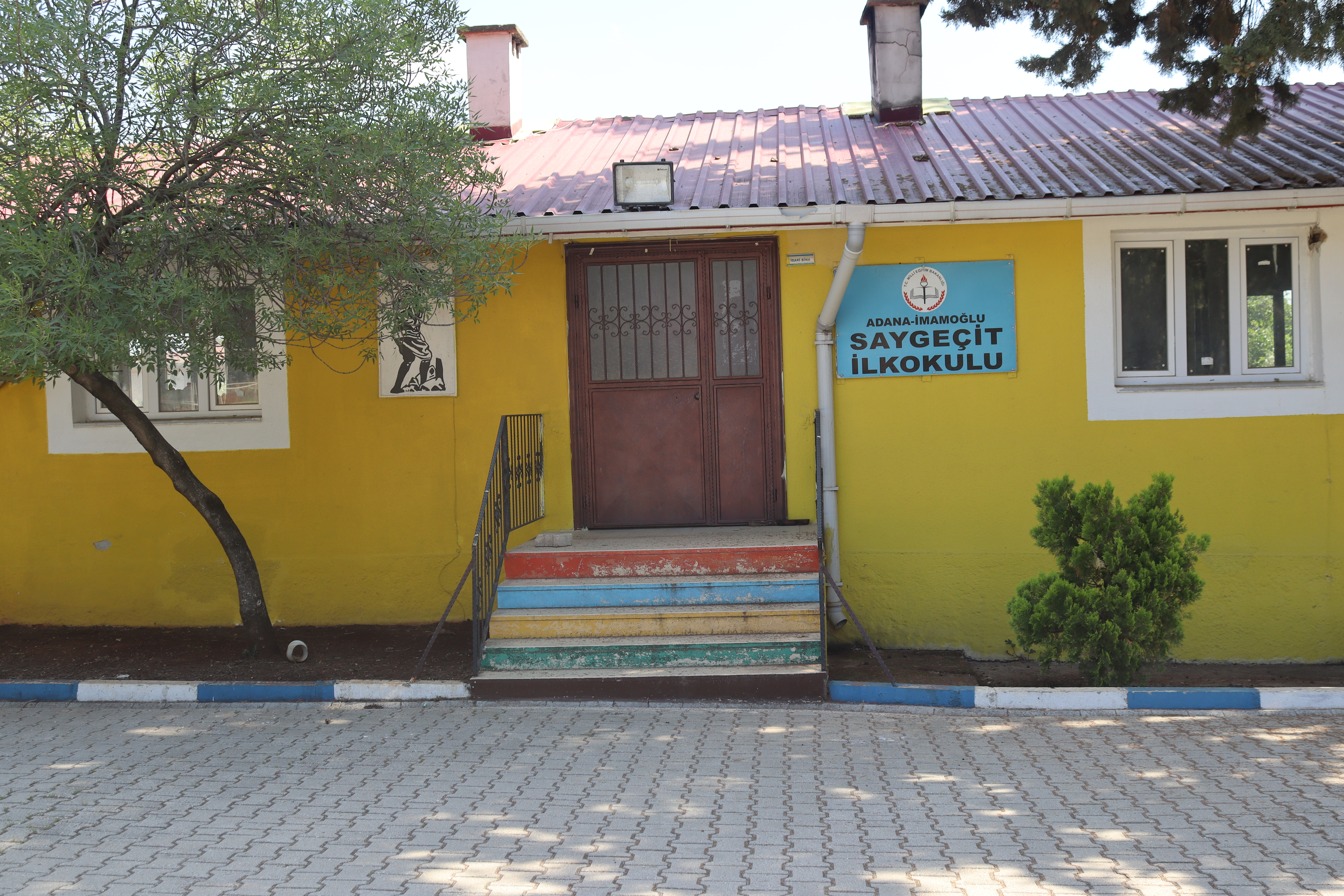
Saygeçit primary school

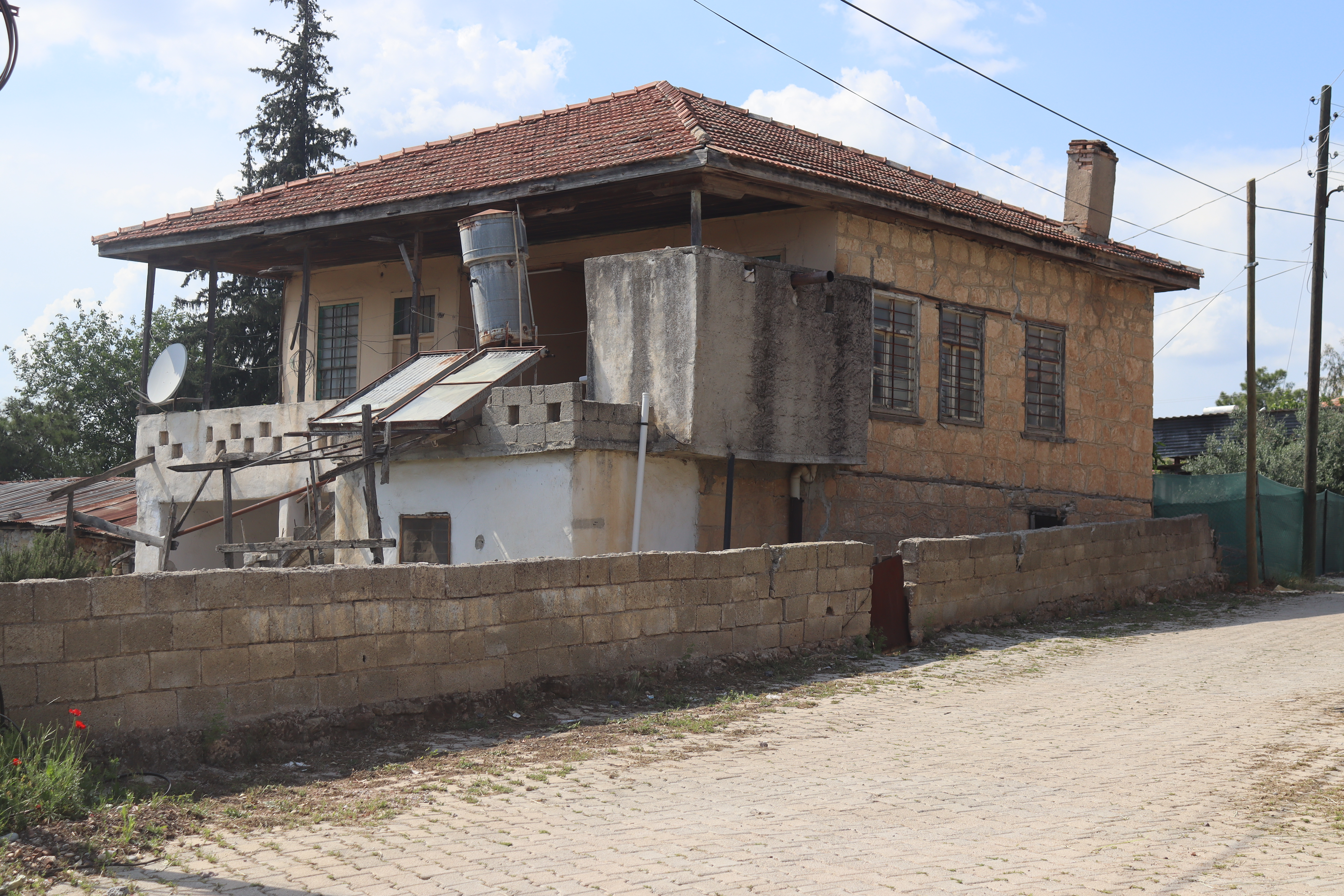
Village house

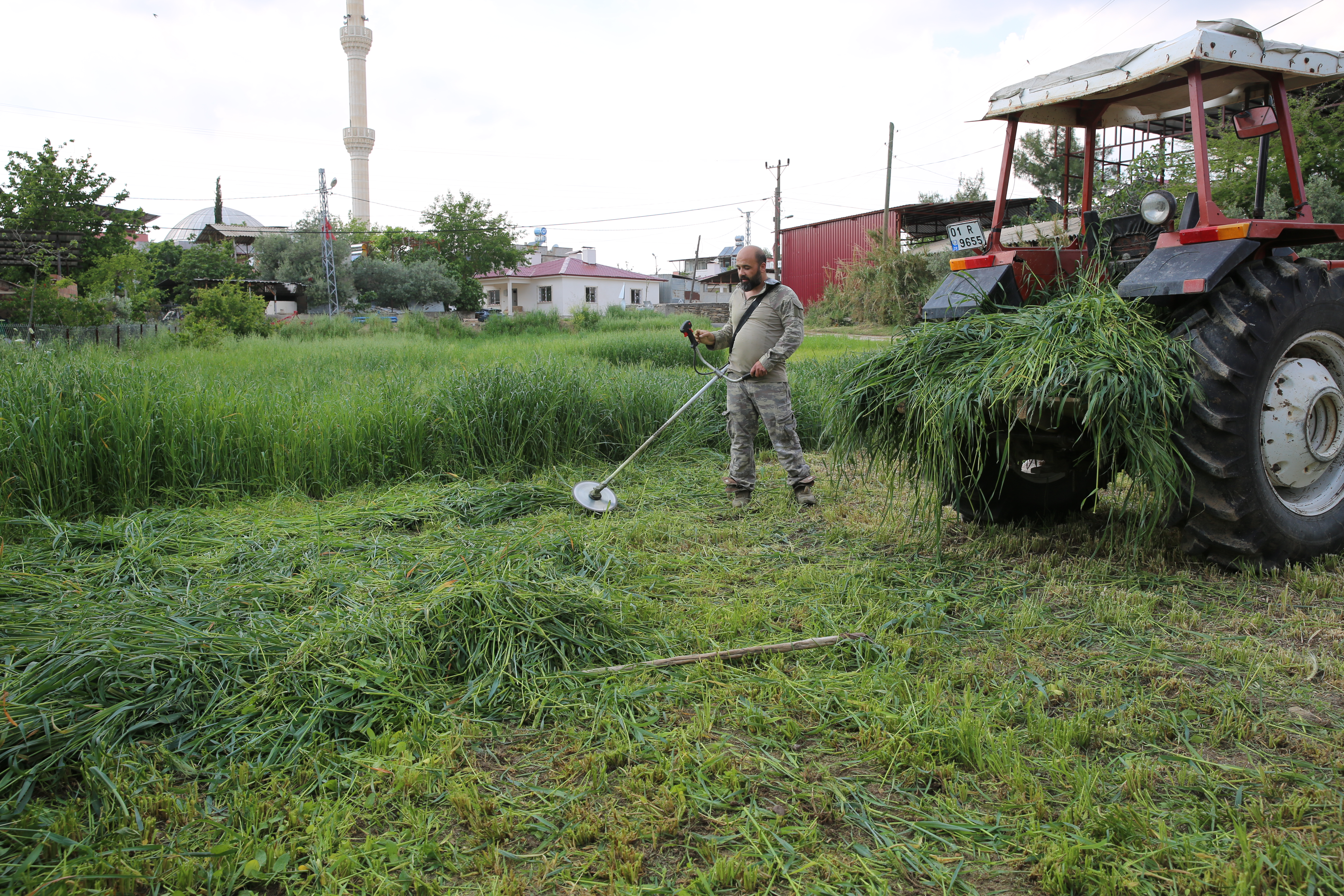
A villager
