= Sakalıkesik, Aziziye =

Village in Turkey

Sakalıkesik
- Neighbourhood
- Location in Turkey
- Coordinates: 39°50′31″N 41°06′02″E
- Country: Turkey
- Province: Erzurum
- District: Aziziye
- Population (2022): 163
- Time zone: UTC+3 (TRT)

Sakalıkesik is a neighbourhood in the municipality and district of Aziziye, Erzurum Province in Turkey. Its population is 163 (2022).
