= Kumluyazı, Aziziye =

Village in Turkey

Kumluyazı
- Neighbourhood
- Country: Turkey
- Province: Erzurum
- District: Aziziye
- Population (2022): 332
- Time zone: UTC+3 (TRT)

Kumluyazı is a neighbourhood in the municipality and district of Aziziye, Erzurum Province in Turkey. Its population is 332 (2022).
