= Camili, İmamoğlu =

Camili
- Neighbourhood
- Location in Turkey
- Coordinates: 37.3363°N 35.6130°E
- Country: Turkey
- Province: Adana
- District: İmamoğlu
- Population (2022): 946
- Time zone: UTC+3 (TRT)

Camili is a neighbourhood in the municipality and district of İmamoğlu, Adana Province, Turkey. Its population is 946 (2022).
