= Akdağ, Aziziye =

Village in Turkey

Akdağ
- Neighbourhood
- Location in Turkey
- Coordinates: 40°15′9″N 40°56′42″E
- Country: Turkey
- Province: Erzurum
- District: Aziziye
- Population (2022): 93
- Time zone: UTC+3 (TRT)

Akdağ is a neighbourhood in the municipality and district of Aziziye, Erzurum Province in Turkey. Its population is 93 (2022).
