= Danacılı, İmamoğlu =

Danacılı
- Neighbourhood
- Location in Turkey
- Coordinates: 37°15′N 35°41′E
- Country: Turkey
- Province: Adana
- District: İmamoğlu
- Population (2022): 310
- Time zone: UTC+3 (TRT)

Danacılı is a neighbourhood in the municipality and district of İmamoğlu, Adana Province, Turkey. Its population is 310 (2022).
