= Rizekent, Aziziye =

Village in Turkey

Rizekent
- Neighbourhood
- Location in Turkey
- Coordinates: 40°10′N 41°00′E
- Country: Turkey
- Province: Erzurum
- District: Aziziye
- Population (2022): 160
- Time zone: UTC+3 (TRT)

Rizekent is a neighbourhood in the municipality and district of Aziziye, Erzurum Province in Turkey. Its population is 160 (2022).
