= Paşayurdu, Aziziye =

Village in Turkey

Paşayurdu
- Neighbourhood
- Location in Turkey
- Coordinates: 39°59′32″N 41°0′42″E
- Country: Turkey
- Province: Erzurum
- District: Aziziye
- Population (2022): 220
- Time zone: UTC+3 (TRT)

Paşayurdu is a neighbourhood in the municipality and district of Aziziye, Erzurum Province in Turkey. Its population is 220 (2022).
