= Yukarıcanören, Aziziye =

Village in Turkey

Yukarıcanören
- Neighbourhood
- Location in Turkey
- Coordinates: 40°08′03″N 40°51′00″E
- Country: Turkey
- Province: Erzurum
- District: Aziziye
- Population (2022): 305
- Time zone: UTC+3 (TRT)

Yukarıcanören is a neighbourhood in the municipality and district of Aziziye, Erzurum Province in Turkey. Its population is 305 (2022).
