= Üçtepe, İmamoğlu =

Üçtepe
- Neighbourhood
- Location in Turkey
- Coordinates: 37°22′24″N 35°29′15″E
- Country: Turkey
- Province: Adana
- District: İmamoğlu
- Population (2022): 735
- Time zone: UTC+3 (TRT)

Üçtepe is a neighbourhood in the municipality and district of İmamoğlu, Adana Province, Turkey. Its population is 735 (2022).
