= Halilkaya, Aziziye =

Village in Turkey

Halilkaya
- Neighbourhood
- Location in Turkey
- Coordinates: 40°05′24″N 40°41′25″E
- Country: Turkey
- Province: Erzurum
- District: Aziziye
- Population (2022): 75
- Time zone: UTC+3 (TRT)

Halilkaya is a neighbourhood in the municipality and district of Aziziye, Erzurum Province in Turkey. Its population is 75 (2022).
