= Atlıkonak, Aziziye =

Village in Turkey

Atlıkonak
- Neighbourhood
- Location in Turkey
- Coordinates: 39°55′12″N 40°56′17″E
- Country: Turkey
- Province: Erzurum
- District: Aziziye
- Population (2022): 197
- Time zone: UTC+3 (TRT)

Atlıkonak is a neighbourhood in the municipality and district of Aziziye, Erzurum Province in Turkey. Its population is 197 (2022).
