= Kapılı, Aziziye =

Village in Turkey

Kapılı
- Neighbourhood
- Country: Turkey
- Province: Erzurum
- District: Aziziye
- Population (2022): 119
- Time zone: UTC+3 (TRT)

Kapılı is a neighbourhood in the municipality and district of Aziziye, Erzurum Province in Turkey. Its population is 119 (2022).
