= Hacıhasanlı, İmamoğlu =

Hacıhasanlı
- Neighbourhood
- Location in Turkey
- Coordinates: 37.30551°N 35.57437°E
- Country: Turkey
- Province: Adana
- District: İmamoğlu
- Population (2022): 188
- Time zone: UTC+3 (TRT)

Hacıhasanlı is a neighborhood in the municipality and district of İmamoğlu, Adana Province, Turkey. Its population is 188 (2022).
