= Aliler, İmamoğlu =

Aliler
- Neighbourhood
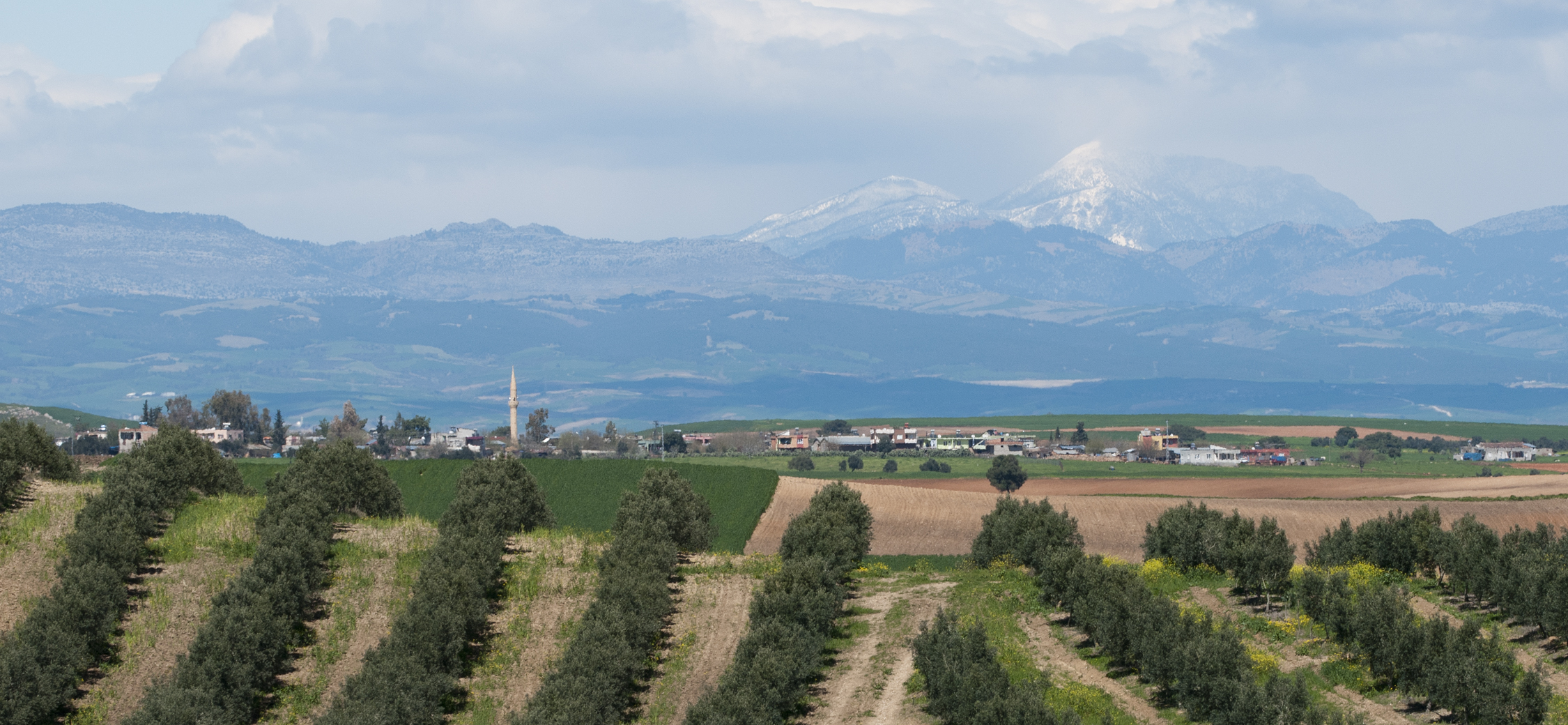

- Location within Turkey
- Coordinates: 37.2254°N 35.5800°E
- Country: Turkey
- Province: Adana
- District: İmamoğlu
- Population (2022): 337
- Time zone: UTC+3 (TRT)

Aliler (formerly: Faydalı) is a neighbourhood in the municipality and district of İmamoğlu, Adana Province, Turkey. Its population is 337 (2022).
