= Yazıtepe, İmamoğlu =

Yazıtepe
- Neighbourhood
- Location in Turkey
- Coordinates: 37.2895°N 35.6416°E
- Country: Turkey
- Province: Adana
- District: İmamoğlu
- Population (2022): 441
- Time zone: UTC+3 (TRT)

Yazıtepe is a neighbourhood in the municipality and district of İmamoğlu, Adana Province, Turkey. Its population is 441 (2022).
