= Malıhıdırlı, İmamoğlu =

Malıhıdırlı
- Neighbourhood
- Location in Turkey
- Coordinates: 37°15′N 35°26′E
- Country: Turkey
- Province: Adana
- District: İmamoğlu
- Population (2022): 563
- Time zone: UTC+3 (TRT)

Malıhıdırlı is a neighbourhood in the municipality and district of İmamoğlu, Adana Province, Turkey. Its population is 563 (2022).
