= Sokutaş, İmamoğlu =

Sokutaş
- Neighbourhood
- Country: Turkey
- Province: Adana
- District: İmamoğlu
- Population (2022): 223
- Time zone: UTC+3 (TRT)

Sokutaş is a neighbourhood in the municipality and district of İmamoğlu, Adana Province, Turkey. Its population is 223 (2022).
