= Aziziye =

- District and municipality
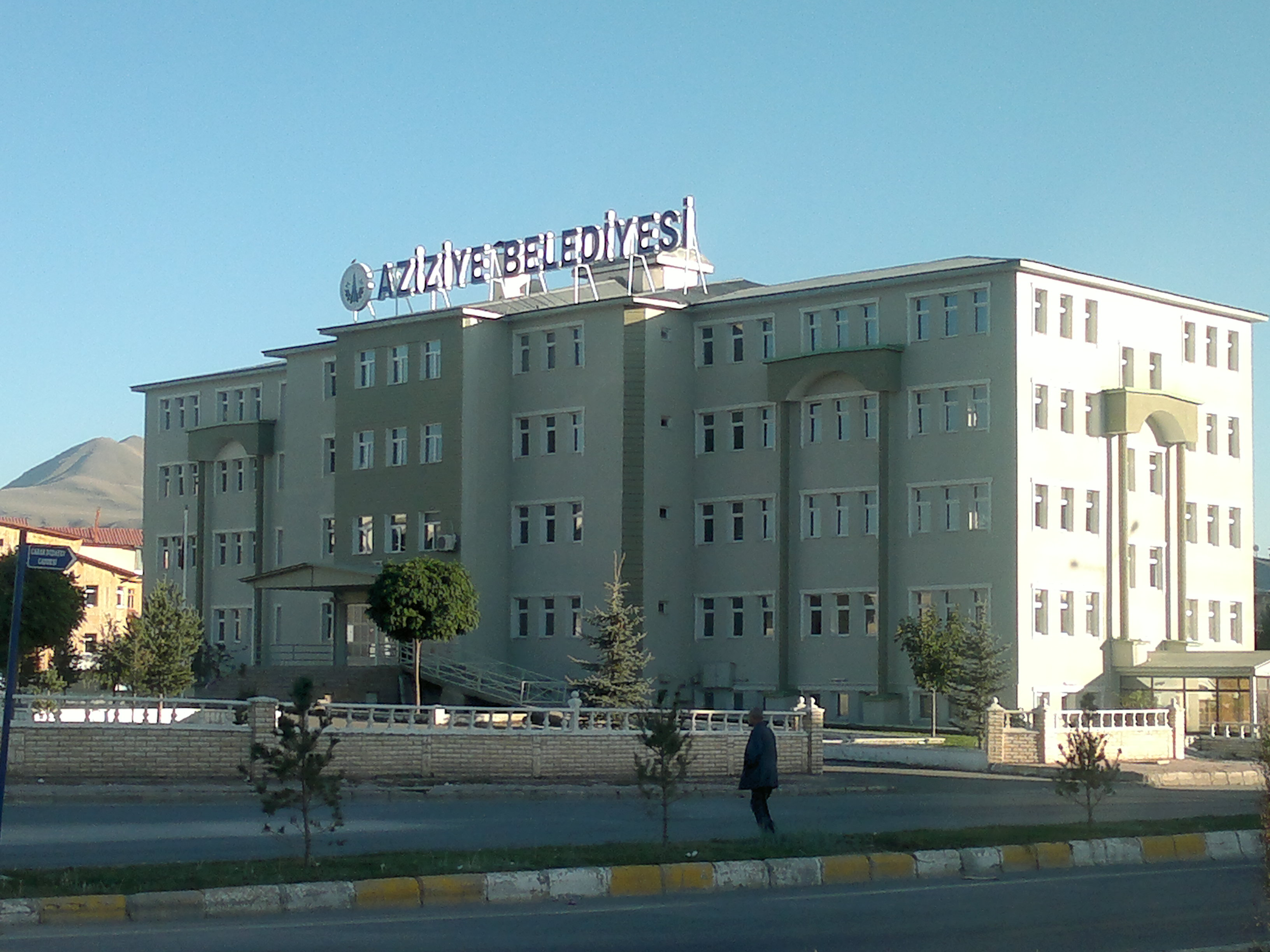

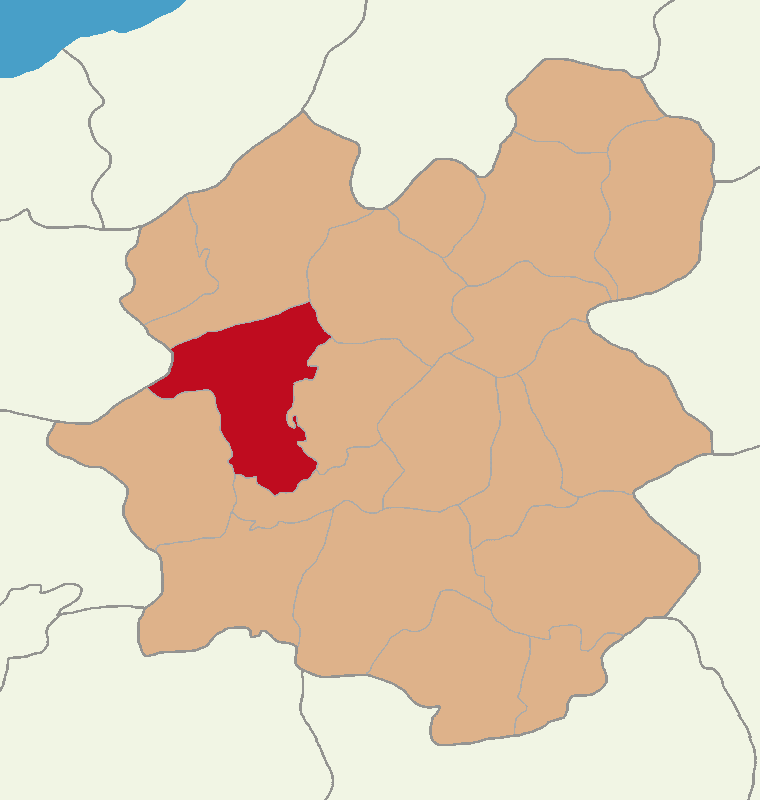
- Map showing Aziziye District in Erzurum Province

- Location within Turkey
- Coordinates: 39°57′N 41°06′E
- Country: Turkey
- Province: Erzurum

Government
  - Mayor: Emrullah Akpunar (AKP)
- Area: 1,529 km^{2} (590 sq mi)
- Elevation: 1,760 m (5,770 ft)
- Population (2022): 65,553
  - Density: 42.87/km^{2} (111.0/sq mi)
- Time zone: UTC+3 (TRT)
- Postal code: 25700
- Area code: 0442
- Climate: Dfb

Aziziye is a municipality and district of Erzurum Province, Turkey. Its area is 1,529 km^{2}, and its population is 65,553 (2022).

The district was established as Ilıca District in 1990, with its centre at Ilıca. It was expanded with the former municipality Dadaşkent and renamed to Aziziye in 2008. Aziziye lies in the western part of the urban area of Erzurum. The district center is famous for thermal springs (39.4 °C).

== Composition ==
There are 71 neighbourhoods in Aziziye District:

- Adaçay
- Ağcakent
- Ağören
- Ahırcık
- Akdağ
- Akyazı
- Alaca
- Alaybeyi
- Aşağıcanören
- Aşağıyenice
- Atlıkonak
- Aynalıkale
- Başçakmak
- Başkent
- Başkurtdere
- Başovacık
- Beypınarı
- Bingöze
- Çamlıca
- Çatak
- Çavdarlı
- Çavuşoğlu
- Çiğdemli
- Çıkrıklı
- Dağdagül
- Demirgeçit
- Düztoprak
- Eğerti
- Elmalı
- Emrecik
- Eşkinkaya
- Eskipolat
- Gelinkaya
- Geyik
- Güllüce
- Halilkaya
- Ilıca
- Kabaktepe
- Kahramanlar
- Kapılı
- Karakale
- Kavaklıdere
- Kayapa
- Kızılkale
- Kumluyazı
- Kuşçu
- Kuzgun
- Kuzuluk
- Ocak
- Ömertepe
- Özbek
- Özbilen
- Paşayurdu
- Rizekent
- Sakalıkesik
- Saltuklu
- Sarıyazla
- Selçuklu
- Sırlı
- Söğütlü
- Sorkunlu
- Taşpınar
- Tebrizcik
- Tınazlı
- Toprakkale
- Üçköşe
- Yarımca
- Yeşilova
- Yeşilvadi
- Yoncalık
- Yukarıcanören
