= Ahırcık, Aziziye =

Village in Turkey

Ahırcık
- Neighbourhood
- Location in Turkey
- Coordinates: 40°17′14″N 41°7′43″E
- Country: Turkey
- Province: Erzurum
- District: Aziziye
- Population (2022): 67
- Time zone: UTC+3 (TRT)

Ahırcık is a neighbourhood in the municipality and district of Aziziye, Erzurum Province in Turkey. Its population is 67 (2022).
