= Adaçay, Aziziye =

Village in Turkey

Adaçay
- Neighbourhood
- Location in Turkey
- Coordinates: 39°52′19″N 41°07′33″E
- Country: Turkey
- Province: Erzurum
- District: Aziziye
- Population (2022): 151
- Time zone: UTC+3 (TRT)

Adaçay is a neighbourhood in the municipality and district of Aziziye, Erzurum Province in Turkey. Its population is 151 (2022).
