= Düztoprak, Aziziye =

Village in Turkey

Düztoprak
- Neighbourhood
- Location in Turkey
- Coordinates: 40°01′24″N 41°08′00″E
- Country: Turkey
- Province: Erzurum
- District: Aziziye
- Population (2022): 44
- Time zone: UTC+3 (TRT)

Düztoprak is a neighbourhood in the municipality and district of Aziziye, Erzurum Province in Turkey. Its population is 44 (2022).
