= Geyik, Aziziye =

Village in Turkey

Geyik
- Neighbourhood
- Location in Turkey
- Coordinates: 40°10′N 40°45′E
- Country: Turkey
- Province: Erzurum
- District: Aziziye
- Population (2022): 139
- Time zone: UTC+3 (TRT)

Geyik is a neighbourhood in the municipality and district of Aziziye, Erzurum Province in Turkey. Its population is 139 (2022).
