= Ağzıkaraca, İmamoğlu =

Ağzıkaraca
- Neighbourhood
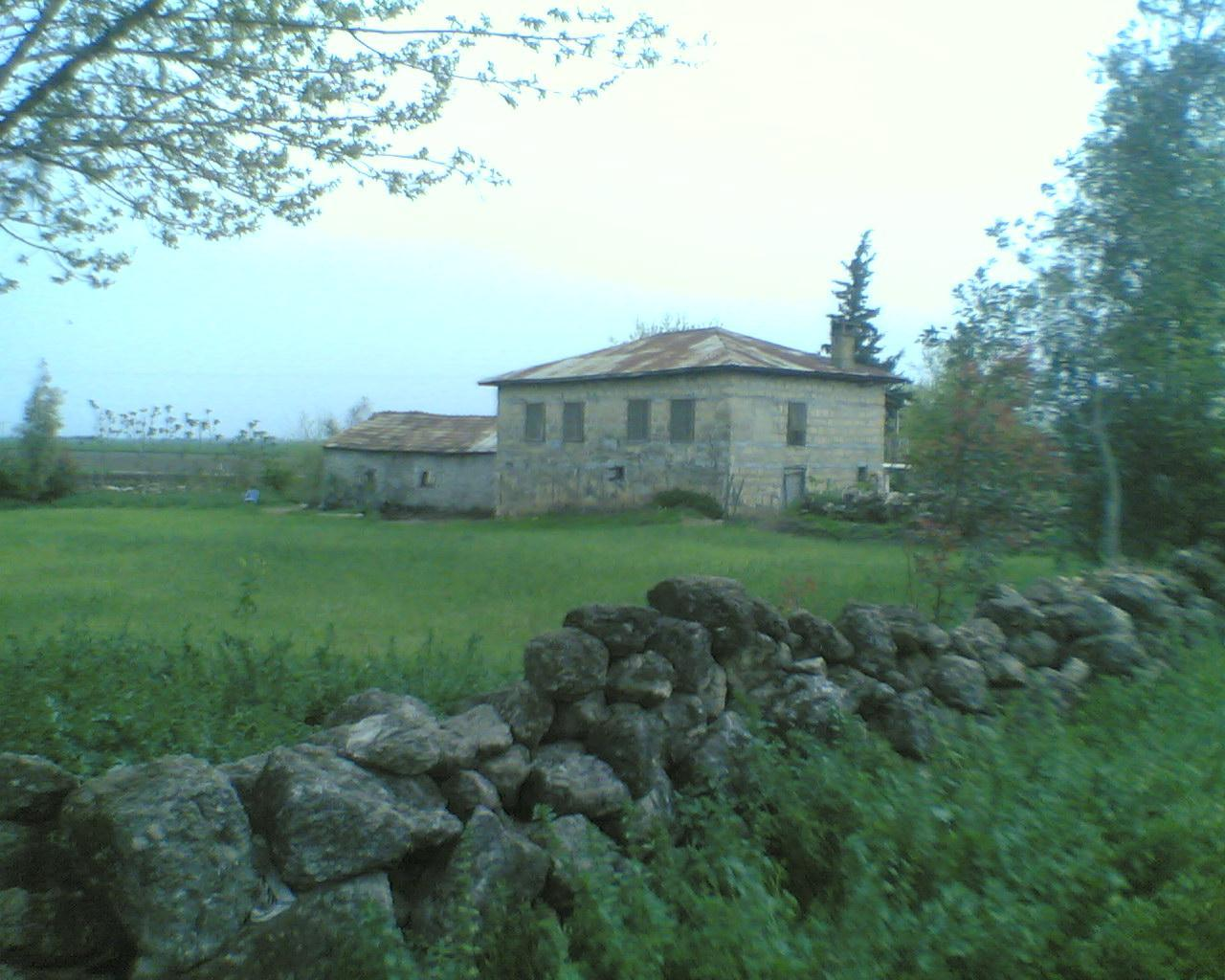

- Location within Turkey
- Coordinates: 37°19′N 35°41′E
- Country: Turkey
- Province: Adana
- District: İmamoğlu
- Population (2022): 269
- Time zone: UTC+3 (TRT)

Ağzıkaraca is a neighbourhood in the municipality and district of İmamoğlu, Adana Province, Turkey. Its population is 269 (2022).
