= Rzalar =

- Location within Azerbaijan Location within Karabakh Economic Region
- Coordinates: 40°02′N 47°04′E
- Country: Azerbaijan
- Rayon: Agdam
- Municipality: Qaradağlı
- Time zone: UTC+4 (AZT)
  - Summer (DST): UTC+5 (AZT)

Rzalar (also, Rizalar) is a village in the Agdam Rayon of Azerbaijan. The village forms part of the municipality of Qaradağlı.
