= Özbilen, Aziziye =

Village in Turkey

Özbilen
- Neighbourhood
- Location in Turkey
- Coordinates: 40°01′11″N 41°05′30″E
- Country: Turkey
- Province: Erzurum
- District: Aziziye
- Population (2022): 87
- Time zone: UTC+3 (TRT)

Özbilen is a neighbourhood in the municipality and district of Aziziye, Erzurum Province in Turkey. Its population is 87 (2022).
