= Akyazı, Aziziye =

Village in Turkey

Akyazı
- Neighbourhood
- Location in Turkey
- Coordinates: 40°7′41″N 40°42′51″E
- Country: Turkey
- Province: Erzurum
- District: Aziziye
- Population (2022): 112
- Time zone: UTC+3 (TRT)

Akyazı is a neighbourhood in the municipality and district of Aziziye, Erzurum Province in Turkey. Its population is 112 (2022).
