= Emrecik, Aziziye =

Village in Turkey

Emrecik
- Neighbourhood
- Location in Turkey
- Coordinates: 40°01′N 40°59′E
- Country: Turkey
- Province: Erzurum
- District: Aziziye
- Population (2022): 269
- Time zone: UTC+3 (TRT)

Emrecik is a neighbourhood in the municipality and district of Aziziye, Erzurum Province in Turkey. Its population is 269 (2022).
