= Başçakmak, Aziziye =

Village in Turkey

Başçakmak
- Neighbourhood
- Location in Turkey
- Coordinates: 40°00′19″N 40°53′03″E
- Country: Turkey
- Province: Erzurum
- District: Aziziye
- Population (2022): 675
- Time zone: UTC+3 (TRT)

Başçakmak is a neighbourhood in the municipality and district of Aziziye, Erzurum Province in Turkey. Its population is 675 (2022).
