= Başkurtdere, Aziziye =

Village in Turkey

Başkurtdere
- Neighbourhood
- Location in Turkey
- Coordinates: 40°12′41″N 40°51′04″E
- Country: Turkey
- Province: Erzurum
- District: Aziziye
- Population (2022): 172
- Time zone: UTC+3 (TRT)

Başkurtdere is a neighbourhood in the municipality and district of Aziziye, Erzurum Province in Turkey. Its population is 172 (2022).
