= Çıkrıklı, Aziziye =

Village in Turkey

Çıkrıklı
- Neighbourhood
- Location in Turkey
- Coordinates: 40°09′13″N 40°57′16″E
- Country: Turkey
- Province: Erzurum
- District: Aziziye
- Population (2022): 66
- Time zone: UTC+3 (TRT)

Çıkrıklı is a neighbourhood in the municipality and district of Aziziye, Erzurum Province in Turkey. Its population is 66 (2022).
