= Demirgeçit, Aziziye =

Village in Turkey

Demirgeçit
- Neighbourhood
- Location in Turkey
- Coordinates: 39°57′08″N 41°02′13″E
- Country: Turkey
- Province: Erzurum
- District: Aziziye
- Population (2022): 272
- Time zone: UTC+3 (TRT)

Demirgeçit is a neighbourhood in the municipality and district of Aziziye, Erzurum Province in Turkey. Its population is 272 (2022).
