= Özbek, Aziziye =

Village in Turkey

Özbek
- Neighbourhood
- Country: Turkey
- Province: Erzurum
- District: Aziziye
- Population (2022): 189
- Time zone: UTC+3 (TRT)

Özbek is a neighbourhood in the municipality and district of Aziziye, Erzurum Province in Turkey. Its population is 189 (2022).
