= Aşağıcanören, Aziziye =

Village in Turkey

Aşağıcanören
- Neighbourhood
- Location in Turkey
- Coordinates: 40.1175°N 40.7461°E
- Country: Turkey
- Province: Erzurum
- District: Aziziye
- Population (2022): 105
- Time zone: UTC+3 (TRT)

Aşağıcanören is a neighbourhood in the municipality and district of Aziziye, Erzurum Province in Turkey. Its population is 105 (2022).
