= Aynalıkale, Aziziye =

Village in Turkey

Aynalıkale
- Neighbourhood
- Location in Turkey
- Coordinates: 40°12′09″N 41°01′20″E
- Country: Turkey
- Province: Erzurum
- District: Aziziye
- Population (2022): 33
- Time zone: UTC+3 (TRT)

Aynalıkale is a neighbourhood in the municipality and district of Aziziye, Erzurum Province in Turkey. Its population is 33 (2022).
