= Sarıyazla, Aziziye =

Village in Turkey

Sarıyazla
- Neighbourhood
- Location in Turkey
- Coordinates: 40°01′13″N 41°04′18″E
- Country: Turkey
- Province: Erzurum
- District: Aziziye
- Population (2022): 143
- Time zone: UTC+3 (TRT)

Sarıyazla is a neighbourhood in the municipality and district of Aziziye, Erzurum Province in Turkey. Its population is 143 (2022).
