= Ömertepe, Aziziye =

Village in Turkey

Ömertepe
- Neighbourhood
- Location in Turkey
- Coordinates: 39°54′22″N 41°07′49″E
- Country: Turkey
- Province: Erzurum
- District: Aziziye
- Population (2022): 239
- Time zone: UTC+3 (TRT)

Ömertepe is a neighbourhood in the municipality and district of Aziziye, Erzurum Province in Turkey. Its population is 239 (2022).
