= Ağören, Aziziye =

Village in Turkey

Ağören
- Neighbourhood
- Location in Turkey
- Coordinates: 39°54′58″N 41°6′29″E
- Country: Turkey
- Province: Erzurum
- District: Aziziye
- Population (2022): 287
- Time zone: UTC+3 (TRT)

Ağören is a neighbourhood in the municipality and district of Aziziye, Erzurum Province in Turkey. Its population is 287 (2022).
