= Dağdagül, Aziziye =

Village in Turkey

Dağdagül
- Neighbourhood
- Location in Turkey
- Coordinates: 40°03′N 41°03′E
- Country: Turkey
- Province: Erzurum
- District: Aziziye
- Population (2022): 174
- Time zone: UTC+3 (TRT)

Dağdagül is a neighbourhood in the municipality and district of Aziziye, Erzurum Province in Turkey. Its population is 174 (2022).
