= Sayca, İmamoğlu =

Sayca
- Neighbourhood
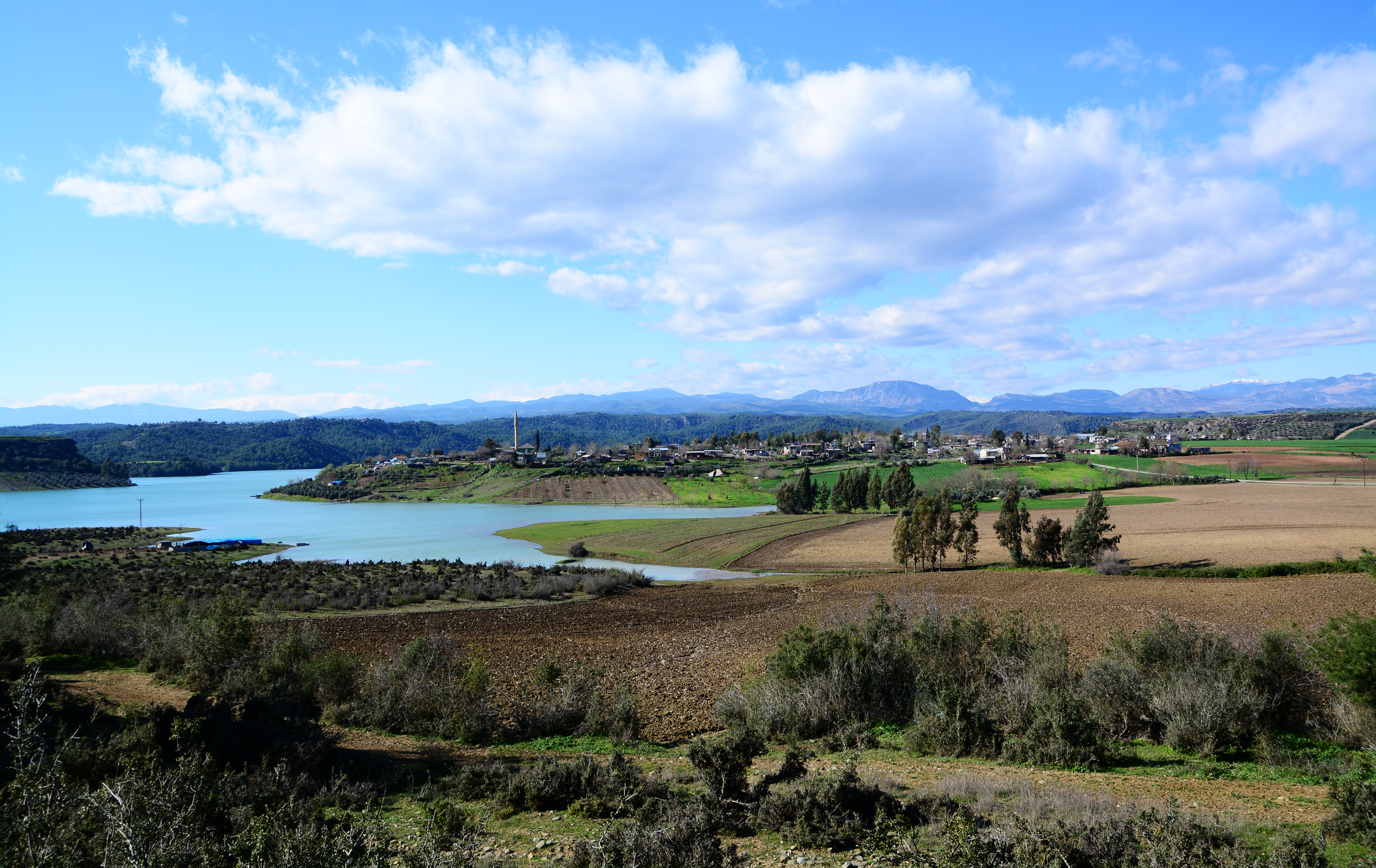

- Location within Turkey
- Coordinates: 37.2896°N 35.4476°E
- Country: Turkey
- Province: Adana
- District: İmamoğlu
- Population (2022): 312
- Time zone: UTC+3 (TRT)

Sayca is a neighbourhood in the municipality and district of İmamoğlu, Adana Province, Turkey. Its population is 312 (2022).
