= Ayvalı, İmamoğlu =

Ayvalı
- Neighbourhood
- Location in Turkey
- Coordinates: 37.29310°N 35.73659°E
- Country: Turkey
- Province: Adana
- District: İmamoğlu
- Population (2022): 433
- Time zone: UTC+3 (TRT)

Ayvalı is a neighbourhood in the municipality and district of İmamoğlu, Adana Province, Turkey. Its population is 433 (2022).
