= Ufacıkören, İmamoğlu =

Ufacıkören
- Neighbourhood
- Location in Turkey
- Coordinates: 37°20′N 35°44′E
- Country: Turkey
- Province: Adana
- District: İmamoğlu
- Population (2022): 338
- Time zone: UTC+3 (TRT)

Ufacıkören is a neighbourhood in the municipality and district of İmamoğlu, Adana Province, Turkey. Its population is 338 (2022).
