= Çörten, İmamoğlu =

Çörten
- Neighbourhood
- Location in Turkey
- Coordinates: 37.2651°N 35.4960°E
- Country: Turkey
- Province: Adana
- District: İmamoğlu
- Population (2022): 390
- Time zone: UTC+3 (TRT)

Çörten is a neighbourhood in the municipality and district of İmamoğlu, Adana Province, Turkey. Its population is 390 (2022).

== Gallery ==
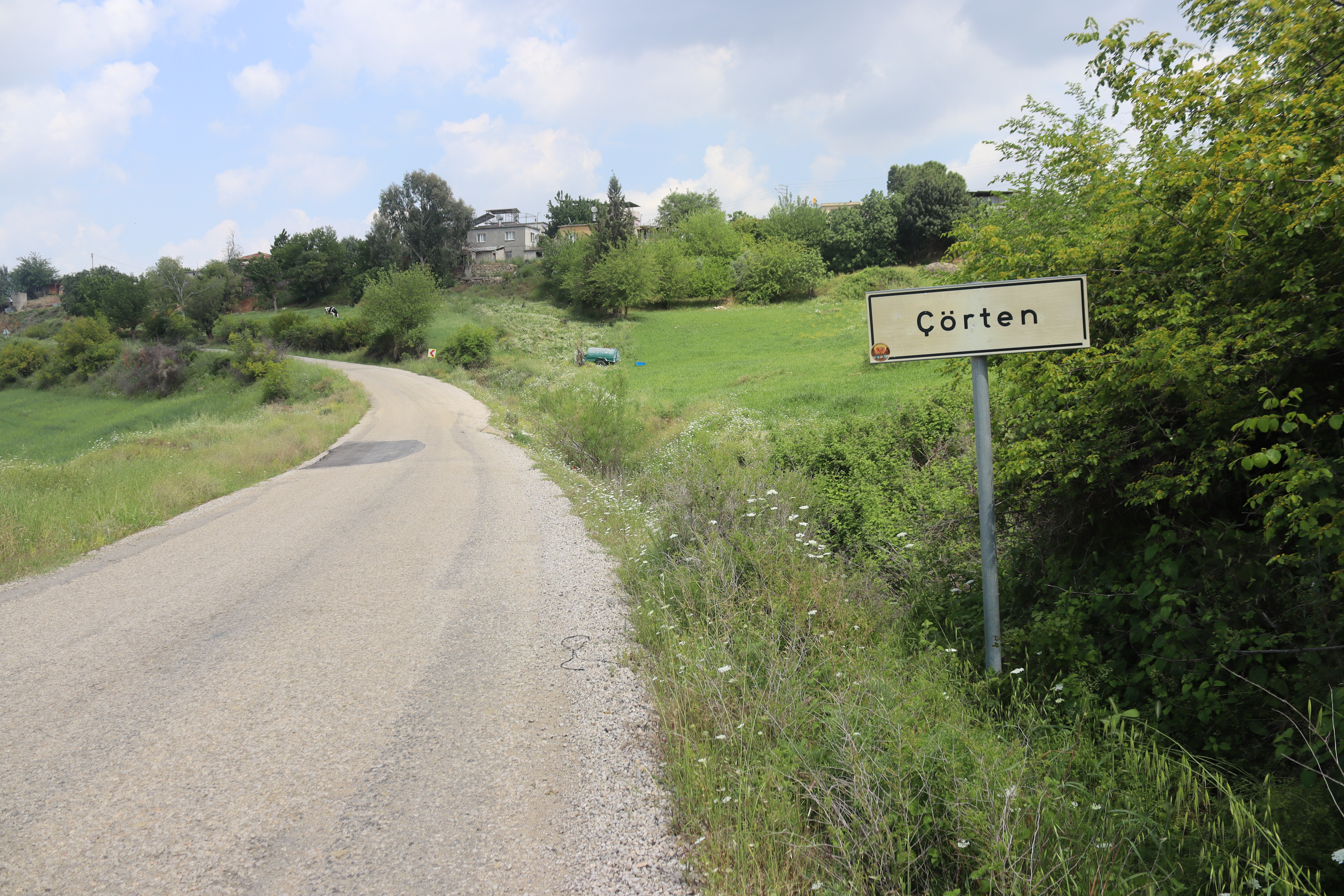
Çörten sign

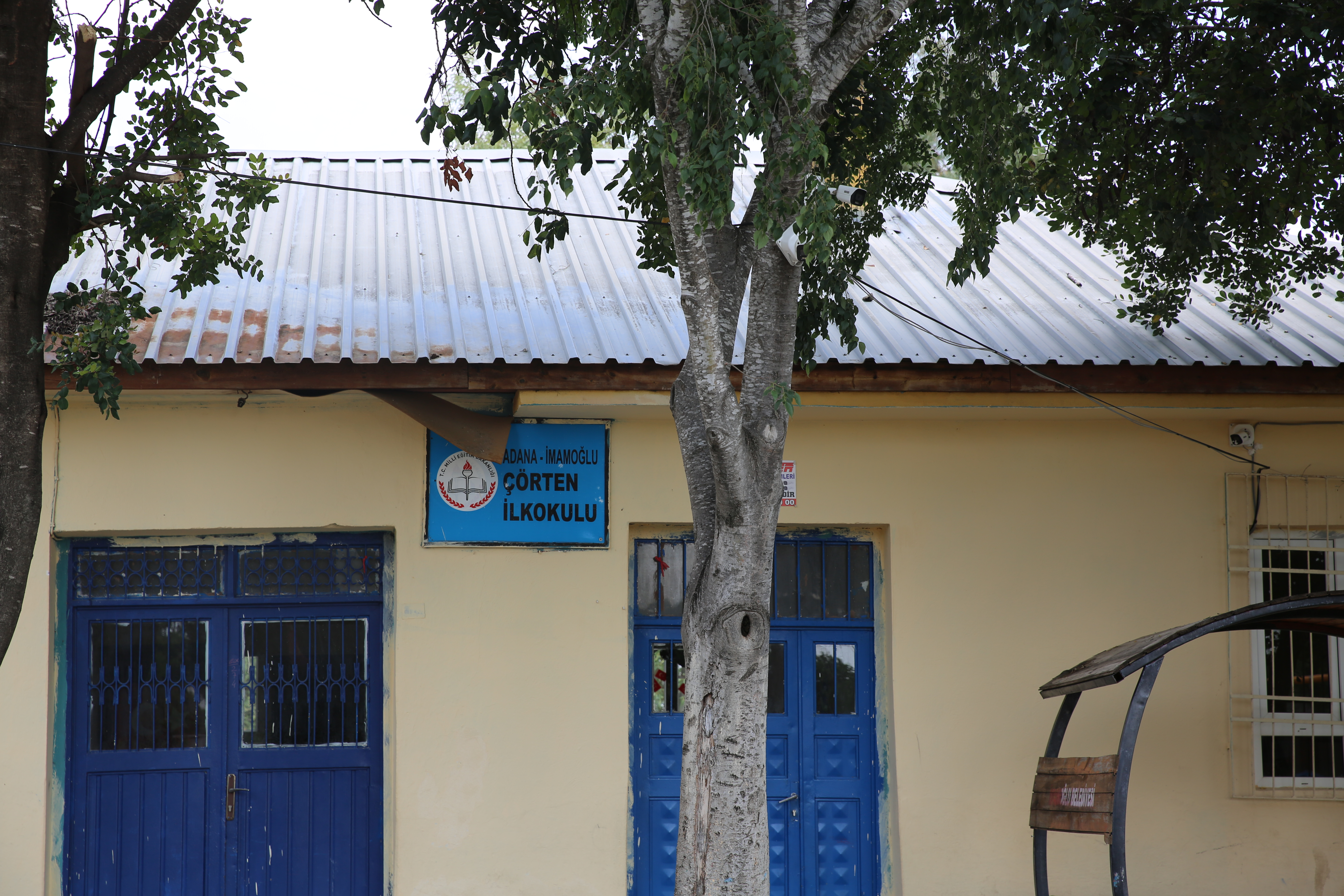
Çörten primary school
