= Alaca, Aziziye =

Village in Turkey

Alaca
- Neighbourhood
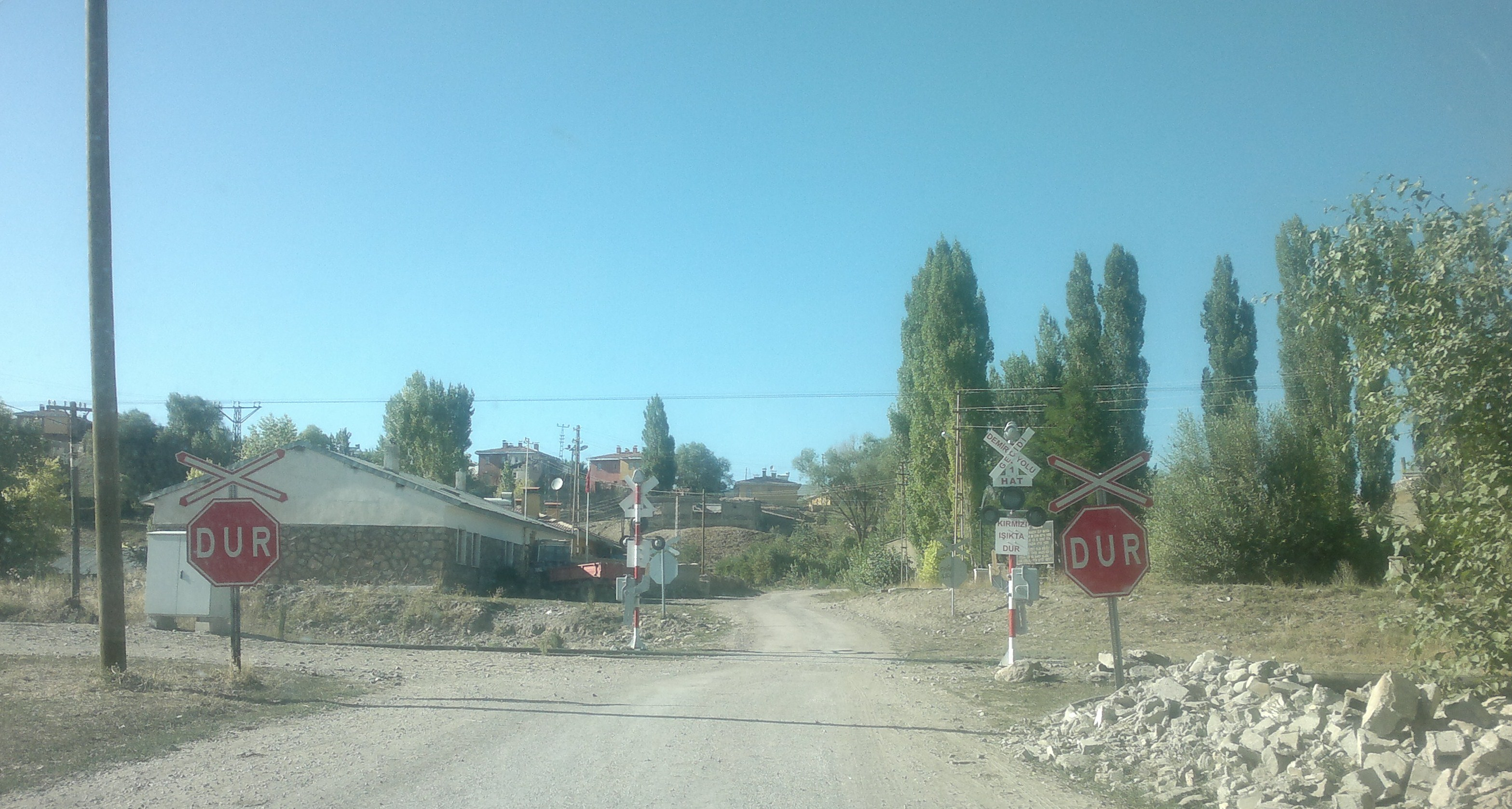

- Location within Turkey
- Coordinates: 39°56′42″N 40°57′41″E
- Country: Turkey
- Province: Erzurum
- District: Aziziye
- Population (2022): 287
- Time zone: UTC+3 (TRT)

Alaca is a neighbourhood in the municipality and district of Aziziye, Erzurum Province in Turkey. Its population is 287 (2022).
