= Sırlı, Aziziye =

Village in Turkey

Sırlı
- Neighbourhood
- Location in Turkey
- Coordinates: 40°13′06″N 41°05′47″E
- Country: Turkey
- Province: Erzurum
- District: Aziziye
- Population (2022): 102
- Time zone: UTC+3 (TRT)

Sırlı is a neighbourhood in the municipality and district of Aziziye, Erzurum Province in Turkey. Its population is 102 (2022).
