= Eğerti, Aziziye =

Village in Turkey

Eğerti
- Neighbourhood
- Location in Turkey
- Coordinates: 40°06′23″N 40°58′36″E
- Country: Turkey
- Province: Erzurum
- District: Aziziye
- Population (2022): 162
- Time zone: UTC+3 (TRT)

Eğerti is a neighbourhood in the municipality and district of Aziziye, Erzurum Province in Turkey. Its population is 162 (2022).
