= Üçköşe, Aziziye =

Village in Turkey

Üçköşe
- Neighbourhood
- Location in Turkey
- Coordinates: 40°12′N 41°00′E
- Country: Turkey
- Province: Erzurum
- District: Aziziye
- Population (2022): 108
- Time zone: UTC+3 (TRT)

Üçköşe is a neighbourhood in the municipality and district of Aziziye, Erzurum Province in Turkey. Its population is 108 (2022).
