= Tebrizcik, Aziziye =

Village in Turkey

Tebrizcik
- Neighbourhood
- Location in Turkey
- Coordinates: 39°55′33″N 41°00′14″E
- Country: Turkey
- Province: Erzurum
- District: Aziziye
- Population (2022): 320
- Time zone: UTC+3 (TRT)

Tebrizcik is a neighbourhood in the municipality and district of Aziziye, Erzurum Province in Turkey. Its population is 320 (2022).
