= Mahrızlı, Agdam =

Mahrızlı
- Location within Azerbaijan Location within Karabakh Economic Region
- Coordinates: 40°03′06″N 47°03′09″E
- Country: Azerbaijan
- Rayon: Agdam
- Municipality: Zəngişalı
- Time zone: UTC+4 (AZT)
  - Summer (DST): UTC+5 (AZT)

Mahrızlı (also, Makhryzly and Mekhrizli) is a village in the Agdam Rayon of Azerbaijan. The village forms part of the municipality of Zəngişalı.
