= Alaybeyi, Aziziye =

Village in Turkey

Alaybeyi
- Neighbourhood
- Location in Turkey
- Coordinates: 39°59′54″N 41°3′20″E
- Country: Turkey
- Province: Erzurum
- District: Aziziye
- Population (2022): 196
- Time zone: UTC+3 (TRT)

Alaybeyi is a neighbourhood in the municipality and district of Aziziye, Erzurum Province in Turkey. Its population is 196 (2022).
