= Koyunevi, İmamoğlu =

Koyunevi
- Neighbourhood
- Location in Turkey
- Coordinates: 37.2877°N 35.6559°E
- Country: Turkey
- Province: Adana
- District: İmamoğlu
- Population (2022): 594
- Time zone: UTC+3 (TRT)

Koyunevi is a neighbourhood in the municipality and district of İmamoğlu, Adana Province, Turkey. Its population is 594 (2022).
