= Kuzgun-Akhmerovo =

Kuzgun-Akhmerovo Кузгун-Ахмерово
- Village
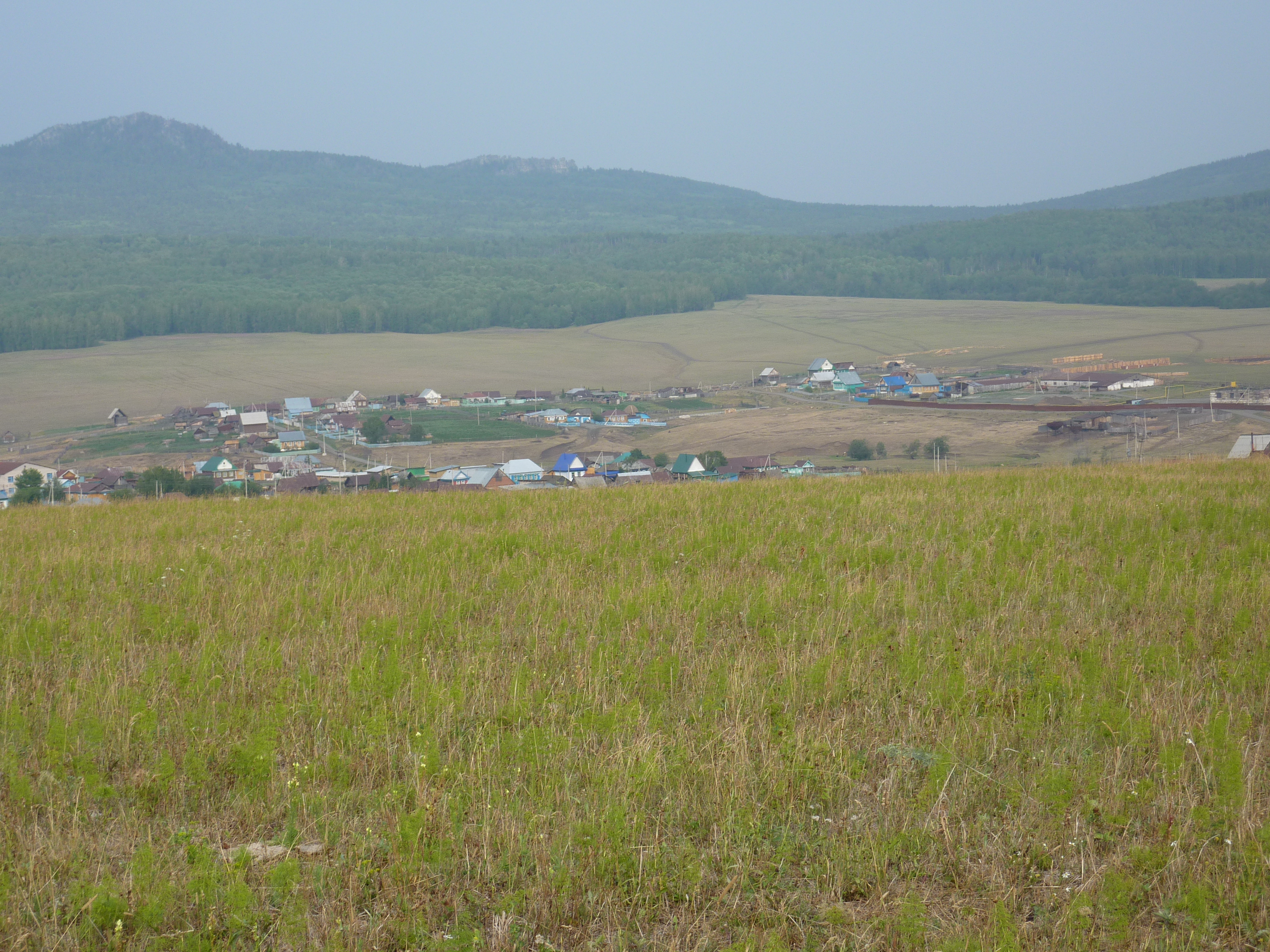
- Kuzgun-Akhmerovo

- Location within Bashkortostan Location within Russia
- Coordinates: 53°59′N 58°14′E
- Country: Russia
- Region: Bashkortostan
- District: Beloretsky District
- Time zone: UTC+5:00

Kuzgun-Akhmerovo (Russian: Кузгун-Ахмерово; Bashkir: Ҡоҙғон-Әхмәр, Qoźğon-Äxmär) is a rural locality (a village) in Azikeyevsky Selsoviet, Beloretsky District, Bashkortostan, Russia. The population was 275 as of 2010. There are 11 streets.

== Geography ==
Kuzgun-Akhmerovo is located 15 km northwest of Beloretsk (the district's administrative centre) by road. Chernovka is the nearest rural locality.
