= Tağıbəyli =

- Location within Azerbaijan Location within Karabakh Economic Region
- Coordinates: 40°10′24″N 47°00′15″E
- Country: Azerbaijan
- Rayon: Agdam
- Time zone: UTC+4 (AZT)
  - Summer (DST): UTC+5 (AZT)

Tağıbəyli (also, Tagibeyli) is a village in the Agdam Rayon of Azerbaijan.
