= Sarahart =

Sarahart Սարահարթ
- Location within Armenia
- Coordinates: 40°52′26″N 44°12′36″E
- Country: Armenia
- Marz (Province): Lori Province
- Elevation: 1,725 m (5,659 ft)

Population (2011)
  - Total: 1,211
- Time zone: UTC+4 ( )
  - Summer (DST): UTC+5 ( )

Sarahart (Armenian: Սարահարթ, romanized: Sarahart’ and Saraart) is a town in the Lori Province of Armenia.
