= Evoğlu, Agdam =

Evoğlu
- Location within Azerbaijan Location within Karabakh Economic Region
- Coordinates: 40°01′N 47°05′E
- Country: Azerbaijan
- Rayon: Agdam
- Municipality: Qaradağlı
- Time zone: UTC+4 (AZT)

Evoğlu (Evoghlu) is a village in the Agdam District of Azerbaijan. The village forms part of the municipality of Qaradağlı.

== Etymology ==
The name comes from the Yiva tribe and the word "oglu" (descendant). In Russian, it translates as "descendants of the Yiva tribe."

== History ==
The first mentions of the village date back to the early 19th century. In 1913, according to the administrative-territorial division of the Elizavetpol province, the village of Evoghlu was part of the Zangishali rural community in Shusha district.

According to the results of the 1921 Azerbaijani agricultural census, the village of Evoghlu was part of the Garakhanli rural community in Shusha district, Azerbaijan SSR. The population was 307 people (67 households), with the predominant ethnicity being Azerbaijani Turks (Azerbaijanis).

In 1926, according to the administrative-territorial division of the Azerbaijan SSR, the village belonged to the Gargar sub-district of the Aghdam district. After the administrative reform and the abolition of districts in 1929, the Garadaghli rural council was established in the Aghdam district of Azerbaijan SSR. According to the administrative division in 1961 and 1977, the village of Evoghlu was part of the Garadaghli rural council in Aghdam district of Azerbaijan SSR.

In 1999, Azerbaijan carried out an administrative reform and established the Garadaghli municipality in Aghdam district.

== Geography ==
The village's elevation above sea level is 252 meters. A river called Gargarchay flows near the village. The village is located 13 km from the district centre Aghdam, 24 km from the temporary district centre Guzanly, and 347 km from Baku. The nearest railway station is Aghdam.
