= Yeşilvadi, Aziziye =

Village in Turkey

Yeşilvadi
- Neighbourhood
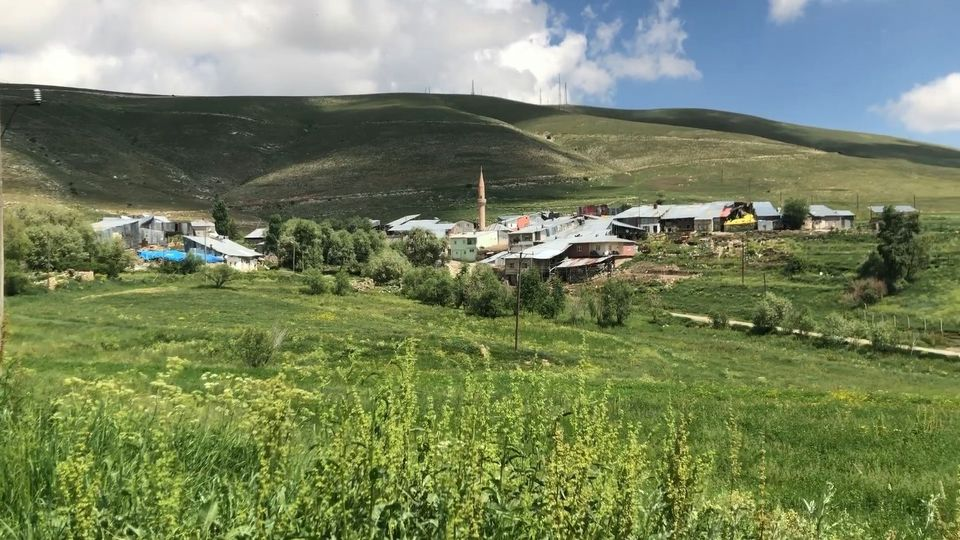
- Yeşilvadi village

- Location within Turkey
- Country: Turkey
- Province: Erzurum
- District: Aziziye
- Population (2022): 71
- Time zone: UTC+3 (TRT)

Yeşilvadi is a neighbourhood in the municipality and district of Aziziye, Erzurum Province in Turkey. Its population is 71 (2022). Village owner Mehmet aga
