= Kabaktepe, Aziziye =

Village in Turkey

Kabaktepe
- Neighbourhood
- Location in Turkey
- Coordinates: 40.265556°N 41.129167°E
- Country: Turkey
- Province: Erzurum
- District: Aziziye
- Population (2022): 79
- Time zone: UTC+3 (TRT)

Kabaktepe is a neighbourhood in the municipality and district of Aziziye, Erzurum Province in Turkey. Its population is 79 (2022).
