= Kuzgun, Aziziye =

Village in Turkey

Kuzgun
- Neighbourhood
- Location in Turkey
- Coordinates: 40°10′52″N 41°4′17″E
- Country: Turkey
- Province: Erzurum
- District: Aziziye
- Population (2022): 46
- Time zone: UTC+3 (TRT)

Kuzgun is a neighbourhood in the municipality and district of Aziziye, Erzurum Province in Turkey. Its population is 46 (2022).
