= Uluçınar, İmamoğlu =

Uluçınar
- Neighbourhood
- Country: Turkey
- Province: Adana
- District: İmamoğlu
- Population (2022): 50
- Time zone: UTC+3 (TRT)

Uluçınar is a neighbourhood in the municipality and district of İmamoğlu, Adana Province, Turkey. Its population is 50 (2022). The village is inhabited by Tahtacı.
