= Sevinçli, İmamoğlu =

Sevinçli
- Neighbourhood
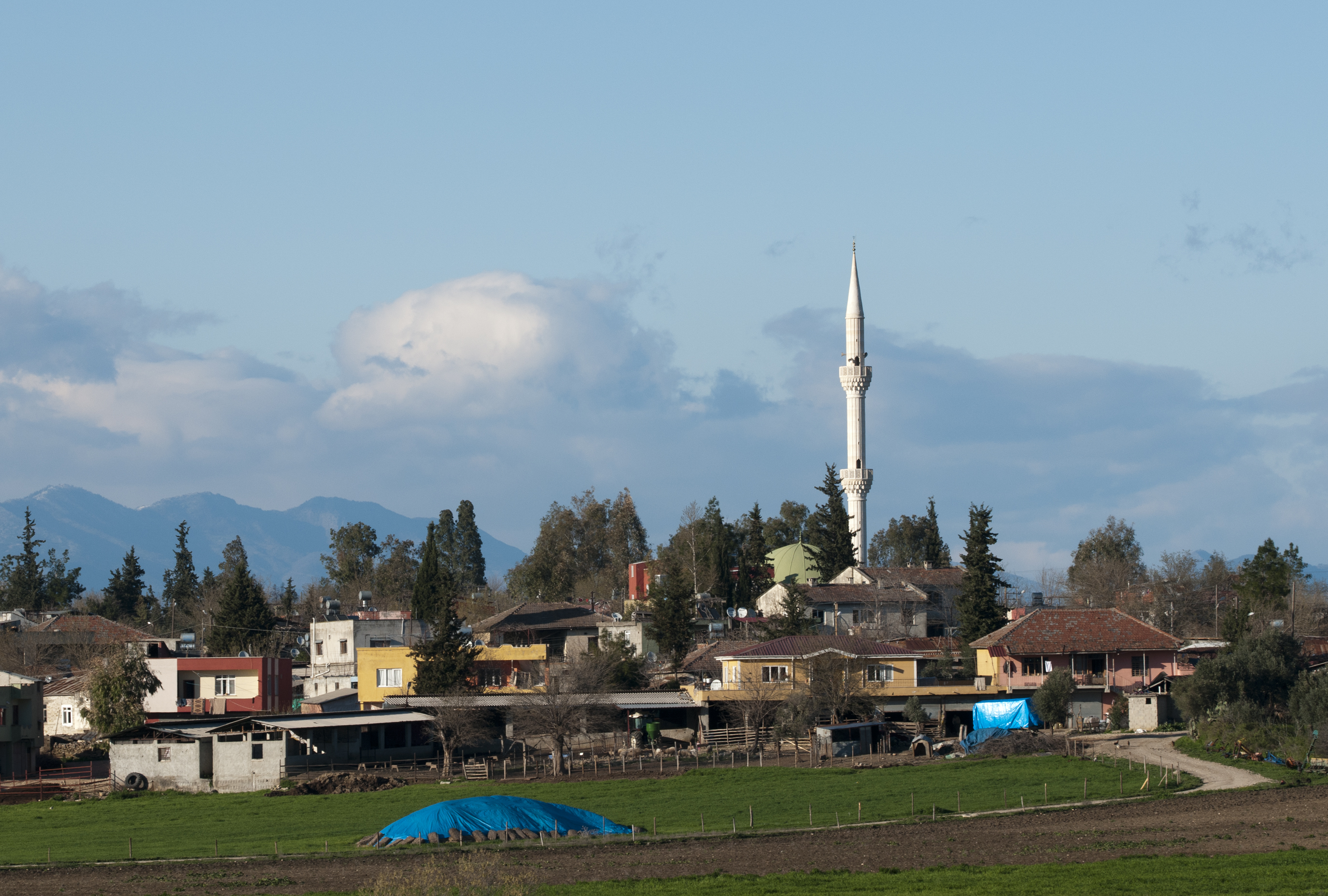

- Location within Turkey
- Country: Turkey
- Province: Adana
- District: İmamoğlu
- Population (2022): 531
- Time zone: UTC+3 (TRT)

Sevinçli is a neighbourhood in the municipality and district of İmamoğlu, Adana Province, Turkey. Its population is 531 (2022).
