= Alaybeyi, İmamoğlu =

Alaybeyi
- Neighbourhood
- Location in Turkey
- Coordinates: 37.2894°N 35.6172°E
- Country: Turkey
- Province: Adana
- District: İmamoğlu
- Population (2022): 325
- Time zone: UTC+3 (TRT)

Alaybeyi is a neighbourhood in the municipality and district of İmamoğlu, Adana Province, Turkey. Its population is 325 (2022).
