= İmamoğlu =

- District and municipality
- Map showing İmamoğlu District in Adana Province

- Location in Turkey
- Coordinates: 37°15′32″N 35°40′22″E
- Country: Turkey
- Province: Adana

Government
  - Mayor: Kasım Karaköse (CHP)
- Area: 445 km^{2} (172 sq mi)
- Elevation: 73 m (240 ft)
- Population (2022): 27,037
  - Density: 61/km^{2} (160/sq mi)
- Time zone: UTC+3 (TRT)
- Postal code: 01700
- Area code: 0322
- Website: imamoglubelediyesi.bel.tr

İmamoğlu is a municipality and district of Adana Province, Turkey. Its area is 445 km^{2}, and its population is 27,037 (2022). It is an agricultural community on a small plain in the hills between the cities of Adana and Kozan, 45 km from Adana, 27 km from Kozan.

== Composition ==
There are 27 neighbourhoods in İmamoğlu District:

- Adalet
- Ağzıkaraca
- Alaybeyi
- Aliler
- Ayvalı
- Camili
- Çörten
- Cumhuriyet
- Danacılı
- Fatih
- Hacıhasanlı
- Hürriyet
- Koyunevi
- Malıhıdırlı
- Menteş
- Otluk
- Pekmezci
- Sayca
- Saygeçit
- Sevinçli
- Sokutaş
- Tuna
- Üçtepe
- Ufacıkören
- Uluçınar
- Yazıtepe
- Yenievler
