= Qaradağlı, Agdam =

Qaradağlı
- Municipality
- Location within Azerbaijan Location within Karabakh Economic Region
- Coordinates: 40°01′45″N 47°04′09″E
- Country: Azerbaijan
- Rayon: Agdam

Population
  - Total: 4,832
- Time zone: UTC+4 (AZT)
  - Summer (DST): UTC+5 (AZT)

Qaradağlı (also, Karadagly) is a village and municipality in the Agdam Rayon of Azerbaijan. It has a population of 4,832. The municipality consists of the villages of Qaradağlı, Rzalar, and Evoğlu.
