= Zəngişalı =

- Municipality
- Location within Azerbaijan Location within Karabakh Economic Region
- Coordinates: 40°02′49″N 47°03′36″E
- Country: Azerbaijan
- Rayon: Agdam

Population
  - Total: 4,304
- Time zone: UTC+4 (AZT)
  - Summer (DST): UTC+5 (AZT)

Zəngişalı (also, Zənkişalı and Zangishaly) is a village and municipality in the Agdam Rayon of Azerbaijan. It has a population of 4,304. The municipality consists of the villages of Zəngişalı and Mahrızlı.
