= Vardenis, Aragatsotn =

Vardenis Վարդենիս
- Location within Armenia Location within Aragatsotn
- Coordinates: 40°34′18″N 44°24′10″E
- Country: Armenia
- Province: Aragatsotn
- Municipality: Aparan
- Elevation: 1,900 m (6,200 ft)

Population (2011)
  - Total: 700
- Time zone: UTC+4
  - Summer (DST): UTC+5

Vardenis (Armenian: Վարդենիս) is a village in the Aparan Municipality of the Aragatsotn Province of Armenia. The town has a 19th-century church.
