= Kuzgun Dam =

- Location within Turkey
- Official name: Kuzgun Baraji
- Country: Turkey
- Coordinates: 40°11′09″N 41°03′51″E
- Status: Operational
- Construction began: 1985
- Opening date: 1996
- Owner: Turkish State Hydraulic Works

Dam and spillways
- Impounds: Serçeme River
- Height: 110 m (361 ft)
- Dam volume: 3,627,000 m^{3} (4,743,937 cu yd)

Reservoir
- Total capacity: 312,000,000 m^{3} (252,943 acre⋅ft)
- Surface area: 11 km^{2} (4 mi^{2})

Power Station
- Installed capacity: 23 MW
- Annual generation: 36 GWh

The Kuzgun Dam is an embankment dam on the Serçeme River in Erzurum Province, Turkey. Constructed between 1985 and 1996, the development was backed by the Turkish State Hydraulic Works. The dam has a 23 MW power station and provides water for the irrigation of 22,276 hectares (55,050 acres).

== See also ==
- List of dams and reservoirs in Turkey
