= Cepi =

Cepi or CEPI may refer to:

- Coalition for Epidemic Preparedness Innovations, a Norway-based foundation that finances vaccine development
- Confederation of European Paper Industries, a pan-European association representing the forest fibre and paper industry
- Frank J. "Cepi" Cepollina (born 1936), American engineer and inventor who worked for NASA

== See also ==
- Čepí, a village in the Pardubice Region of the Czech Republic.
- Çepi, Karayazı, Turkey, a neighbourhood
