= 2025 European Athletics U23 Championships – Women's 800 metres =

Women's 800 metres at the 2025 European Athletics U23 Championships
- Venue: Fana Stadion
- Location: Bergen, Norway
- Dates: 17 July (heats); 19 July (final)
- Competitors: 29 from 18 nations
- Winning time: 1:57.42 CR

Medalists
gold medal	Audrey Werro	Switzerland
silver medal	Rocío Arroyo	Spain
bronze medal	Abigail Ives	Great Britain

The women's 800 metres event at the 2025 European Athletics U23 Championships was held in Bergen, Norway, at Fana Stadion on 17 and 19 July.

== Records ==
Prior to the competition, the records were as follows:

Record	Athlete (nation)	Time (s)	Location	Date
European U23 record	Keely Hodgkinson (GBR)	1:54.61	London, United Kingdom	20 July 2024
Championship U23 record	Yelena Kofanova (RUS)	1:58.94	Kaunas, Lithuania	18 July 2009

== Results ==
=== Heats ===
First 2 in each heat (Q) and the next 2 fastest (q) qualified for the final.

==== Heat 1 ====
Place	Athlete	Nation	Time	Notes
1	Audrey Werro	Switzerland	2:00.89	Q
2	Dilek Koçak	Turkey	2:01.34	Q, SB
3	Georgia-Maria Despollari	Greece	2:01.69	q, PB
4	Nora Haugen	Norway	2:02.59	q, PB
5	Magdalena Breza	Poland	2:02.98	
6	Petja Klojčnik	Slovenia	2:03.42	PB
7	Martina Canazza	Italy	2:06.96	
8	Alina Korsunska	Ukraine	2:07.83	
9	Claudia Ionela Costiuc	Romania	2:12.07	
—	Veera Mattila	Finland	DNF	

==== Heat 2 ====
Place	Athlete	Nation	Time	Notes
1	Abigail Ives	Great Britain	2:02.19	Q
2	Ngalula Gloria Kabangu	Italy	2:02.61	Q
3	Maeve O'Neill	Ireland	2:02.66	PB
4	Valentina Rosamilia	Switzerland	2:02.76	
5	Emmanouela Plaka	Greece	2:02.91	PB
6	Veronika Sadek	Slovenia	2:03.69	
7	Andrea Rodríguez	Spain	2:03.80	PB
8	Invida Mauriņa	Latvia	2:10.27	
—	Sigrid Bjørnsdatter Wahlberg	Norway	DNF	
—	Dilan Yilmaz	Turkey	DQ	TR 17.5.1

==== Heat 3 ====
Place	Athlete	Nation	Time	Notes
1	Julia Jaguścik	Poland	2:02.71	Q
2	Rocío Arroyo	Spain	2:02.93	Q, PB
3	Pavla Štoudková	Czech Republic	2:03.13	
4	Elena Kluskens	Belgium	2:03.82	
5	Malin Hoelsveen	Norway	2:04.65 [.641]	
6	Federica Pansini	Italy	2:04.65 [.642]	
7	Emma Moore	Ireland	2:05.32	
8	Nicole Prauchner	Austria	2:05.80	
9	Lieke Hoogsteen	Netherlands	2:07.86	

=== Final ===
Place	Athlete	Nation	Time	Notes
1st place, gold medalist(s)	Audrey Werro	Switzerland	1:57.42	CR
2nd place, silver medalist(s)	Rocío Arroyo	Spain	1:59.18	NU23R
3rd place, bronze medalist(s)	Abigail Ives	Great Britain	1:59.77	
4	Georgia-Maria Despollari	Greece	2:00.92	NU23R
5	Julia Jaguścik	Poland	2:01.10	PB
6	Ngalula Gloria Kabangu	Italy	2:01.12	PB
7	Nora Haugen	Norway	2:01.60	PB
—	Dilek Koçak	Turkey	DNF	
