= 2022 World Athletics U20 Championships – Women's 800 metres =

Women's 800 metres at the 2022 World Athletics U20 Championships
- Venue: Estadio Olímpico Pascual Guerrero
- Dates: 1 August (round 1); 2 August (semi-final); 3 August (final)
- Competitors: 38 from 27 nations
- Winning time: 1:59.13

Medalists
gold medal	Roisin Willis	United States
silver medal	Audrey Werro	Switzerland
bronze medal	Juliette Whittaker	United States

The women's 800 metres at the 2022 World Athletics U20 Championships was held at the Estadio Olímpico Pascual Guerrero in Cali, Colombia from 1 to 3 August 2022.

42 athletes from 29 countries were originally entered to the competition. However; Sanae Hasnaoui from Morocco, Ramot Abike Jimoh from Nigeria and Tharushi Dissanayaka from Sri Lanka did not participate, while the third runner entered by the United States, Michaela Rose, was unable to compete since only two athletes per member nation can compete in each event.

== Records ==
U20 standing records prior to the 2022 World Athletics U20 Championships were as follows:

Record	Athlete & Nationality	Mark	Location	Date
World U20 Record	Pamela Jelimo (KEN)	1:54.01	Zürich, Switzerland	29 August 2008
Championship Record	Diribe Welteji (ETH)	1:59.74	Tampere, Finland	12 July 2018
World U20 Leading	Juliette Whittaker (USA)	1:59.04	Eugene, United States	25 June 2022

== Results ==
=== Round 1 ===
Round 1 took place on 1 August, with the 38 athletes involved being split into 5 heats, 3 heats of 8 athletes and 2 of 7. The first 4 athletes in each heat ( Q ) and the next 4 fastest ( q ) qualified to the semi-final. The overall results were as follows:

Rank	Heat	Name	Nationality	Time	Note
1	3	Juliette Whittaker	United States	2:04.92	Q
2	3	Dilek Koçak	Turkey	2:05.37	Q
3	3	Hayley Kitching	Australia	2:05.48	Q
4	3	Invida Mauriņa	Latvia	2:05.65	Q PB
5	2	Ksanet Alem	Ethiopia	2:05.77	Q
6	1	Nelly Chepchirchir	Kenya	2:06.66	Q
7	1	Veronika Sadek	Slovenia	2:07.10	Q
8	3	Anne Gine Løvnes	Norway	2:07.24	q
9	2	Abigail Ives	Great Britain	2:07.35	Q
10	1	Veera Mattila	Finland	2:07.36	Q
11	2	Evaline Kipkirwok	Kenya	2:07.69	Q
12	1	Celine van Heerikhuize	Netherlands	2:07.78	Q
13	2	Valentina Rosamilia	Switzerland	2:07.94	Q
14	5	Claudia Hollingsworth	Australia	2:08.21	Q
15	1	Lamiae Mamouni	Morocco	2:08.27	q
16	2	Martina Canazza	Italy	2:08.69	q
17	1	Ashakiran Barla	India	2:09.01	q
18	1	Hallee Knelsen	Canada	2:09.09	
19	5	Audrey Werro	Switzerland	2:09.49	Q
20	4	Wezam Tesfay	Ethiopia	2:09.67	Q
21	4	Roisin Willis	United States	2:09.68	Q
22	5	Lova Perman	Sweden	2:09.92	Q
23	5	Ronja Koskela	Finland	2:10.05	Q
24	4	Macey Hilton	New Zealand	2:10.29	Q
25	5	Cosina Ermert	Germany	2:10.36	
26	4	Petja Klojčnik	Slovenia	2:10.40	Q
27	4	Iris Downes	Great Britain	2:10.56	
28	4	Avery Pearson	Canada	2:10.94	
29	3	Anita Poma	Peru	2:11.14	
30	5	Marli Dimond	South Africa	2:11.60	
31	2	Maureen Chebet	Uganda	2:12.25	
32	4	Laita Sandilea	India	2:12.38	
33	2	Ainuska Kalil Kyzy	Kyrgyzstan	2:12.42	PB
34	3	Izandri Jacobs	South Africa	2:12.83	
35	2	Karol Mosquera	Colombia	2:14.19	PB
36	5	Rushana Dwyer	Jamaica	2:14.23	
37	1	Scholastica Herman	Papua New Guinea	2:15.89	PB
38	5	Yaxury Guido	Nicaragua	2:21.14	

=== Semi-final ===
The semi-final took place on 2 August, with the 24 athletes involved being split into 3 heats of 8 athletes each. The first 2 athletes in each heat ( Q ) and the next 2 fastest ( q ) qualified to the final. The overall results were as follows:

Rank	Heat	Name	Nationality	Time	Note
1	1	Audrey Werro	Switzerland	2:01.25	Q
2	1	Veronika Sadek	Slovenia	2:01.65	Q
3	2	Abigail Ives	Great Britain	2:01.92	Q
4	2	Juliette Whittaker	United States	2:01.92	Q
5	2	Nelly Chepchirchir	Kenya	2:02.03	q
6	1	Hayley Kitching	Australia	2:02.12 PB	q
7	3	Roisin Willis	United States	2:02.49	Q
8	3	Ksanet Alem	Ethiopia	2:03.44	Q
9	2	Dilek Koçak	Turkey	2:04.06 PB	
10	3	Valentina Rosamilia	Switzerland	2:04.64	
11	2	Lova Perman	Sweden	2:04.92	
12	3	Petja Klojčnik	Slovenia	2:06.42	
13	1	Lamiae Mamouni	Morocco	2:06.62	
14	2	Anne Gine Løvnes	Norway	2:06.78	
15	3	Ashakiran Barla	India	2:06.86	
16	3	Ronja Koskela	Finland	2:07.21	
17	3	Evaline Kipkirwok	Kenya	2:07.40	
18	1	Wezam Tesfay	Ethiopia	2:07.62	
19	2	Invida Mauriņa	Latvia	2:09.12	
20	1	Martina Canazza	Italy	2:11.01	
21	1	Celine van Heerikhuize	Netherlands	2:11.89	
22	2	Macey Hilton	New Zealand	2:12.29	
	1	Veera Mattila	Finland	DNF	
	3	Claudia Hollingsworth	Australia	DQ	

=== Final ===
The final (originally scheduled at 18:10) was started at 20:11 on 3 August. The results were as follows:

Rank	Name	Nationality	Time	Note
1st place, gold medalist(s)	Roisin Willis	United States	1:59.13	CR
2nd place, silver medalist(s)	Audrey Werro	Switzerland	1:59.53	NU20R
3rd place, bronze medalist(s)	Juliette Whittaker	United States	2:00.18	
4	Nelly Chepchirchir	Kenya	2:01.42	PB
5	Veronika Sadek	Slovenia	2:02.78	
6	Abigail Ives	Great Britain	2:02.89	
7	Hayley Kitching	Australia	2:03.44	
8	Ksanet Alem	Ethiopia	2:03.62	
