= Bezirhane =

Bezirhane can refer to:

- Bezirhane, Gölbaşı
- Bezirhane, Karayazı
