= Kayalar =

Kayalar can refer to:

- Kayalar, Karayazı, Turkey
- Kayalar, Maden, Turkey
- Kayalar, someone from Kayalpatnam, Tamil Nadu, India
