= Üzengili =

Üzengili can refer to:

- Üzengili, Bayburt
- Üzengili, Karayazı
