= Doruca =

Doruca can refer to:

- Doruca, Karayazı
- Doruca, Kemah
