= Juliette Whittaker =

American middle-distance runner (born 2003)

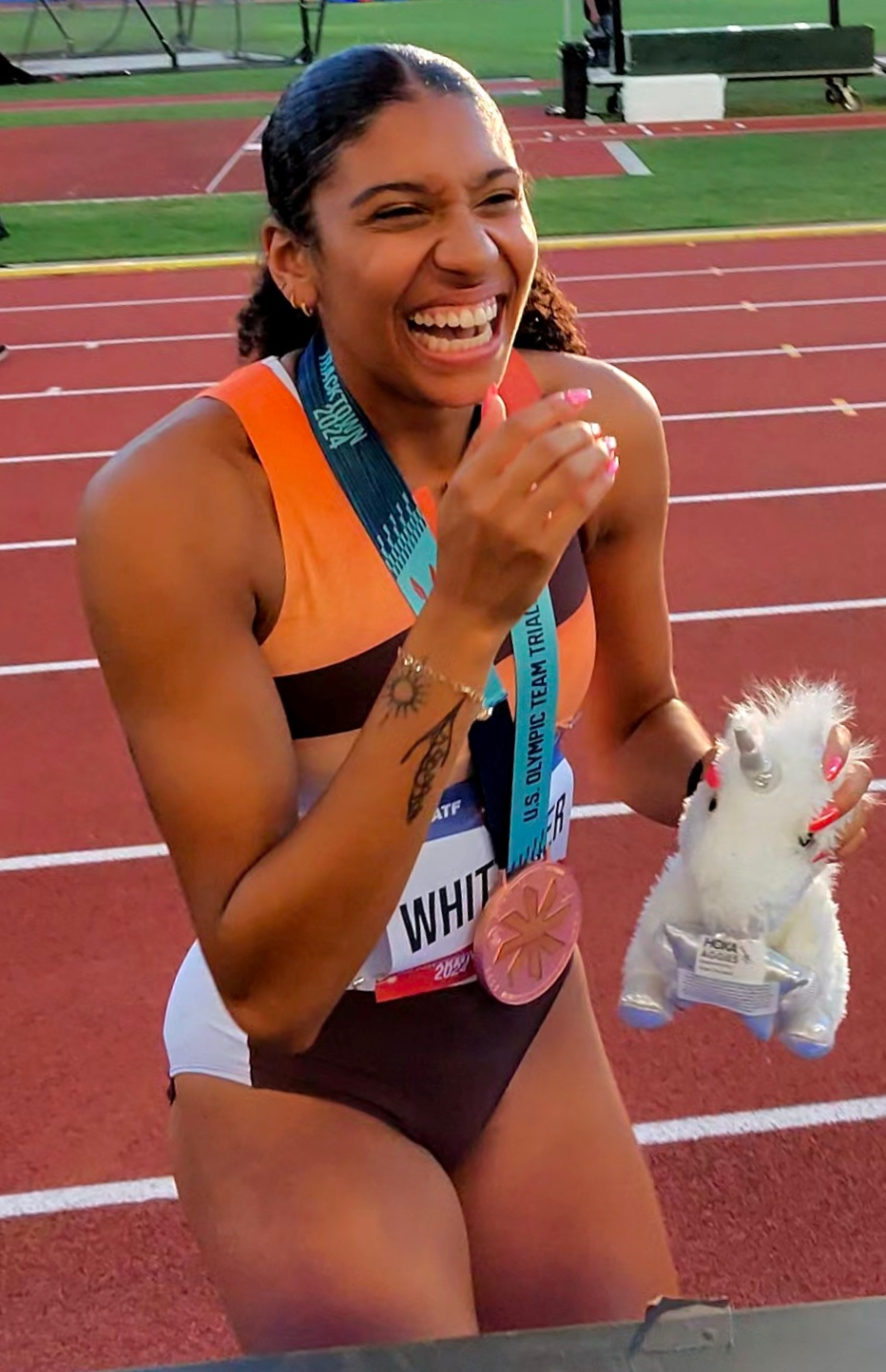
- Whittaker after making her first Olympic team at the 2024 U.S. trials

Personal information
- Born: December 1, 2003 (age 22) Laurel, Maryland, U.S.
- Education: Stanford University

Sport
- Sport: Track and field
- Events: 800 m, 1500 m
- University team: Stanford Cardinal
- Coached by: J.J. Clark

Achievements and titles
- Personal bests: 800 m: 1:57.76 (Paris 2024); 1500 m: 4:12.49 (Walnut 2023); Indoor; 800 m: 1:59.53 (Boston 2024); Mile: 4:30.92 (Boston 2024)
Medal record
Women's athletics
Representing United States
World U20 Championships
Bronze medal – third place	2022 Cali	800 m

Juliette Whittaker (born December 1, 2003) is an American middle-distance runner who specializes in the 800 metres. She is a two-time NCAA 800 m champion and represented the United States at the 2024 Summer Olympics.

== Athletics career ==
=== High School ===
Whittaker attended Mount de Sales Academy in Catonsville, Maryland from 2018 to 2022, where she rose to prominence winning numerous state and national titles and setting multiple state and national records.

==== 2021 ====
As a junior in 2021, Whittaker ran under 2:02 in the 800 m six-times and competed at the US Olympic trials, reaching the semi-final. At the Brooks PR Invitational in July, she won the mile in a time of 4:38.65, the fastest time of any high schooler in 2021.

==== 2022 ====
In May 2022, Whittaker became only the second high schooler (behind Mary Cain), to break the 2-minute barrier in the 800 m, by clocking a time of 1:59.80 to beat a field of professionals at Icahn Stadium in New York City. The following month, she broke Cain's high school national record of 1:59.51, running a time of 1:59.04 to win the USA U20 Championships at Hayward Field. In August, Whittaker competed at the World U20 Championships in Cali, Colombia. There she won a bronze medal in 2:00.18, only behind fellow Stanford commit Roisin Willis and Swiss athlete Audrey Werro, who both ran under the previous championships record.

=== Stanford University ===
==== 2023 ====
In fall 2022, Whittaker enrolled at Stanford University, joining the Stanford Cardinal track and field and cross country teams. At the 2023 NCAA Championships, Whittaker contested the individual 800 m as well as the 4 × 400 m relay and the distance medley relay. In the 800 m, she placed second, going 1–2 with fellow Stanford freshman Roisin Willis in a time of 2:00.05. She also anchored the Stanford DMR to a first-place finish and ran the third leg on the twelfth place Cardinal 4 × 400 m relay team.

During the 2023 outdoor season, Whittaker won the Pac-12 800 m title, but chose to contest the 1500 m at the NCAA West Regional Qualifier. However, she failed qualify for the NCAA Championship after placing eighth in her heat.

After the track season, Whittaker signed an NIL deal with On.

==== 2024 ====
Choosing to contest the 800 m at the 2024 NCAA Indoor Championships, she won her first NCAA individual title in an indoor personal best of 1:59.53, also breaking the meet record. She went on to win the 800 m at the 2024 NCAA Outdoor Championships in 1:59.61, a new Stanford record. She also become the first person to win both the NCAA indoor and outdoor 800 titles in the same year since Oregon’s Raevyn Rogers in 2017

Whittaker earned a spot on the United States Olympic team by finishing third in the women's 800 meters at the national trials on June 23, 2024, in Eugene, Oregon, with a time of 1:58.45. At the Olympics, she ran a personal best of 1:57.76 in her semi-final. She went on place 7th in the final.

==== 2025 ====
She reached the semi-finals of the 800 metres at the 2025 USA Outdoor Track and Field Championships.

== Personal life ==
Her parents Paul and Jill, both ran in college. Paul was a mid-distance runner and Jill was a hurdler. One of four siblings, her sister Isabella Whittaker competes as a sprinter and ran collegiately for both the University of Pennsylvania and the University of Arkansas. Her father, Paul, coaches her and an all boys high school track team, Mount Saint Joseph in Baltimore Maryland.
