= Çelikli =

Çelikli can refer to:

- Çelikli, Karayazı
- Çelikli, Sur
