= Yahyaköy =

Yahyaköy can refer to:

- Yahyaköy, Karayazı
- Yahyaköy, Susurluk
