= 2025 European Athletics U23 Championships – Women's 4 × 400 metres relay =

Women's 4 × 400 metres relay at the 2025 European Athletics U23 Championships
- Venue: Fana Stadion
- Location: Bergen, Norway
- Dates: 20 July
- Competitors: 59 from 12 nations
- Winning time: 3:26.52 CR, EU23R

Medalists
gold medal	Rebecca Grieve; Emily Newnham; Poppy Malik; Yemi Mary John; Holly Mpassy; Abigail Ives	Great Britain
silver medal	Natalia Rojas; Ana Prieto; Berta Segura; Rocío Arroyo; Elisa Lorenzo	Spain
bronze medal	Laure-Anne Faleme; Lou-Anne Pouzancre-Hoyer; Benedetta Kouakou; Alexe Déau; Léa Thery-Demarque; Mathilde Descoux	France

The women's 4 × 400 metres relay event at the 2025 European Athletics U23 Championships was held in Bergen, Norway, at Fana Stadion on 20 July.

== Records ==
Prior to the competition, the records were as follows:

Record	Nation	Time (s)	Location	Date
European U23 record	Russia (RUS)	3:26.58	Debrecen, Hungary	15 July 2007
Championship U23 record	Russia (RUS)	3:26.58	Debrecen, Hungary	15 July 2007

== Results ==
=== Heats ===
First 3 in each heat (Q) and the next 2 fastest (q) advance to the final.

==== Heat 1 ====
Place	Nation	Athletes	Time	Notes
1	Great Britain	Holly Mpassy, Poppy Malik, Abigail Ives, Rebecca Grieve	3:32.09	Q, SB
2	France	Laure-Anne Faleme, Léa Thery-Demarque, Mathilde Descoux, Benedetta Kouakou	3:32.27	Q, SB
3	Switzerland	Julin-Maria Dill, Valentina Rosamilia, Kaya Simasotchi, Audrey Werro	3:32.53	Q, SB
4	Poland	Klaudia Osipiuk, Martyna Guzowska, Olivia Greiner, Dominika Duraj	3:32.94	q, SB
5	Norway	Laura Tietje Johanna van der Veen, Selma Ims, Maren Bakke Amundsen, Nora Haugen	3:33.24	q, SB
6	Ireland	Kate O'Connell, Victoria Amiadamen, Emma Moore, Jenna Breen	3:34.81	SB

==== Heat 2 ====
Place	Nation	Athletes	Time	Notes
1	Spain	Elisa Lorenzo, Berta Segura, Natalia Rojas, Rocío Arroyo	3:31.69	Q, SB
2	Germany	Lena Leege, Sabrina Heil, Maja Schorr, Yasmin Amaadacho	3:31.70	Q
3	Italy	Clarissa Vianelli, Zoe Tessarolo, Camilla Rossi, Alessia Seramondi	3:31.73	Q, NU23R
4	Greece	Elimpiona Zenegia, Emmanouela Plaka, Georgia-Maria Despollari, Laoura Zenegia	3:34.21	NU23R
5	Sweden	Moa Granat , Tilde Bjerager, Ellen Schoug, Elna Wester	3:34.32	NU23R
6	Slovenia	Ajda Kaučič, Petja Klojčnik, Uršula Černelč, Karolina Zbičajnik	3:35.15	NU23R

=== Final ===
Place	Nation	Athletes	Time	Notes
1st place, gold medalist(s)	Rebecca Grieve, Emily Newnham, Poppy Malik, Yemi Mary John	Great Britain	3:26.52	CR, EU23R
2nd place, silver medalist(s)	Natalia Rojas, Ana Prieto, Berta Segura, Rocío Arroyo	Spain	3:28.06	NU23R
3rd place, bronze medalist(s)	Laure-Anne Faleme, Lou-Anne Pouzancre-Hoyer, Benedetta Kouakou, Alexe Déau	France	3:28.37	NU23R
4	Lena Leege, Vivienne Morgenstern, Vanessa Baldé, Anouk Krause-Jentsch	Germany	3:28.66	SB
5	Klaudia Osipiuk, Martyna Guzowska, Paulina Kubis, Dominika Duraj	Poland	3:29.98	SB
6	Laura Tietje Johanna van der Veen, Henriette Jæger, Maren Bakke Amundsen, Nora Haugen	Norway	3:30.88	NU23R
7	Kaya Simasotchi, Valentina Rosamilia, Iris Caligiuri, Audrey Werro	Switzerland	3:31.38	SB
8	Clarissa Vianelli, Zoe Tessarolo, Camilla Rossi, Alessia Seramondi	Italy	3:32.84	
