= Abdurrahmanköy, Karayazı =

Village in Turkey

Abdurrahmanköy
- Neighbourhood
- Location in Turkey
- Coordinates: 39°35′50″N 42°29′47″E
- Country: Turkey
- Province: Erzurum
- District: Karayazı
- Population (2022): 237
- Time zone: UTC+3 (TRT)

Abdurrahmanköy is a neighbourhood in the municipality and district of Karayazı, Erzurum Province in Turkey. Its population is 237 (2022).
