= Çayırbeyli, Karayazı =

Village in Turkey

Çayırbeyli
- Neighbourhood
- Location in Turkey
- Coordinates: 39°49′N 42°14′E
- Country: Turkey
- Province: Erzurum
- District: Karayazı
- Population (2022): 480
- Time zone: UTC+3 (TRT)

Çayırbeyli is a neighbourhood in the municipality and district of Karayazı, Erzurum Province in Turkey. Its population is 480 (2022).
