= Ağaçlı, Karayazı =

Village in Turkey

Ağaçlı
- Neighbourhood
- Location in Turkey
- Coordinates: 39.5070°N 42.1981°E
- Country: Turkey
- Province: Erzurum
- District: Karayazı
- Population (2022): 284
- Time zone: UTC+3 (TRT)

Ağaçlı is a neighbourhood in the municipality and district of Karayazı, Erzurum Province in Turkey. Its population is 284 (2022).
