= Salyamaç, Karayazı =

Village in Turkey

Salyamaç
- Neighbourhood
- Location in Turkey
- Coordinates: 39°37′04″N 42°01′39″E
- Country: Turkey
- Province: Erzurum
- District: Karayazı
- Population (2022): 643
- Time zone: UTC+3 (TRT)

Salyamaç is a neighbourhood in the municipality and district of Karayazı, Erzurum Province in Turkey. Its population is 643 (2022).
