= Kırgındere, Karayazı =

Village in Turkey

Kırgındere
- Neighbourhood
- Location in Turkey
- Coordinates: 39°43′N 41°59′E
- Country: Turkey
- Province: Erzurum
- District: Karayazı
- Population (2022): 187
- Time zone: UTC+3 (TRT)

Kırgındere is a neighbourhood in the municipality and district of Karayazı, Erzurum Province in Turkey. Its population is 187 (2022).
