= Dilek Koçak =

Turkish middle-distance runner (born 2005)

Personal information
- Nationality: Turkish
- Born: 15 August 2005 (age 20) Üzengili, Karayazı, Erzurum, Turkey

Sport
- Sport: Running
- Event(s): 800 m, 1500 m
- Club: Fenerbahçe Athletics

Achievements and titles
- Personal best(s): 800 m: 2:04.35 (2022); 1500 m: 4:14.90 (2022)
Medal record
Representing Turkey
Women's athletics
European Athletics U20 Championships
Bronze medal – third place	2023 Jerusalem	800 m
Gold medal – first place	2023 Jerusalem	1500 m

Dilek Koçak (born 15 August 2005) is a Turkish middle-distance running athlete, who competes over distances 800 m and 1500 m. She is the European U20 champion in 1500 m.

== Personal life ==
Dilek Koçak was born in Üzengili village of Karayazı district in Erzurum on 15 August 2005. After she started in athletics, she was schooled in the Erzurum Sport High School, recommended by her coach Demir.

== Sport career ==
Koçak was discovered as a track athlete by the physical education teacher and athletics coach Cahit Demir, while she was grazing animals at her village Üzengili intown, karayazı, Erzurum, eastern Turkey, a location situated at 1,450 m (4,760 ft) above mean sea level. Demir convinced her father to take her for training at Karayazı town, where he was working. At the age of sixteen, she transferred to Fenerbahçe Athletics in Istanbul.

On 15 May 2022 in Mersin, she broke the 15-year-old Turkish women's U18 record in the 800 m event with a time of 2:06.95. Two weeks later, on 29 May in Bursa, she renewed her own record with 2:04.35.

Koçak participated at the 2022 World Athletics U20 Championships in Cali, Colombia. She competed in the semifinal of the 800 m event, and in the final of the 1500 m event. She set a new Turkish U18 record in the 1500 m with her time of 4:14.90, more than five seconds better than the previous record.

At the 2023 European Athletics U20 Championships in Jerusalem, Israel, she won the bronze medal in the 800 m event, and became European U20 champion in the 1500 m event.

She competed in the 800 m event at the 2025 European Athletics Team Championships Second Division in Maribor, Slovenia, and placed sixth with her season's best time of 2:03.29. She contributed to her team's record with eleven points.
