= Muratlı, Karayazı =

Village in Turkey

Muratlı
- Neighbourhood
- Location within Turkey
- Coordinates: 39°39′45″N 42°19′56″E
- Country: Turkey
- Province: Erzurum
- District: Karayazı
- Population (2022): 66
- Time zone: UTC+3 (TRT)

Muratlı is a neighbourhood in the municipality and district of Karayazı, Erzurum Province in Turkey. Its population is 66 (2022).
