= Karasu, Karayazı =

Village in Turkey

Karasu
- Neighbourhood
- Country: Turkey
- Province: Erzurum
- District: Karayazı
- Population (2022): 391
- Time zone: UTC+3 (TRT)

Karasu is a neighbourhood in the municipality and district of Karayazı, Erzurum Province in Turkey. Its population is 391 (2022).
