= Yolgören, Karayazı =

Village in Turkey

Yolgören
- Neighbourhood
- Location in Turkey
- Coordinates: 39°31′58″N 41°59′28″E
- Country: Turkey
- Province: Erzurum
- District: Karayazı
- Population (2022): 140
- Time zone: UTC+3 (TRT)

Yolgören is a neighbourhood in the municipality and district of Karayazı, Erzurum Province in Turkey. Its population is 140 (2022).
