= Göksu, Karayazı =

Village in Turkey

Göksu
- Neighbourhood
- Country: Turkey
- Province: Erzurum
- District: Karayazı
- Population (2022): 563
- Time zone: UTC+3 (TRT)

Göksu is a neighbourhood in the municipality and district of Karayazı, Erzurum Province in Turkey. Its population is 563 (2022).
