= Çavuşköy, Karayazı =

Village in Turkey

Çavuşköy
- Neighbourhood
- Location in Turkey
- Coordinates: 39°36′04″N 41°57′43″E
- Country: Turkey
- Province: Erzurum
- District: Karayazı
- Population (2022): 578
- Time zone: UTC+3 (TRT)

Çavuşköy is a neighbourhood in the municipality and district of Karayazı, Erzurum Province in Turkey. Its population is 578 (2022).
