= Kırıkpınar, Karayazı =

Village in Turkey

Kırıkpınar
- Neighbourhood
- Location in Turkey
- Coordinates: 39°36′N 42°26′E
- Country: Turkey
- Province: Erzurum
- District: Karayazı
- Population (2022): 68
- Time zone: UTC+3 (TRT)

Kırıkpınar is a neighbourhood in the municipality and district of Karayazı, Erzurum Province in Turkey. Its population is 68 (2022).
