= Kazbel, Karayazı =

Village in Turkey

Kazbel
- Neighbourhood
- Location in Turkey
- Coordinates: 39°35′N 42°01′E
- Country: Turkey
- Province: Erzurum
- District: Karayazı
- Population (2022): 268
- Time zone: UTC+3 (TRT)

Kazbel is a neighbourhood in the municipality and district of Karayazı, Erzurum Province in Turkey. Its population is 268 (2022).
