= Aydınsu, Karayazı =

Village in Turkey

Aydınsu
- Neighbourhood
- Location in Turkey
- Coordinates: 39°30′42″N 42°19′43″E
- Country: Turkey
- Province: Erzurum
- District: Karayazı
- Population (2022): 283
- Time zone: UTC+3 (TRT)

Aydınsu is a neighbourhood in the municipality and district of Karayazı, Erzurum Province in Turkey. Its population is 283 (2022).
