= Çalışkan, Karayazı =

Village in Turkey

Çalışkan
- Neighbourhood
- Location in Turkey
- Coordinates: 39.615°N 42.462°E
- Country: Turkey
- Province: Erzurum
- District: Karayazı
- Population (2022): 64
- Time zone: UTC+3 (TRT)

Çalışkan is a neighbourhood in the municipality and district of Karayazı, Erzurum Province in Turkey. Its population is 64 (2022).
