= Sancaktar, Karayazı =

Village in Turkey

Sancaktar
- Neighbourhood
- Location in Turkey
- Coordinates: 39°30′58″N 42°00′23″E
- Country: Turkey
- Province: Erzurum
- District: Karayazı
- Population (2022): 167
- Time zone: UTC+3 (TRT)

Sancaktar is a neighbourhood in the municipality and district of Karayazı, Erzurum Province in Turkey. Its population is 167 (2022).
