= Alemdağı, Karayazı =

Village in Turkey

Alemdağı
- Neighbourhood
- Location in Turkey
- Coordinates: 39°36′41″N 41°53′37″E
- Country: Turkey
- Province: Erzurum
- District: Karayazı
- Population (2022): 403
- Time zone: UTC+3 (TRT)

Alemdağı is a neighbourhood in the municipality and district of Karayazı, Erzurum Province in Turkey. Its population is 403 (2022).
