= Payveren, Karayazı =

Village in Turkey

Payveren
- Neighbourhood
- Location in Turkey
- Coordinates: 39°44′40″N 41°55′24″E
- Country: Turkey
- Province: Erzurum
- District: Karayazı
- Population (2022): 288
- Time zone: UTC+3 (TRT)

Payveren is a neighbourhood in the municipality and district of Karayazı, Erzurum Province in Turkey. Its population is 288 (2022).
