= Aşağıincesu, Karayazı =

Village in Turkey

Aşağıincesu
- Neighbourhood
- Location in Turkey
- Coordinates: 39.6678°N 41.9876°E
- Country: Turkey
- Province: Erzurum
- District: Karayazı
- Population (2022): 526
- Time zone: UTC+3 (TRT)

Aşağıincesu is a neighbourhood in the municipality and district of Karayazı, Erzurum Province in Turkey. Its population is 526 (2022).
