= Geventepe, Karayazı =

Village in Turkey

Geventepe
- Neighbourhood
- Location in Turkey
- Coordinates: 39°32′07″N 42°15′42″E
- Country: Turkey
- Province: Erzurum
- District: Karayazı
- Population (2022): 104
- Time zone: UTC+3 (TRT)

Geventepe is a neighbourhood in the municipality and district of Karayazı, Erzurum Province in Turkey. Its population is 104 (2022).
