= Anıtlı, Karayazı =

Village in Turkey

Anıtlı
- Neighbourhood
- Location in Turkey
- Coordinates: 39.8025°N 42.2679°E
- Country: Turkey
- Province: Erzurum
- District: Karayazı
- Population (2022): 398
- Time zone: UTC+3 (TRT)

Anıtlı is a neighbourhood in the municipality and district of Karayazı, Erzurum Province in Turkey. Its population is 398 (2022).
