= Aliküllek, Karayazı =

Village in Turkey

Aliküllek
- Neighbourhood
- Location in Turkey
- Coordinates: 39.5040°N 42.2559°E
- Country: Turkey
- Province: Erzurum
- District: Karayazı
- Population (2022): 167
- Time zone: UTC+3 (TRT)

Aliküllek is a neighbourhood in the municipality and district of Karayazı, Erzurum Province, in Turkey. Its population is 167 (2022).
