= Şakirköy, Karayazı =

Village in Turkey

Şakirköy
- Neighbourhood
- Location in Turkey
- Coordinates: 39°30′47″N 42°05′53″E
- Country: Turkey
- Province: Erzurum
- District: Karayazı
- Population (2022): 246
- Time zone: UTC+3 (TRT)

Şakirköy is a neighbourhood in the municipality and district of Karayazı, Erzurum Province in Turkey. Its population is 246 (2022).
