= Rocío Arroyo =

Spanish athlete (born 2003)

Rocío Arroyo Soria
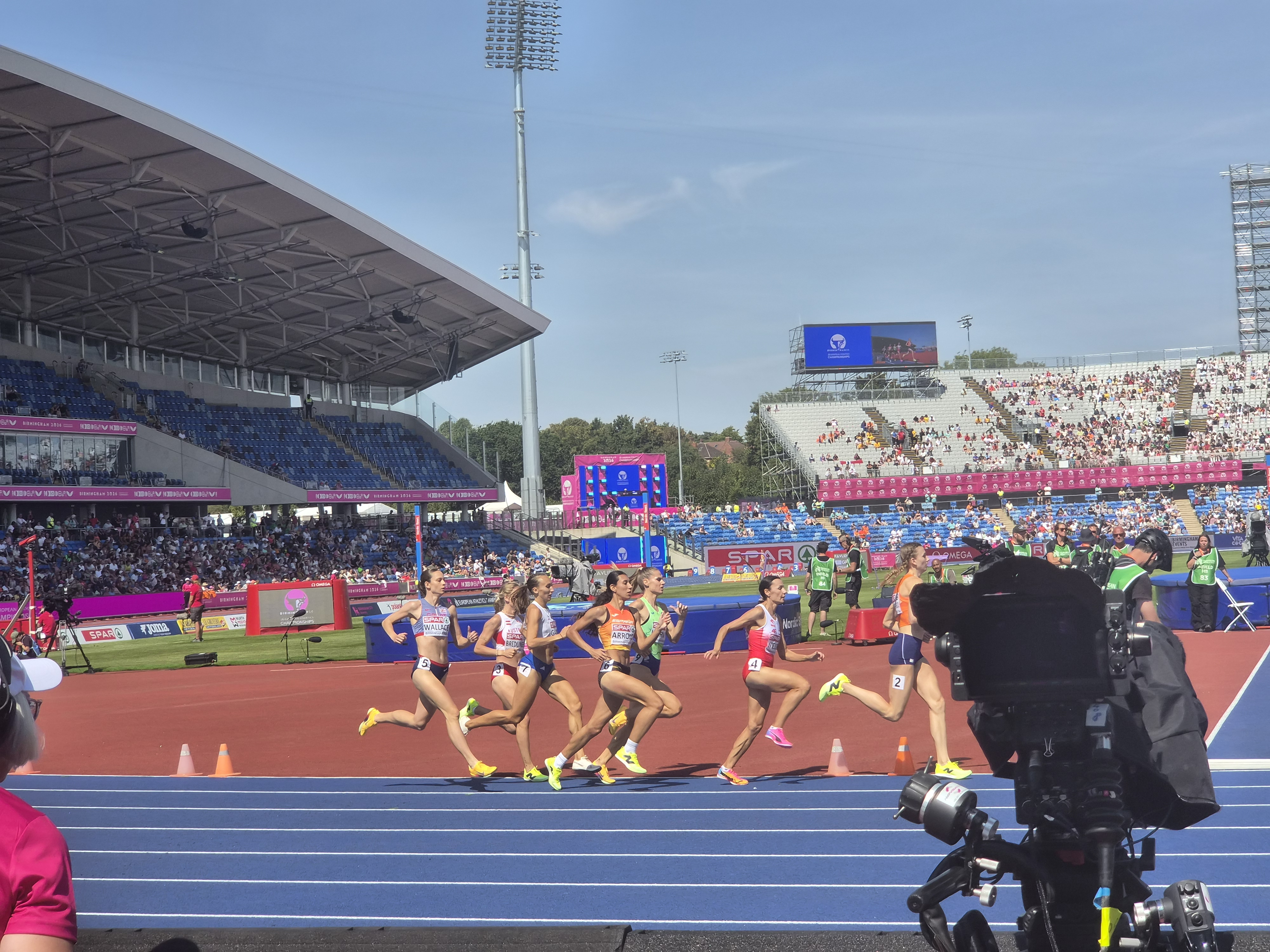
- Arroyo competing for Spain in 2026

Personal information
- Nationality: Spain
- Born: 6 July 2003 (age 23)
- Height: 180 cm (5 ft 11 in)

Sport
- Sport: Athletics
- Event: Middle distance running

Achievements and titles
- Personal bests: 800m: 1:59.17 (Oordegem, 2025); Indoor; 800m: 1:59.97 (Madrid, 2026)
Medal record
Women's athletics
Representing Spain
World Indoor Championships
| Bronze medal – third place | 2026 Toruń | 4 × 400 m relay |
World Relays
| Silver medal – second place | 2026 Gaborone | 4 × 400 m relay |
European U23 Championships
| Silver medal – second place | 2025 Bergen | 800m |
| Silver medal – second place | 2025 Bergen | 4x400 m relay |
| Bronze medal – third place | 2023 Espoo | 4x400 m relay |

Rocío Arroyo Soria (born 6 July 2003) is a Spanish sprinter and middle-distance runner. In 2025, she became Spanish under-23 national record holder, won the Spanish Athletics Championships and was silver medalist at the European U23 Championships, over 800 metres.

== Biography ==
She is a member of Athletics Club A.J. Alkala based in Alcalá de Henares, Spain. She set a Spanish under-23 record with her teammates Carmen Avilés, Berta Segura, and Blanca Hervás, in winning the bronze medal in the women's 4 x 400 metres relay at the 2023 European Athletics U23 Championships in Espoo, Finland. In 2024, she transitioned away from the 400 metres and towards middle-distance running.

She won the silver medal in the 800 metres behind Audrey Werro of Switzerland at the 2025 European Athletics U23 Championships in Bergen, Norway, in July 2025, running a time of 1:59.18 which the Spanish U-23 record, and moved her to third on the Spanish all-time list, after Maite Zúñiga and Mayte Martínez. Later in the championships, she won a silver medal anchoring the Spanish women's 4 x 400 metres relay team to a second place finish, behind Great Britain. In August 2025, she won the Spanish Athletics Championships title over 800 metres in a time of 2:01.01 in Tarragona. That month, she lowered her personal best for the 800 metres to 1:59.17 whilst racing in Oordegem, Belgium.

She made her major championship debut in September 2025, racing the women's 800 metres at the 2025 World Athletics Championships in Tokyo, Japan.

In February 2026, she ran an indoor personal best of 1:59.97 for the 800 metres at the Madrid World Indoor Tour Gold. Arroyo won the 800 metres at the 2026 Spanish Indoor Championships in Valencia, running 2:01.30. She ran at the 2026 World Athletics Indoor Championships in Toruń, Poland, advancing to the semi-finals of the 800 metres. Later at the championships, she won the bronze medal with the women's 4 x 400 m relay team. Competing at the 2026 World Athletics Relays, she ran as part of the women’s 4 x 400 m team which won their heat in 3:24.44, just 31 hundredths of a second shy of the Spanish record, and qualifying for the final. The following day, she ran as the Spanish quartet achieved a 3:21.25 national record to win the silver medal in the women’s 4 x 400m final. Competing at the 2026 European Athletics Championships in Birmingham, England, she was a semi-finalist in the 800 metres. She also competed in the women's 4 × 400 metres relay at the championships, as the Spain team placed fourth in the final.
