= Yalındal, Karayazı =

Village in Turkey

Yalındal
- Neighbourhood
- Country: Turkey
- Province: Erzurum
- District: Karayazı
- Population (2022): 217
- Time zone: UTC+3 (TRT)

Yalındal is a neighbourhood in the municipality and district of Karayazı, Erzurum Province in Turkey. Its population is 217 (2022).
