= Kurupınar, Karayazı =

Village in Turkey

Kurupınar
- Neighbourhood
- Location in Turkey
- Coordinates: 39°29′31″N 42°6′40″E
- Country: Turkey
- Province: Erzurum
- District: Karayazı
- Population (2022): 93
- Time zone: UTC+3 (TRT)

Kurupınar is a neighbourhood in the municipality and district of Karayazı, Erzurum Province in Turkey. Its population is 93 (2022).
