= Uğurdalı, Karayazı =

Village in Turkey

Uğurdalı
- Neighbourhood
- Location in Turkey
- Coordinates: 39°39′33″N 42°22′52″E
- Country: Turkey
- Province: Erzurum
- District: Karayazı
- Population (2022): 32
- Time zone: UTC+3 (TRT)

Uğurdalı is a neighbourhood in the municipality and district of Karayazı, Erzurum Province in Turkey. Its population is 32 (2022).
