= Karabey, Karayazı =

Village in Turkey

Karabey
- Neighbourhood
- Country: Turkey
- Province: Erzurum
- District: Karayazı
- Population (2022): 137
- Time zone: UTC+3 (TRT)

Karabey is a neighbourhood in the municipality and district of Karayazı, Erzurum Province in Turkey. Its population is 137 (2022).
