= Hacıbayram, Karayazı =

Village in Turkey

Hacıbayram
- Neighbourhood
- Location in Turkey
- Coordinates: 39.4922°N 42.0439°E
- Country: Turkey
- Province: Erzurum
- District: Karayazı
- Population (2022): 204
- Time zone: UTC+3 (TRT)

Hacıbayram is a neighbourhood in the municipality and district of Karayazı, Erzurum Province in Turkey. Its population is 204 (2022).
