= Sulutaş, Karayazı =

Village in Turkey

Sulutaş
- Neighbourhood
- Location within Turkey
- Country: Turkey
- Province: Erzurum
- District: Karayazı
- Population (2022): 157
- Time zone: UTC+3 (TRT)

Sulutaş is a neighbourhood in the municipality and district of Karayazı, Erzurum Province in Turkey. Its population is 157 (2022).
