= Karakale, Karayazı =

Village in Turkey

Karakale
- Neighbourhood
- Country: Turkey
- Province: Erzurum
- District: Karayazı
- Population (2022): 181
- Time zone: UTC+3 (TRT)

Karakale is a neighbourhood in the municipality and district of Karayazı, Erzurum Province in Turkey. Its population is 181 (2022).
