= Akpınar, Karayazı =

Village in Turkey

Akpınar
- Neighbourhood
- Location in Turkey
- Coordinates: 39.6149°N 42.3467°E
- Country: Turkey
- Province: Erzurum
- District: Karayazı
- Population (2022): 34
- Time zone: UTC+3 (TRT)

Akpınar is a neighbourhood in the municipality and district of Karayazı, Erzurum Province in Turkey. Its population is 34 (2022).
