= Yücelik, Karayazı =

Village in Turkey

Yücelik
- Neighbourhood
- Location in Turkey
- Coordinates: 39°45′N 42°06′E
- Country: Turkey
- Province: Erzurum
- District: Karayazı
- Population (2022): 408
- Time zone: UTC+3 (TRT)

Yücelik is a neighbourhood in the municipality and district of Karayazı, Erzurum Province in Turkey. Its population is 408 (2022).
