= Yukarısöylemez, Karayazı =

Village in Turkey

Yukarısöylemez
- Neighbourhood
- Location in Turkey
- Coordinates: 39°37′N 41°51′E
- Country: Turkey
- Province: Erzurum
- District: Karayazı
- Population (2022): 229
- Time zone: UTC+3 (TRT)

Yukarısöylemez is a neighbourhood in the municipality and district of Karayazı, Erzurum Province in Turkey. Its population is 229 (2022).
