= Çakmaközü, Karayazı =

Village in Turkey

Çakmaközü
- Neighbourhood
- Location in Turkey
- Coordinates: 39.653°N 42.278°E
- Country: Turkey
- Province: Erzurum
- District: Karayazı
- Population (2022): 245
- Time zone: UTC+3 (TRT)

Çakmaközü is a neighbourhood in the municipality and district of Karayazı, Erzurum Province in Turkey. Its population is 245 (2022).
