= Aşağısöylemez, Karayazı =

Village in Turkey

Aşağısöylemez
- Neighbourhood
- Location in Turkey
- Coordinates: 39°38′N 41°48′E
- Country: Turkey
- Province: Erzurum
- District: Karayazı
- Population (2022): 797
- Time zone: UTC+3 (TRT)

Aşağısöylemez is a neighbourhood in Karayazı district of Erzurum Province in Turkey. Its population was 797 2022.
