= Kösehasan, Karayazı =

Village in Turkey

Kösehasan
- Neighbourhood
- Location within Turkey
- Country: Turkey
- Province: Erzurum
- District: Karayazı
- Population (2022): 237
- Time zone: UTC+3 (TRT)

Kösehasan is a neighbourhood in the municipality and district of Karayazı, Erzurum Province in Turkey. Its population is 237 (2022).

== History ==
The settlement has borne the same name since 1928. In 2012, following the enactment of Law No. 6360, the legal status of all villages in Turkey was abolished. As a result, the village became a neighbourhood of the Karayazı municipality.
