= Selenli, Karayazı =

Village in Turkey

Selenli
- Neighbourhood
- Location in Turkey
- Coordinates: 39°33′52″N 42°27′14″E
- Country: Turkey
- Province: Erzurum
- District: Karayazı
- Population (2022): 391
- Time zone: UTC+3 (TRT)

Selenli is a neighbourhood in the municipality and district of Karayazı, Erzurum Province in Turkey. Its population is 391 (2022).
