= Dündarköy, Karayazı =

Village in Turkey

Dündarköy
- Neighbourhood
- Country: Turkey
- Province: Erzurum
- District: Karayazı
- Population (2022): 164
- Time zone: UTC+3 (TRT)

Dündarköy is a neighbourhood in the municipality and district of Karayazı, Erzurum Province in Turkey. Its population is 164 (2022).
