= Değirmenkaya, Karayazı =

Village in Turkey

Değirmenkaya
- Neighbourhood
- Location in Turkey
- Coordinates: 39°27′11″N 42°09′58″E
- Country: Turkey
- Province: Erzurum
- District: Karayazı
- Population (2022): 1,539
- Time zone: UTC+3 (TRT)

Değirmenkaya is a neighbourhood in the municipality and district of Karayazı, Erzurum Province in Turkey. Its population is 1,539 (2022).
