= Sukonak, Karayazı =

Village in Turkey

Sukonak
- Neighbourhood
- Location in Turkey
- Coordinates: 39°40′N 42°26′E
- Country: Turkey
- Province: Erzurum
- District: Karayazı
- Population (2022): 303
- Time zone: UTC+3 (TRT)

Sukonak is a neighbourhood in the municipality and district of Karayazı, Erzurum Province in Turkey. Its population is 303 (2022).
