= Yukarıcihanbey, Karayazı =

Village in Turkey

Yukarıcihanbey
- Neighbourhood
- Location in Turkey
- Coordinates: 39°47′36″N 42°14′34″E
- Country: Turkey
- Province: Erzurum
- District: Karayazı
- Population (2022): 213
- Time zone: UTC+3 (TRT)

Yukarıcihanbey is a neighbourhood in the municipality and district of Karayazı, Erzurum Province in Turkey. Its population is 213 (2022).
