= Yukarıçığılgan, Karayazı =

Village in Turkey

Yukarıçığılgan
- Neighbourhood
- Location in Turkey
- Coordinates: 39°42′N 41°53′E
- Country: Turkey
- Province: Erzurum
- District: Karayazı
- Population (2022): 235
- Time zone: UTC+3 (TRT)

Yukarıçığılgan is a neighbourhood in the municipality and district of Karayazı, Erzurum Province in Turkey. Its population is 235 (2022).
