= Köyceğiz, Karayazı =

Village in Turkey

Köyceğiz
- Neighbourhood
- Country: Turkey
- Province: Erzurum
- District: Karayazı
- Population (2022): 656
- Time zone: UTC+3 (TRT)

Köyceğiz is a neighbourhood in the municipality and district of Karayazı, Erzurum Province in Turkey. Its population is 656 (2022).

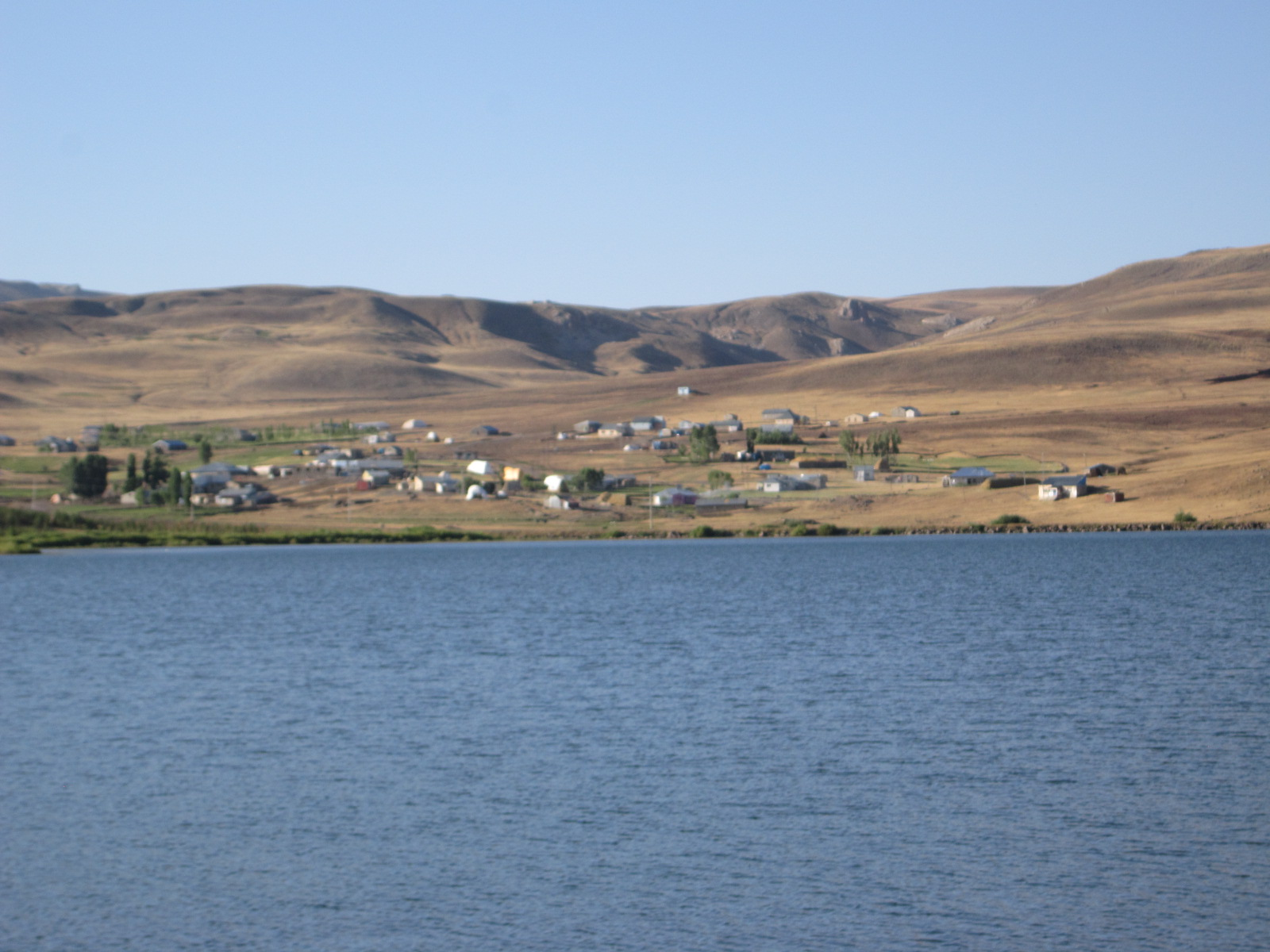
Köyceğiz Reservoir
