= Bezirhane, Karayazı =

Village in Turkey

Bezirhane
- Neighbourhood
- Location in Turkey
- Coordinates: 39.7114°N 42.0882°E
- Country: Turkey
- Province: Erzurum
- District: Karayazı
- Population (2022): 108
- Time zone: UTC+3 (TRT)

Bezirhane is a neighbourhood in the municipality and district of Karayazı, Erzurum Province in Turkey. Its population is 108 (2022).
