= Julia Jaguścik =

Polish middle-distance runner (born 2003)

Personal information
- Born: 16 December 2003 (age 22)

Sport
- Sport: Athletics
- Event: Middle-distance running

Achievements and titles
- Personal best(s): 800m: 2:01.10 (2025); 1500m: 4:12.82 (2026)

Julia Jaguścik (born 16 December 2003) is a Polish middle-distance runner. She was selected for the 800 metres at the 2026 World Athletics Indoor Championships.

== Biography ==
From Radomsko, she is a member of AZS AWF Warszawa. In 2020, she was Polish under-20 champion over 3000 metres, both indoors and outdoors.

In July 2025, she won the Polish U23 Championships over 800 metres. That month, set a personal best time of 2:02.20 in placing fifth over 800 metres at the 2025 European Athletics U23 Championships in Bergen, Norway.

In February 2026, she set an indoor personal best of 2:01.60 at the Orlen Copernicus Cup meeting in Toruń. She placed second over 800 metres at the 2026 Polish Indoor Championships, running 2:03.53. She represented Poland at the 2026 World Athletics Indoor Championships in Toruń, without advancing to the semi-finals of the 800 metres.
