= Karayazı =

- District and municipality
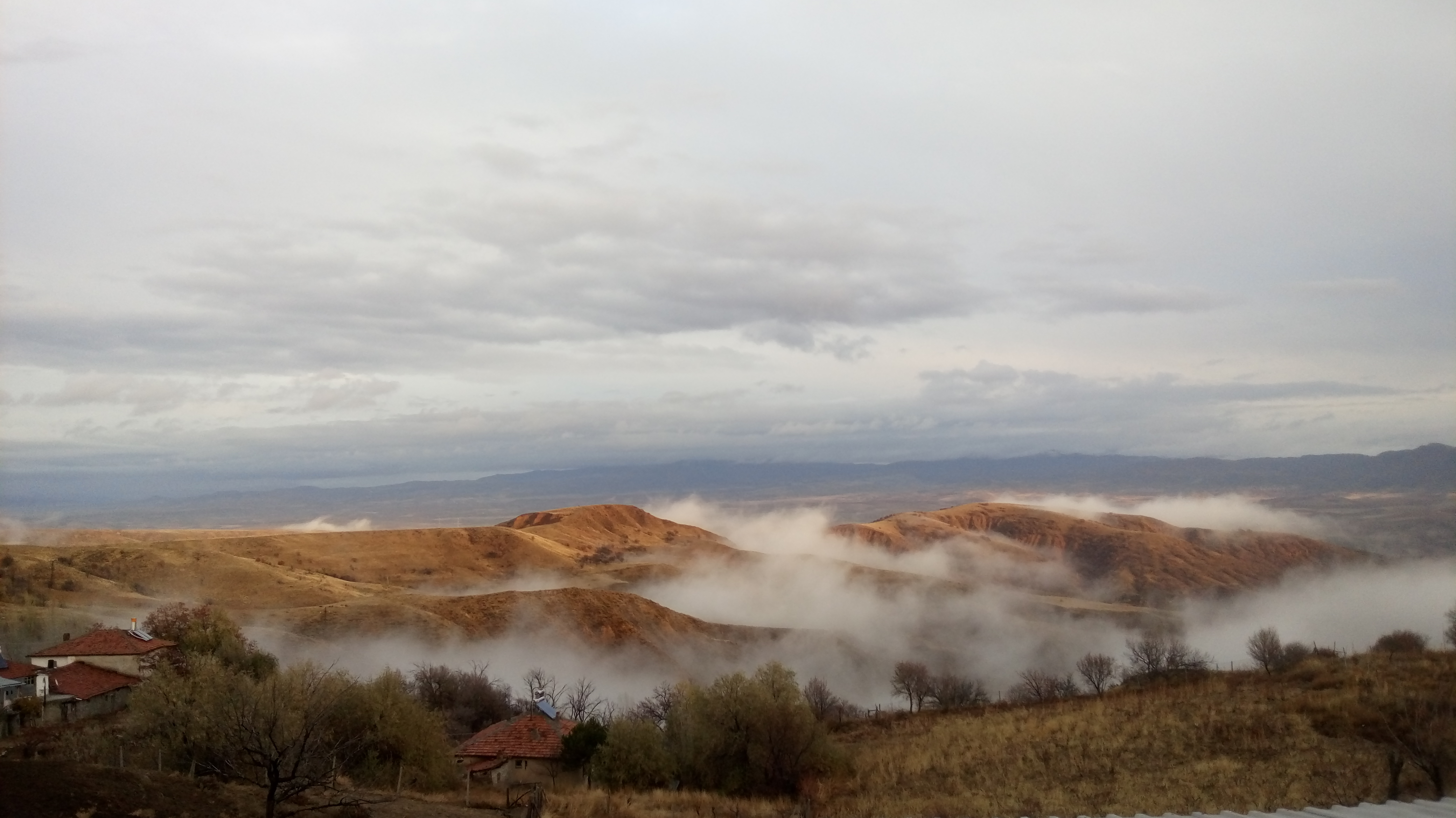
- mountains of Karayazı

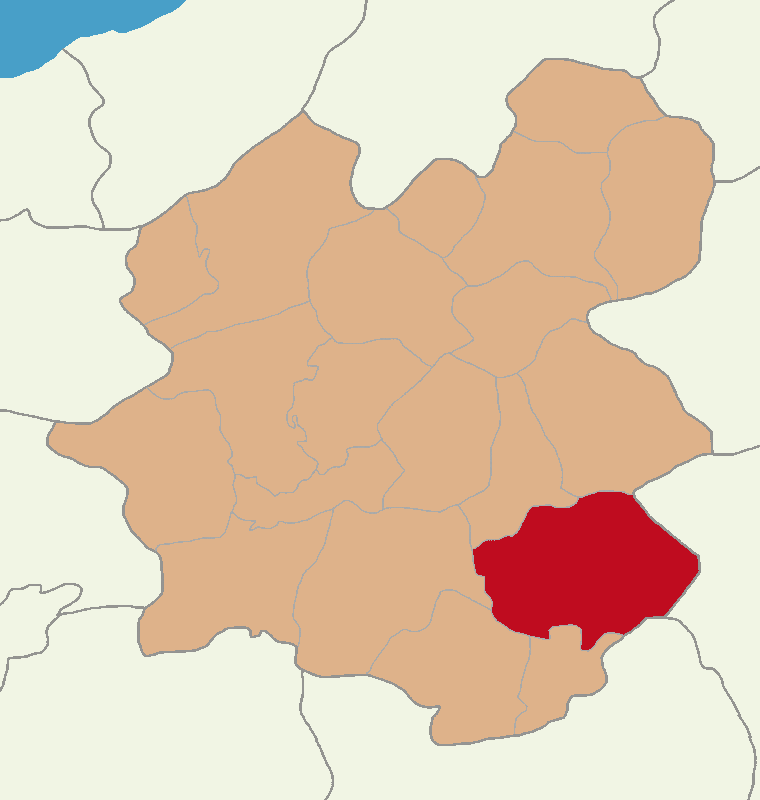
- Map showing Karayazı District in Erzurum Province

- Location within Turkey
- Coordinates: 39°42′14″N 42°08′55″E
- Country: Turkey
- Province: Erzurum
- Area: 1,953 km^{2} (754 sq mi)
- Elevation: 2,300 m (7,500 ft)
- Population (2022): 25,543
  - Density: 13.08/km^{2} (33.87/sq mi)
- Time zone: UTC+3 (TRT)
- Postal code: 25830
- Area code: 0442
- Climate: Dsb
- Website: www.karayazi.bel.tr

Karayazı (Kurdish: Qereyazî) is a municipality and district of Erzurum Province, Turkey. Its area is 1,953 km^{2}, and its population is 25,543 (2022). In March 2019 Melike Göksu (HDP) was elected mayor. On 17 September 2019 she was dismissed and arrested due to a sentence of 7 years and 6 months for terrorist propaganda. Kaymakam Mesut Tabakçıoğlu was appointed as a trustee instead.

== Composition ==
There are 75 neighbourhoods in Karayazı District:

- Abdurrahmanköy
- Ağaçlı
- Akarsu
- Akpınar
- Alemdağı
- Aliküllek
- Anıtlı
- Aşağıincesu
- Aşağısöylemez
- Aydınsu
- Bayraktar
- Bezirhane
- Çakmaközü
- Çalışkan
- Çaltılı
- Çatalören
- Çavuşköy
- Çayırbeyli
- Çelikli
- Çepi
- Değirmenkaya
- Dörtpınar
- Doruca
- Dündarköy
- Duruca
- Elmaağaç
- Geventepe
- Göksu
- Göktepe
- Güllü
- Hacıbayram
- Hasanova
- Kapanlı
- Karaağıl
- Karabey
- Karakale
- Karakaya
- Karasu
- Karşıyaka
- Kayalar
- Kazbel
- Kırgındere
- Kırıkpınar
- Kösehasan
- Köyceğiz
- Kurupınar
- Mollabekir
- Mollaosman
- Muratlı
- Payveren
- Şakirköy
- Salyamaç
- Sancaktar
- Sarıçiçek
- Selenli
- Sukonak
- Sulutaş
- Taşan
- Tosunlu
- Turnagöl
- Uğurdalı
- Ulucanlar
- Üzengili
- Yahyaköy
- Yalındal
- Yeni
- Yeniköy
- Yeşilova
- Yeşilyurt
- Yiğityolu
- Yolgören
- Yücelik
- Yukarıçığılgan
- Yukarıcihanbey
- Yukarısöylemez

== Notable people ==
- Hozan Canê (*1971), German-Kurdish singer
