= Abigail Ives =

British athlete (born 2004)

Abbie Ives
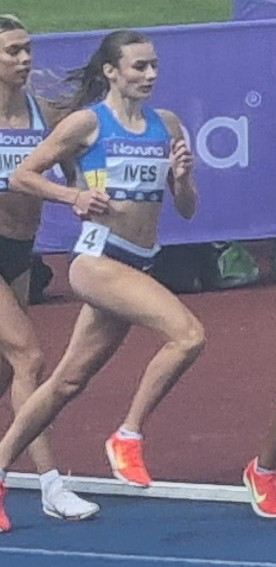
- 2025 UK Athletics Championships

Personal information
- Nationality: British
- Born: 6 February 2004 (age 22)

Sport
- Sport: Athletics
- Event: Middle distance running
- Club: Basildon AC

Achievements and titles
- Personal bests: 800m: 1:59.49 (Belfast, 2025); 1500m: 4:07.49 (Oordegem, 2025)
Medal record
Women's athletics
Representing Great Britain
European U23 Championships
Bronze medal – third place	2025 Bergen	800m
Gold medal – first place	2025 Bergen	4x400 m relay
European U20 Championships
Silver medal – second place	2023 Jerusalem	800m

Abigail Ives (born 6 February 2004) is a British middle-distance runner.

== Early life ==
From Essex, she is a member of Basildon Athletic Club. She won her first age-group county cross-country championships for Basildon AC in 2015 when she was 13 years old. She attended Coopers' Company and Coborn School in Upminster. In 2015, she won the individual age-group title at the National finals of the Cross-Country Cup in Bedford.

== Career ==
Ives is coached by British former steeplechase runner Luke Gunn.

=== 2022 ===
She was selected to represent Britain at the 2022 World Athletics U20 Championships. She went into the championship with an 800 metres best of 2:01.88. She won her semifinal with a run of 2:01.92, before going on to place sixth in the final.

=== 2023 ===
In February 2023, she won bronze at the 2023 British Indoor Athletics Championships in Birmingham over 800 metres. In May 2023, she ran a 800 metres personal best time of 1:59.92 in Belfast, becoming just the fourth British U20 athlete to break the two-minute barrier at the distance. In August 2023, she won silver at the 2023 European Athletics U20 Championships in Jerusalem in the 800 metres. She was later voted the Athletics Weekly British Female Under-20 Athlete of the Year.

=== 2024 ===
In May 2024, she won the British Universities and Colleges Sport (BUCS) 800 metres title, competing for the University of Birmingham. In November 2024, she was named by British Athletics on the Olympic Futures Programme for 2025.

=== 2025 ===
In May 2025, she lowered her personal best to 1:59.49 in winning the Belfast Milers event in Northern Ireland. She ran a 400 metres personal best of 54.29 in Birmingham in June 2025. She was selected for the 800 metres at the 2025 European Athletics Team Championships in Madrid on 28 June 2025, placing sixth overall on her senior international debut in a time of 2:00.48.

She was named in the British team for the 2025 European Athletics U23 Championships in Bergen, Norway, where she reached the final with a winning time of 2:02.19 in her heat before winning the bronze medal in the final. Later in the championships, she won a gold medal as part of the women’s 4 x 400 metres relay team. On 3 August, she placed third in the final of the 800 metres at the 2025 UK Athletics Championships in Birmingham, finishing behind Jemma Reekie and Georgia Hunter Bell. In October 2025, she was named on the British Athletics Olympic Futures Programme for 2025/26.

=== 2026 ===
Ives ran 2:02.07 indoors at Lee Valley in February 2026, finish ahead of Lyla Belshaw. That month, she was a finalist over 1500 metres at the 2026 British Indoor Athletics Championships in Birmingham, placing seventh overall.

== Personal life ==
Her older sister Isobel Ives also competes as a middle-distance runner, combining it with work as a civil engineer in Chelmsford.
