= Çepi, Karayazı =

Village in Turkey

Çepi
- Neighbourhood
- Location in Turkey
- Coordinates: 39°38′55″N 42°08′40″E
- Country: Turkey
- Province: Erzurum
- District: Karayazı
- Population (2022): 222
- Time zone: UTC+3 (TRT)

Çepi is a neighbourhood in the municipality and district of Karayazı, Erzurum Province in Turkey. Its population is 222 (2022).
