= Doruca, Karayazı =

Village in Turkey

Doruca
- Neighbourhood
- Location in Turkey
- Coordinates: 39.546°N 42.282°E
- Country: Turkey
- Province: Erzurum
- District: Karayazı
- Population (2022): 69
- Time zone: UTC+3 (TRT)

Doruca is a neighbourhood in the municipality and district of Karayazı, Erzurum Province in Turkey. Its population is 69 (2022).
