= Čepí =

- Municipality
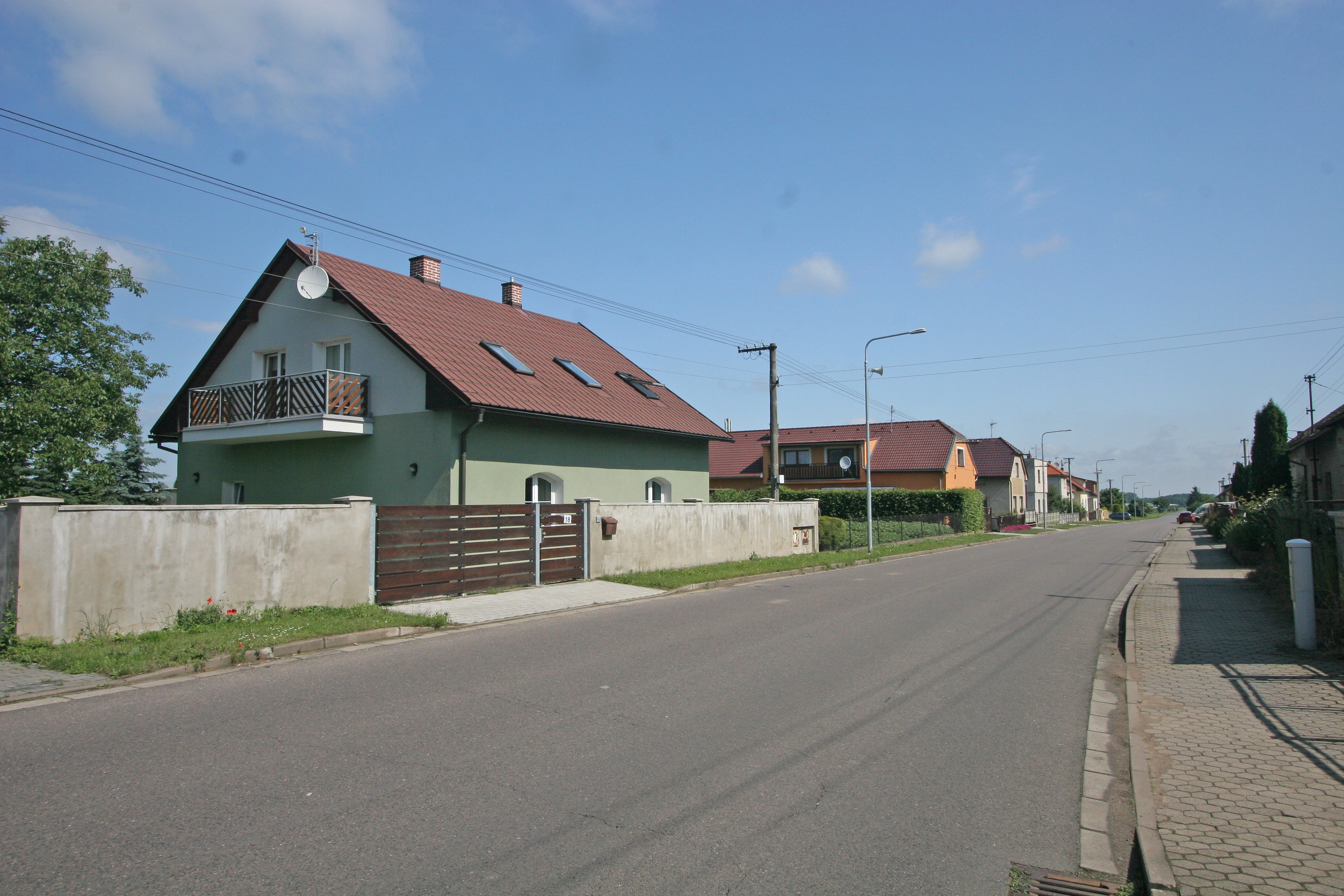
- Street in Čepí

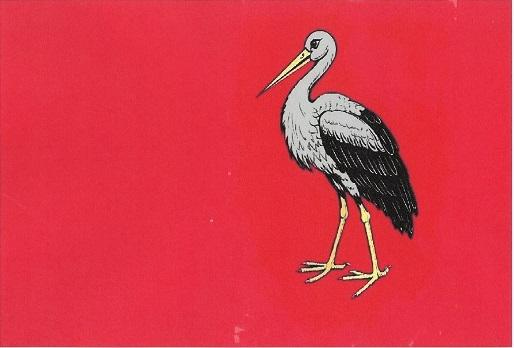
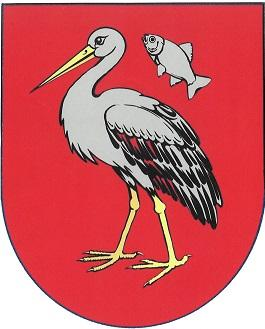
- Flag Coat of arms

- Location in the Czech Republic
- Coordinates: 49°59′7″N 15°43′3″E
- Country: Czech Republic
- Region: Pardubice
- District: Pardubice
- First mentioned: 1375

Area
  - Total: 2.48 km^{2} (0.96 sq mi)
- Elevation: 247 m (810 ft)

Population (2026-01-01)
  - Total: 475
  - Density: 192/km^{2} (496/sq mi)
- Time zone: UTC+1 (CET)
  - Summer (DST): UTC+2 (CEST)
- Postal code: 533 32
- Website: www.cepi.cz

Čepí is a municipality and village in Pardubice District in the Pardubice Region of the Czech Republic. It has about 500 inhabitants.

== Demographics ==
Historical population
Year	Pop.	±%
1869	220	—
1880	221	+0.5%
1890	252	+14.0%
1900	323	+28.2%
1910	470	+45.5%
1921	457	−2.8%
1930	458	+0.2%
1950	310	−32.3%
1961	414	+33.5%
1970	370	−10.6%
1980	405	+9.5%
1991	404	−0.2%
2001	410	+1.5%
2011	401	−2.2%
2021	448	+11.7%
Source: Censuses
