= Üzengili, Karayazı =

Village in Turkey

Üzengili
- Neighbourhood
- Country: Turkey
- Province: Erzurum
- District: Karayazı
- Population (2022): 624
- Time zone: UTC+3 (TRT)

Üzengili is a neighbourhood in the municipality and district of Karayazı, Erzurum Province in Turkey. Its population is 624 (2022).

== Notable natives ==
- Dilek Koçak, middle distance athlete
