= Roisin Willis =

American athlete (born 2004)

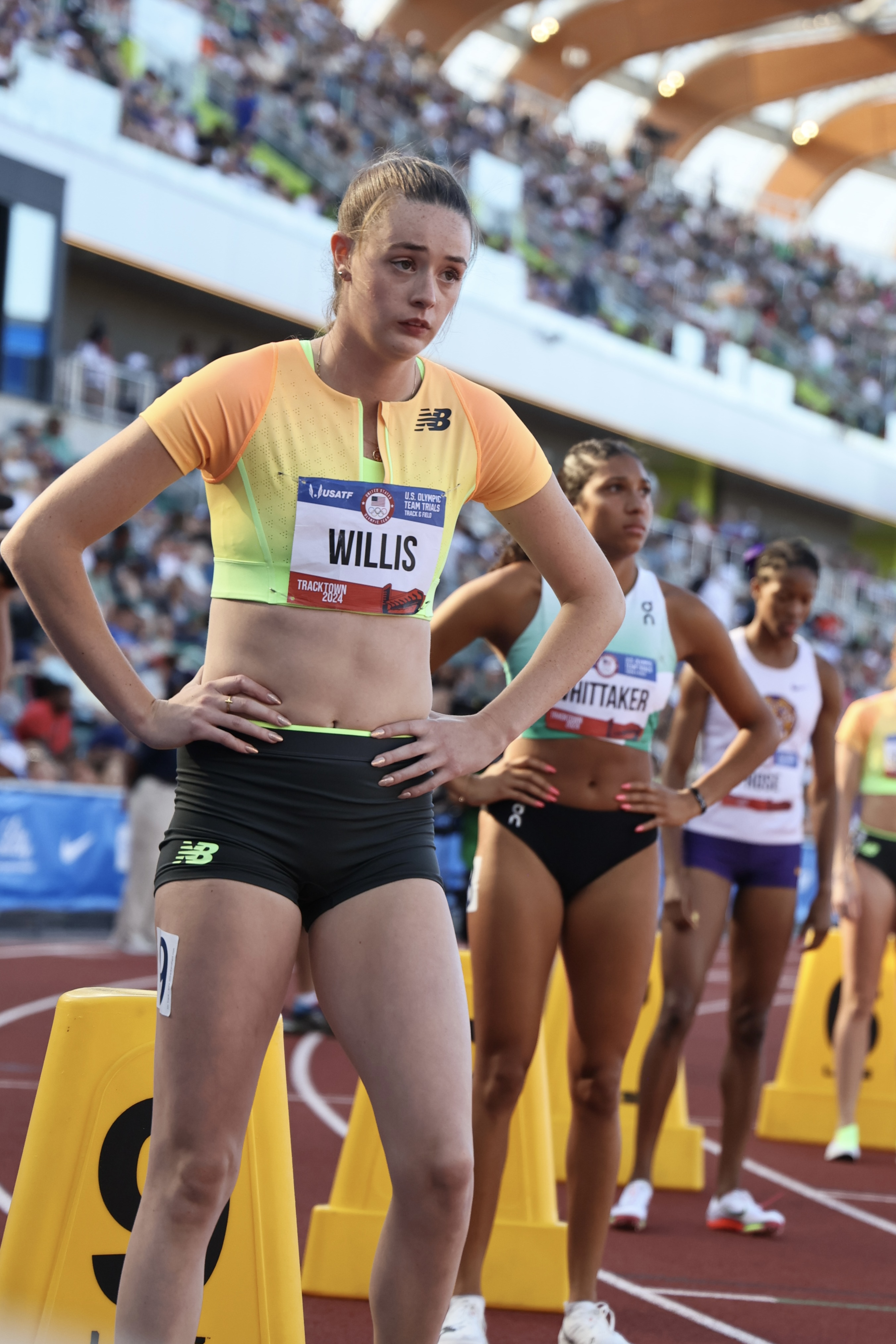
- Willis at the 2024 United States Olympic trials

Personal information
- Nationality: American
- Born: August 6, 2004 (age 22) Stevens Point, Wisconsin, U.S.

Sport
- Sport: Track and field
- Event: Middle-distance running
- College team: Stanford Cardinal

Achievements and titles
- Personal bests: Outdoors; 800 m: 1:57.56 (Stockholm 2026); Indoors; 800 m: 1:57.97 (Boston 2026) NR AR; 1000 m: 2:41.53 AU18B (Chicago 2021)
Medal record
Women's athletics
Representing United States
World U20 Championships
| Gold medal – first place | 2022 Cali | 800 m |
| Gold medal – first place | 2022 Cali | 4x400 m relay |

Roisin Willis (born August 6, 2004) is an American middle-distance runner. She won the 800 meters at the 2025 USA Outdoor Track and Field Championships, having previously won gold medals at the 2022 World Under-20 Championships in the women's 800 metres and the 4x400 m relay.

Willis is a two-time NCAA champion in the 800 metres.

== Early and personal life ==
Her mother is Irish track athlete Breeda Dennehy-Willis, who competed at the 2000 Sydney Olympics. Willis attended Stevens Point Area Senior High School in Wisconsin. She attended Stanford University, where she participated in cross country and track and field.

== Career ==
=== Early career: World U20 Champion ===
Willis was successful as a high-school athlete. She is the U.S. high-school indoor 800 meters record holder. Her outdoor mark of 2:00.78 recorded in 2021 is a U.S. under-18 record. She holds Wisconsin state records in 400 m, 800 m and 1600 m. Willis qualified to run in the 2020 US Olympic trials at Hayward Field in Eugene, Oregon, after running 2:00.78 for the 800 m at the Trials of Miles New York City. At the Olympic trials she reached the semi-finals, finishing 13th.

She took silver in the 800 m at the 2022 USATF U20 Outdoor Championships, Two months later, she won the event at the World U20 Championships held in Cali, Colombia, breaking the championship record with a personal best of 1:59.13, her first time under two minutes. She added gold for the women's 4 x 400 m relay with an official split time of 51.34.

=== Collegiate career: Double NCAA champion ===
As a freshman at Stanford, Willis won the 800m in a time of 1:59.93 at the 2023 NCAA Indoor T&F Championships in Albuquerque, NM, setting a personal best, and meet and facility records in the process. She was also a member of the Stanford team that won the distance medley relay. That same year at the NCAA Outdoor T&F Championships she finished 4th in the 800m. Following her freshman year, she signed an NIL deal with New Balance prior to competing at the US Track and Field Championships.

She won the 2025 NCAA Outdoor Championships in Eugene, Oregon, running 1:58.13, a new meeting record, which moved her to third on the all-time NCAA list, behind only Athing Mu and Michaela Rose.

=== 2025: USA Champion, turning professional ===
She won the women's 800 metres title at the 2025 USA Outdoor Track and Field Championships, winning her semi-final in 1:58.40 and then triumphing in the final in 1:59.26. She competed in the women's 800 metres at the 2025 World Athletics Championships in Tokyo, Japan, without advancing to the semi-finals.

In December 2025, Willis announced she would forego her final year of NCAA eligibility to run professionally.

=== 2026 ===
On 24 January 2026, Willis won her debut race as a professional with an indoor personal best in the 800m winning in 1:59.59 at the Indoor Grand Prix, in Boston. The following week, Willis lowered the American indoor record for the 800 metres with 1:57.97 at the BU Terrier Classic in Boston. It was the first time Willis had run sub-1:58, indoors or out. On 1 February, Willis won over 600 metres at the Millrose Games in a personal best 1:24.87. Willis ran 1:58.08 to win over 800 metres at the LA Track Fest on 23 May 2026. On 7 June, Willis ran a personal best 1:57.56 as she finished third at the 2026 Bauhausgalan in Stockholm, part of the 2026 Diamond League. In September, she competed over 800 m at the inaugural World Ultimate Championship in Budapest.

== Achievements ==
=== Senior ===
- USA Outdoor Track and Field Championships
  - 800 meters: 2025

=== NCAA titles ===
- NCAA Division I Women's Indoor Track and Field Championships
  - 800 meters: 2023, 2025
  - Distance medley relay: 2023

=== Junior ===
- World Athletics U20 Championships
  - 800 meters: 2022
  - 4 x 400 metres relay: 2022
