= Qaradeyin =

Qaradeyin or Karadein or Karadigin may refer to:

- Qaradeyin, Agdash, Azerbaijan
- Qaradeyin, Qabala, Azerbaijan
- Karadiğin, Erzincan
