= List of municipalities in Erzincan Province =

Municipalities in Turkish province

This is the List of municipalities in Erzincan Province, Turkey as of March 2023.

District	Municipality
Çayırlı	Çayırlı
Erzincan	Çağlayan
Erzincan	Erzincan
Erzincan	Mollaköy
İliç	İliç
Kemah	Kemah
Kemaliye	Kemaliye
Otlukbeli	Otlukbeli
Refahiye	Refahiye
Tercan	Çadırkaya
Tercan	Kargın
Tercan	Mercan
Tercan	Tercan
Üzümlü	Altınbaşak
Üzümlü	Üzümlü
