= Kilimli (disambiguation) =

Kilimli can refer to:

- Kilimli
- Kilimli, Erzincan
- Kilimli, Narman
- Kilimli, Sason
