= Sütpınar =

Sütpınar can refer to:

- Sütpınar, Erzincan
- Sütpınar, Narman
