= Çubuklu (disambiguation) =

Çubuklu can refer to:

- Çubuklu
- Çubuklu, Erzincan
- Çubuklu, Sur
- Çubuklu, Ulus
