= Heybeli =

Heybeli can refer to:

- Heybeli, Adilcevaz
- Heybeli, Erzincan
- Heybeli, Sason
- Heybeliada, an island in the Sea of Marmara near Istanbul
