= Göllü =

Göllü may refer to:

- Göllü, Ağaçören, village in Aksaray Province, Turkey
- Göllü Dağ, lava dome in Turkey
- Arzu Göllü, Turkish volleyball player
- Göllü, Narman
