= Koçkaya =

Koçkaya can refer to:

- Koçkaya, Narman
- Koçkaya, Refahiye
- Koçkaya, Sason
