= Baltasi (disambiguation) =

Baltasi can refer to:

- Baltasi
- Baltaşı, Erzincan
- Baltaşı, Palu
