= Tuztaşı =

Tuztaşı can refer to:

- Tuztaşı, Ayvacık
- Tuztaşı, Narman
