= Caferli =

Caferli can refer to:

- Caferli, Erzincan
- Caferli, Kuşadası
