= Yeşilçay =

Yeşilçay can refer to:

- Yeşilçay, Erzincan
- Nurgül Yeşilçay
