= Pınaryolu =

Pınaryolu can refer to:

- Pınaryolu, Narman
- Pınaryolu, Refahiye
