= Serinsu =

Serinsu can refer to:

- Serinsu, Narman
- Serinsu, Yusufeli
