= Ağılözü =

Ağılözü can refer to:

- Ağılözü, Erzincan
- Ağılözü, Kurşunlu
