= Günbağı =

Günbağı can refer to:

- Günbağı, Elâzığ
- Günbağı, Erzincan
