= Tatlısu =

Tatlısu can refer to:

- Tatlısu, Erzincan
- Tatlısu, Sungurlu
- Tatlısu Halk Odası Beylerbeyi S.K.
- the Turkish name for Akanthou
