= Elmaköy, Erzincan =

Village in Erzincan Province, Turkey

Elmaköy
- Village
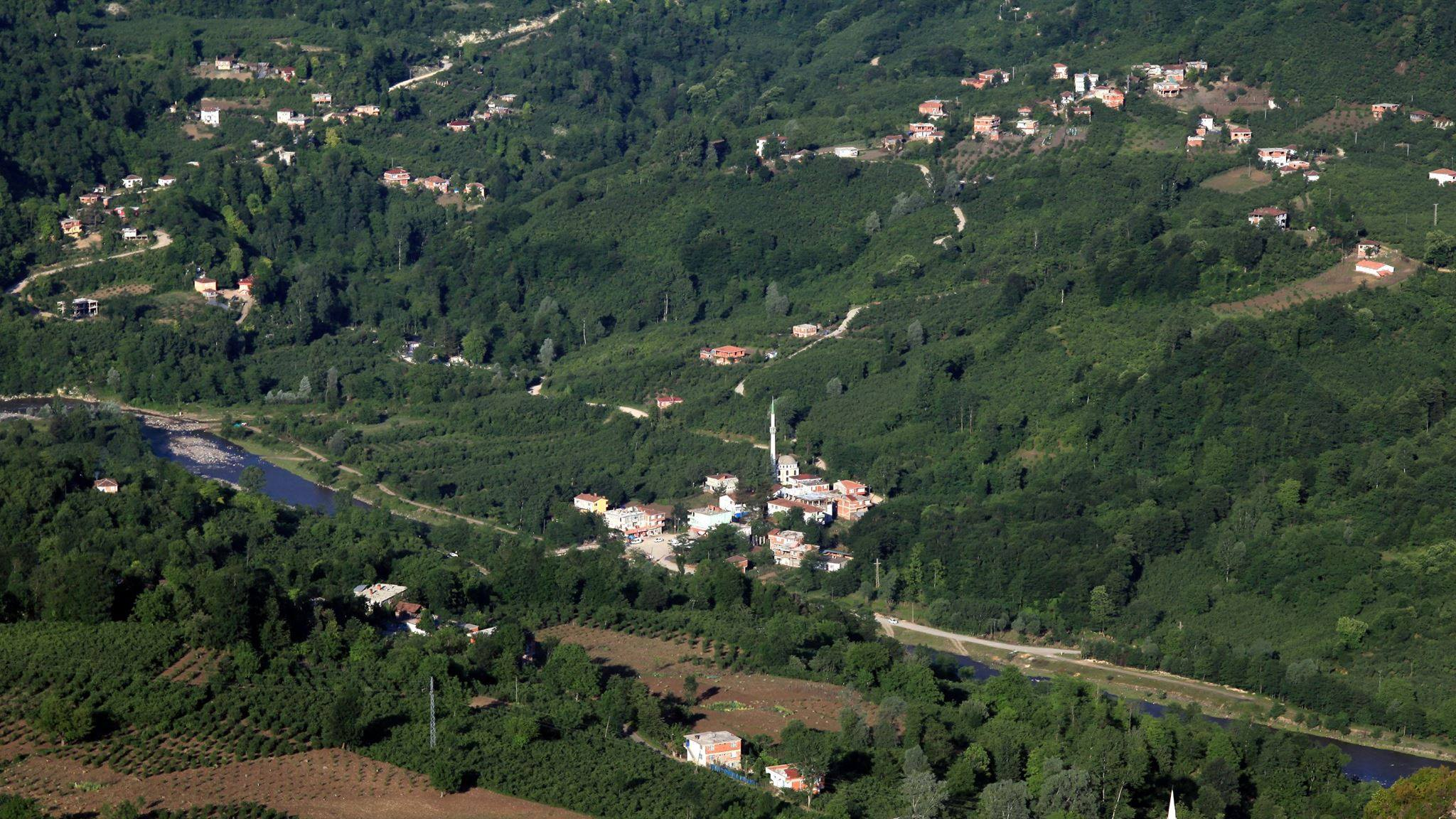

- Location within Turkey
- Coordinates: 39.788°N 39.353°E
- Country: Turkey
- Province: Erzincan
- District: Erzincan
- Population (2021): 136
- Time zone: UTC+3 (TRT)

Elmaköy is a village in the Erzincan District, Erzincan Province, Turkey. The village had a population of 136 in 2021.
