= Sazlıpınar, Erzincan =

Village in Erzincan Province, Turkey

Sazlıpınar
- Village
- Location within Turkey
- Coordinates: 39.641°N 39.632°E
- Country: Turkey
- Province: Erzincan
- District: Erzincan
- Population (2021): 109
- Time zone: UTC+3 (TRT)

Sazlıpınar is a village in the Erzincan District, Erzincan Province, Turkey.

== Demographics ==
The village is populated by Kurds of the Keçelan tribe and had a population of 109 in 2021.
