= Ilıdere, Erzincan =

Village in Erzincan Province, Turkey

Ilıdere
- Village
- Location within Turkey
- Coordinates: 39°47′48″N 39°19′7″E
- Country: Turkey
- Province: Erzincan
- District: Erzincan
- Population (2021): 52
- Time zone: UTC+3 (TRT)

Ilıdere (formerly Kitamana) is a village in the Erzincan District, Erzincan Province, Turkey. The village is populated by Kurds of the Kurmeş tribe and had a population of 52 in 2021.
