= Başkale, Narman =

Village in Turkey

Başkale
- Neighbourhood
- Location in Turkey
- Coordinates: 40.2138°N 41.7613°E
- Country: Turkey
- Province: Erzurum
- District: Narman
- Population (2022): 308
- Time zone: UTC+3 (TRT)

Başkale is a neighbourhood in the municipality and district of Narman, Erzurum Province in Turkey. Its population is 308 (2022).
