= Mahmutçavuş, Narman =

Village in Turkey

Mahmutçavuş
- Neighbourhood
- Location in Turkey
- Coordinates: 40°20′11″N 41°57′12″E
- Country: Turkey
- Province: Erzurum
- District: Narman
- Population (2022): 155
- Time zone: UTC+3 (TRT)

Mahmutçavuş is a neighbourhood in the municipality and district of Narman, Erzurum Province in Turkey. Its population is 155 (2022).
