= Hanidere, Erzincan =

Village in Turkey

Hanidere
- Village
- Location in Turkey
- Coordinates: 39°48′50″N 39°33′41″E
- Country: Turkey
- Province: Erzincan
- District: Erzincan
- Population (2022): 28
- Time zone: UTC+3 (TRT)

Hanidere (also: Handere) is a village in the Erzincan District of Erzincan Province in Turkey. Its population is 28 (2022).
