= Pınarönü, Erzincan =

Village in Erzincan Province, Turkey

Pınarönü
- Village
- Location within Turkey
- Coordinates: 39.676°N 39.437°E
- Country: Turkey
- Province: Erzincan
- District: Erzincan
- Population (2021): 171
- Time zone: UTC+3 (TRT)

Pınarönü (also known as Kürdkendi) is a village in the Erzincan District, Erzincan Province, Turkey. The village is populated by Kurds and had a population of 171 in 2021. The hamlets of Gözeler, Kızıl and Remo Kom are attached to the village.
