= Gölpınar, Erzincan =

Village in Turkey

Gölpınar
- Village
- Location in Turkey
- Coordinates: 39.670°N 39.465°E
- Country: Turkey
- Province: Erzincan
- District: Erzincan
- Population (2022): 173
- Time zone: UTC+3 (TRT)

Gölpınar is a village in the Erzincan District of Erzincan Province in Turkey. Its population is 173 (2022).
