= Oğlaktepe, Erzincan =

Village in Turkey

Oğlaktepe
- Village
- Location in Turkey
- Coordinates: 39°44′N 39°24′E
- Country: Turkey
- Province: Erzincan
- District: Erzincan
- Population (2022): 184
- Time zone: UTC+3 (TRT)

Oğlaktepe is a village in the Erzincan District of Erzincan Province in Turkey. Its population is 184 (2022). Ali Kar is the current head of the village.
