= Koyunören, Narman =

Village in Turkey

Koyunören
- Neighbourhood
- Country: Turkey
- Province: Erzurum
- District: Narman
- Population (2022): 202
- Time zone: UTC+3 (TRT)

Koyunören is a neighbourhood in the municipality and district of Narman, Erzurum Province in Turkey. Its population is 202 (2022).
