= Kuruçalı, Narman =

Village in Turkey

Kuruçalı
- Neighbourhood
- Location in Turkey
- Coordinates: 40°23′36″N 41°54′26″E
- Country: Turkey
- Province: Erzurum
- District: Narman
- Population (2022): 183
- Time zone: UTC+3 (TRT)

Kuruçalı is a neighbourhood in the municipality and district of Narman, Erzurum Province in Turkey. Its population is 183 (2022).
