= Ürek, Erzincan =

Village in Erzincan Province, Turkey

Ürek
- Village
- Location within Turkey
- Coordinates: 39.615°N 39.594°E
- Country: Turkey
- Province: Erzincan
- District: Erzincan
- Population (2021): 113
- Time zone: UTC+3 (TRT)

Ürek is a village in the Erzincan District, Erzincan Province, Turkey. The village had a population of 113 in 2021.
