= Tandırlı, Erzincan =

Village in Turkey

Tandırlı
- Village
- Location in Turkey
- Coordinates: 39.784°N 39.262°E
- Country: Turkey
- Province: Erzincan
- District: Erzincan
- Population (2022): 45
- Time zone: UTC+3 (TRT)

Tandırlı is a village in the Erzincan District of Erzincan Province in Turkey. Its population is 45 (2022).
