= Aşağıyayla, Narman =

Village in Turkey

Aşağıyayla
- Neighbourhood
- Location in Turkey
- Coordinates: 40.2940°N 41.7986°E
- Country: Turkey
- Province: Erzurum
- District: Narman
- Population (2022): 47
- Time zone: UTC+3 (TRT)

Aşağıyayla is a neighbourhood in the municipality and district of Narman, Erzurum Province in Turkey. Its population is 47 (2022).
