= Çatalarmut, Erzincan =

Village in Turkey

Çatalarmut
- Village
- Location in Turkey
- Coordinates: 39°48′21″N 39°19′3″E
- Country: Turkey
- Province: Erzincan
- District: Erzincan
- Population (2022): 186
- Time zone: UTC+3 (TRT)

Çatalarmut is a village in the Erzincan District of Erzincan Province in Turkey. Its population is 186 (2022).
