= Hancıçiftliği, Erzincan =

Village in Erzincan Province, Turkey

Hancıçiftliği
- Village
- Location within Turkey
- Coordinates: 39.699°N 39.591°E
- Country: Turkey
- Province: Erzincan
- District: Erzincan
- Population (2021): 317
- Time zone: UTC+3 (TRT)

Hancıçiftliği is a village in the Erzincan District, Erzincan Province, Turkey. The village is populated by Kurds of the Zilan tribe and by Turks. It had a population of 317 in 2021.
