= Yukarıyayla, Narman =

Village in Turkey

Yukarıyayla
- Neighbourhood
- Location in Turkey
- Coordinates: 40°17′01″N 41°47′55″E
- Country: Turkey
- Province: Erzurum
- District: Narman
- Population (2022): 146
- Time zone: UTC+3 (TRT)

Yukarıyayla is a neighbourhood in the municipality and district of Narman, Erzurum Province in Turkey. Its population is 146 (2022).
