= Yoldere, Narman =

Village in Turkey

Yoldere
- Neighbourhood
- Location in Turkey
- Coordinates: 40.2931°N 41.8637°E
- Country: Turkey
- Province: Erzurum
- District: Narman
- Population (2022): 98
- Time zone: UTC+3 (TRT)

Yoldere is a Neighbourhood in the municipality and district of Narman, Erzurum Province in Turkey. Its population is 98 (2022).
