= Konakbaşı, Erzincan =

Village in Erzincan Province, Turkey

Konakbaşı
- Village
- Location within Turkey
- Coordinates: 39.631°N 39.598°E
- Country: Turkey
- Province: Erzincan
- District: Erzincan
- Population (2021): 187
- Time zone: UTC+3 (TRT)

Konakbaşı (Kurdish: Ekrek Huma) is a village in the Erzincan District, Erzincan Province, Turkey. The village is populated by Kurds of the Aşuran, Çarekan and Keçelan tribes and had a population of 187 in 2021.
