= Boğakale, Narman =

Village in Turkey

Boğakale
- Neighbourhood
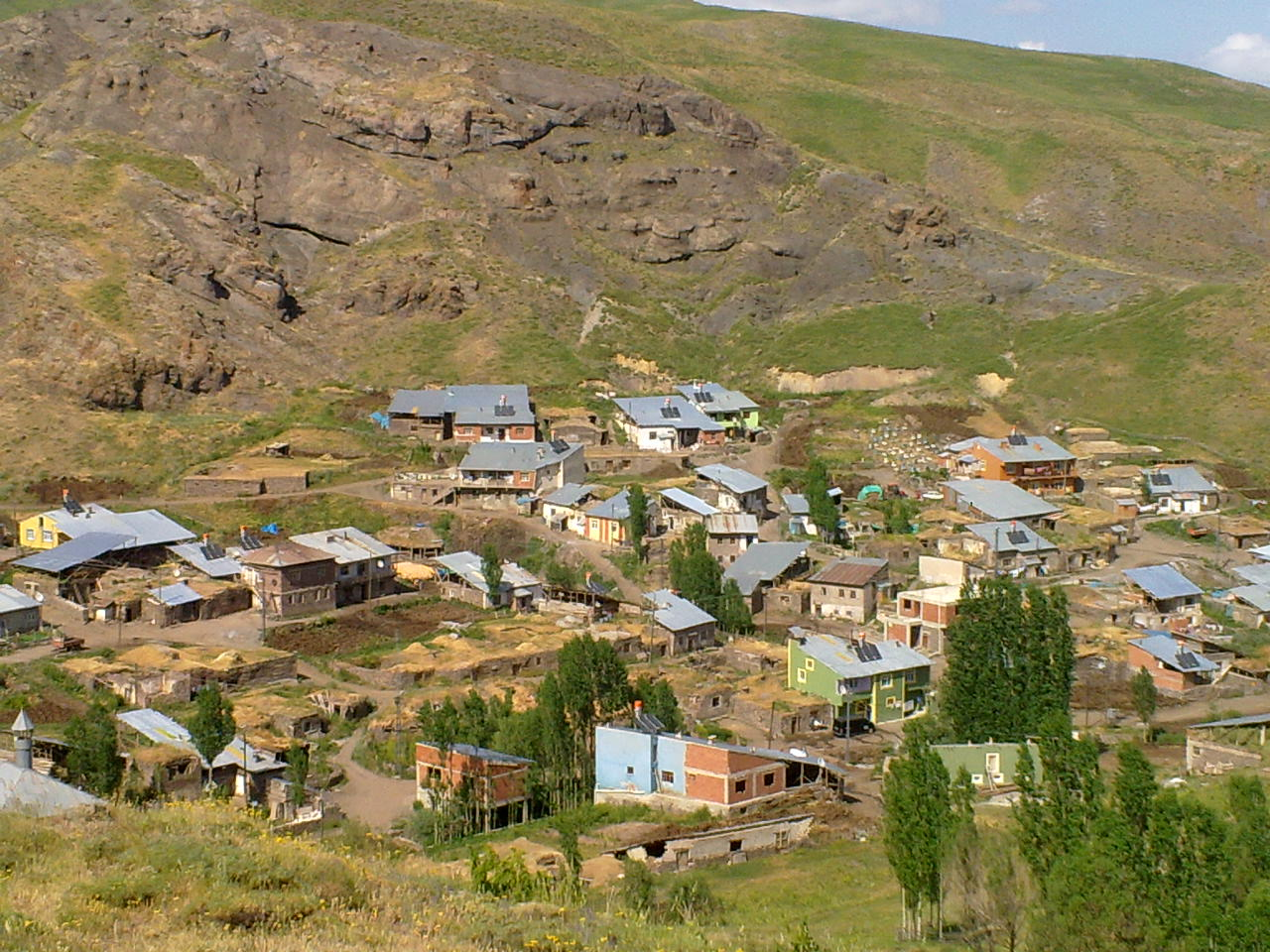

- Location within Turkey
- Coordinates: 40.1946°N 41.7020°E
- Country: Turkey
- Province: Erzurum
- District: Narman
- Population (2022): 163
- Time zone: UTC+3 (TRT)

Boğakale is a neighbourhood in the municipality and district of Narman, Erzurum Province in Turkey. Its population is 163 (2022).
