= Ortayurt, Erzincan =

Village in Erzincan Province, Turkey

Ortayurt
- Village
- Location within Turkey
- Coordinates: 39.615°N 39.586°E
- Country: Turkey
- Province: Erzincan
- District: Erzincan
- Population (2021): 120
- Time zone: UTC+3 (TRT)

Ortayurt is a village in the Erzincan District, Erzincan Province, Turkey. The village had a population of 120 in 2021.
