= Değirmenköy, Erzincan =

Village in Erzincan Province, Turkey

Değirmenköy
- Village
- Location in Turkey
- Coordinates: 39.630°N 39.617°E
- Country: Turkey
- Province: Erzincan
- District: Erzincan
- Population (2021): 331
- Time zone: UTC+3 (TRT)

Değirmenköy is a village in the Erzincan District, Erzincan Province, Turkey. The village is populated by Kurds of the Sisan tribe and had a population of 331 in 2021.

== History ==
On 30 December 1998, it became the center of the town formed under the name of Dörtler by the merger of Konakbaşı, Ortayurt and Ürek villages in the center of Değirmenköy. The name of the village, whose municipality status ended in 2008 with the law numbered 6360, remained as "Dörtler" until 2013. The village is listed as "Değirmenköy" in 2014 and later TÜİK data.
