= Ahmetli, Erzincan =

Village in Erzincan Province, Turkey

Ahmetli
- Village
- Location within Turkey
- Coordinates: 39.874°N 39.331°E
- Country: Turkey
- Province: Erzincan
- District: Erzincan
- Population (2021): 86
- Time zone: UTC+3 (TRT)

Ahmetli (Kurdish: Ahmediye) is a village in the Erzincan District, Erzincan Province, Turkey. The village is populated by Kurds and had a population of 86 in 2021.
