= Yeniköy, Erzincan =

Village in Turkey

Yeniköy
- Village
- Location in Turkey
- Coordinates: 39°43′39″N 39°25′31″E
- Country: Turkey
- Province: Erzincan
- District: Erzincan
- Population (2022): 164
- Time zone: UTC+3 (TRT)

Yeniköy is a village in the Erzincan District of Erzincan Province in Turkey. Its population is 164 (2022).
