= Uluköy, Erzincan =

Village in Erzincan Province, Turkey

Uluköy
- Village
- Location within Turkey
- Coordinates: 39.623°N 39.732°E
- Country: Turkey
- Province: Erzincan
- District: Erzincan
- Population (2021): 520
- Time zone: UTC+3 (TRT)

Uluköy is a village in the Erzincan District, Erzincan Province, Turkey. The village is populated by Kurds of the Rutan tribe and had a population of 520 in 2021. Before the 2013 reorganisation, it was a town (belde).
