= Gümüştarla, Erzincan =

Village in Erzincan Province, Turkey

Gümüştarla
- Village
- Location within Turkey
- Coordinates: 39.756°N 39.425°E
- Country: Turkey
- Province: Erzincan
- District: Erzincan
- Population (2022): 1,996
- Time zone: UTC+3 (TRT)

Gümüştarla (Kurdish: Mitini) is a village in the Erzincan District, Erzincan Province, Turkey. The village is populated by Kurds of the Şadiyan tribe and by Turks. It had a population of 1,996 in 2022.
