= Bahçeliköy, Erzincan =

Village in Erzincan Province, Turkey

Bahçeliköy
- Village
- Location within Turkey
- Coordinates: 39.755°N 39.352°E
- Country: Turkey
- Province: Erzincan
- District: Erzincan
- Population (2021): 408
- Time zone: UTC+3 (TRT)

Bahçeliköy is a village in the Erzincan District, Erzincan Province, Turkey. The village had a population of 408 in 2021. Before the 2013 reorganisation, it was a town (belde).
