= Ekmekli, Erzincan =

Village in Erzincan Province, Turkey

Ekmekli
- Village
- Location within Turkey
- Coordinates: 39.749°N 39.348°E
- Country: Turkey
- Province: Erzincan
- District: Erzincan
- Population (2021): 73
- Time zone: UTC+3 (TRT)

Ekmekli is a village in the Erzincan District, Erzincan Province, Turkey. The village had a population of 73 in 2021.
