= Beyler, Narman =

Village in Turkey

Beyler
- Neighbourhood
- Location in Turkey
- Coordinates: 40.3519°N 41.8003°E
- Country: Turkey
- Province: Erzurum
- District: Narman
- Population (2022): 204
- Time zone: UTC+3 (TRT)

Beyler is a neighbourhood in the municipality and district of Narman, Erzurum Province in Turkey. Its population is 204 (2022).
