= Gürlevik, Erzincan =

Village in Erzincan Province, Turkey

Gürlevik
- Village
- Location within Turkey
- Coordinates: 39.583°N 39.734°E
- Country: Turkey
- Province: Erzincan
- District: Erzincan
- Population (2021): 16
- Time zone: UTC+3 (TRT)

Gürlevik is a village in the Erzincan District, Erzincan Province, Turkey. The village is populated by Kurds of the Abasan tribe and had a population of 16 in 2021. The hamlets of Akpınar, Çevreli and Yaylacık are attached to the village.
