= Mecidiye, Erzincan =

Village in Turkey

Mecidiye
- Village
- Location in Turkey
- Coordinates: 39.850°N 39.510°E
- Country: Turkey
- Province: Erzincan
- District: Erzincan
- Population (2022): 98
- Time zone: UTC+3 (TRT)

Mecidiye is a village in the Erzincan District of Erzincan Province in Turkey. Its population is 98 (2022).
