= Samikale, Narman =

Village in Turkey

Samikale
- Neighbourhood
- Location in Turkey
- Coordinates: 40°23′N 41°53′E
- Country: Turkey
- Province: Erzurum
- District: Narman
- Population (2022): 76
- Time zone: UTC+3 (TRT)

Samikale is a neighbourhood in the municipality and district of Narman, Erzurum Province in Turkey. Its population is 76 (2022).
