= Yalınca, Erzincan =

Village in Erzincan Province, Turkey

Yalınca
- Village
- Location within Turkey
- Coordinates: 39.622°N 39.643°E
- Country: Turkey
- Province: Erzincan
- District: Erzincan
- Population (2021): 399
- Time zone: UTC+3 (TRT)

Yalınca is a village in the Erzincan District, Erzincan Province, Turkey. The village is populated by Kurds of the Lolan and Rutan tribes and had a population of 399 in 2021.
