= Güllüdağ, Narman =

Village in Turkey

Güllüdağ
- Neighbourhood
- Location in Turkey
- Coordinates: 40°23′N 42°09′E
- Country: Turkey
- Province: Erzurum
- District: Narman
- Population (2022): 29
- Time zone: UTC+3 (TRT)

Güllüdağ is a neighbourhood in the municipality and district of Narman, Erzurum Province in Turkey. Its population is 29 (2022).
