= Gökdağ, Narman =

Village in Turkey

Gökdağ
- Neighbourhood
- Location in Turkey
- Coordinates: 40°21′14″N 41°49′37″E
- Country: Turkey
- Province: Erzurum
- District: Narman
- Population (2022): 117
- Time zone: UTC+3 (TRT)

Gökdağ is a neighbourhood in the municipality and district of Narman, Erzurum Province in Turkey. Its population is 117 (2022).
