= Günebakan, Erzincan =

Village in Turkey

Günebakan
- Village
- Location in Turkey
- Coordinates: 39.734°N 39.634°E
- Country: Turkey
- Province: Erzincan
- District: Erzincan
- Population (2022): 444
- Time zone: UTC+3 (TRT)

Günebakan is a village in the Erzincan District of Erzincan Province in Turkey. Its population is 444 (2022).
