= Ergan, Erzincan =

Village in Erzincan Province, Turkey

Ergan
- Village
- Location within Turkey
- Coordinates: 39.614°N 39.554°E
- Country: Turkey
- Province: Erzincan
- District: Erzincan
- Population (2021): 211
- Time zone: UTC+3 (TRT)

Ergan (formerly Oğulcuk) is a village in the Erzincan District, Erzincan Province, Turkey. The village is populated by Kurds of the Aşuran, Demenan and Keçelan tribes and had a population of 211 in 2021. The hamlet of Gelinsi is attached to the village.
