= Soğukoluk, Erzincan =

Village in Erzincan Province, Turkey

Soğukoluk
- Village
- Location within Turkey
- Coordinates: 39.642°N 39.606°E
- Country: Turkey
- Province: Erzincan
- District: Erzincan
- Population (2021): 305
- Time zone: UTC+3 (TRT)

Soğukoluk is a village in the Erzincan District, Erzincan Province, Turkey. The village had a population of 305 in 2021. The hamlet of Aktepe is attached to the village.
