= Söğütözü, Erzincan =

Village in Turkey

Söğütözü
- Village
- Location in Turkey
- Coordinates: 39.702°N 39.386°E
- Country: Turkey
- Province: Erzincan
- District: Erzincan
- Population (2022): 151
- Time zone: UTC+3 (TRT)

Söğütözü is a village in the Erzincan District of Erzincan Province in Turkey. Its population is 151 (2022). Its elevation is 890 metres.
