= Göyne, Erzincan =

Village in Turkey

Göyne
- Village
- Location in Turkey
- Coordinates: 39°49′N 39°14′E
- Country: Turkey
- Province: Erzincan
- District: Erzincan
- Population (2022): 41
- Time zone: UTC+3 (TRT)

Göyne is a village in the Erzincan District of Erzincan Province in Turkey. Its population is 41 (2022).
