= Alacayar, Narman =

Village in Turkey

Alacayar
- Neighbourhood
- Location in Turkey
- Coordinates: 40.2809°N 41.8958°E
- Country: Turkey
- Province: Erzurum
- District: Narman
- Population (2022): 122
- Time zone: UTC+3 (TRT)

Alacayar is a neighbourhood in the municipality and district of Narman, Erzurum Province in Turkey. Its population is 122 (2022).
