= Alabalık, Narman =

Village in Turkey

Alabalık
- Neighbourhood
- Location in Turkey
- Coordinates: 40.4295°N 41.9361°E
- Country: Turkey
- Province: Erzurum
- District: Narman
- Population (2022): 185
- Time zone: UTC+3 (TRT)

Alabalık is a neighbourhood in the municipality and district of Narman, Erzurum Province in Turkey. Its population is 185 (2022).

== Alabalık Castle ==
The castle is located 18 km from the town center. The exact purpose of the castle is unknown, and the remains are on the verge of collapse due to illegal excavations and floods. Khorasan mortar was used in the construction of the tower.
