= Ganiefendi Çiftliği, Erzincan =

Village in Erzincan Province, Turkey

Ganiefendi Çiftliği
- Village
- Location within Turkey
- Coordinates: 39.674°N 39.613°E
- Country: Turkey
- Province: Erzincan
- District: Erzincan
- Population (2021): 270
- Time zone: UTC+3 (TRT)

Ganiefendi Çiftliği (Kurdish: Ganîefendî) is a village in the Erzincan District, Erzincan Province, Turkey. The village is populated by Kurds of the Kurmeş tribe and had a population of 270 in 2021.
