= Çatalören, Erzincan =

Village in Turkey

Çatalören
- Village
- Location in Turkey
- Coordinates: 39°40′1″N 39°30′46″E
- Country: Turkey
- Province: Erzincan
- District: Erzincan
- Population (2022): 314
- Time zone: UTC+3 (TRT)

Çatalören is a village in the Erzincan District of Erzincan Province in Turkey. It is populated by Kurds of the Demen tribe and had a population of 314 in 2022.
