= Kalecik, Erzincan =

Village in Erzincan Province, Turkey

Kalecik
- Village
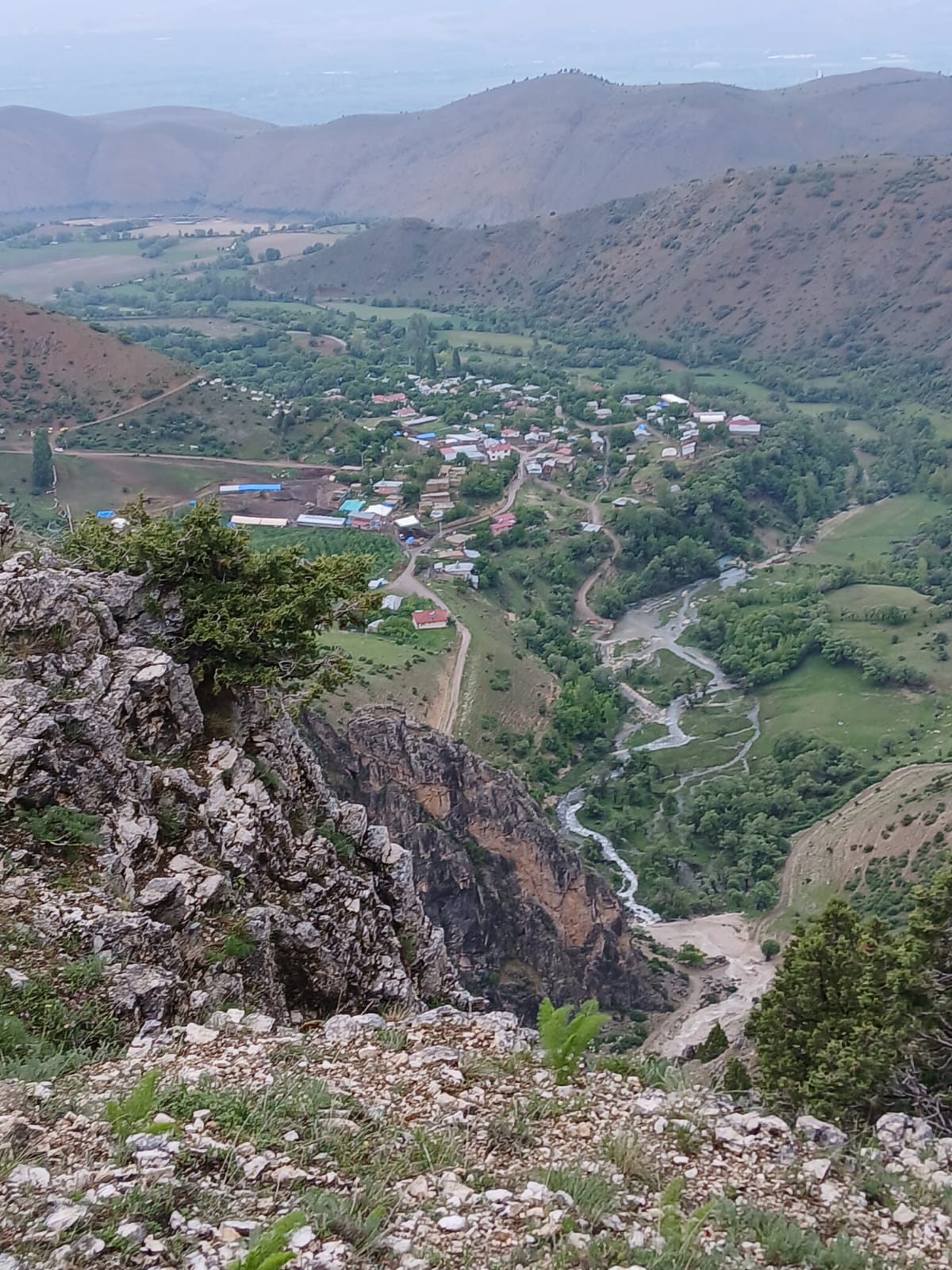

- Location within Turkey
- Coordinates: 39.572°N 39.735°E
- Country: Turkey
- Province: Erzincan
- District: Erzincan
- Population (2021): 95
- Time zone: UTC+3 (TRT)

Kalecik is a village in the Erzincan District, Erzincan Province, Turkey. The village is populated by Kurds of the Abasan and Balan tribes and had a population of 95 in 2021.
