= Ekinci, Erzincan =

Village in Turkey

Ekinci
- Village
- Location in Turkey
- Coordinates: 39°47′19″N 39°17′45″E
- Country: Turkey
- Province: Erzincan
- District: Erzincan
- Population (2022): 53
- Time zone: UTC+3 (TRT)

Ekinci is a village in the Erzincan District of Erzincan Province in Turkey. Its population is 53 (2022).
