= Karatuş, Erzincan =

Village in Erzincan Province, Turkey

Karatuş
- Village
- Location within Turkey
- Coordinates: 39.594°N 39.678°E
- Country: Turkey
- Province: Erzincan
- District: Erzincan
- Population (2021): 46
- Time zone: UTC+3 (TRT)

Karatuş is a village in the Erzincan District, Erzincan Province, Turkey. The village is populated by Kurds of the Abasan, Kurêşan and Lolan tribes and had a population of 46 in 2021.
