= Sülüklü, Narman =

Village in Turkey

Sülüklü
- Neighbourhood
- Country: Turkey
- Province: Erzurum
- District: Narman
- Population (2022): 92
- Time zone: UTC+3 (TRT)

Sülüklü is a neighbourhood in the municipality and district of Narman, Erzurum Province in Turkey. Its population is 92 (2022).
