= Narman =

- District and municipality
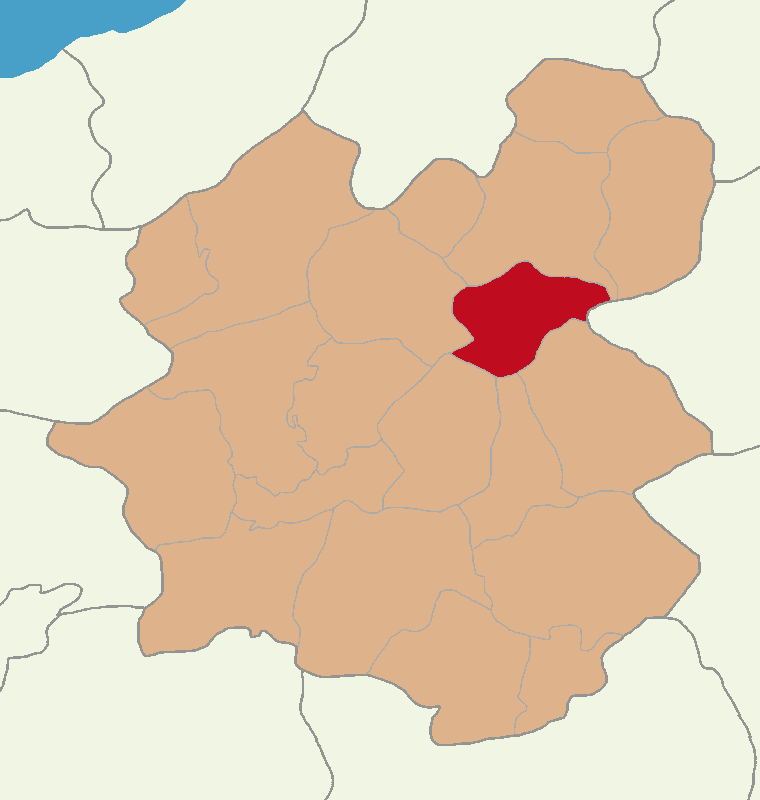
- Map showing Narman District in Erzurum Province

- Location within Turkey
- Coordinates: 40°20′50″N 41°52′06″E
- Country: Turkey
- Province: Erzurum

Government
  - Mayor: Aydemir Adem Kinalı (AKP)
- Area: 799 km^{2} (308 sq mi)
- Elevation: 1,640 m (5,380 ft)
- Population (2022): 12,292
  - Density: 15.4/km^{2} (39.8/sq mi)
- Time zone: UTC+3 (TRT)
- Postal code: 25530
- Area code: 0442
- Climate: Dfb
- Website: www.narman.bel.tr

Narman (Armenian: Նամուրվան; Georgian: ნარიმანი), formerly Namervan and İd, is a municipality and district of Erzurum Province, Turkey. Its area is 799 km^{2}, and its population is 12,292 (2022). The mayor is Aydemir Adem Kinalı (AKP).

Narman has been under control of Arabs, Byzantines, Seljuks, Ottomans, and the Russians. Following the 1917 Bolshevik Revolution, Narman was briefly under Armenian control. In 1918, it became a part of the Ottoman empire.

== Narman Fairy Chimneys ==
One of Narman's most famous tourist attractions are the red "fairy chimneys." These formations are composed of red sandstone and gravel enriched with iron minerals that date back to the Pliocene Epoch. They are distinct from their counterparts in Cappadocia because they are a sedimentary, not volcanic, phenomenon. The fairy chimneys take on a red color due to the oxidation of the iron in the rock. The site covers an area of 6,300 hectares.

== Composition ==
There are 46 neighborhoods in Narman District:

- Alabalık
- Alacayar
- Araköy
- Aşağıyayla
- Başkale
- Beyler
- Boğakale
- Camikebir
- Camisağır
- Çamlıyayla
- Çimenli
- Dağyolu
- Demirdağ
- Ergazi
- Gökdağ
- Göllü
- Güllüdağ
- Güvenlik
- Kamışözü
- Karadağ
- Karapınar
- Kilimli
- Kışlaköy
- Koçkaya
- Koyunören
- Kuruçalı
- Mahmutçavuş
- Mercimekli
- Otlutepe
- Pınaryolu
- Samikale
- Sapanlı
- Savaşçılar
- Şehitler
- Şekerli
- Serinsu
- Seyyid Ali Baba
- Sülüklü
- Sütpınar
- Taşburun
- Telli
- Toygarlı
- Tuzla
- Yanıktaş
- Yoldere
- Yukarıyayla

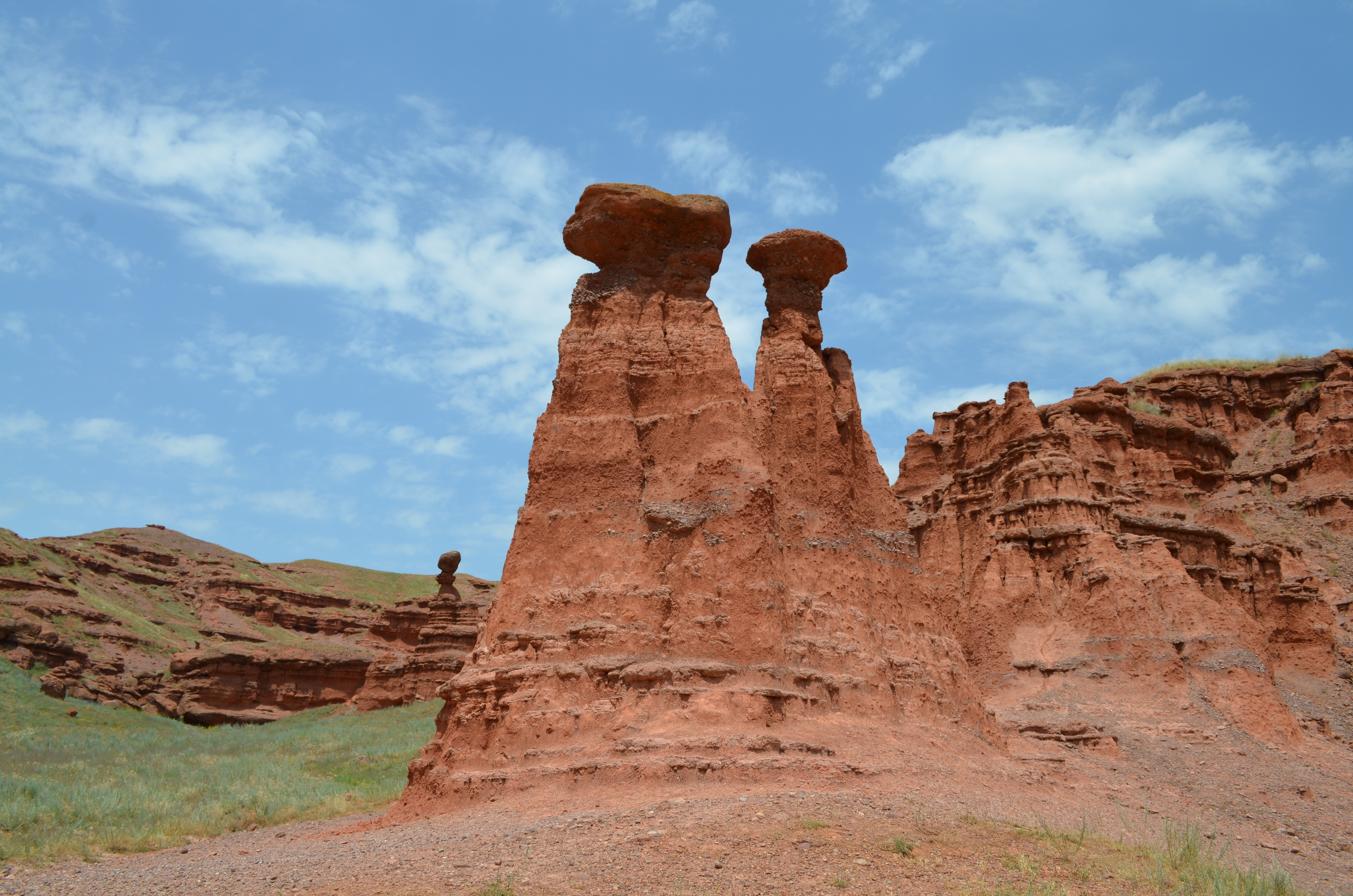
A view of the red fairy chimneys.
