= Kamışözü, Narman =

Village in Turkey

Kamışözü
- Neighbourhood
- Location in Turkey
- Coordinates: 40°19′35″N 41°48′35″E
- Country: Turkey
- Province: Erzurum
- District: Narman
- Population (2022): 165
- Time zone: UTC+3 (TRT)

Kamışözü is a neighbourhood in the municipality and district of Narman, Erzurum Province in Turkey. Its population is 165 (2022).
