= Aydoğdu, Erzincan =

Village in Erzincan District, Turkey

Aydoğdu
- Village
- Location in Turkey
- Coordinates: 39.742°N 39.381°E
- Country: Turkey
- Province: Erzincan
- District: Erzincan
- Population (2021): 350
- Time zone: UTC+3 (TRT)

Aydoğdu is a village in the Erzincan District of Erzincan Province in Turkey. It had a population of 350 in 2021.
