= Türkmenoğlu, Erzincan =

Village in Erzincan Province, Turkey

Türkmenoğlu
- Village
- Location within Turkey
- Coordinates: 39.654°N 39.499°E
- Country: Turkey
- Province: Erzincan
- District: Erzincan
- Population (2021): 367
- Time zone: UTC+3 (TRT)

Türkmenoğlu (Kurdish: Dacirek) is a village in the Erzincan District, Erzincan Province, Turkey. The village is populated by Kurds of the Abasan tribe and had a population of 367 in 2021. The hamlet of Tepecik is attached to the village.
