= Karapınar, Narman =

Village in Turkey

Karapınar
- Neighbourhood
- Country: Turkey
- Province: Erzurum
- District: Narman
- Population (2022): 55
- Time zone: UTC+3 (TRT)

Karapınar is a neighbourhood in the municipality and district of Narman, Erzurum Province in Turkey. Its population is 55 (2022).
