= Binkoç, Erzincan =

Village in Erzincan Province, Turkey

Binkoç
- Village
- Location in Turkey
- Coordinates: 39.659°N 39.491°E
- Country: Turkey
- Province: Erzincan
- District: Erzincan
- Population (2021): 221
- Time zone: UTC+3 (TRT)

Binkoç is a village in the Erzincan District of Erzincan Province in Turkey. It had a population of 222 in 2021.

The hamlet of Memetalibey is attached to the village.
