= Yeşilçat, Erzincan =

Village in Erzincan Province, Turkey

Yeşilçat
- Village
- Location within Turkey
- Coordinates: 39.799°N 39.334°E
- Country: Turkey
- Province: Erzincan
- District: Erzincan
- Population (2021): 111
- Time zone: UTC+3 (TRT)

Yeşilçat is a village in the Erzincan District, Erzincan Province, Turkey. The village is had a population of 111 in 2021.
