= Sapanlı, Narman =

Village in Turkey

Sapanlı
- Neighbourhood
- Country: Turkey
- Province: Erzurum
- District: Narman
- Population (2022): 36
- Time zone: UTC+3 (TRT)

Sapanlı is a neighbourhood in the municipality and district of Narman, Erzurum Province in Turkey. Its population is 36 (2022).
