= Koçyatağı, Erzincan =

Village in Erzincan Province, Turkey

Koçyatağı
- Village
- Location within Turkey
- Coordinates: 39°54′36″N 39°12′10″E
- Country: Turkey
- Province: Erzincan
- District: Erzincan
- Population (2021): 119
- Time zone: UTC+3 (TRT)

Koçyatağı (Kurdish: Mihar) is a village in the Erzincan District, Erzincan Province, Turkey. The village is populated by Kurds of the Kurmeş tribe and had a population of 119 in 2021.
