= Erzincan District =

District of Erzincan Province, Turkey

- District
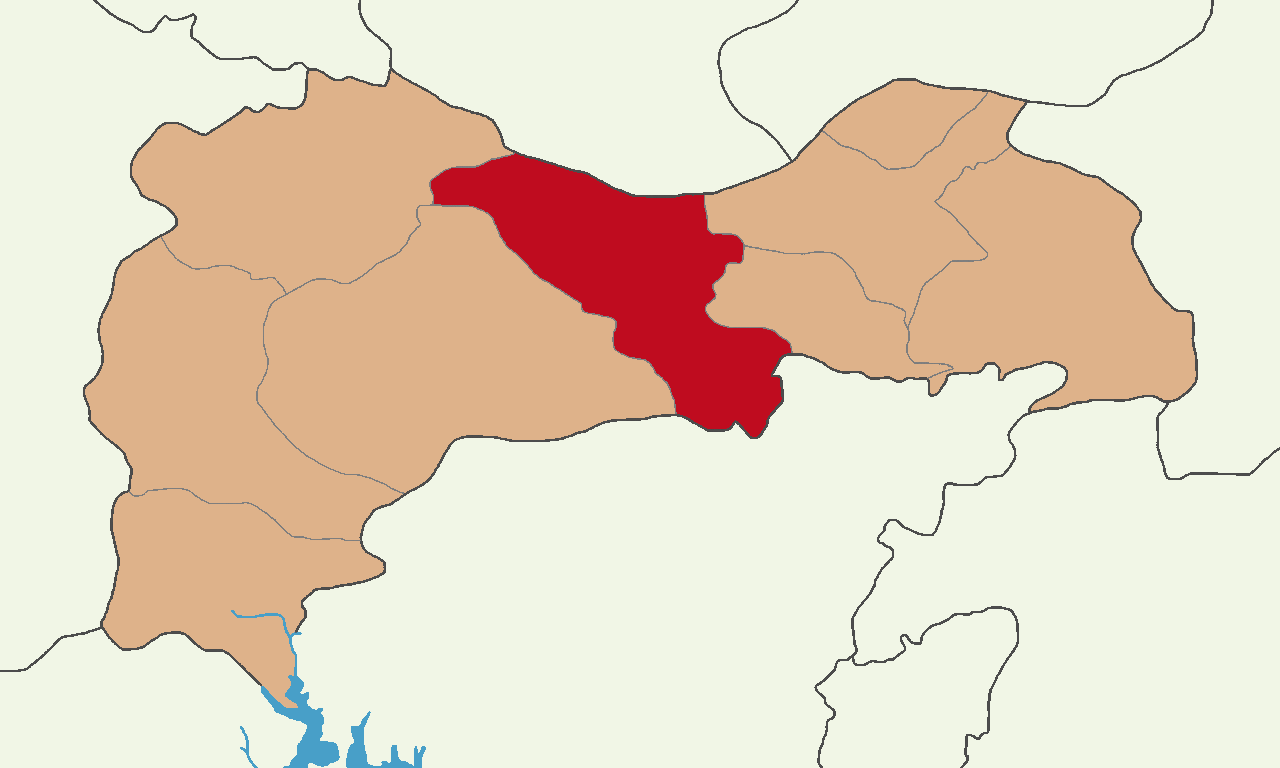
- Map showing Erzincan District in Erzincan Province

- Location in Turkey
- Coordinates: 39°45′N 39°29′E
- Country: Turkey
- Province: Erzincan
- Seat: Erzincan
- Area: 1,521 km^{2} (587 sq mi)
- Population (2022): 166,181
  - Density: 109.3/km^{2} (283.0/sq mi)
- Time zone: UTC+3 (TRT)

Erzincan District (also: Merkez, meaning "central" in Turkish) is a district of the Erzincan Province of Turkey. Its seat is the city of Erzincan. Its area is 1,521 km^{2}, and its population is 166,181 (2022).

== Composition ==
There are three municipalities in Erzincan District:

- Çağlayan
- Erzincan
- Mollaköy

There are 59 villages in Erzincan District:

- Ağılözü
- Ahmetli
- Aydoğdu
- Bahçeliköy
- Bahçeyazı
- Baltaşı
- Balibey
- Ballı
- Beşsaray
- Binkoç
- Caferli
- Cevizli
- Çatalarmut
- Çatalören
- Çubuklu
- Değirmenköy
- Ekinci
- Ekmekli
- Elmaköy
- Ergan
- Ganiefendi Çiftliği
- Gölpınar
- Göyne
- Gümüştarla
- Günbağı
- Günebakan
- Gürlevik
- Hacıali Palangası
- Hancıçiftliği
- Hanidere
- Heybeli
- Ilıdere
- Kalecik
- Karadiğin
- Karatuş
- Kılıçkaya
- Kilimli
- Koçyatağı
- Konakbaşı
- Küçük Çakırman
- Mecidiye
- Oğlaktepe
- Ortayurt
- Pekmezli
- Pınarönü
- Sazlıpınar
- Saztepe
- Soğukoluk
- Söğütözü
- Sütpınar
- Tandırlı
- Tatlısu
- Türkmenoğlu
- Uluköy
- Ürek
- Yalınca
- Yeniköy
- Yeşilçat
- Yeşilçay
