= Beşsaray, Erzincan =

Village in Erzincan Province, Turkey

Beşsaray
- Village
- Location within Turkey
- Coordinates: 39.712°N 39.430°E
- Country: Turkey
- Province: Erzincan
- District: Erzincan
- Population (2021): 404
- Time zone: UTC+3 (TRT)

Beşsaray (also known as Surbahan) is a village in the Erzincan District, Erzincan Province, Turkey. The village is populated by Kurds of the Keçelan tribe and had a population of 404 in 2021.
