= Balibey, Erzincan =

Village in Erzincan Province, Turkey

Balibey
- Village
- Location in Turkey
- Coordinates: 39.695°N 39.568°E
- Country: Turkey
- Province: Erzincan
- District: Erzincan
- Population (2021): 182
- Time zone: UTC+3 (TRT)

Balibey or Balıbeyi is a village in the Erzincan District of Erzincan Province in Turkey. The village had a population of 182 in 2021.

The hamlet of Sütçüler is attached to the village.
