= Günbağı, Erzincan =

Village in Erzincan Province, Turkey

Günbağı
- Village
- Location within Turkey
- Coordinates: 39.588°N 39.624°E
- Country: Turkey
- Province: Erzincan
- District: Erzincan
- Population (2021): 325
- Time zone: UTC+3 (TRT)

Günbağı is a village in the Erzincan District, Erzincan Province, Turkey. The village is populated by Kurds of the Aşuran and Lolan tribes and had a population of 325 in 2021. The hamlet of Uğurlu is attached to the village.
