= Caferli, Erzincan =

Village in Erzincan Province, Turkey

Caferli
- Village
- Location within Turkey
- Coordinates: 39.627°N 39.444°E
- Country: Turkey
- Province: Erzincan
- District: Erzincan
- Population (2021): 63
- Time zone: UTC+3 (TRT)

Caferli is a village in the Erzincan District, Erzincan Province, Turkey. The village is populated by Kurds and had a population of 63 in 2021. The hamlet of Cafolar is attached to the village.
