= Qaradeyin, Agdash =

Qaradeyin
- Municipality
- Location within Azerbaijan
- Coordinates: 40°31′21″N 47°17′06″E
- Country: Azerbaijan
- Rayon: Agdash

Population
  - Total: 1,551
- Time zone: UTC+4 (AZT)
  - Summer (DST): UTC+5 (AZT)

Qaradeyin (also, Karadein) is a village and municipality in the Agdash Rayon of Azerbaijan. It has a population of 1,551.
