= Heybeli, Erzincan =

Village in Erzincan Province, Turkey

Heybeli
- Village
- Location within Turkey
- Coordinates: 39.828°N 39.316°E
- Country: Turkey
- Province: Erzincan
- District: Erzincan
- Population (2021): 146
- Time zone: UTC+3 (TRT)

Heybeli (Kurdish: Axgi) is a village in the Erzincan District, Erzincan Province, Turkey. The village is populated by Kurds of the Kurmeş tribe and had a population of 146 in 2021.
