= Kilimli, Erzincan =

Village in Turkey

Kilimli
- Village
- Location in Turkey
- Coordinates: 39.668°N 39.476°E
- Country: Turkey
- Province: Erzincan
- District: Erzincan
- Population (2022): 285
- Time zone: UTC+3 (TRT)

Kilimli is a village in the Erzincan District of Erzincan Province in Turkey. Its population is 285 (2022).
