= Çubuklu, Erzincan =

Village in Turkey

Çubuklu
- Village
- Location in Turkey
- Coordinates: 39°37′19″N 39°26′6″E
- Country: Turkey
- Province: Erzincan
- District: Erzincan
- Population (2022): 63
- Time zone: UTC+3 (TRT)

Çubuklu is a village in the Erzincan District of Erzincan Province in Turkey. Its population is 63 (2022).
