= Baltaşı, Erzincan =

Village in Erzincan Province, Turkey

Baltaşı
- Village
- Location within Turkey
- Coordinates: 39.799°N 39.198°E
- Country: Turkey
- Province: Erzincan
- District: Erzincan
- Population (2021): 44
- Time zone: UTC+3 (TRT)

Baltaşı is a village in the Erzincan District, Erzincan Province, Turkey. The village is populated by Kurds and had a population of 44 in 2021.
