= Tatlısu, Erzincan =

Village in Erzincan Province, Turkey

Tatlısu
- Village
- Location within Turkey
- Coordinates: 39.574°N 39.650°E
- Country: Turkey
- Province: Erzincan
- District: Erzincan
- Population (2021): 178
- Time zone: UTC+3 (TRT)

Tatlısu (Kurdish: Maxacur) is a village in the Erzincan District, Erzincan Province, Turkey. The village is populated by Kurds of the Aşuran tribe and had a population of 178 in 2021. The hamlet of Gülali is attached to the village.
