= Qaradeyin, Qabala =

Qaradeyin
- Municipality
- Location within Azerbaijan Location within Shaki-Zagatala Economic Region
- Coordinates: 40°49′N 47°40′E
- Country: Azerbaijan
- Rayon: Qabala

Population
  - Total: 375
- Time zone: UTC+4 (AZT)
  - Summer (DST): UTC+5 (AZT)

Qaradeyin (also, Qaradeyn, Karadein, and Karadigin) is a village and municipality in the Qabala Rayon of Azerbaijan. It has a population of 375.
