= Göllü, Narman =

Village in Turkey

Göllü
- Neighbourhood
- Country: Turkey
- Province: Erzurum
- District: Narman
- Population (2022): 265
- Time zone: UTC+3 (TRT)

Göllü is a neighbourhood in the municipality and district of Narman, Erzurum Province in Turkey. Its population is 265 (2022).

The historical name of Göllü is Khokhori. Khokhori (ხოხორი), a Georgian place name, means "noise", "uproar". The name of the village was written as Khokhor (خوخور) in the Çıldır Province cebe defter (1694–1732) and in the Ottoman village list of 1928.

The Khokhori Church, which remained from the period when the Christian population lived and is now in ruins, is 600 meters east of the village center.
