= Karadiğin, Erzincan =

Village in Turkey

Karadiğin
- Village
- Location in Turkey
- Coordinates: 39.694°N 39.576°E
- Country: Turkey
- Province: Erzincan
- District: Erzincan
- Population (2022): 377
- Time zone: UTC+3 (TRT)

Karadiğin is a village in the Erzincan District of Erzincan Province in Turkey. Its population is 377 (2022).
