= Seyyid Ali Baba =

Village in Turkey

- Neighbourhood
- Country: Turkey
- Province: Erzurum
- District: Narman
- Population (2022): 54
- Time zone: UTC+3 (TRT)

Seyyid Ali Baba (formerly: Tuztaşı) is a neighbourhood in the municipality and district of Narman, Erzurum Province in Turkey. Its population is 54 (2022).
