= Mollaköy, Erzincan =

Municipality in Erzincan Province, Turkey

Mollaköy
- Municipality
- Location in Turkey
- Coordinates: 39.640°N 39.578°E
- Country: Turkey
- Province: Erzincan
- District: Erzincan
- Population (2021): 1,477
- Time zone: UTC+3 (TRT)

Mollaköy (Kurdish: Gundê Melê) is a municipality (belde) in the Erzincan District, Erzincan Province, Turkey. It is populated by Kurds of the Keman tribe and had a population of 1,477 in 2021. The neighborhoods are Atatürk, Cumhuriyet, Mahmutlu, Tepecik and Yeşilyurt.
