= Çağlayan, Erzincan =

Municipality in Erzincan Province, Turkey

Çağlayan
- Municipality
- Location in Turkey
- Coordinates: 39.591°N 39.697°E
- Country: Turkey
- Province: Erzincan
- District: Erzincan
- Population (2021): 1,699
- Time zone: UTC+3 (TRT)

Çağlayan (Kurdish: Cencige) is a municipality (belde) in the Erzincan District, Erzincan Province, Turkey. It is populated by Kurds of the Abasan and Balan tribes and had a population of 1,699 in 2021. The neighborhoods are Atatürk, Cumhuriyet, Derebağ, Erdene, Mertekli, Şelale and Yamaçlı.
