= Yeşilçay, Erzincan =

Village in Erzincan Province, Turkey

Yeşilçay
- Village
- Location within Turkey
- Coordinates: 39.719°N 39.358°E
- Country: Turkey
- Province: Erzincan
- District: Erzincan
- Population (2021): 131
- Time zone: UTC+3 (TRT)

Yeşilçay is a village in the Erzincan District, Erzincan Province, Turkey. The village had a population of 131 in 2021.
