= Frafjord =

Frafjord may refer to:

- Frafjord (village), in Gjesdal municipality, Rogaland county, Norway
- Frafjorden, or Frafjord, a fjord in Rogaland county, Norway
- Marit Malm Frafjord (born 1985), Norwegian handball player

== See also ==
- Frafjord Tunnel, in Gjesdal municipality, Rogaland county, Norway
