= Flassavatnet =

Lake in Rogaland, Norway

- Interactive map of Flassavatnet
- Location: Jæren, Rogaland
- Coordinates: 58.78915°N 5.86879°E
- Basin countries: Norway
- Max. length: 1.4 kilometres (0.87 mi)
- Max. width: 1.4 kilometres (0.87 mi)
- Surface area: 0.9243 km^{2} (0.3569 sq mi)
- Surface elevation: 177 metres (581 ft)
- Islands: 1 island (Holmen) and several islets
- References: NVE

Flassavatnet is a lake in Rogaland county, Norway. The lake lies on the border of Gjesdal Municipality and Sandnes Municipality. The 0.9243-square-kilometre (0.3569 sq mi) lake sits about 1 kilometre (0.62 mi) north of the large village of Ålgård, not far north of the lakes Edlandsvatnet and Limavatnet. The lake is a reservoir with a small dam on the southern edge of the lake. The water level is kept at about 177 metres (581 ft) above sea level. The reservoir holds about 900,000 cubic metres (730 acre⋅ft; 1,200,000 yd^{3}).

== See also ==
- List of lakes in Norway
