= Månafossen =

Waterfall in Rogaland, Norway

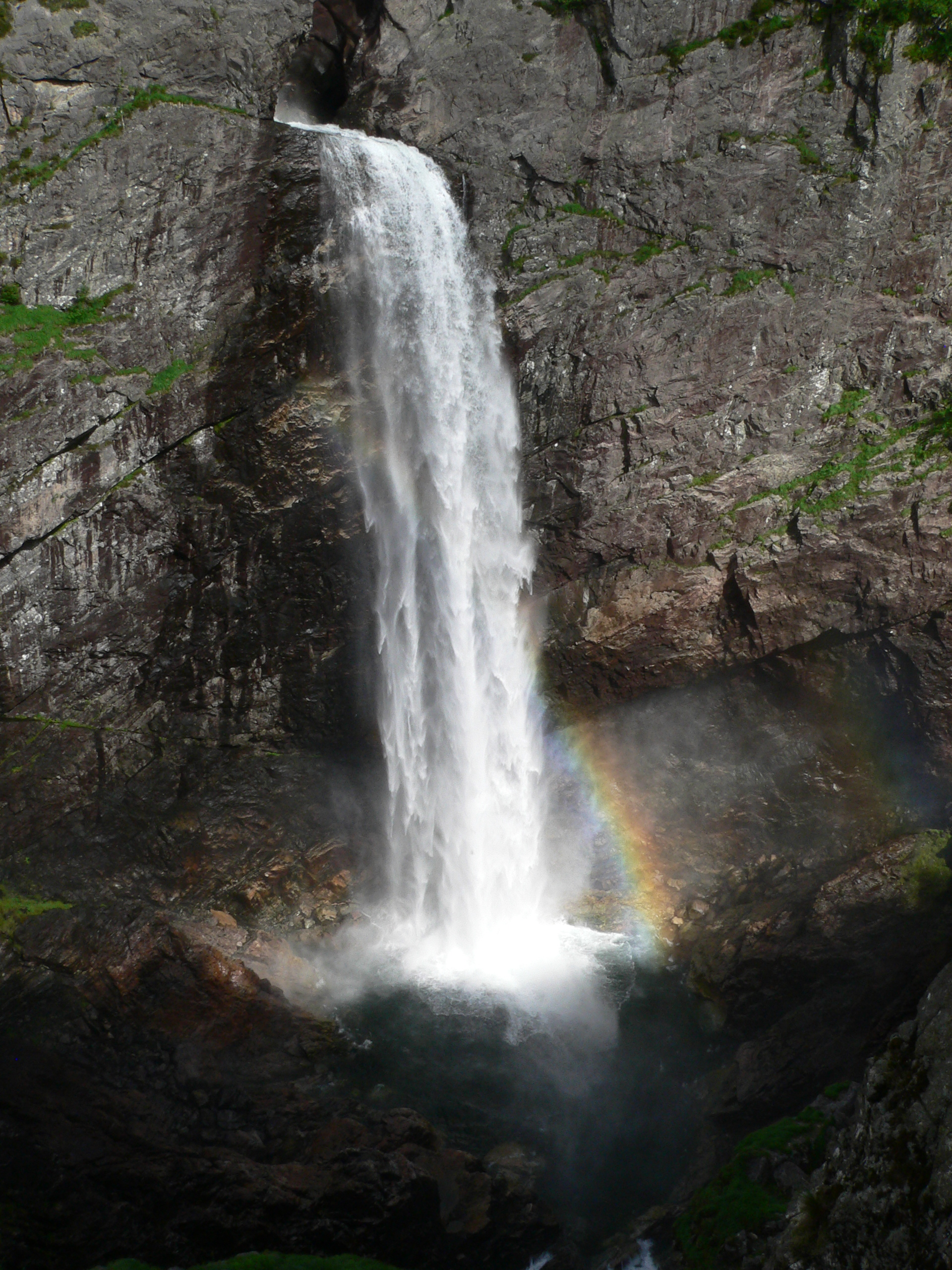
- Interactive map of Månafossen
- Location: Rogaland, Norway
- Coordinates: 58.85776°N 6.38449°E
- Type: Plunge
- Total height: 92 m
- Number of drops: 1
- Longest drop: 92 m
- Watercourse: Månaåna

Månafossen is a waterfall in Gjesdal Municipality in Rogaland county, Norway. The 92 metre tall waterfall is located along the river Månaåna, about 6 kilometres east of the end of the Frafjorden where the village of Frafjord is located. The waterfall is in a fairly isolated area. There is a parking area nearby with a steep, rough 250 metres hiking trail up a mountainside to see the waterfall. The hike takes about 30 minutes.

== Gallery ==
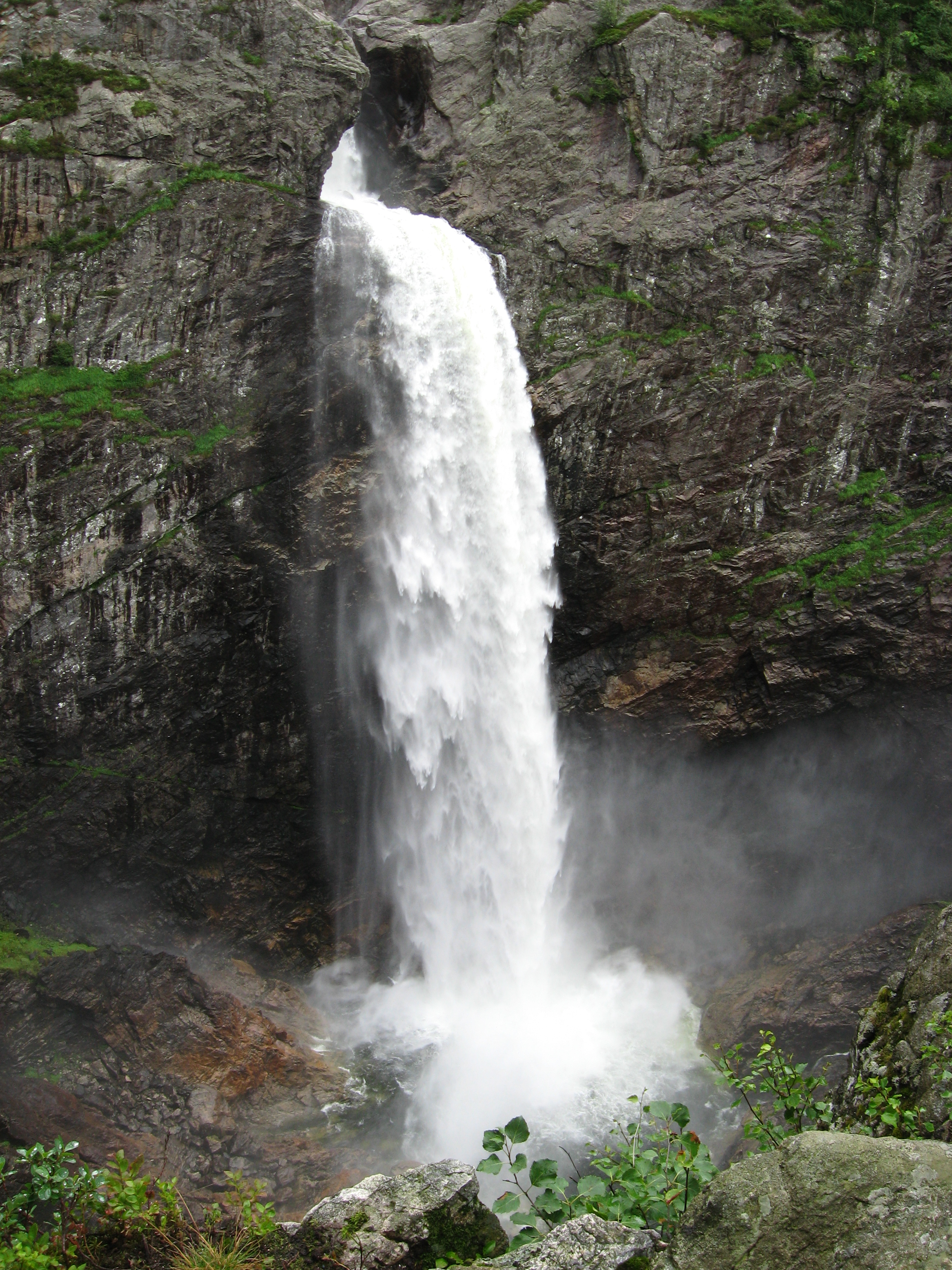
Månafossen

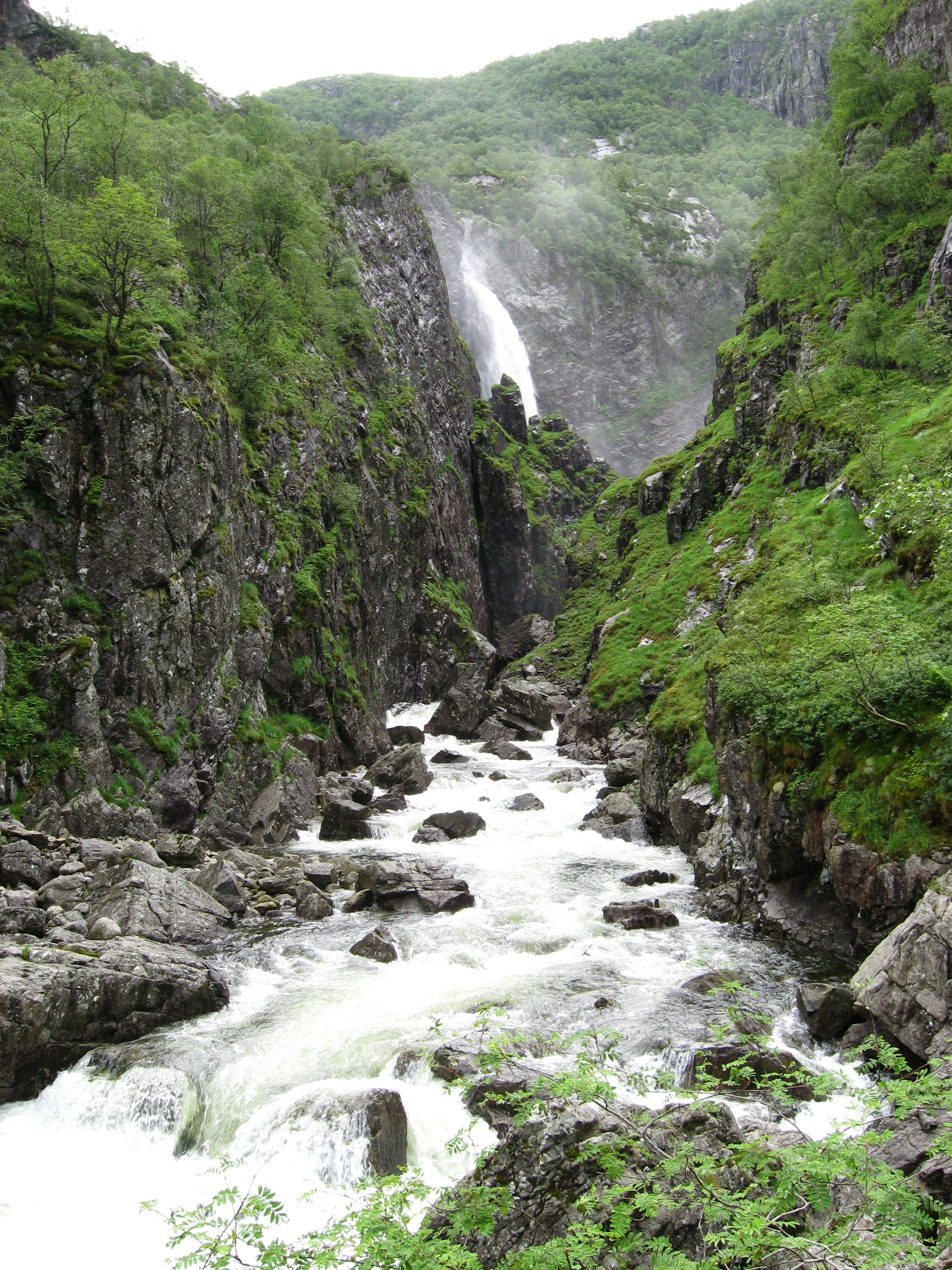
Månafossen seen from the ground

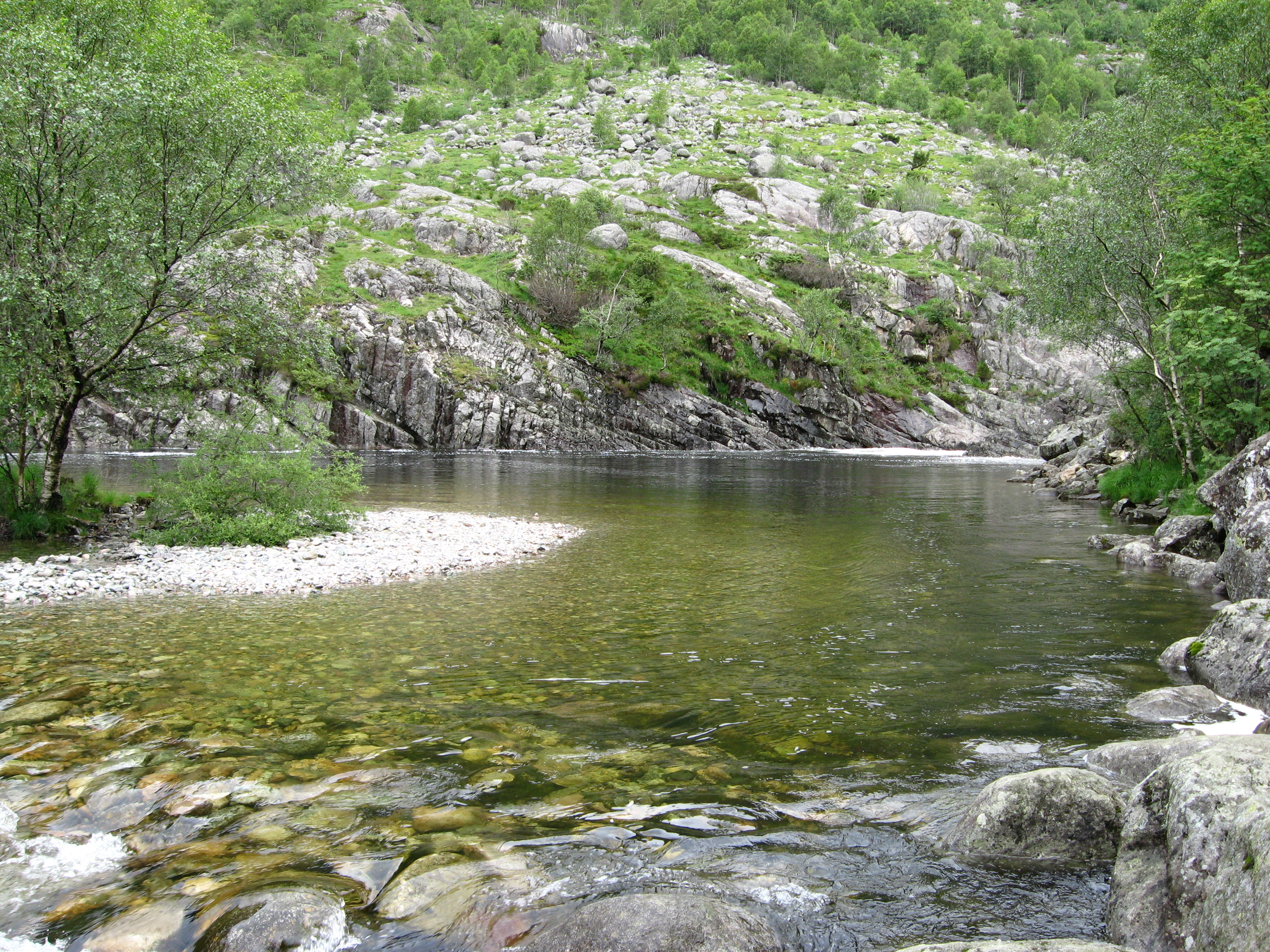
Water from Månafossen

== Film location ==
Månafossen features prominently as a fictional waterfall located in Japan in the 2020 British science fiction film Archive.

== See also ==
- List of waterfalls
