= Dirdal =

Village in Gjesdal Municipality, Norway

- Village
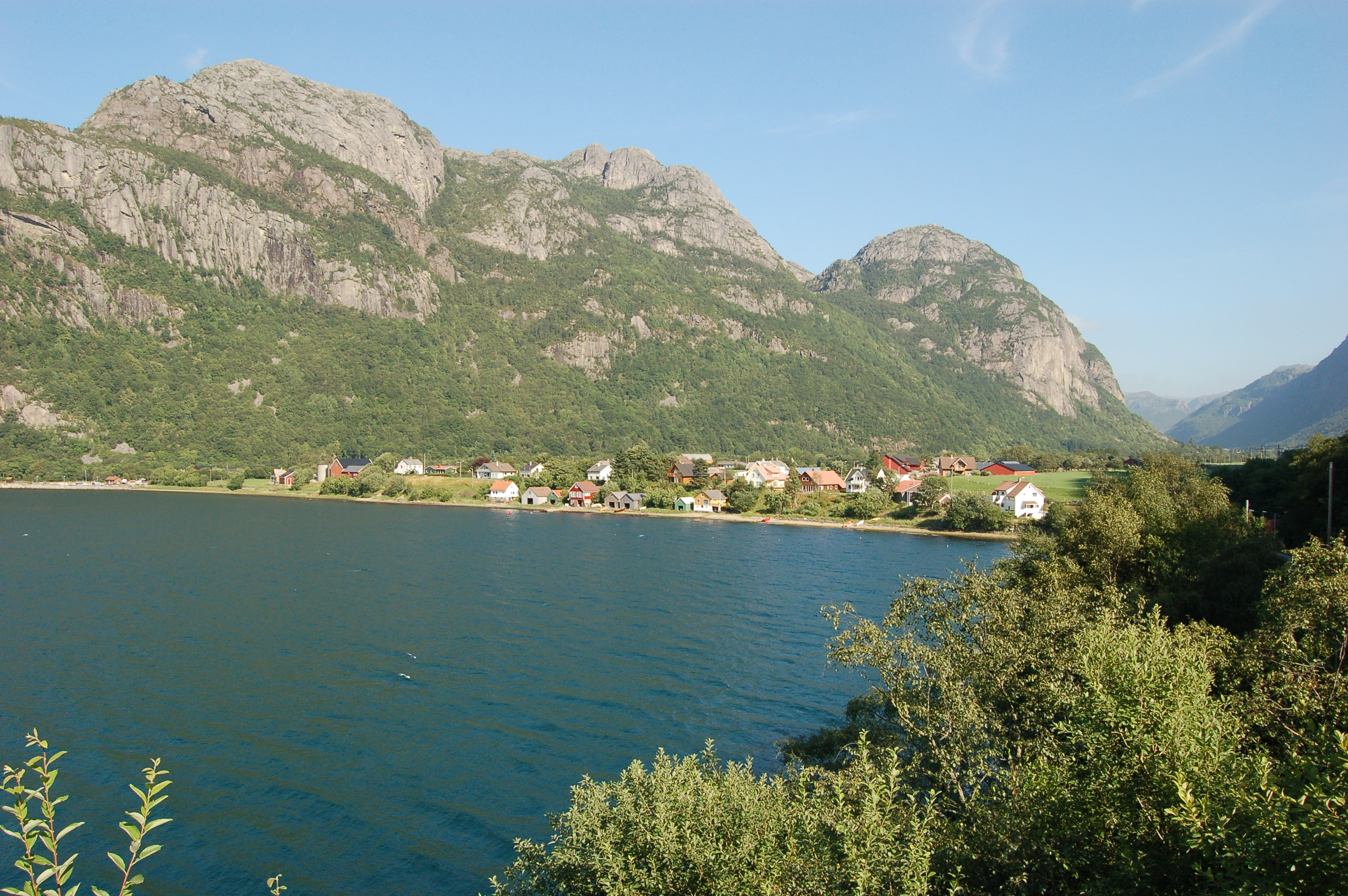
- View of the village and the Høgsfjorden
- Interactive map of Dirdal
- Coordinates: 58.83407°N 6.18112°E
- Country: Norway
- Region: Western Norway
- County: Rogaland
- District: Jæren
- Municipality: Gjesdal Municipality
- Elevation: 9 m (30 ft)
- Time zone: UTC+01:00 (CET)
  - Summer (DST): UTC+02:00 (CEST)
- Post Code: 4335 Dirdal

Dirdal is a village in Gjesdal Municipality in Rogaland county, Norway. The village is located where the Frafjorden joins the main Høgsfjorden. The village lies at the end of the Dirdalen valley, which stretches to the southeast from Dirdal. The village of Gilja lies about 5 kilometres (3.1 mi) into the valley. The village of Oltedal lies about 8 kilometres (5.0 mi) west of Dirdal. Dirdal Church is located in the village.

The Dirdalen valley is about 10-kilometre (6.2 mi) long, following the Dirdalsåna river. The valley is connected to the neighboring valley of Frafjord by the Frafjord Tunnel which runs through the mountains and ends at the village of Gilja.

== History ==
Prior to 1 January 1965, the village (and valley) were part of Forsand Municipality. This area was transferred to Gjesdal Municipality because there was no road connection from Dirdal to the rest of Forsand Municipality, but there was a road connection to the rest of Gjesdal Municipality.

Dirdal was the scene of fierce fighting between Norwegian and German soldiers during Nazi Germany's assault on Norway (Operation Weserübung) in April 1940.
