= Dirdal Church =

Church in Rogaland, Norway

- Dirdal kirke
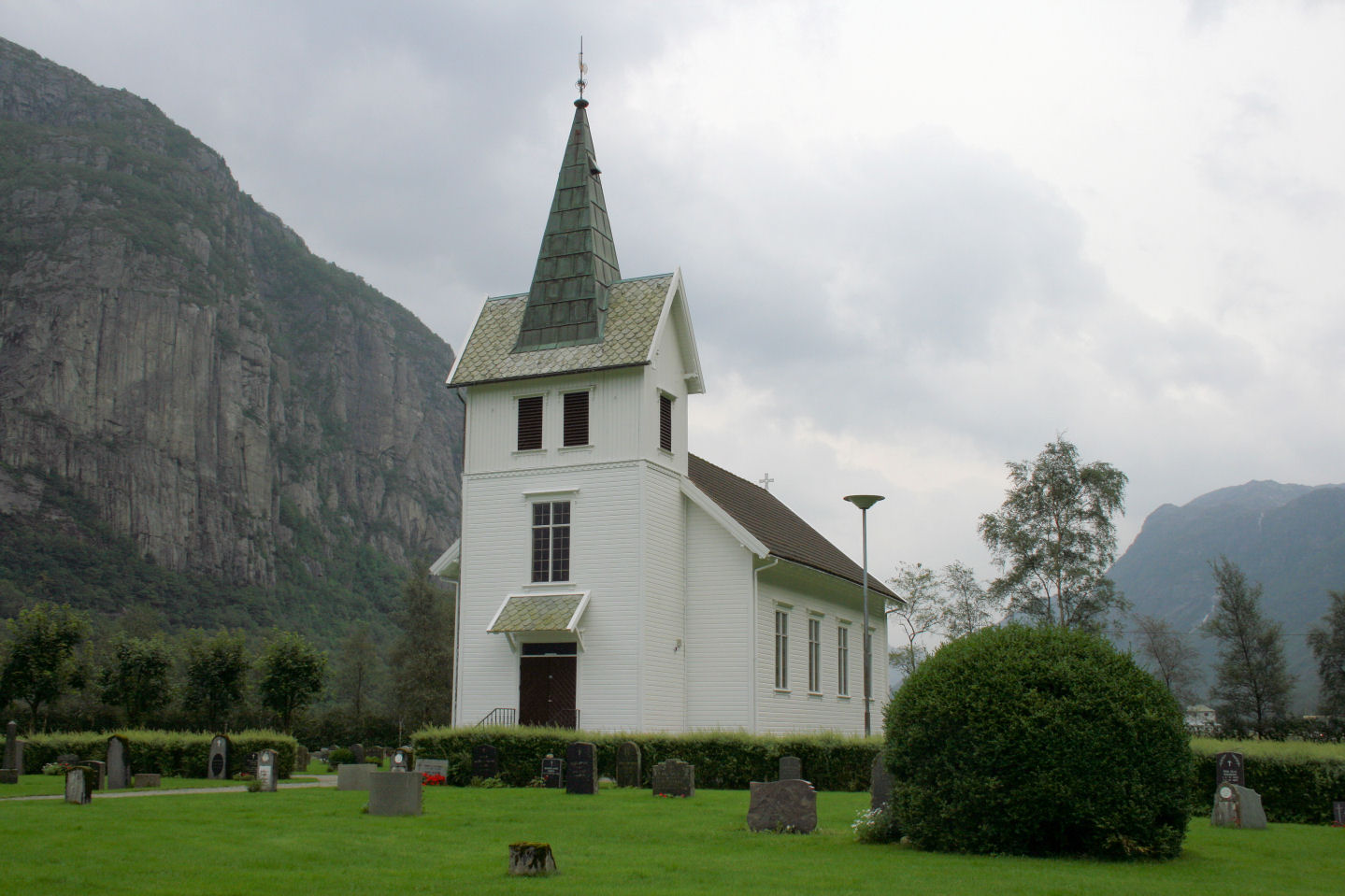
- View of the church
- Dirdal Church
- 58.8272°N 6.1901°E
- Location: Gjesdal Municipality, Rogaland
- Country: Norway
- Denomination: Church of Norway
- Churchmanship: Evangelical Lutheran

History
- Status: Parish church
- Founded: 1903
- Consecrated: 9 Dec 1903

Architecture
- Functional status: Active
- Architect: O.K. Moluf
- Architectural type: Long church
- Completed: 1903 (123 years ago)

Specifications
- Capacity: 175
- Materials: Wood

Administration
- Diocese: Stavanger bispedømme
- Deanery: Jæren prosti
- Parish: Gjesdal
- Norwegian Cultural Heritage Site
- Type: Church
- Status: Not protected
- ID: 84025

Dirdal Church (Norwegian: Dirdal kirke) is a parish church of the Church of Norway in Gjesdal Municipality in Rogaland county, Norway. It is located in the village of Dirdal. It is one of the three churches for the Gjesdal parish which is part of the Jæren prosti (deanery) in the Diocese of Stavanger. The white, wooden church was built in a long church style in 1903 using designs by the architect Ola Knutson Moluf. The church seats about 175 people.

== History ==
In 1889, the villagers of Dirdal received permission to build a cemetery for the residents of the area. Demand for a local church was growing due to the long distances the residents had to travel to get to the nearby Forsand Church. In 1903, the village received permission to build an annex chapel. The new chapel was designed by Ola Knutson Moluf who was from Frafjord. The chapel was consecrated on 9 December 1903. In 2005, the chapel was re-titled as Dirdal Church.

== See also ==
- List of churches in Rogaland
