= Gjesdal (village) =

Village in Gjesdal Municipality, Norway

- Village
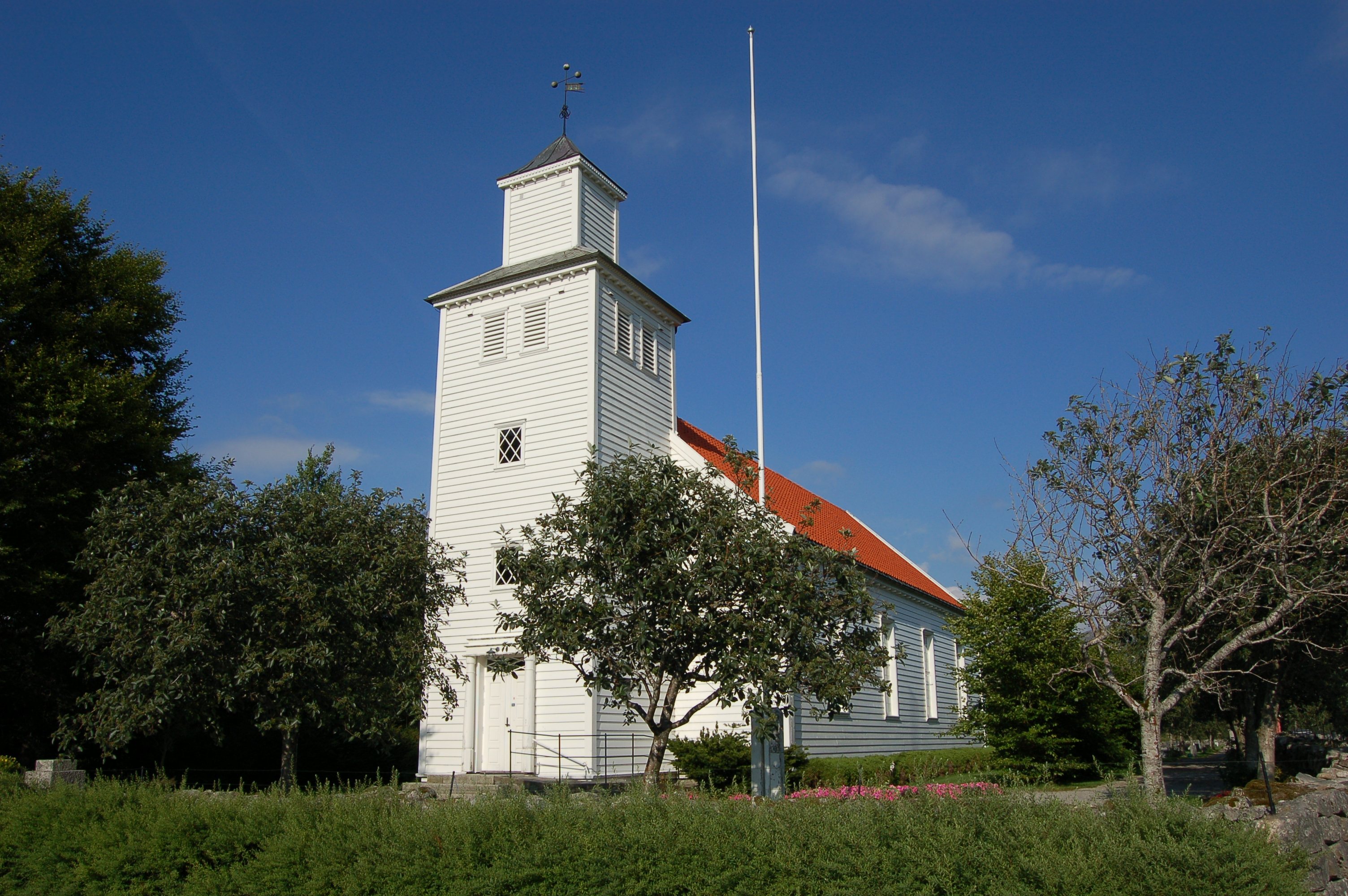
- View of the village church
- Interactive map of Gjesdal
- Coordinates: 58.76758°N 5.94559°E
- Country: Norway
- Region: Western Norway
- County: Rogaland
- District: Jæren
- Municipality: Gjesdal Municipality
- Elevation: 153 m (502 ft)
- Time zone: UTC+01:00 (CET)
  - Summer (DST): UTC+02:00 (CEST)
- Post Code: 4330 Ålgård

Gjesdal is a small farming village in Gjesdal Municipality in Rogaland county, Norway. The village is located just southeast of the lake Limavatnet and about 8 kilometres (5.0 mi) east of the municipal centre of Ålgård. The village is the site of Gjesdal Church. The area is locally referred to as Bygda (lit. 'the village').
