= Liv Godin =

Norwegian missionary (1918–2012)

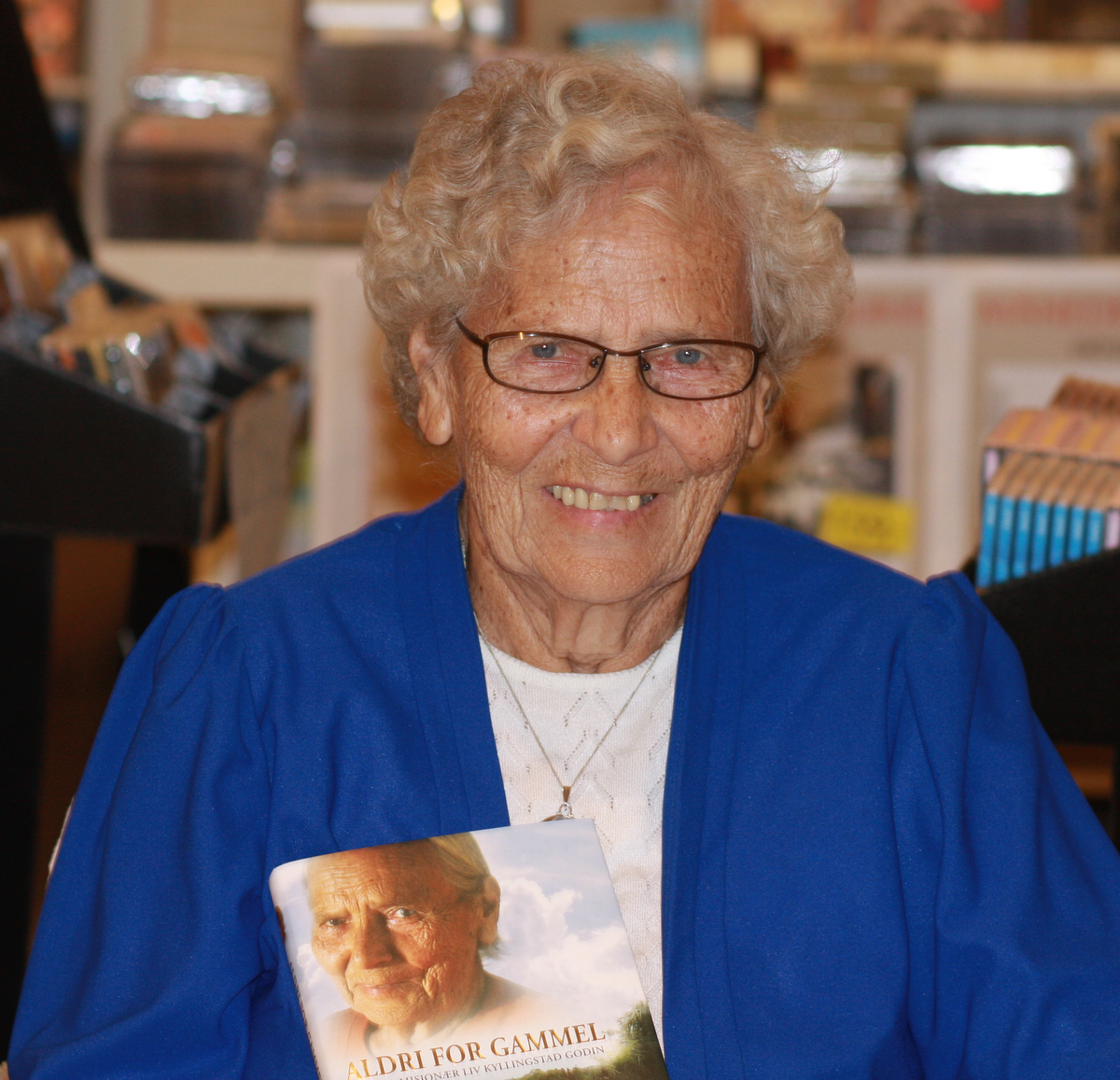
Liv Godin while signing the second biography about her, in 2008.

Liv Kyllingstad Godin (5 March 1918 – 2 January 2012) was a Norwegian missionary in DR Congo.

She was born in Gjestal Municipality. After taking a teacher's education, she worked as a teacher in her native Ålgård from 1966 to 1986. She had already served as a missionary for the Baptist Union in the Congo between 1946 and 1966, and returned to the African country in 1987. Serving until 2011, she returned to Norway after breaking her femoral neck, and died in January 2012.

In 1999 she was voted "Rogaland Citizen of the Century" in regional newspaper Stavanger Aftenblad. She was also awarded the King's Medal of Merit in silver. After her death, a bridge was named after her in Ålgård. She has also been biographed twice.
