= Gjesdal Municipality =

Municipality in Rogaland, Norway

Gjesdal Municipality Gjesdal kommune
- Municipality
- Gjestal herred (historic name); Gjæsdal herred (historic name)
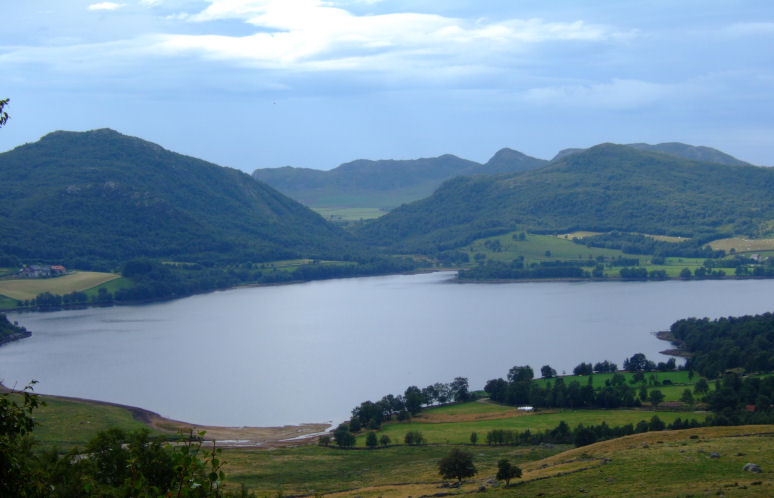
- View of the Gjesdal landscape

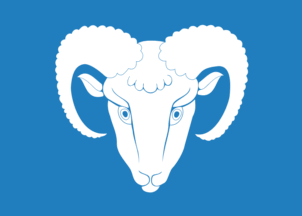
- Flag Coat of arms

- Rogaland within Norway

- Gjesdal within Rogaland
- Coordinates: 58°46′55″N 06°00′31″E
- Country: Norway
- County: Rogaland
- District: Jæren
- Established: 1 Jan 1838
  - Created as: Formannskapsdistrikt
- Administrative centre: Ålgård

Government
  - Mayor (2013): Frode Fjeldsbø (Ap)

Area
  - Total: 617.98 km^{2} (238.60 sq mi)
  - Land: 558.09 km^{2} (215.48 sq mi)
  - Water: 59.89 km^{2} (23.12 sq mi) 9.7%
  - Rank: #186 in Norway
- Highest elevation: 1,141.49 m (3,745.0 ft)

Population (2026)
  - Total: 12,715
  - Rank: #95 in Norway
  - Density: 20.6/km^{2} (53/sq mi)
  - Change (10 years): ▲ +7.3%
- Demonym: Gjesdalbu

Official language
  - Norwegian form: Neutral
- Time zone: UTC+01:00 (CET)
  - Summer (DST): UTC+02:00 (CEST)
- ISO 3166 code: NO-1122
- Website: Official website

Gjesdal is a municipality in Rogaland county, Norway. It is located in the traditional district of Jæren. The administrative centre of the municipality is the village of Ålgård. Other villages in Gjesdal Municipality include Dirdal, Frafjord, Gilja, Gjesdal, and Oltedal. The municipality lies about 25 kilometres (16 mi) to the southwest of the city of Stavanger in southwestern Norway.

The European route E39 highway runs through the western side of the municipality. On the east side of the municipality, the Frafjord Tunnel connects the Frafjord valley with the rest of the municipality.

The 617.98-square-kilometre (238.60 sq mi) municipality is the 186th largest by area out of the 357 municipalities in Norway. Gjesdal Municipality is the 95th most populous municipality in Norway with a population of 12,715. The municipality's population density is 20.6 inhabitants per square kilometre (53/sq mi) and its population has increased by 7.3% over the previous 10-year period.

== General information ==
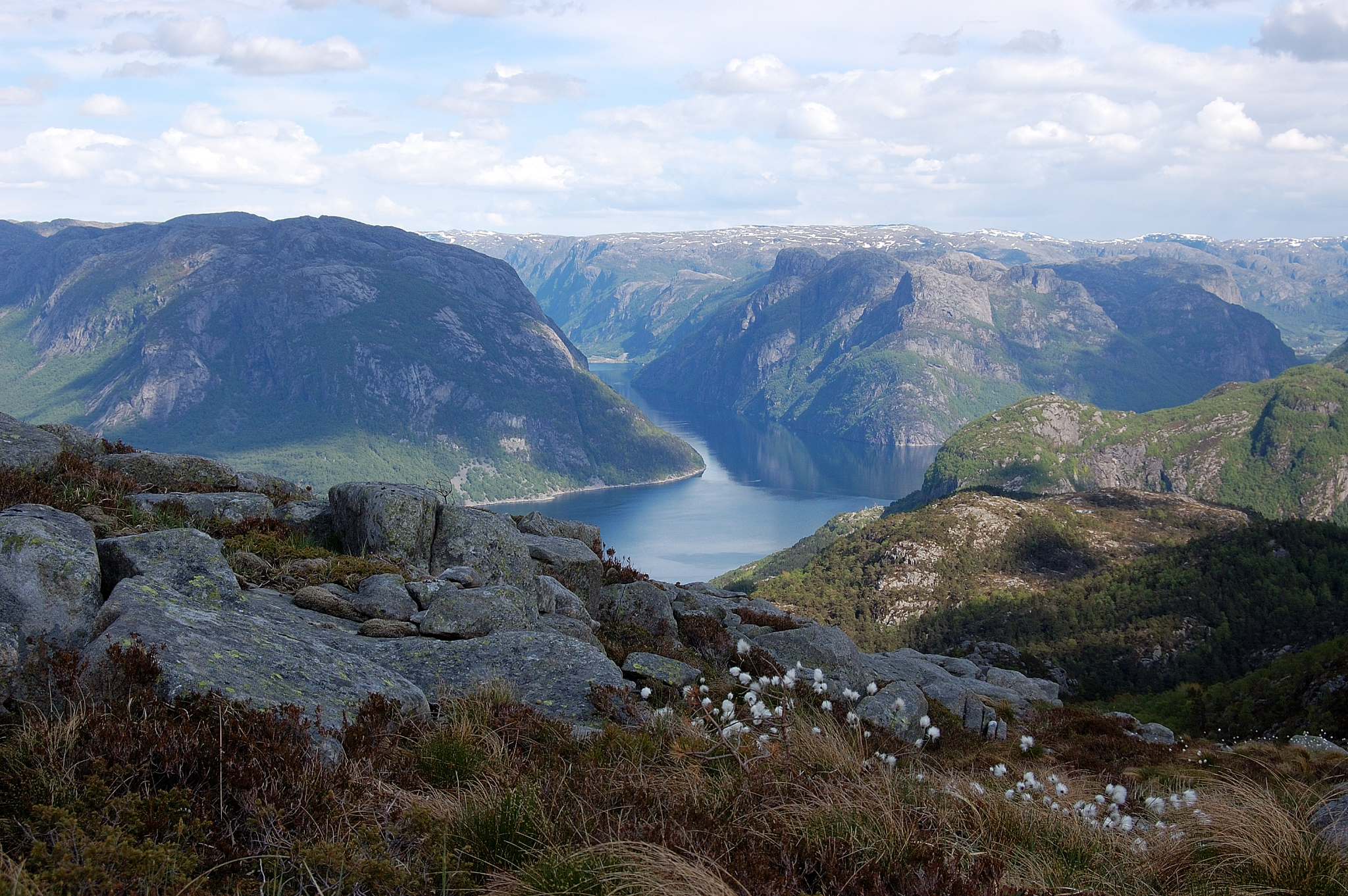
Høgsfjorden in front, Frafjorden in the back, looking east. Gjesdal includes everything in the forefront and right side, Forsand is on the left-back of the fjord.

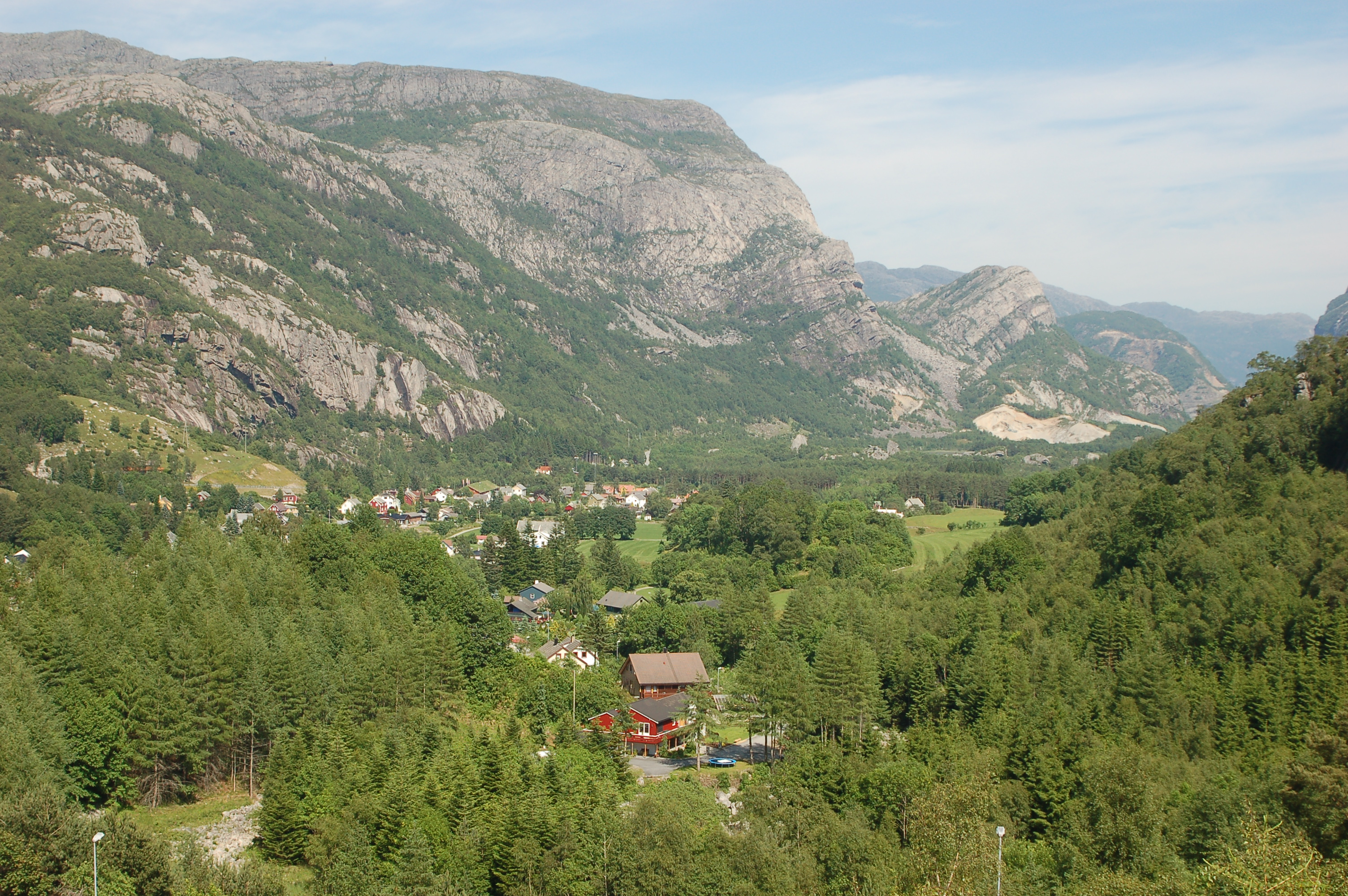
View of Oltedal

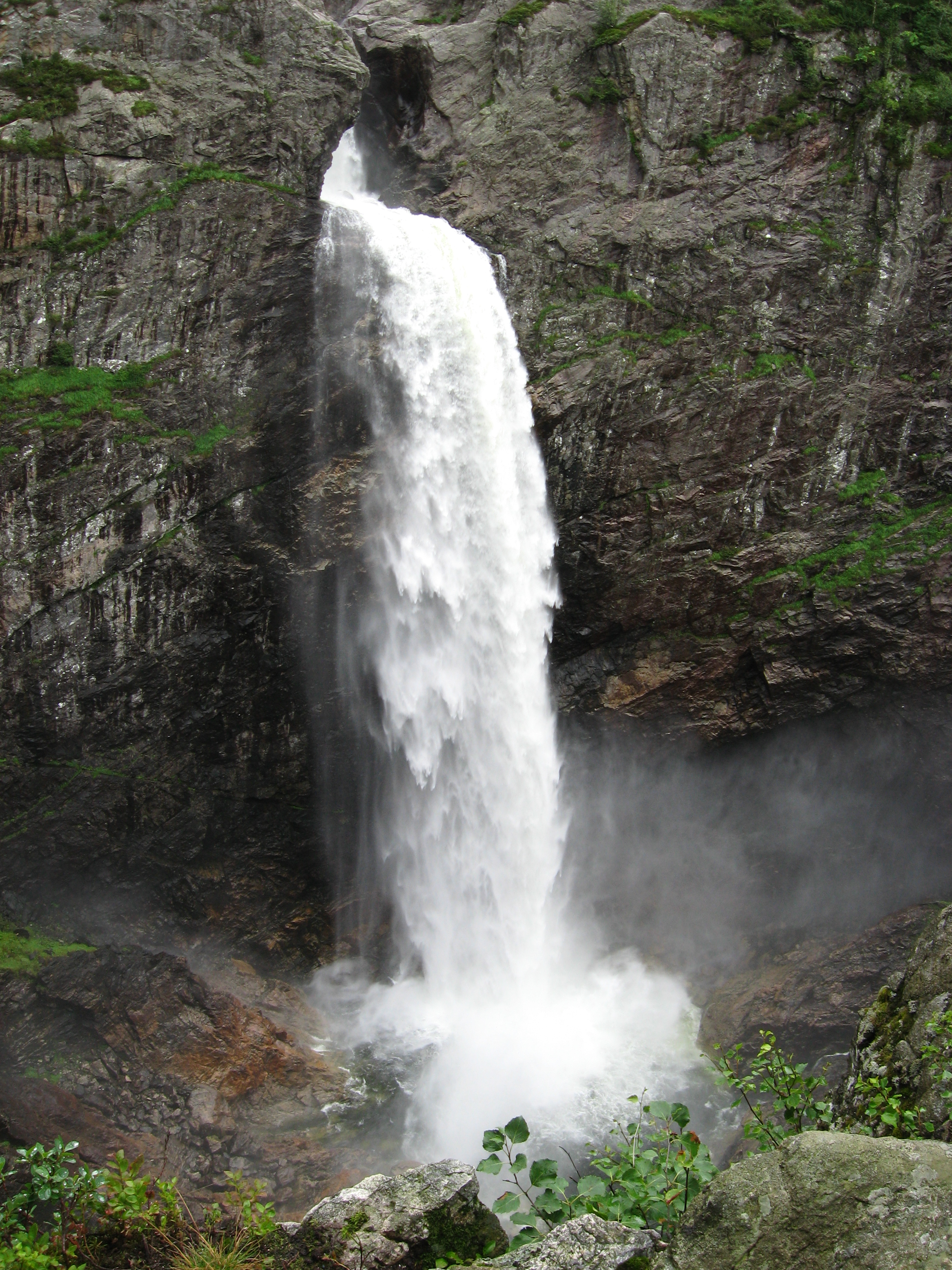
View of the Månafossen waterfall

=== Name ===
The municipality (originally the parish) is named after the old Gjesdal farm (Old Norse: Gesdalir) since the first Gjesdal Church was built there. The first element is probably the old name of the local river, but the meaning is uncertain. The last element is the plural form of dalr which means "valley" or "dale".

Before 1889, the name was spelled Gjæsdal, which is the Danish spelling. During the period from 1889 to 1917 it was spelled Gjesdal (Norwegian language version). On 3 November 1917, a royal resolution changed the spelling of the name of the municipality to Gjestal. This was changed to mimic the pronunciation of the local dialect (the d in dal is pronounced t because of the voiceless consonant s in front). On 26 June 1964, a royal resolution changed the spelling of the name of the municipality back to Gjesdal as part of a border adjustment that was to take effect on 1 January 1965. This change in spelling was made to bring the name back to the etymologically correct form of Gjesdal.

=== Coat of arms ===
The coat of arms was granted on 15 March 1985. The official blazon is "Azure, a ram's head caboshed argent" (Norwegian: I blått et sølv værhode sett forfra). This means the arms have a blue field (background) and the charge is the head of a ram. The ram head has a tincture of argent which means it is commonly colored white, but if it is made out of metal, then silver is used. The ram was chosen as a symbol because sheep breeding and wool manufacturing have both been important throughout the history of Gjesdal. The wool industry was centered in the village of Ålgård where wool, textile, and clothing businesses have thrived. It is also an old heraldic charge, that may be found in a number of 14th century Norwegian seals. It depicts almost identical arms in a seal from 1400 of one Aslak Tordsson. The arms were designed by Kai Wood Moe after a preliminary draft by Jørgen Otteren. The municipal flag has the same design as the coat of arms.

=== Churches ===
The Church of Norway has two parishes (sokn) within Gjesdal Municipality. It is part of the Jæren prosti (deanery) in the Diocese of Stavanger.

Churches in Gjesdal Municipality
Parish (sokn)	Church name	Location of the church	Year built
Gjesdal	Dirdal Church	Dirdal	1903
Gjesdal	Gjesdal Church	Gjesdal	1848
Gjesdal	Oltedal Church	Oltedal	2002
Ålgård	Ålgård Church	Ålgård	2015
Ålgård	Old Ålgård Church	Ålgård	1917

== History ==
The parish of Gjæsdal was established as a municipality in 1838 (see formannskapsdistrikt law). It originally was much smaller than it is today, centered on the Gjesdalen valley in the western part of the present-day municipality.

During the 1960s, there were many municipal mergers across Norway due to the work of the Schei Committee. On 1 January 1965 several areas were merged to form a much larger Gjesdal Municipality:

- all of Gjesdal Municipality (population: 3,353)
- the Nedre Maudal area in Bjerkreim Municipality (population: 40)
- the Oltesvik area along the Høgsfjorden in Høle Municipality (population: 37)
- the southern parts of Forsand Municipality located south and east of the Frafjorden including Dirdal, Frafjord, Byrkjedal, Øvre Maudal, and Østabødal (population: 621)

On 1 January 1970, an unpopulated area of Time Municipality was transferred to Gjesdal Municipality. Then on 1 January 1989, another small, unpopulated area of Time Municipality was transferred to Gjesdal Municipality. Both of these border adjustments were to provide areas for the growing village of Ålgård to expand into.

== Government ==
Gjesdal Municipality is responsible for primary education (through 10th grade), outpatient health services, senior citizen services, welfare and other social services, zoning, economic development, and municipal roads and utilities. The municipality is governed by a municipal council of directly elected representatives. The mayor is indirectly elected by a vote of the municipal council. The municipality is under the jurisdiction of the Sør-Rogaland District Court and the Gulating Court of Appeal.

=== Municipal council ===
The municipal council (Kommunestyre) of Gjesdal Municipality is made up of 27 representatives that are elected to four-year terms. The tables below show the current and historical composition of the council by political party.

Gjesdal kommunestyre 2023–2027
Party name (in Norwegian)	Number of representatives
Labour Party (Arbeiderpartiet)	7
Progress Party (Fremskrittspartiet)	4
Conservative Party (Høyre)	6
Industry and Business Party (Industri‑ og Næringspartiet)	2
Christian Democratic Party (Kristelig Folkeparti)	4
Centre Party (Senterpartiet)	3
Socialist Left Party (Sosialistisk Venstreparti)	1
Total number of members:	27

Gjesdal kommunestyre 2019–2023
Party name (in Norwegian)	Number of representatives
Labour Party (Arbeiderpartiet)	10
Progress Party (Fremskrittspartiet)	4
Green Party (Miljøpartiet De Grønne)	1
Conservative Party (Høyre)	3
Christian Democratic Party (Kristelig Folkeparti)	4
Centre Party (Senterpartiet)	4
Socialist Left Party (Sosialistisk Venstreparti)	1
Total number of members:	27

Gjesdal kommunestyre 2015–2019
Party name (in Norwegian)	Number of representatives
Labour Party (Arbeiderpartiet)	10
Progress Party (Fremskrittspartiet)	4
Conservative Party (Høyre)	4
Christian Democratic Party (Kristelig Folkeparti)	6
Centre Party (Senterpartiet)	3
Total number of members:	27

Gjesdal kommunestyre 2011–2015
Party name (in Norwegian)	Number of representatives
Labour Party (Arbeiderpartiet)	6
Progress Party (Fremskrittspartiet)	5
Conservative Party (Høyre)	6
Christian Democratic Party (Kristelig Folkeparti)	7
Centre Party (Senterpartiet)	2
Liberal Party (Venstre)	1
Total number of members:	27

Gjesdal kommunestyre 2007–2011
Party name (in Norwegian)	Number of representatives
Labour Party (Arbeiderpartiet)	5
Progress Party (Fremskrittspartiet)	6
Conservative Party (Høyre)	3
Christian Democratic Party (Kristelig Folkeparti)	6
Centre Party (Senterpartiet)	3
Socialist Left Party (Sosialistisk Venstreparti)	1
Liberal Party (Venstre)	1
Total number of members:	25

Gjesdal kommunestyre 2003–2007
Party name (in Norwegian)	Number of representatives
Labour Party (Arbeiderpartiet)	5
Progress Party (Fremskrittspartiet)	6
Conservative Party (Høyre)	3
Christian Democratic Party (Kristelig Folkeparti)	6
Centre Party (Senterpartiet)	3
Socialist Left Party (Sosialistisk Venstreparti)	2
Total number of members:	25

Gjesdal kommunestyre 1999–2003
Party name (in Norwegian)	Number of representatives
Labour Party (Arbeiderpartiet)	7
Progress Party (Fremskrittspartiet)	4
Conservative Party (Høyre)	5
Christian Democratic Party (Kristelig Folkeparti)	6
Centre Party (Senterpartiet)	2
Liberal Party (Venstre)	1
Total number of members:	25

Gjesdal kommunestyre 1995–1999
Party name (in Norwegian)	Number of representatives
Labour Party (Arbeiderpartiet)	6
Progress Party (Fremskrittspartiet)	2
Conservative Party (Høyre)	4
Christian Democratic Party (Kristelig Folkeparti)	6
Centre Party (Senterpartiet)	5
Socialist Left Party (Sosialistisk Venstreparti)	1
Liberal Party (Venstre)	1
Total number of members:	25

Gjesdal kommunestyre 1991–1995
Party name (in Norwegian)	Number of representatives
Labour Party (Arbeiderpartiet)	6
Progress Party (Fremskrittspartiet)	1
Conservative Party (Høyre)	4
Christian Democratic Party (Kristelig Folkeparti)	5
Centre Party (Senterpartiet)	5
Socialist Left Party (Sosialistisk Venstreparti)	3
Liberal Party (Venstre)	1
Total number of members:	25

Gjesdal kommunestyre 1987–1991
Party name (in Norwegian)	Number of representatives
Labour Party (Arbeiderpartiet)	8
Progress Party (Fremskrittspartiet)	3
Conservative Party (Høyre)	4
Christian Democratic Party (Kristelig Folkeparti)	5
Centre Party (Senterpartiet)	3
Liberal Party (Venstre)	2
Total number of members:	25

Gjesdal kommunestyre 1983–1987
Party name (in Norwegian)	Number of representatives
Labour Party (Arbeiderpartiet)	8
Progress Party (Fremskrittspartiet)	1
Conservative Party (Høyre)	6
Christian Democratic Party (Kristelig Folkeparti)	5
Centre Party (Senterpartiet)	4
Liberal Party (Venstre)	1
Total number of members:	25

Gjesdal kommunestyre 1979–1983
Party name (in Norwegian)	Number of representatives
Labour Party (Arbeiderpartiet)	7
Conservative Party (Høyre)	7
Christian Democratic Party (Kristelig Folkeparti)	6
Centre Party (Senterpartiet)	4
Liberal Party (Venstre)	1
Total number of members:	25

Gjesdal kommunestyre 1975–1979
Party name (in Norwegian)	Number of representatives
Labour Party (Arbeiderpartiet)	7
Conservative Party (Høyre)	4
Christian Democratic Party (Kristelig Folkeparti)	6
Centre Party (Senterpartiet)	6
Joint list of the Liberal Party (Venstre) and New People's Party (Nye Folkepartiet)	2
Total number of members:	25

Gjesdal kommunestyre 1971–1975
Party name (in Norwegian)	Number of representatives
Labour Party (Arbeiderpartiet)	7
Conservative Party (Høyre)	1
Christian Democratic Party (Kristelig Folkeparti)	5
Liberal Party (Venstre)	4
Local List(s) (Lokale lister)	8
Total number of members:	25

Gjesdal kommunestyre 1967–1971
Party name (in Norwegian)	Number of representatives
Labour Party (Arbeiderpartiet)	8
Liberal Party (Venstre)	4
Local List(s) (Lokale lister)	13
Total number of members:	25

Gjestal kommunestyre 1963–1967
Party name (in Norwegian)	Number of representatives
Labour Party (Arbeiderpartiet)	7
Local List(s) (Lokale lister)	10
Total number of members:	17
Note: On 1 January 1965, Gjestal Municipality was enlarged by adding areas from Bjerkreim, Forsand, and Høle municipalities.

Gjestal herredsstyre 1959–1963
Party name (in Norwegian)	Number of representatives
Labour Party (Arbeiderpartiet)	7
Local List(s) (Lokale lister)	10
Total number of members:	17

Gjestal herredsstyre 1955–1959
Party name (in Norwegian)	Number of representatives
Labour Party (Arbeiderpartiet)	7
Local List(s) (Lokale lister)	10
Total number of members:	17

Gjestal herredsstyre 1951–1955
Party name (in Norwegian)	Number of representatives
Labour Party (Arbeiderpartiet)	6
Local List(s) (Lokale lister)	10
Total number of members:	16

Gjestal herredsstyre 1947–1951
Party name (in Norwegian)	Number of representatives
Labour Party (Arbeiderpartiet)	6
Local List(s) (Lokale lister)	10
Total number of members:	16

Gjestal herredsstyre 1945–1947
Party name (in Norwegian)	Number of representatives
Labour Party (Arbeiderpartiet)	6
Local List(s) (Lokale lister)	10
Total number of members:	16

Gjestal herredsstyre 1937–1941*
Party name (in Norwegian)	Number of representatives
Labour Party (Arbeiderpartiet)	5
Joint List(s) of Non-Socialist Parties (Borgerlige Felleslister)	4
Local List(s) (Lokale lister)	7
Total number of members:	16
Note: Due to the German occupation of Norway during World War II, no elections were held for new municipal councils until after the war ended in 1945.

=== Mayors ===
The mayor (Norwegian: ordfører) of Gjesdal Municipality is the political leader of the municipality and the chairperson of the municipal council. The following people have held this position:

- 1838–1839: Jesper Tjølsen Ravndal
- 1840–1841: Lars Svendesen Oftedahl
- 1842–1843: Christian Davidson Edland
- 1844–1847: Lars Eriksen Berge
- 1848–1852: Christian Davidson Edland
- 1852–1853: Peder Ingebretsen Kyllingstad
- 1854–1860: Aadne Larsen Søiland
- 1861–1867: Jesper Jespersen Ravndal
- 1868–1877: Tore Larsen Bergen
- 1878–1879: Hans Svendsen Næsse
- 1880–1885: Jesper Jespersen Ravndal
- 1886–1887: Torger Johannesen Edland
- 1888–1889: David Olsen Lihme
- 1890–1893: Ole S. Aalgaard
- 1894–1898: Knud R. Kluge
- 1899–1901: Søren Arnesen
- 1902–1907: Knud R. Kluge
- 1908–1916: Sven Nilssen
- 1916–1919: Knud R. Kluge
- 1920–1931: Svein Søyland
- 1931–1941: Velle O. Gjesdal
- 1942–1943: Enevald Haga
- 1944–1945: Olaus Todnem
- 1945–1945: Velle O. Gjesdal
- 1946–1961: K.B. Lima
- 1964–1967: Ingolf Stokkeland
- 1968–1971: Alf Kyllingstad
- 1972–1975: Alf Ravndal
- 1976–1983: Ingolf Stokkeland
- 1984–1987: Rasmus Flesjå (KrF)
- 1988–1991: Inger Sirevåg
- 1992–1999: Svein K. Søyland
- 2000–2007: Karl Edvard Aksnes (KrF)
- 2008–2013: Olaug Vervik Bollestad (KrF)
- 2013–present: Frode Fjeldsbø (Ap)

== Geography ==
Gjesdal Municipality is located in the southern part of the Jæren district in Rogaland county. To the north and northwest, Gjesdal Municipality borders Sandnes Municipality, to the east is Sirdal Municipality (in Agder county), to the south is Bjerkreim Municipality, and to the west is Time Municipality.

Gjesdal Municipality sits at the head of the Høgsfjorden and along the south and east sides of the Frafjorden. The Månafossen waterfall, the largest waterfall in Rogaland county, is located in the Frafjord valley. There are several large lakes in the municipality such as Edlandsvatnet, Flassavatnet, Limavatnet, and Oltedalsvatnet. The Figgjoelva river has its headwaters in Gjesdal Municipality also. The highest point in the municipality is the 1,141.49-metre (3,745.0 ft) tall mountain Strålaus, on the border with Sandnes Municipality.

=== Weather ===
Climate data for Gjesdal
Month	Jan	Feb	Mar	Apr	May	Jun	Jul	Aug	Sep	Oct	Nov	Dec	Year
Daily mean °C (°F)	−0.1 (31.8)	−0.2 (31.6)	1.9 (35.4)	4.8 (40.6)	9.1 (48.4)	12.1 (53.8)	13.4 (56.1)	13.6 (56.5)	11.1 (52.0)	8.1 (46.6)	3.8 (38.8)	1.4 (34.5)	6.6 (43.9)
Average precipitation mm (inches)	126 (5.0)	90 (3.5)	103 (4.1)	65 (2.6)	78 (3.1)	85 (3.3)	108 (4.3)	140 (5.5)	185 (7.3)	195 (7.7)	185 (7.3)	155 (6.1)	1,515 (59.6)
Average precipitation days (≥ 1 mm)	15.5	12	14	11.2	12.5	12.2	13.1	15.3	18.1	18.5	19.1	17.7	179.2
Source: Norwegian Meteorological Institute

== Notable people ==
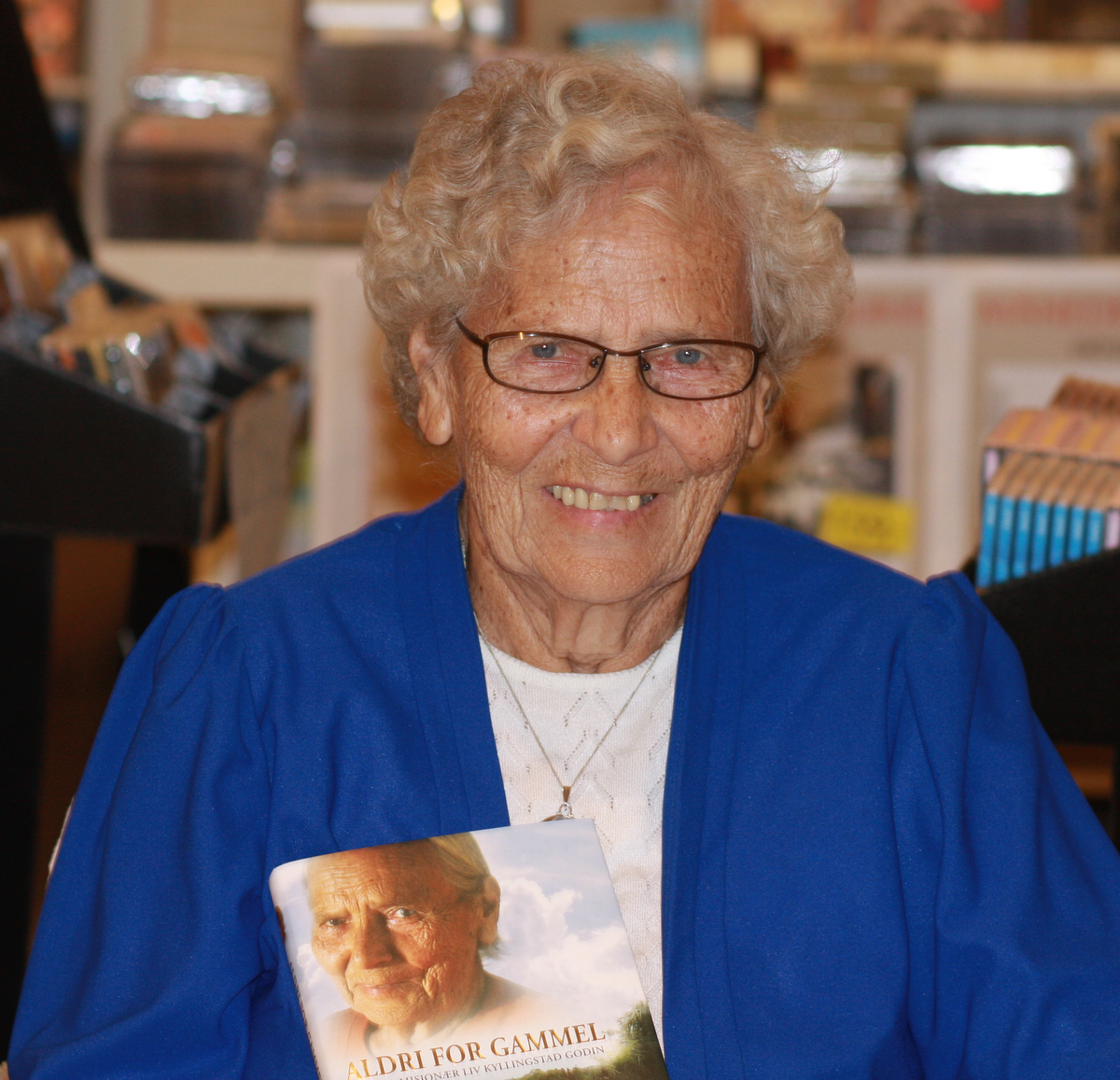
Liv Godin, 2008

- Liv Godin (1918 in Ålgård – 2012), a Norwegian missionary who worked in the Democratic Republic of the Congo
- Finn E. Kydland (born 1943 in Søyland), an economist who was the winner of Nobel Memorial Prize in 2004
- Olaug Bollestad (born 1961), a nurse and politician who was mayor of Gjesdal from 2007–2013
- Dagny Mellgren (born 1978 in Ålgård), a footballer who scored the gold medal goal for Norway at the 2000 Summer Olympics
- Leo Moracchioli (born 1978 in Ålgård), a multi-instrumentalist heavy metal musician and producer based in Oltedal
- Håvard Rugland (born 1984 in Ålgård), a Norwegian American football placekicker, known as "Kickalicious"
