= Høgsfjorden =

Fjord in Rogaland, Norway

Høgsfjord
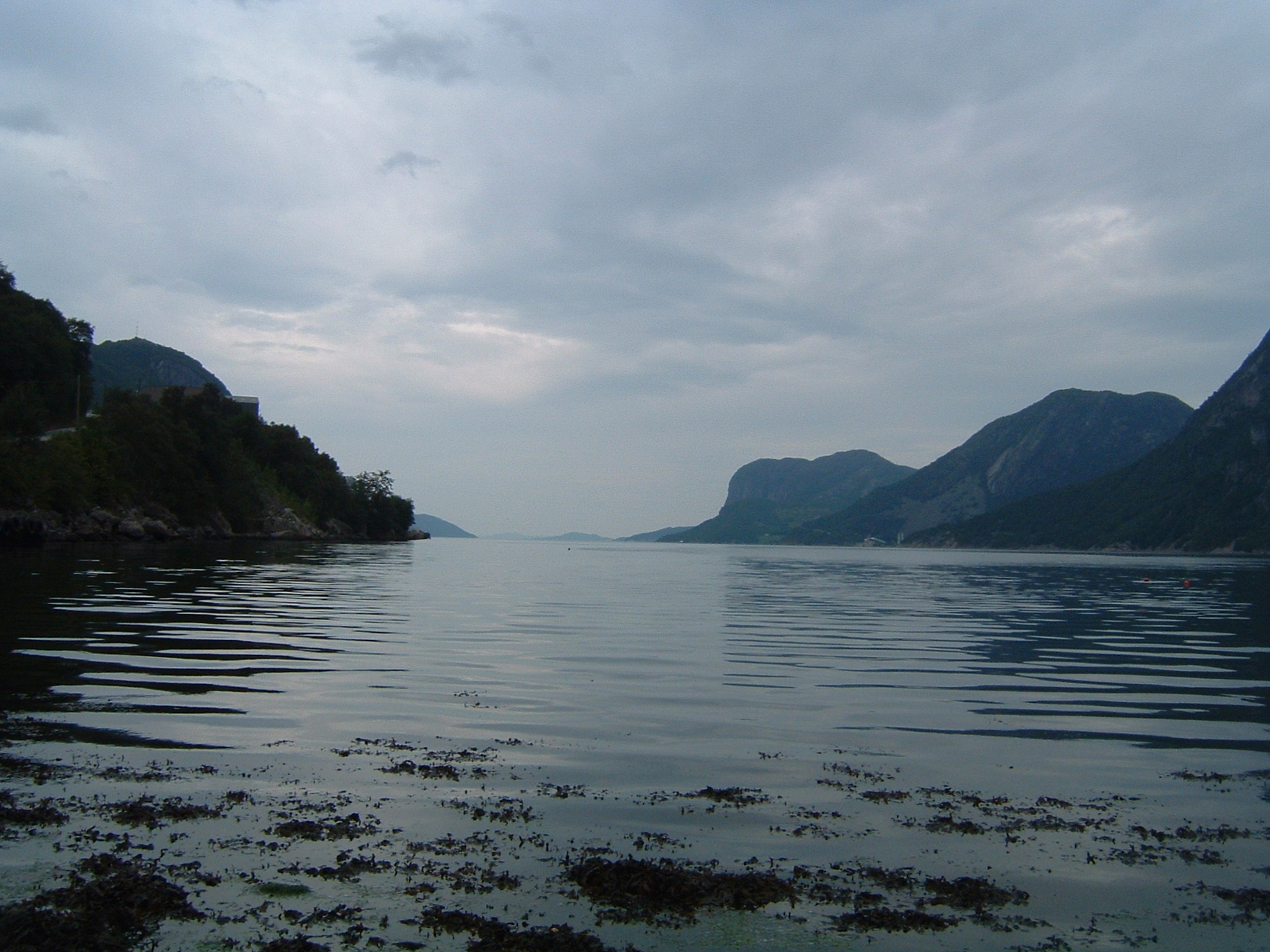
- View of the fjord
- Interactive map of the fjord
- Location: Rogaland county, Norway
- Coordinates: 58.95°N 6°E
- Type: Fjord
- Primary outflows: Boknafjorden
- Basin countries: Norway
- Max. length: 23 kilometres (14 mi)
- Max. width: 1,500 metres (4,900 ft)
- Max. depth: 170 metres (560 ft)

The Høgsfjord is a fjord in Rogaland county, Norway. It lies in Stavanger Municipality, Sandnes Municipality, Strand Municipality, and Gjesdal Municipality. The innermost part of the fjord is located at the village of Frafjord in Gjesdal Municipality. It flows west to Dirdal and then heads northwards. At the village of Forsand, the Lysefjord branches off to the northeast. The Høgsfjorden continues to the northwest past the islands of Idsal and Idse before emptying into the Horgefjorden (just east of the city of Stavanger) and ultimately into the vast Boknafjorden.

The 23-kilometre (14 mi) long fjord is about 1,500 metres (4,900 ft) wide and has a maximum depth of 170 metres (560 ft). The innermost part of the fjord from Dirdal to Frafjord is also known as the Frafjorden. There is a regular ferry crossing about midway through the fjord connecting the villages of Forsand and Høle.

== See also ==
- List of Norwegian fjords
