= Ålgård Church =

Church in Rogaland, Norway

- Ålgård kirke
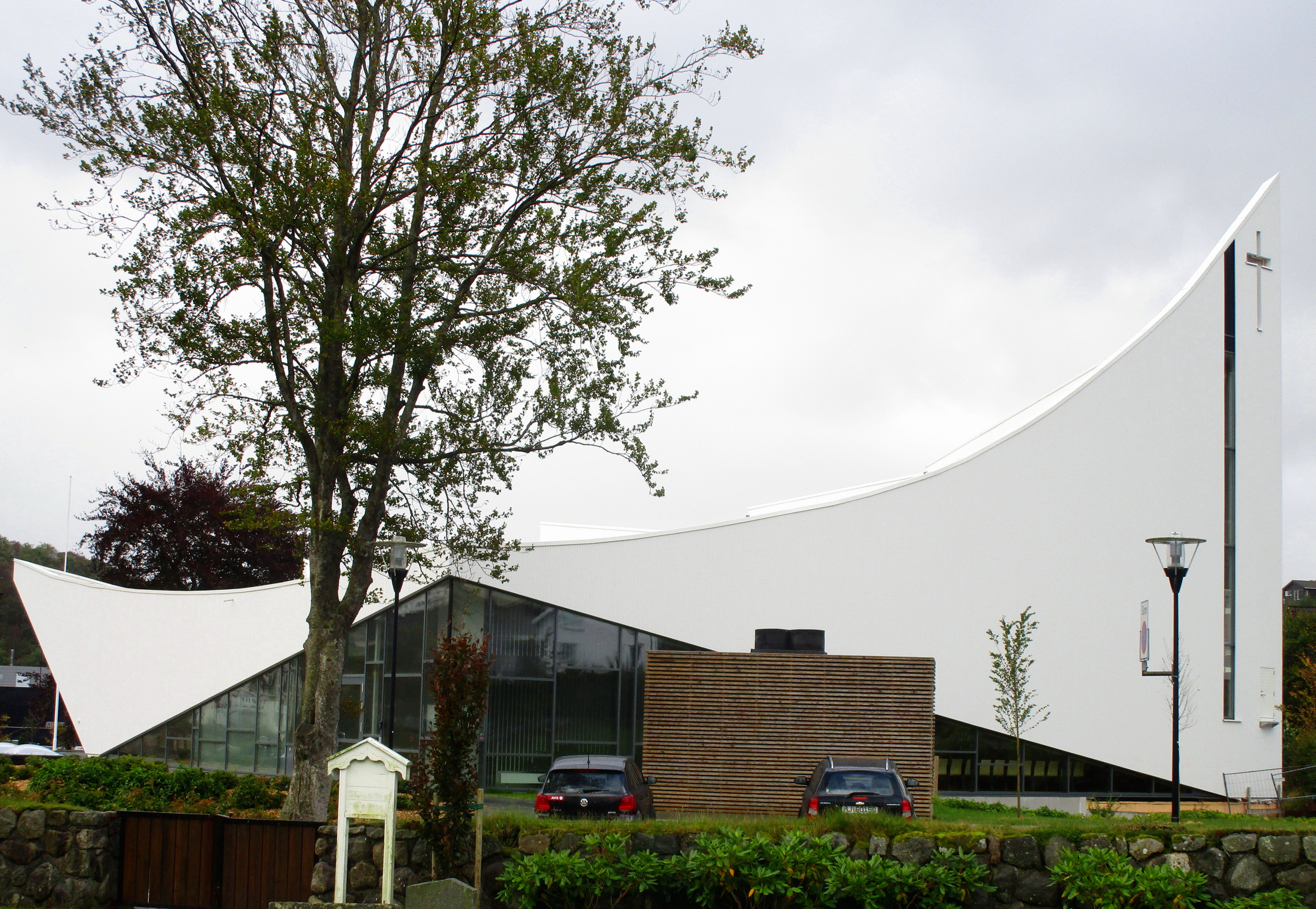
- View of the church (2016)
- Ålgård Church
- 58.768546°N 5.846325°E
- Location: Gjesdal Municipality, Rogaland
- Country: Norway
- Denomination: Church of Norway
- Churchmanship: Evangelical Lutheran

History
- Status: Parish church
- Consecrated: 15 March 2015

Architecture
- Functional status: Active
- Architect(s): René de Groot and Erik Thesen
- Architectural type: Fan-shaped
- Groundbreaking: 25 August 2013
- Completed: 2015 (11 years ago)

Specifications
- Capacity: 500
- Materials: Concrete

Administration
- Diocese: Stavanger bispedømme
- Deanery: Jæren prosti
- Parish: Ålgård

Ålgård Church (Norwegian: Ålgård kirke) is a parish church of the Church of Norway in Gjesdal Municipality in Rogaland county, Norway. It is located in the village of Ålgård. It is the main church for the Ålgård parish which is part of the Jæren prosti (deanery) in the Diocese of Stavanger. The white, concrete church was built in a fan-shaped style in 2015 using designs by the architects René de Groot og Erik Thesen from the firm, Link Arkitektur. The church seats about 500 people.

The church was built in 2015 to replace the Old Ålgård Church (located next door) which was then too small for the congregation. The church was consecrated on 15 March 2015 by the Bishop Erling Johan Pettersen. The 1,800 square metres (19,000 sq ft) church was built at a cost of 54.5 million kr.

On the upper floor is the sanctuary, vestry, two larger meeting rooms, and a smaller room. There is room for 430 people in the sanctuary, but the large doors in the back can be opened up to the entry hall and adjoining rooms, giving the church a maximum capacity of 600. A 12.5-metre (41 ft) high altarpiece designed by Tor Lindrupsen stands at the front of the church. On the lower floor is the 180-square-metre (1,900 sq ft) kitchen, dining hall, church offices, seminar rooms, utility rooms, and closets.

== See also ==
- List of churches in Rogaland
