= Old Ålgård Church =

Church in Rogaland, Norway

- Ålgård gamle kirke
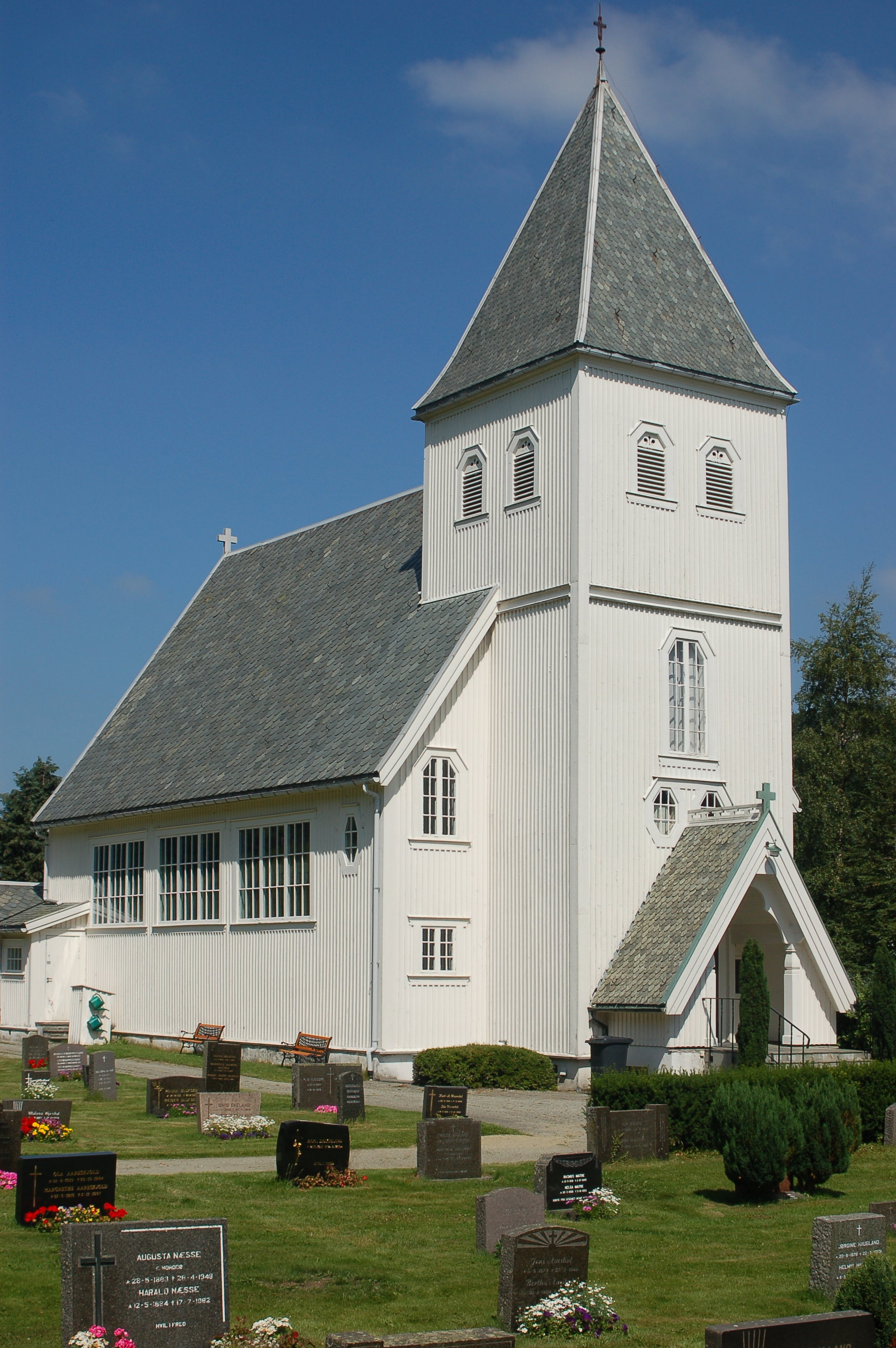
- View of the church
- Old Ålgård Church
- 58.769113°N 5.845365°E
- Location: Gjesdal Municipality, Rogaland
- Country: Norway
- Denomination: Church of Norway
- Churchmanship: Evangelical Lutheran

History
- Status: Parish church
- Consecrated: 11 May 1917

Architecture
- Functional status: Inactive
- Architect: Ole Stein
- Architectural type: Long church
- Style: Art Nouveau
- Groundbreaking: 20 March 1916
- Completed: 1917 (109 years ago)
- Closed: 15 March 2015

Specifications
- Capacity: 250
- Materials: Wood

Administration
- Diocese: Stavanger bispedømme
- Deanery: Jæren prosti
- Parish: Ålgård
- Norwegian Cultural Heritage Site
- Type: Church
- Status: Not protected
- ID: 85960

Old Ålgård Church (Norwegian: Ålgård gamle kirke) is a historic parish church of the Church of Norway in Gjesdal Municipality in Rogaland county, Norway. It is located in the village of Ålgård. It used to be the main church for the Ålgård parish which is part of the Jæren prosti (deanery) in the Diocese of Stavanger. The white, wooden church was built in a long church design and an Art Nouveau style in 1917 using designs by the architect Ole Stein. The church seats about 250 people.

== History ==
Work began on the new church on 20 March 1916 when a groundbreaking ceremony was held. The church was consecrated on 11 May 1917 by the Bishop Bernt Støylen. The church cost about 29,000 kr to build. There are several bullet holes in the exterior of the church that were caused by skirmishes during World War II when the Germans occupied Norway. In the 1960s, the church was renovated and refurbished. After 98 years in use, the church became too small for the congregation and it was replaced in 2015 by the new Ålgård Church, located directly across the street. The old church is no longer used for regular services, but it is used for special occasions such as weddings.

== Media gallery ==
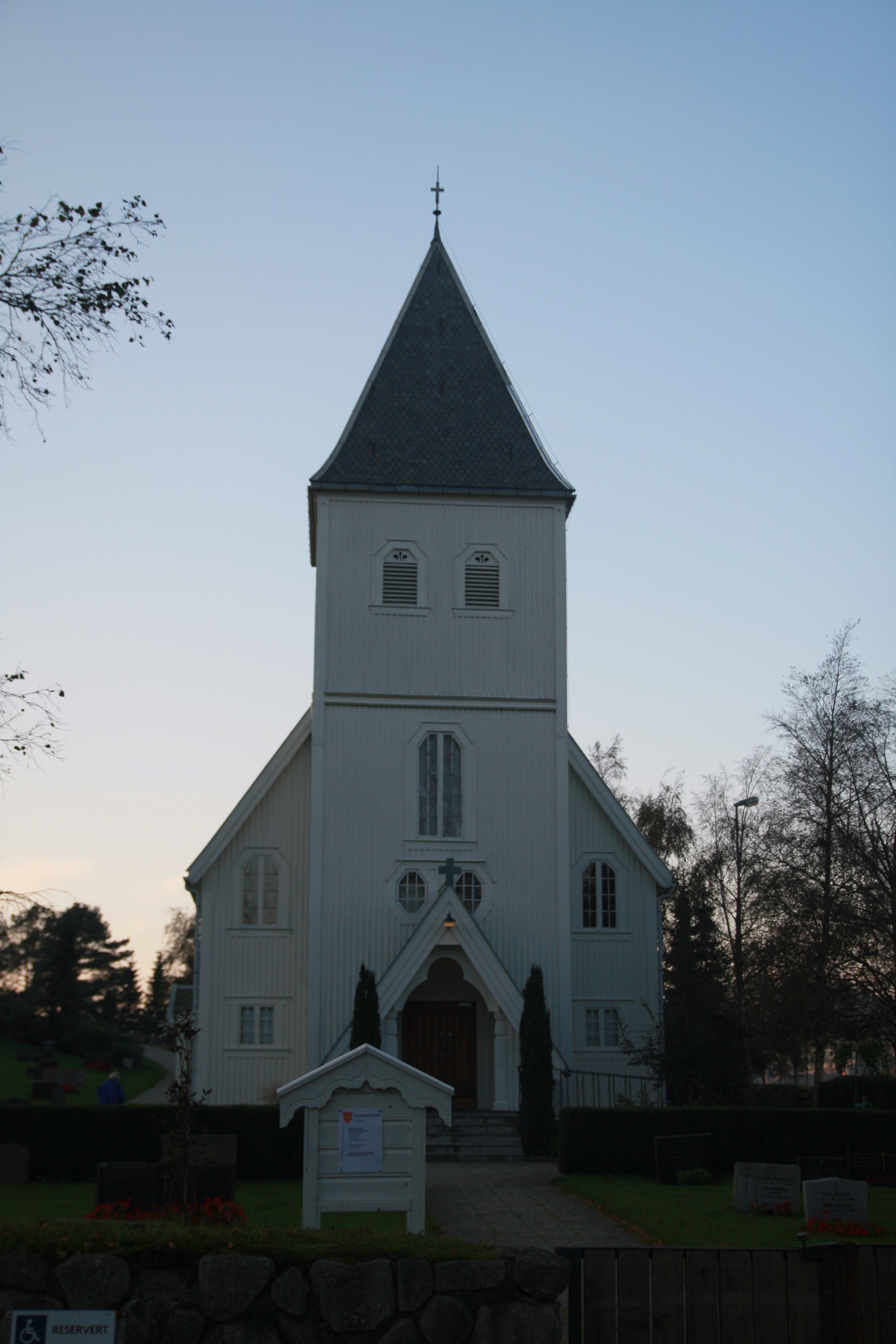

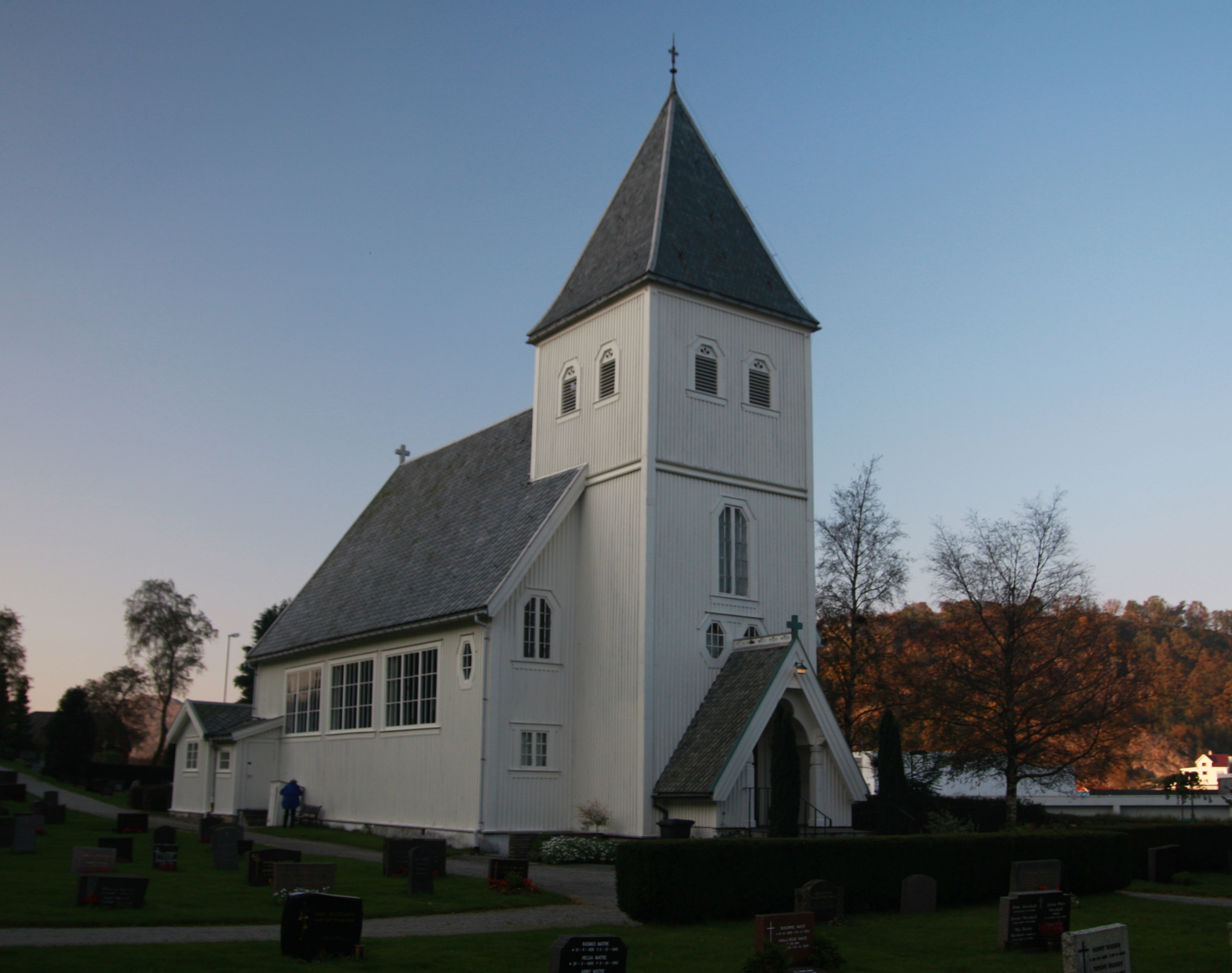

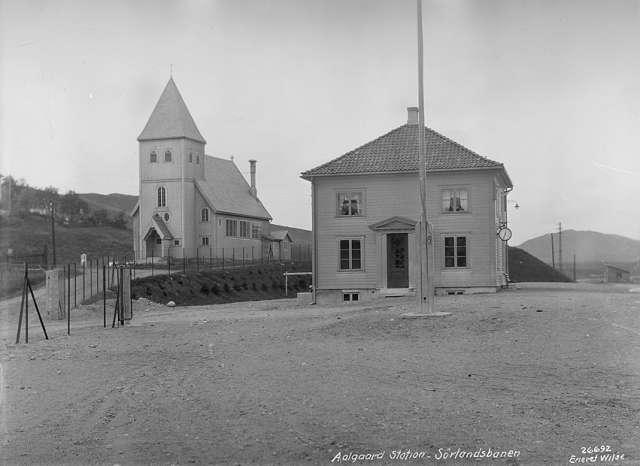

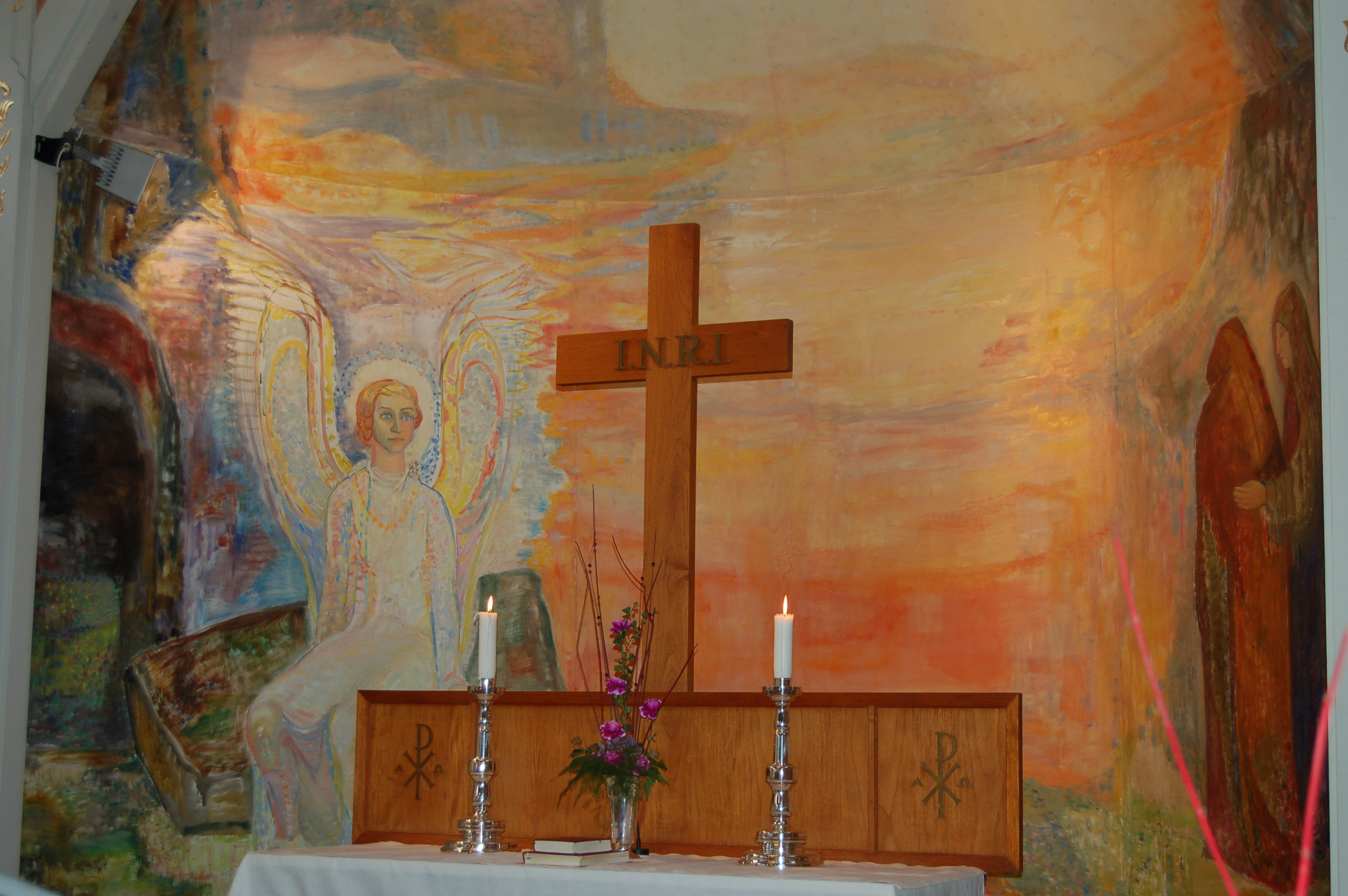

== See also ==
- List of churches in Rogaland
