= Gjesdal Church =

Church in Rogaland, Norway

- Gjesdal kirke
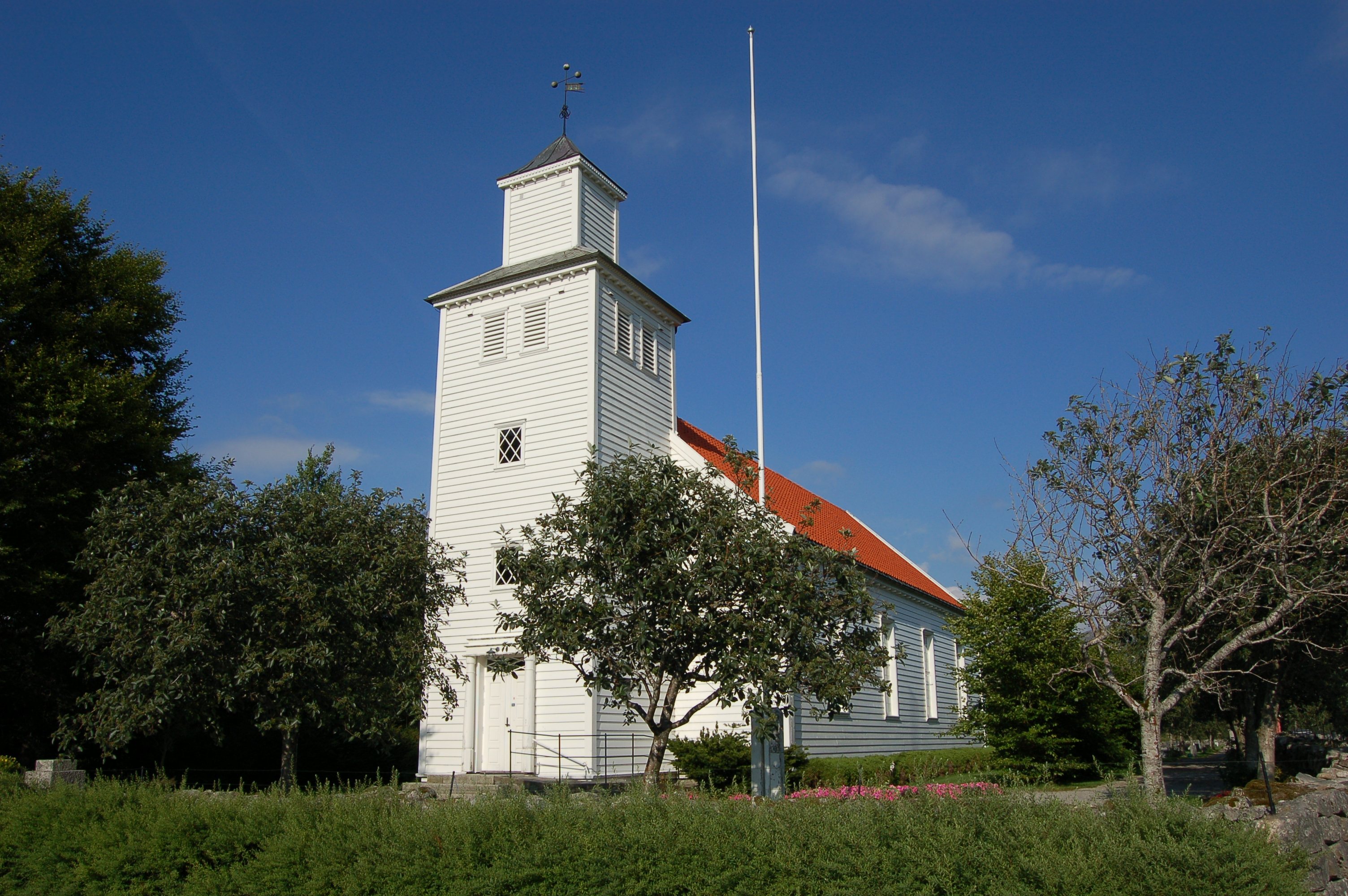
- View of the church
- Gjesdal Church
- 58.773493°N 5.946920°E
- Location: Gjesdal Municipality, Rogaland
- Country: Norway
- Denomination: Church of Norway
- Churchmanship: Evangelical Lutheran

History
- Status: Parish church
- Founded: 13th century
- Consecrated: Oct 1848

Architecture
- Functional status: Active
- Architect: Hans Linstow
- Architectural type: Long church
- Completed: 1848 (178 years ago)

Specifications
- Capacity: 450
- Materials: Wood

Administration
- Diocese: Stavanger bispedømme
- Deanery: Jæren prosti
- Parish: Gjesdal
- Norwegian Cultural Heritage Site
- Type: Church
- Status: Automatically protected
- ID: 84259

Gjesdal Church (Norwegian: Gjesdal kirke) is a parish church of the Church of Norway in Gjesdal Municipality in Rogaland county, Norway. It is located in the village of Gjesdal. It is one of the three churches for the Gjesdal parish which is part of the Jæren prosti (deanery) in the Diocese of Stavanger. The white, wooden church was built in a long church style in 1848 using designs by the architect Hans Linstow. The church seats about 450 people.

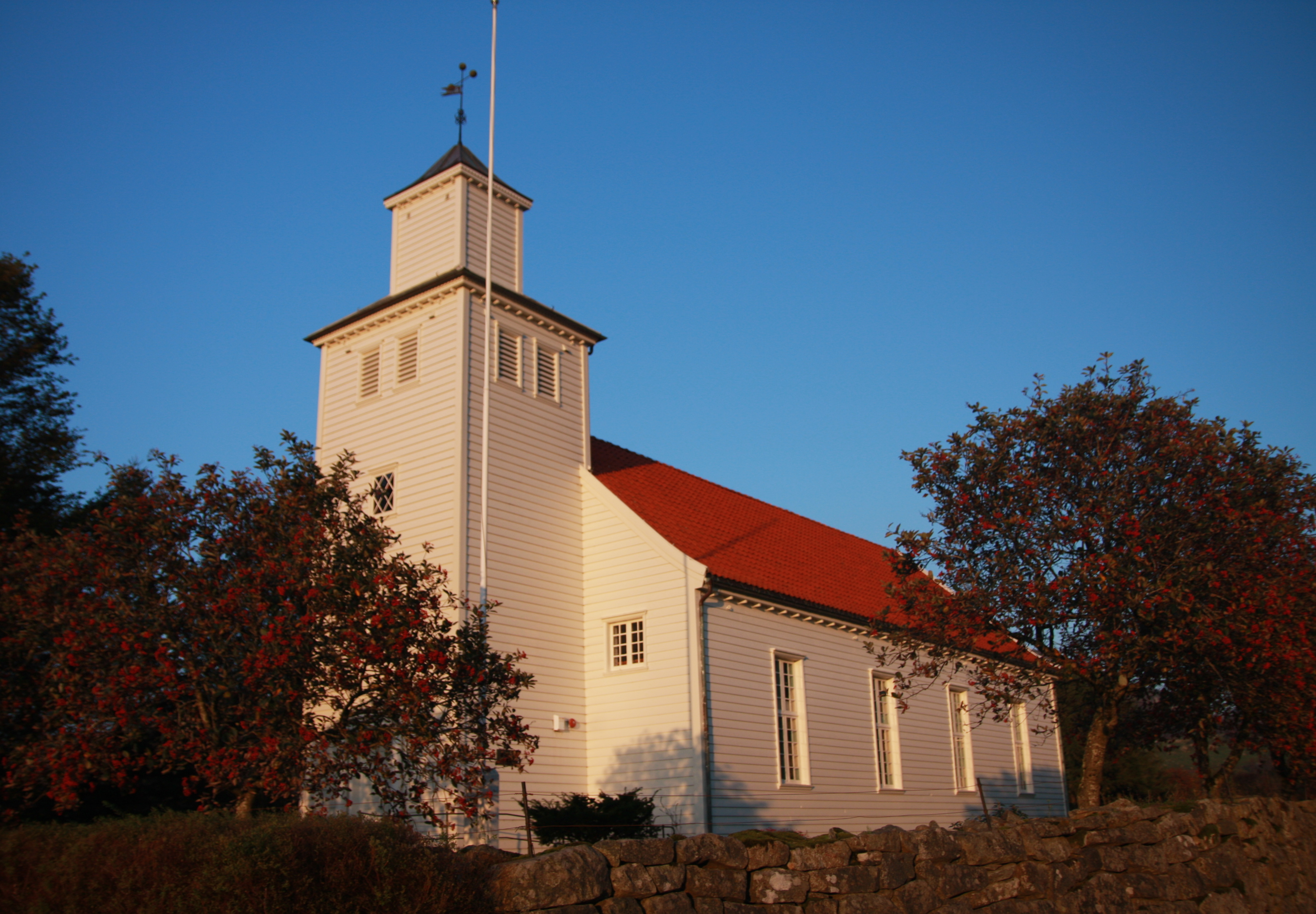
View of the church

== History ==
The earliest existing historical records of the church date back to the year 1395, but the church was likely built during the 13th century. The old stave church existed for many centuries. In 1745, the church was renovated and a new nave was constructed, but the old choir was not changed. In 1802, the nave was again rebuilt. It was extended and widened and the roof was raised higher as well. In the spring of 1848, the church was torn down and its materials were sold at an auction. During the next several months, a new church was rebuilt on the same site. The new church was consecrated in October 1848.

== See also ==
- List of churches in Rogaland
