= Figgjoelva =

River in Rogaland, Norway

Figgjoelva Figgjo
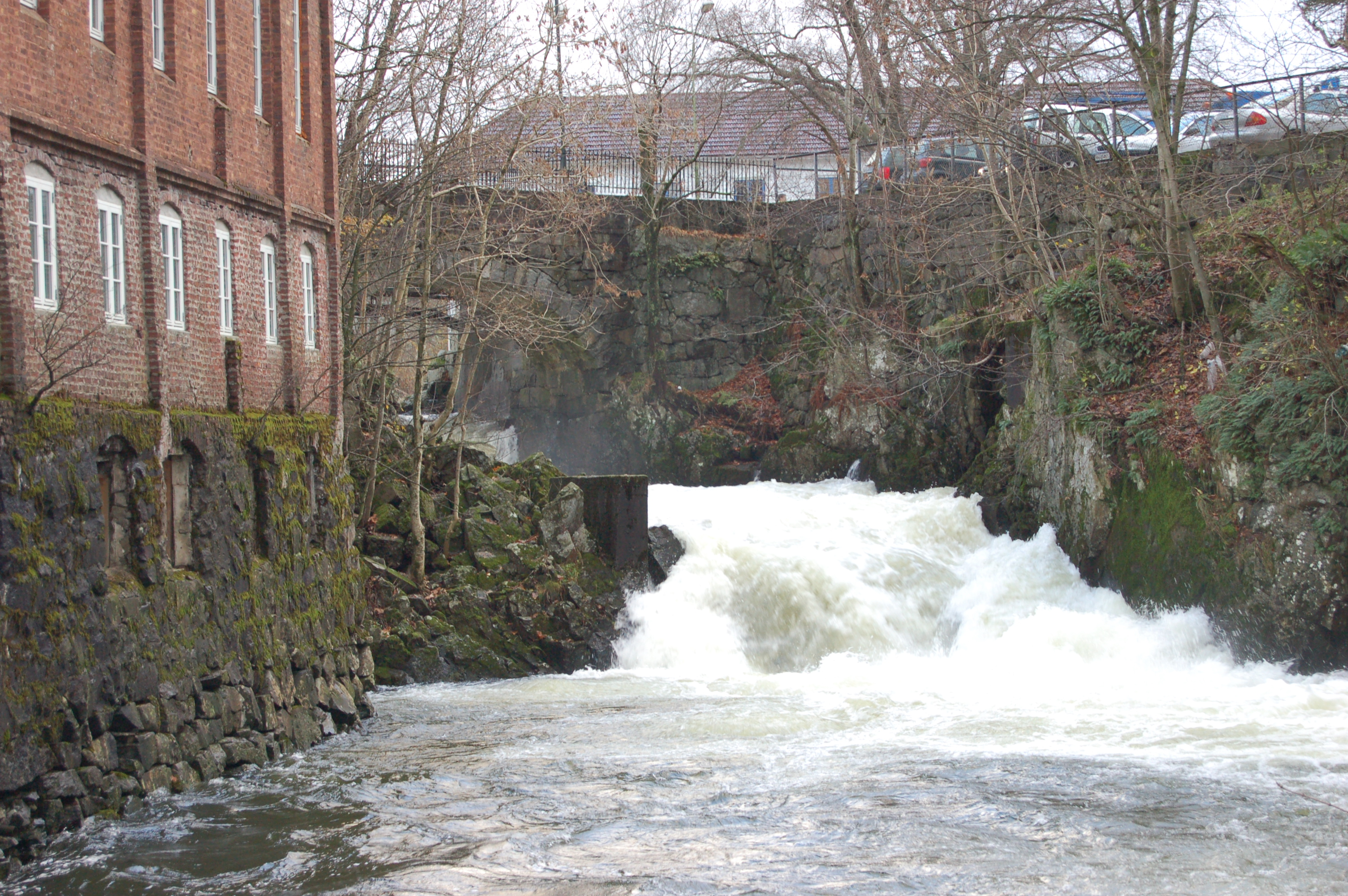
- The waterfall where the river starts in Ålgård. Credit: Rune Sattler

Location
- Country: Norway
- County: Rogaland
- District: Jæren
- Municipalities: Gjesdal, Sandnes, Time, Klepp

Physical characteristics
- Source: Edlandsvatnet
  - location: Ålgård, Gjesdal Municipality
  - coordinates: 58°45′52″N 05°51′21″E
  - elevation: 104 m (341 ft)
- Mouth: Selestranda
  - location: Sele, Klepp Municipality
  - coordinates: 58°48′42″N 05°32′52″E
  - elevation: 0 m (0 ft)
- Length: 26.4 km (16.4 mi)
- Basin size: 232.4 km^{2} (89.7 sq mi)
- Discharge
  - location: Selestranda, Klepp
  - average: 10.53 m^{3}/s (372 cu ft/s)

Figgjoelva or Figgjo is a river in Rogaland county, Norway. The 26.4-kilometre (16.4 mi) long river begins at the lake Edlandsvatnet in the village of Ålgård in Gjesdal Municipality. It then heads north into Sandnes Municipality before heading west. For a while, the river forms the border between Sandnes Municipality and Time Municipality and also between Sandnes Municipality and Klepp Municipality. The last part of the river runs west through Klepp Municipality before emptying into the North Sea. The Feistein Lighthouse lies on a small island, just northwest of the mouth of the river. The main part of the river is 26.4 kilometres (16.4 mi), but if you include the tributaries, the river is about twice as long at 45 kilometres (28 mi).

The river was developed for power generation as early as 1870, but the many small power plants that were built are now mostly closed. The plants led to the development of several industries, particularly in Ålgård. The Aalgaards Uldvarefabrikker, a large wool-textile company based in Ålgård was established in 1870 along with the first power stations.

The river Figgjo was the second largest salmon river in Rogaland county in the year 2000 when 10.6 tonnes (10.4 long tons; 11.7 short tons) of salmon and 677 kilograms (1,493 lb) of sea trout were caught. Historically, the river was also fished for eels. The invasive species, Elodea canadensis (pondweed) has been detected in the river Figgjo as has agricultural pollution, both of which may affect the quality and quantity of fish life in the river.

== See also ==
- List of rivers in Norway
