= Limavatnet =

Lake in Gjesdal, Norway

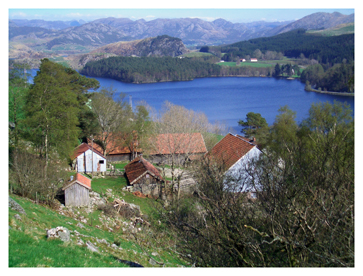
- View of the Limagarden farm, overlooking the lake.
- Interactive map of Limavatnet
- Location: Gjesdal Municipality, Rogaland
- Coordinates: 58.77568°N 5.9151°E
- Basin countries: Norway
- Max. length: 4 kilometres (2.5 mi)
- Max. width: 1 kilometre (0.62 mi)
- Surface area: 1.73 km^{2} (0.67 sq mi)
- Max. depth: 34 metres (112 ft)
- Surface elevation: 104 metres (341 ft)
- References: NVE

Limavatnet is a lake in Gjesdal Municipality in Rogaland county, Norway. The 1.73 km^{2} (0.67 sq mi) lake lies between the villages of Ålgård and Gjesdal. On the western end of the lake, the European route E39 highway crosses the lake on the Vaula Bridge. The lake Edlandsvatnet lies immediately to the west of the bridge.

== Name ==
The hydronym Lima belongs to the lake, but also the adjacent villages of Indre Lima and Ytre Lima. According to Oddvar Nes, that name is likely derived from the Indo-European root "lei-", which means "wet, calm water".

== See also ==
- List of lakes in Norway
