= Edlandsvatnet =

Lake in Gjesdal, Norway

- Interactive map of Edlandsvatnet
- Location: Gjesdal Municipality, Rogaland
- Coordinates: 58.76095°N 5.87338°E
- Basin countries: Norway
- Max. length: 2.3 kilometres (1.4 mi)
- Max. width: 1.3 kilometres (0.81 mi)
- Surface area: 2.11 km^{2} (0.81 sq mi)
- Surface elevation: 104 metres (341 ft)
- References: NVE

Edlandsvatnet is a lake in Gjesdal Municipality in Rogaland county, Norway. The 2.11-square-kilometre (0.81 sq mi) lake lies just south of the large village of Ålgård, immediately southwest of the lake Limavatnet. The European route E39 highway runs along the northern shore of the lake. The lake empties into the river Figgjoelva on the northwestern end of the lake. The lake has many brown trout in it.

== See also ==
- List of lakes in Norway
