= Frafjorden =

Fjord in Rogaland, Norway

Frafjord
- Frafjorden
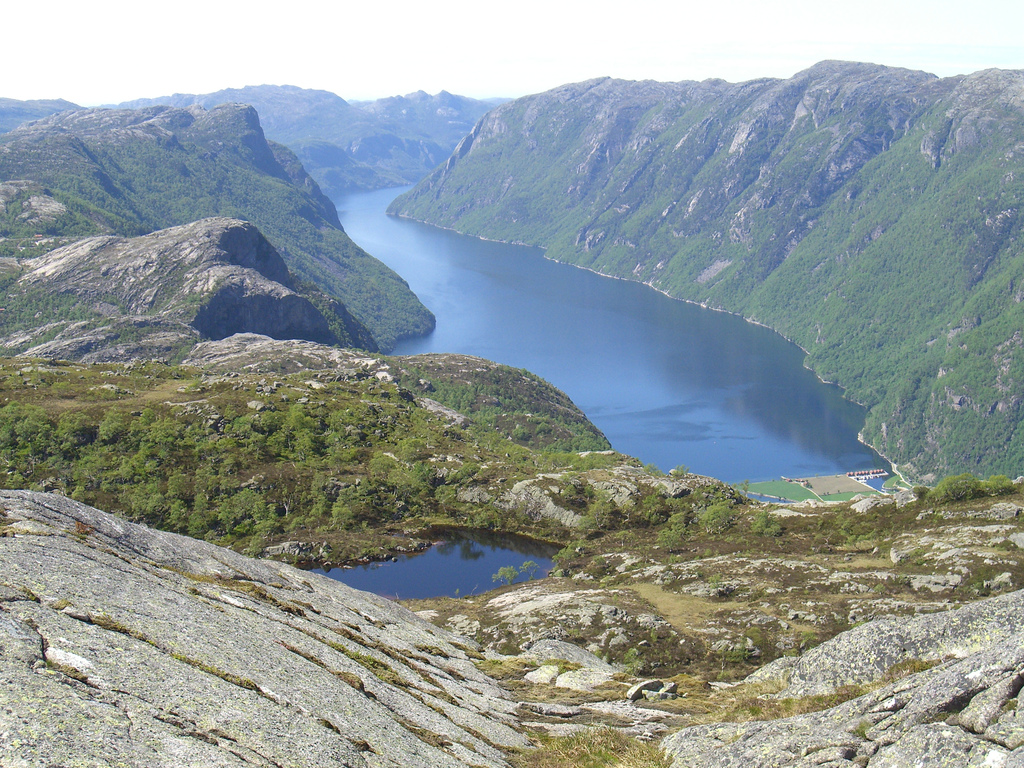
- View of the fjord
- Interactive map of the fjord
- Location: Rogaland county, Norway
- Coordinates: 58.8436°N 6.2353°E
- Type: Fjord
- Primary inflows: Frafjordåna river
- Primary outflows: Høgsfjorden
- Basin countries: Norway
- Max. length: 6 kilometres (3.7 mi)
- Settlements: Frafjord, Dirdal

Frafjorden or Frafjord is a fjord in Gjesdal Municipality and Sandnes Municipality in Rogaland county, Norway. The 6-kilometre (3.7 mi) fjord is the innermost branch of the Høgsfjorden. The Frafjord has steep sides with no habitation along its shores, except for the village of Frafjord at the innermost part of the fjord. The village and the surrounding Frafjorddalen farming valley stretches about 5 kilometres (3.1 mi) east of the fjord and the whole area has about 100 residents. There are also many holiday cottages on top of the high mountain located south of the village of Frafjord. The village of Dirdal is located at the mouth of the Frafjord.

== See also ==
- List of Norwegian fjords
