= Frafjord (village) =

Village in Gjesdal Municipality, Norway

- Village
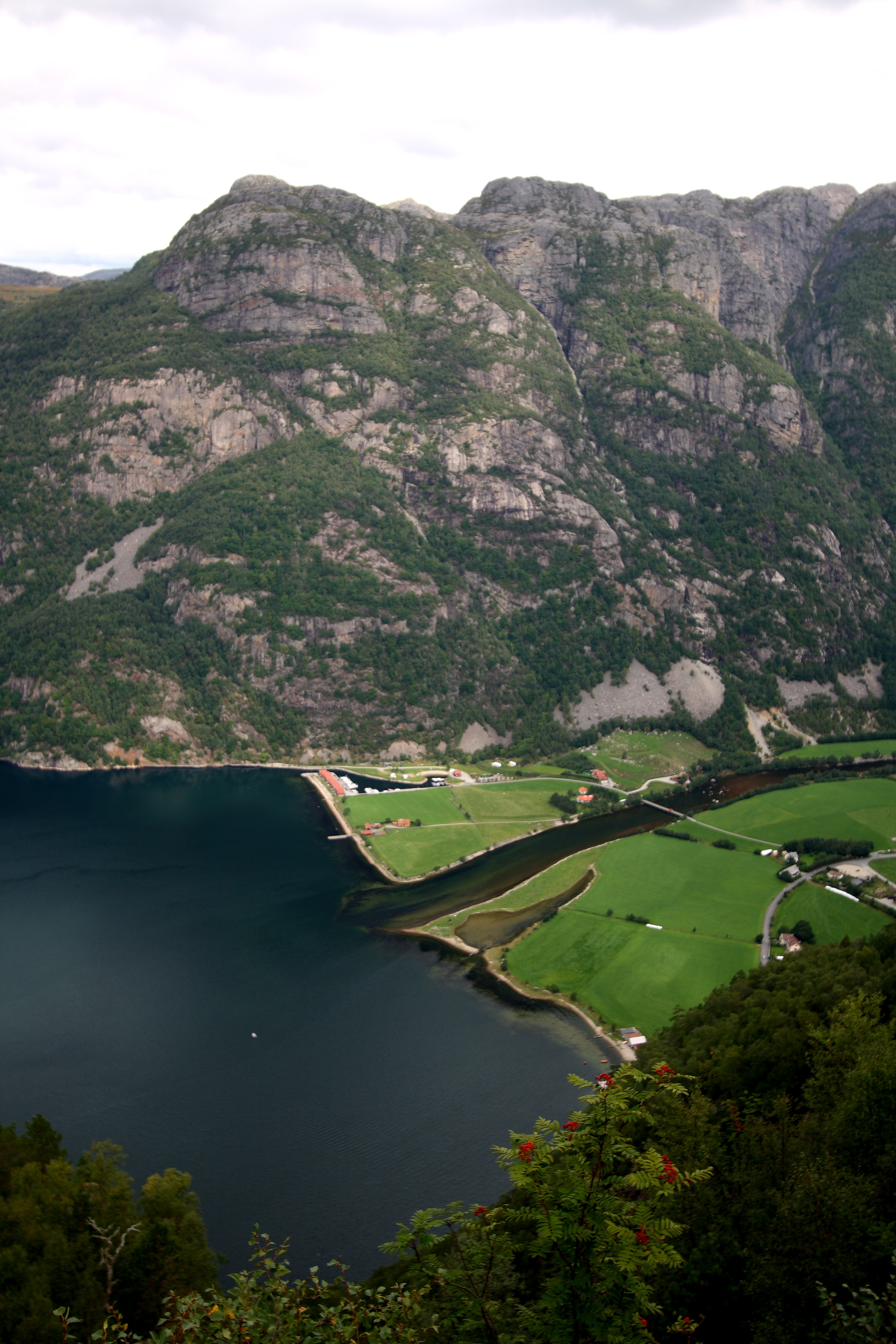
- View of the farming village
- Interactive map of Frafjord
- Coordinates: 58.84304°N 6.30647°E
- Country: Norway
- Region: Western Norway
- County: Rogaland
- District: Jæren
- Municipality: Gjesdal Municipality
- Elevation: 9 m (30 ft)
- Time zone: UTC+01:00 (CET)
  - Summer (DST): UTC+02:00 (CEST)
- Post Code: 4335 Dirdal

Frafjord is a village and farming community in Gjesdal Municipality in Rogaland county, Norway. It is located in the Frafjorddalen valley, at the innermost end of the Frafjorden, a branch of the larger Høgsfjorden. The village had about 100 inhabitants in 2001. The 3.8-kilometre (2.4 mi) long Frafjord Tunnel connects the village of Frafjord to the villages of Gilja and Dirdal on the other side of the mountains, replacing the old, narrow, winding road over the mountain pass. The Månafossen waterfall lies about 5 kilometres (3.1 mi) northeast of the village of Frafjord.
