= Frafjord Tunnel =

Road tunnel in Gjesdal (Norway)

Frafjord Tunnel Frafjordtunnelen
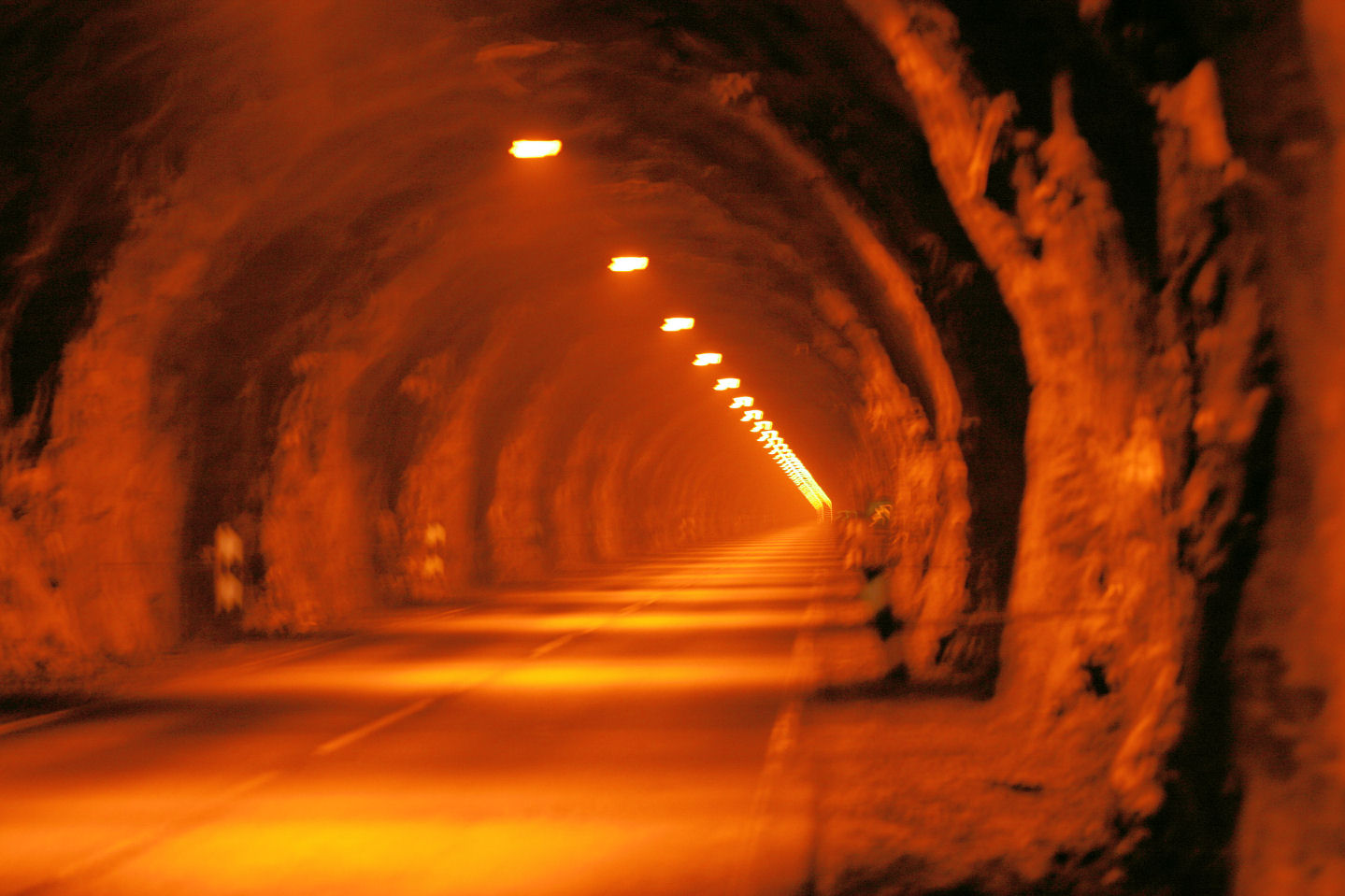
- View of the interior of the tunnel
- Interactive map of Frafjord Tunnel; Frafjordtunnelen

Overview
- Location: Rogaland, Norway
- Coordinates: 58.8388°N 6.2829°E
- Status: In use
- Route: Fv281
- Start: Frafjord
- End: Gilja

Operation
- Opened: 10 June 1999
- Operator: Statens vegvesen

Technical
- Length: 3,812 metres (12,507 ft)
- No. of lanes: 2

The Frafjord Tunnel (Norwegian: Frafjordtunnelen) is a road tunnel in Gjesdal Municipality in Rogaland county, Norway. The 3,812-metre (12,507 ft) long tunnel is located along the Norwegian county road 281 connecting the villages of Frafjord and Gilja which are in two separate valleys with a large mountain between them. The tunnel opened on 10 June 1999 to replace the old, narrow, winding road that crosses the mountain pass above it, making the trip a faster and safer one.
