= Ålgård =

Village in Gjesdal Municipality, Norway

Ålgård Aalgaard (historic)
- Village
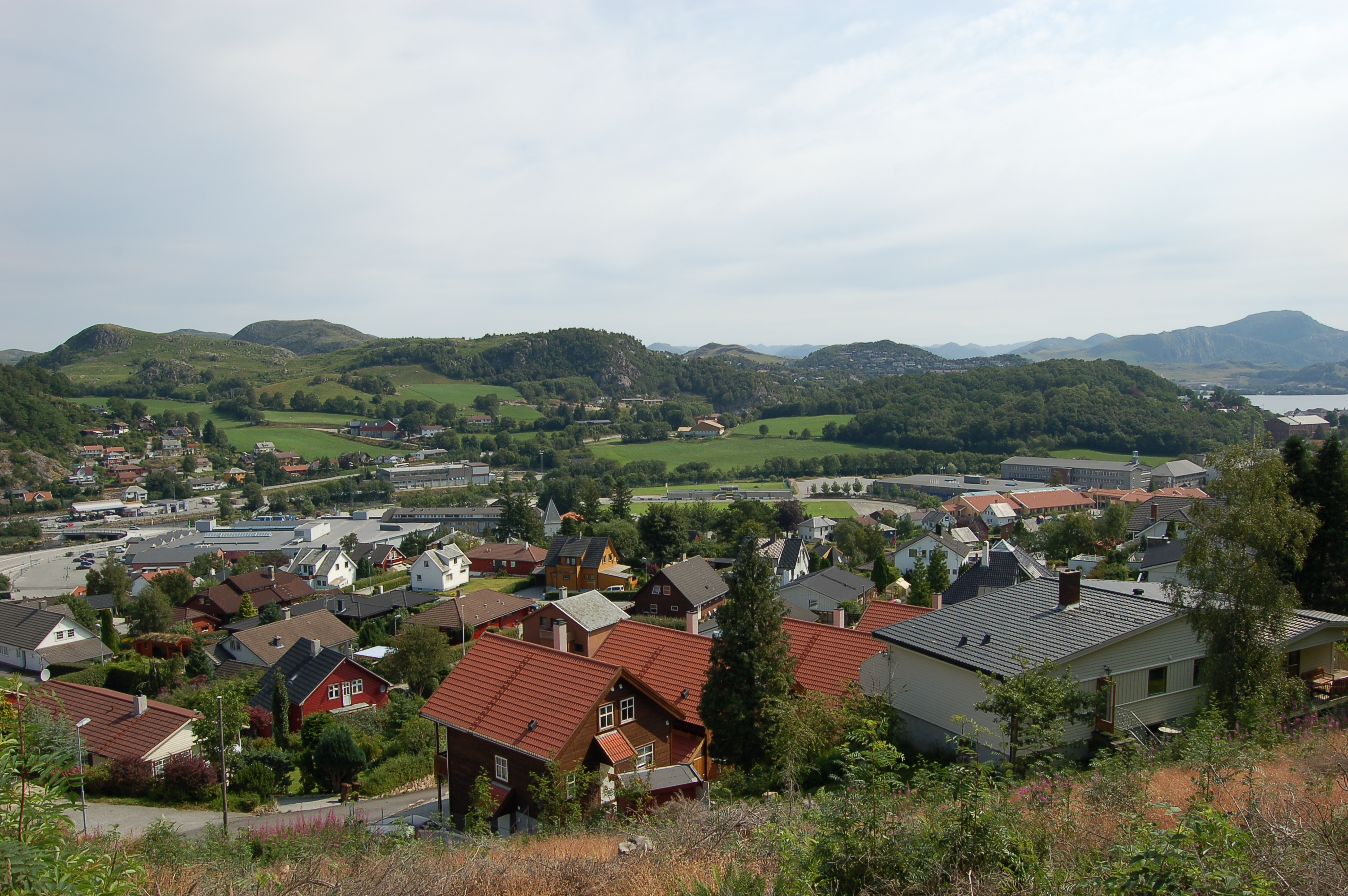
- View of the village
- Interactive map of Ålgård
- Coordinates: 58.76417°N 5.85254°E
- Country: Norway
- Region: Western Norway
- County: Rogaland
- District: Jæren
- Municipality: Gjesdal Municipality

Area
  - Total: 5.3 km^{2} (2.0 sq mi)
- Elevation: 94 m (308 ft)

Population (2025)
  - Total: 12,164
  - Density: 2,295/km^{2} (5,940/sq mi)
- Time zone: UTC+01:00 (CET)
  - Summer (DST): UTC+02:00 (CEST)
- Post Code: 4330 Ålgård

Ålgård is the administrative centre of Gjesdal Municipality in Rogaland county, Norway. The village is located along the European route E39 highway, about 10 kilometres (6.2 mi) southeast of the city of Sandnes in the Jæren district of the county. The village includes the neighborhoods of Ålgård, Bærland, Fiskebekk, Opstad and Solås. The large lake Edlandsvatnet lies on the south side of the village, emptying into the river Figgjoelva which runs northwest to Sandnes.

Ålgård is mostly known for the Kongeparken amusement park, an old wool mill, and a local football team (Ålgård F.K.) playing in the Norwegian Second Division. The Old Ålgård Church (built in 1917) and the new Ålgård Church (built in 2015) are both located in the village. There is significant industries in Ålgård, primarily the wood, textile, and clothing industries.

== Population ==
The village of Figgjo, located in neighboring Sandnes Municipality sits directly adjacent to Ålgård, just over the municipal border. Statistics Norway considers Ålgård/Figgjo to be one large urban area straddling two municipalities. The 5.3-square-kilometre (1,300-acre) village area has a population (2025) of 12,164 and a population density of 2,295 inhabitants per square kilometre (5,940/sq mi). The village area in Sandnes Municipality has 2,290 residents and an area of 1.03 square kilometres (250 acres) while the area in Gjesdal Municipality has 9,874 residents and an area of 4.28 square kilometres (1,060 acres).

== Notable people ==
- Leo Moracchioli (born 1978 in Ålgård), a multi-instrumentalist heavy metal musician and producer based in Oltedal
- Martin Nevland (born 2001 in Ålgård), is a multi-time youth and junior world champion biathlete
- Håvard Rugland (born 1984 in Ålgård), a Norwegian American football placekicker, known as "Kickalicious"

== Media gallery ==
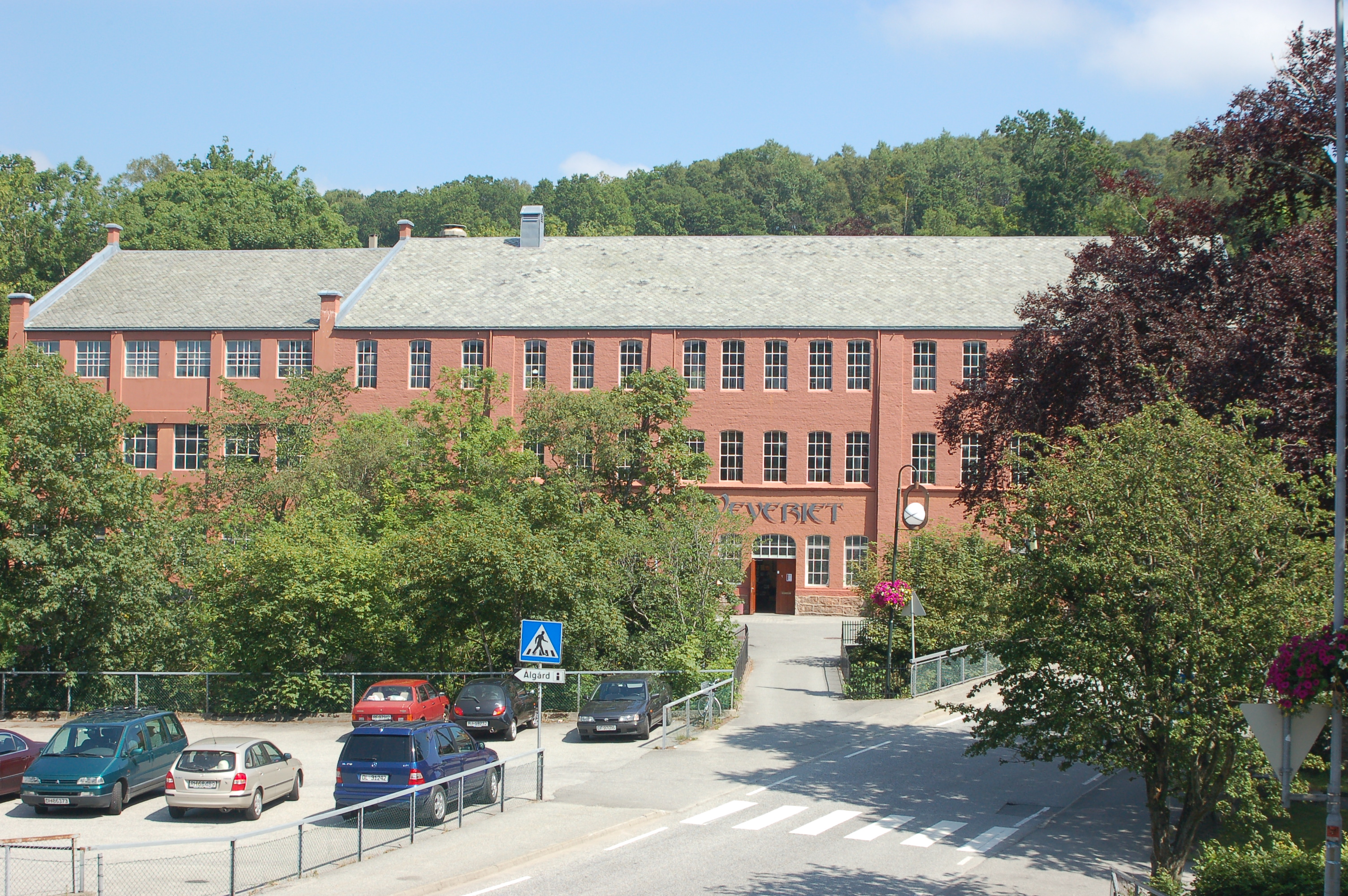
A former wool mill now used as a library and a cultural center

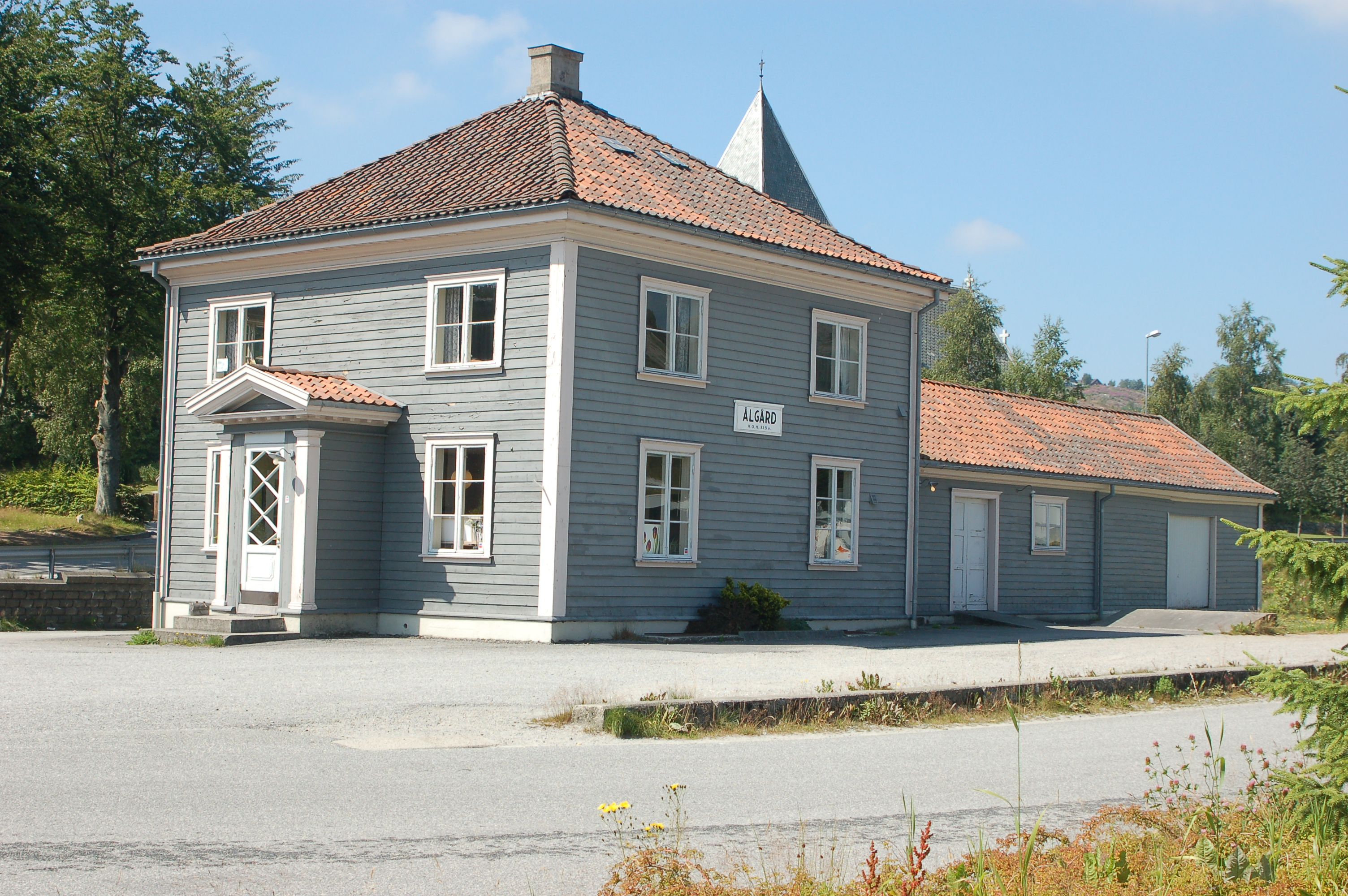
Ålgård Station, a former railway station for Ålgårdbanen

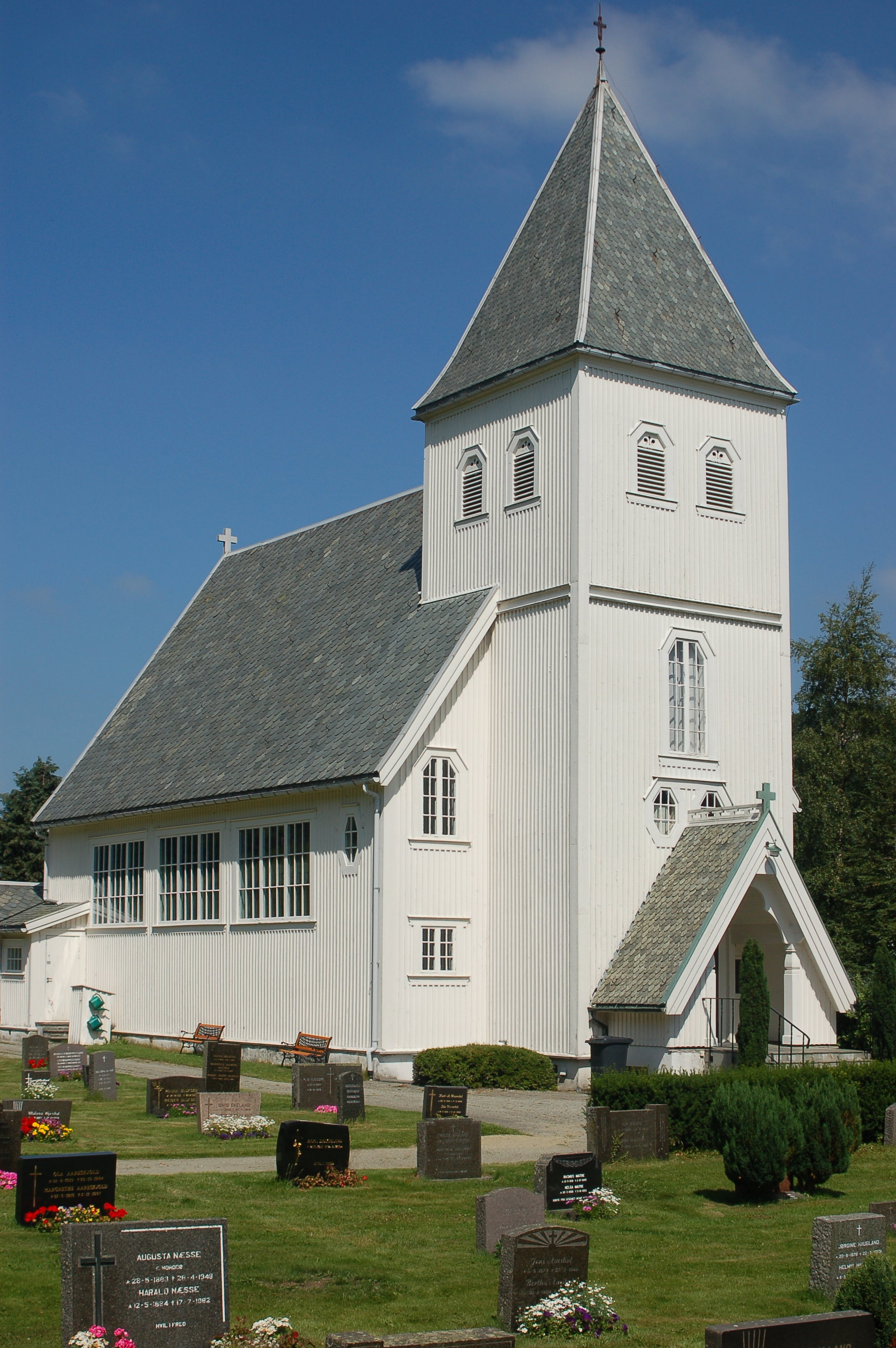
Ålgård Church was built in 1917. The architect was Ole Stein.
