= 2014 in Norway =

- Centuries: 19th; 20th; 21st
- Decades: 1990s; 2000s; 2010s; 2020s
- See also: List of years in Norway

Events in the year 2014 in Norway.

== Incumbents ==
- Monarch – Harald V.
- President of the Storting – Olemic Thommessen (Conservative)
- Prime Minister – Erna Solberg (Conservative).

== Events ==
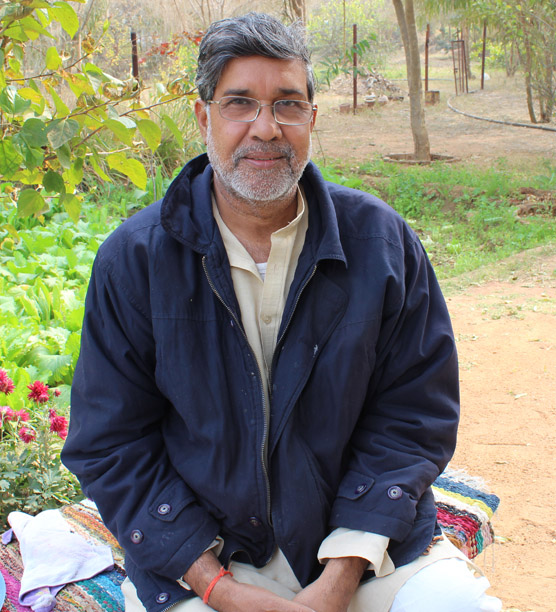
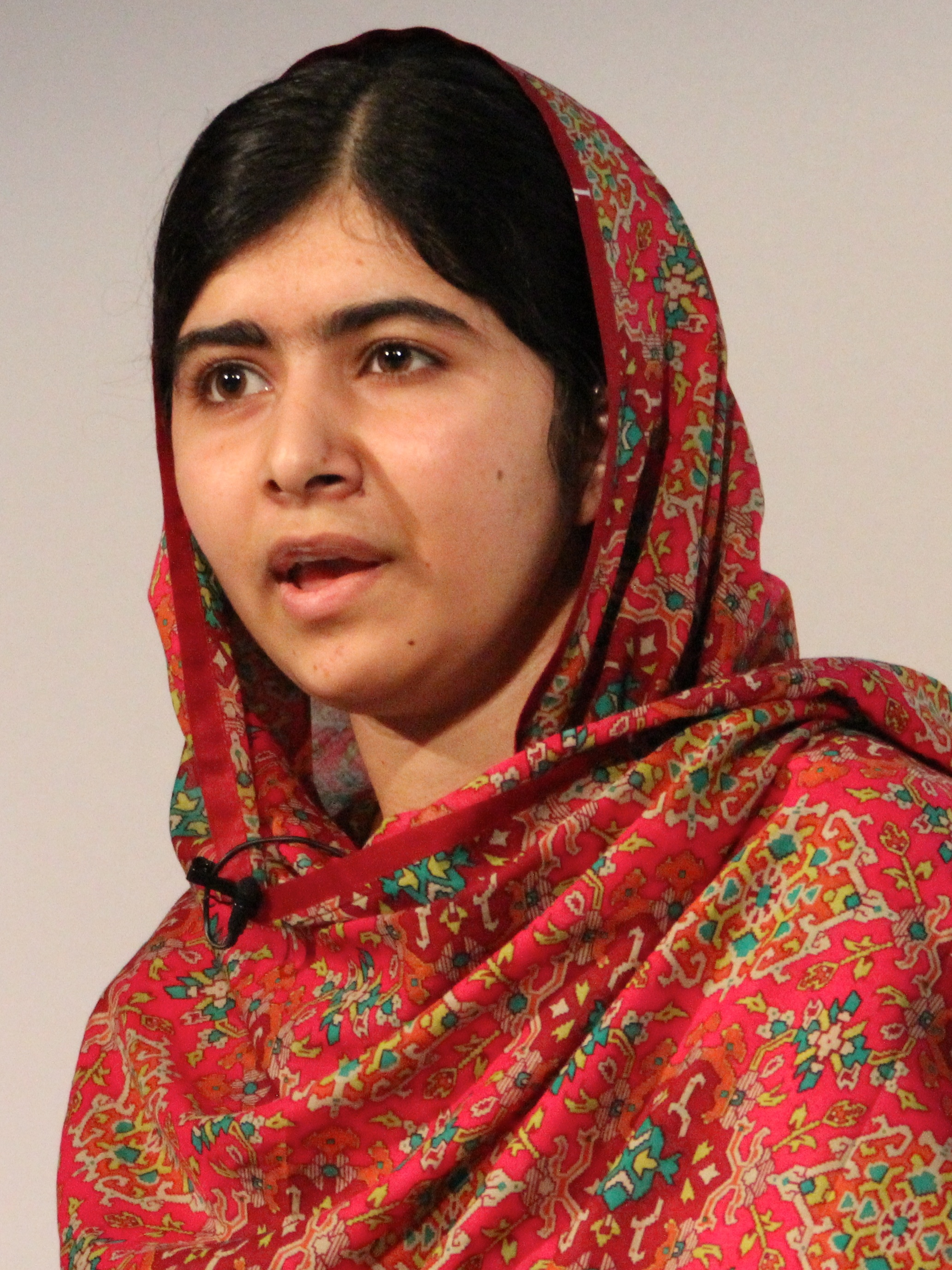
Joint recipients of the 2014 Nobel Peace Prize, Kailash Satyarthi (left) and Malala Yousafzai (right)

=== January ===
- 1 January – Buskerud and Vestfold University College established as a merge between Buskerud University College and Vestfold University College
- 19 January – a fire in Lærdalsøyri destroyed forty buildings, including six protected buildings near Gamleøyri.

=== March ===
- 28 March – Jens Stoltenberg is named next Secretary General of NATO, assuming the position in October 2014.

=== July ===
- 1 July-1 September – Schoolteacher strike.

=== October ===
- 10 October – The 2014 Nobel Peace Prize, presented by the Norwegian Nobel Committee, is shared between Kailash Satyarthi and Malala Yousafzai
- 14 October – Storting extends military service to women, making Norway the first European or NATO country to have conscription extended to both genders in peacetime.
- 17 October – State-owned real estate company Entra Eiendom is privatized and listed on the Oslo Stock Exchange.

== Popular culture ==
=== Music ===
- 11–13 April – Vossajazz
- 6–10 May – Norway participated at the Eurovision Song Contest 2014 with the song "Silent Storm", performed by Carl Espen.
- 2–5 July – Kongsberg Jazzfestival
- 14–19 July – Moldejazz

=== Sports ===
- 7–23 February – at the 2014 Winter Olympics in Sochi, Russia, Norway won a total of 26 Olympic medals including eleven gold medals.
- 23 November – The 2014 Norwegian Football Cup Final was won by Molde FK.
- 7–21 December – at the 2014 European Women's Handball Championship, Norway won their sixth title after beating Spain 28–25 in the final.

=== Chess ===
- 2–13 June – Norway Chess 2014.
- 1–14 August – the 41st Chess Olympiad, organised by the Fédération Internationale des Échecs (FIDE), took place in Tromsø.
- 7–28 November – Magnus Carlsen defended his World Championship title in a match against Viswanathan Anand.

=== Film ===
- 10 January – release of the drama film Kule kidz gråter ikke, directed by Katarina Launing.
- 21 February – the action film In Order of Disappearance, directed by Hans Petter Moland, was released in Norway. The film premiered on 10 February at the 64th Berlin International Film Festival.
- 26 February – the drama film Blind, written and directed by Eskil Vogt, was released in Norway. The film was earlier screened at the 2014 Sundance Film Festival (World Cinema Screenwriting Award), and at the 64th Berlin International Film Festival (awarded the Europa Cinemas Label).

=== Literature ===
- The novella Kveldsvævd by Jon Fosse is published. In 2015, Fosse was awarded the Nordic Council Literature Prize, for Andvake (2007), Olavs draumar (2012) and Kveldsvævd.

== Anniversaries ==
=== Bicentennial anniversary of the Constitution ===
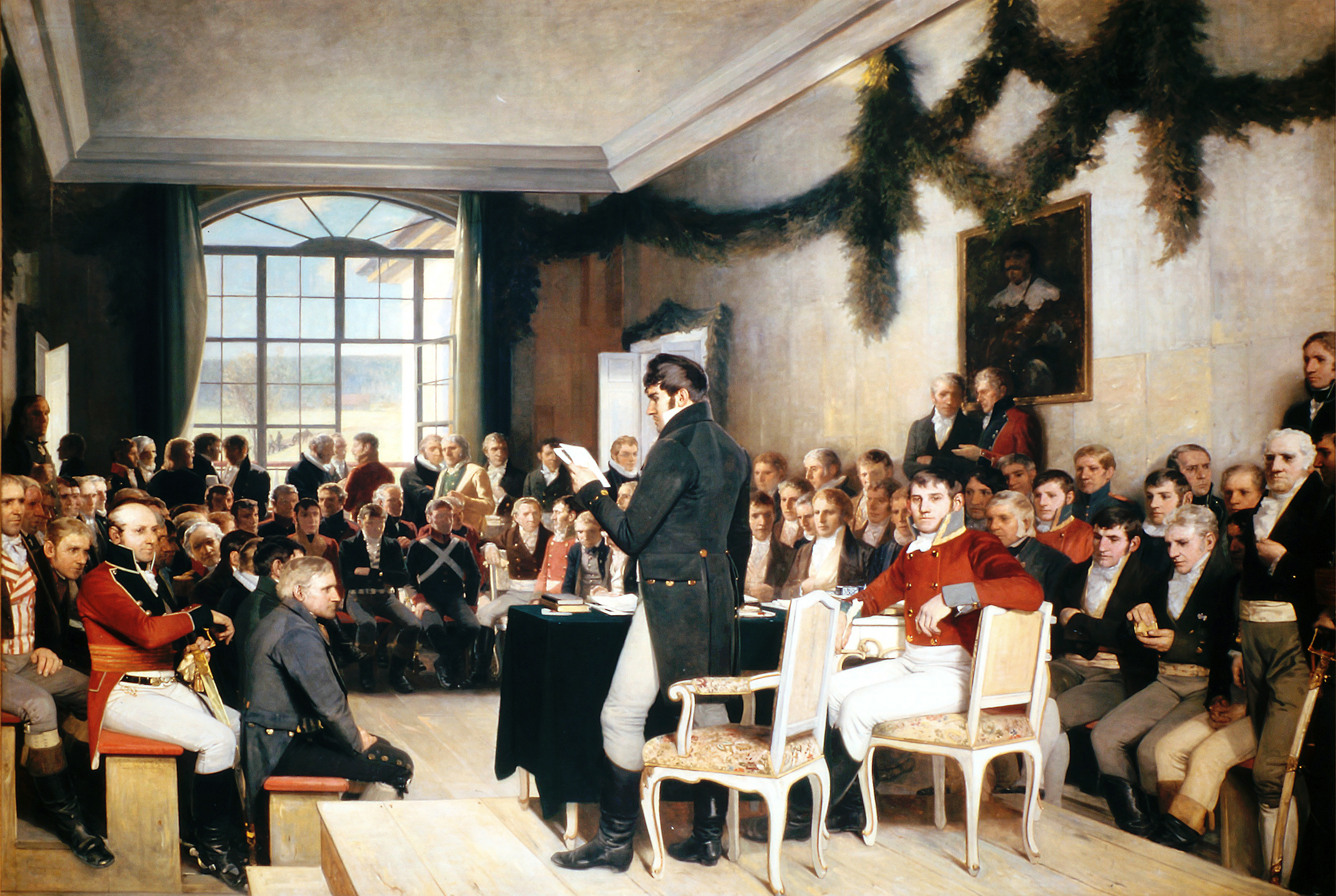
The Constituent Assembly at Eidsvoll in 1814.

- 14 January – 200 years since the Treaty of Kiel.
- 16 February – 200 years since the Meeting of Notables.
- 2 March – 200 years since the establishment of the Ministry of Finance (then: the 1st Ministry) and the Ministry of Justice and Emergency Planning (then: the 2nd Ministry)
- 10 April – 200 years since the convention of the Norwegian Constituent Assembly.
- 17 May – 200 years since the signing of the Constitution of Norway.
- 26 July – 200 years since the outbreak of the Swedish–Norwegian War (1814).
- 14 August – 200 years since the Convention of Moss, which ended the Swedish–Norwegian War.
- 10 October – 200 years since the abdication of King Christian Frederik, in the wake of the Swedish–Norwegian War.
- 4 November – 200 years since the signing of the Constitution of Norway, amended to accommodate a Union between Sweden and Norway.
- 30 November – 200 years since the establishment of the Ministry of Education and Research (then: the 1st Ministry) and Ministry of Defence (then: the 6th Ministry)

=== Other ===
- 18 February – 100 years since the foundation of the Norwegian Society for the Conservation of Nature.
- 23 July – 100 years since the birth of Alf Prøysen.
- 14 August – 200 years since the birth of National Romanticism painter Adolph Tidemand.
- 100 years since the foundation of the Norwegian Museum of Science and Technology.
- 100 years since the 1914 Jubilee Exhibition.

== Notable deaths ==
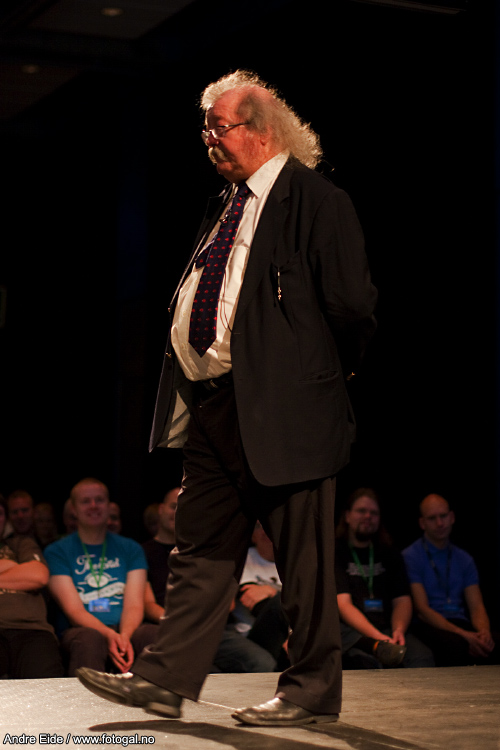
Jon Bing, science fiction writer and jurist.

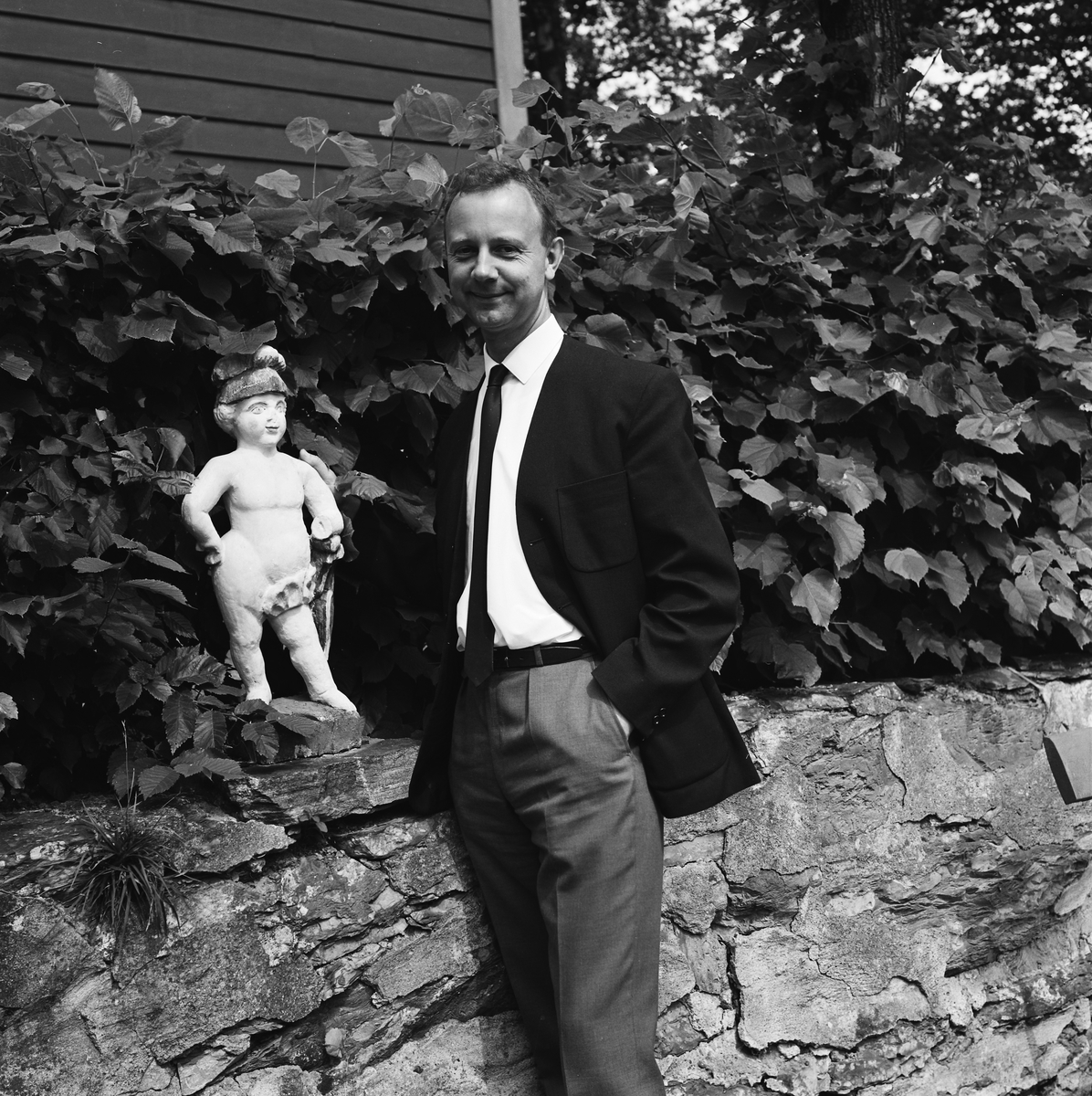
Carsten Hopstock, curator and historian.

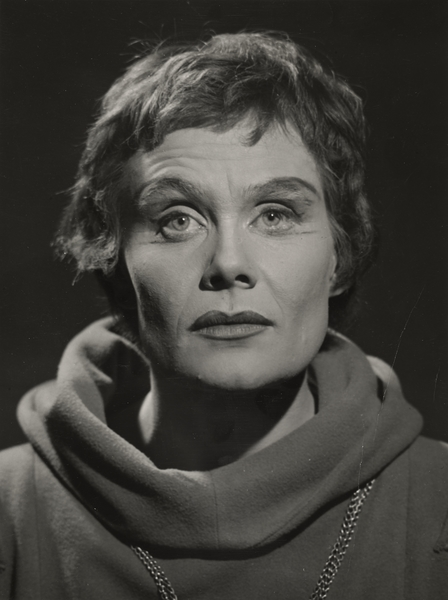
Liv Dommersnes as "Jeanne d'Arc" in 1954.

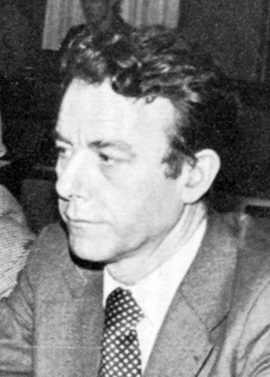
Reiulf Steen in 1979, chairman of the Norwegian Labour Party.

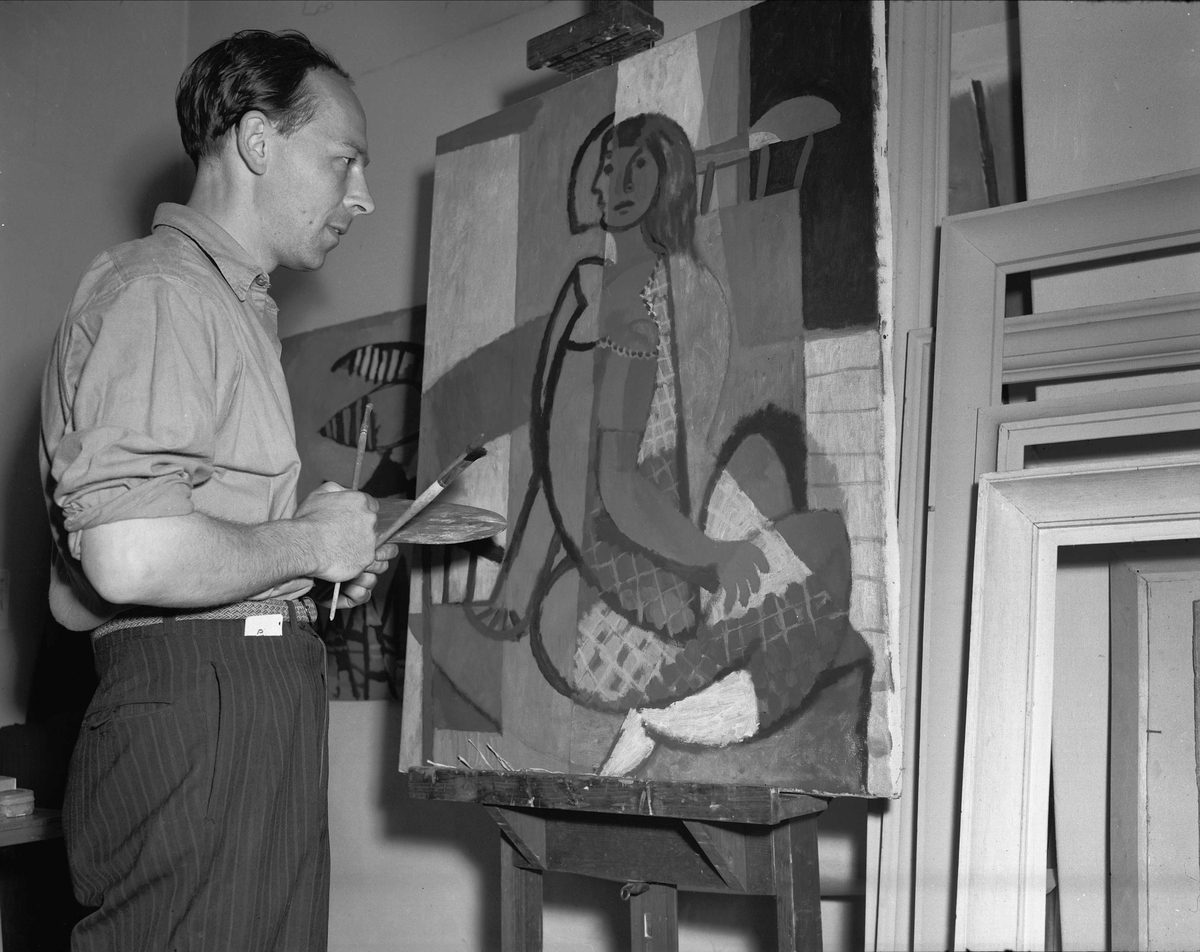
Thore Heramb in 1949.

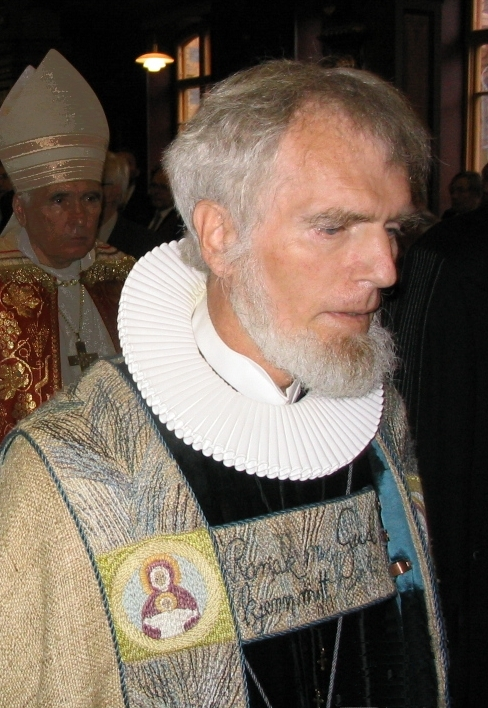
Børre Knudsen, priest and activist.

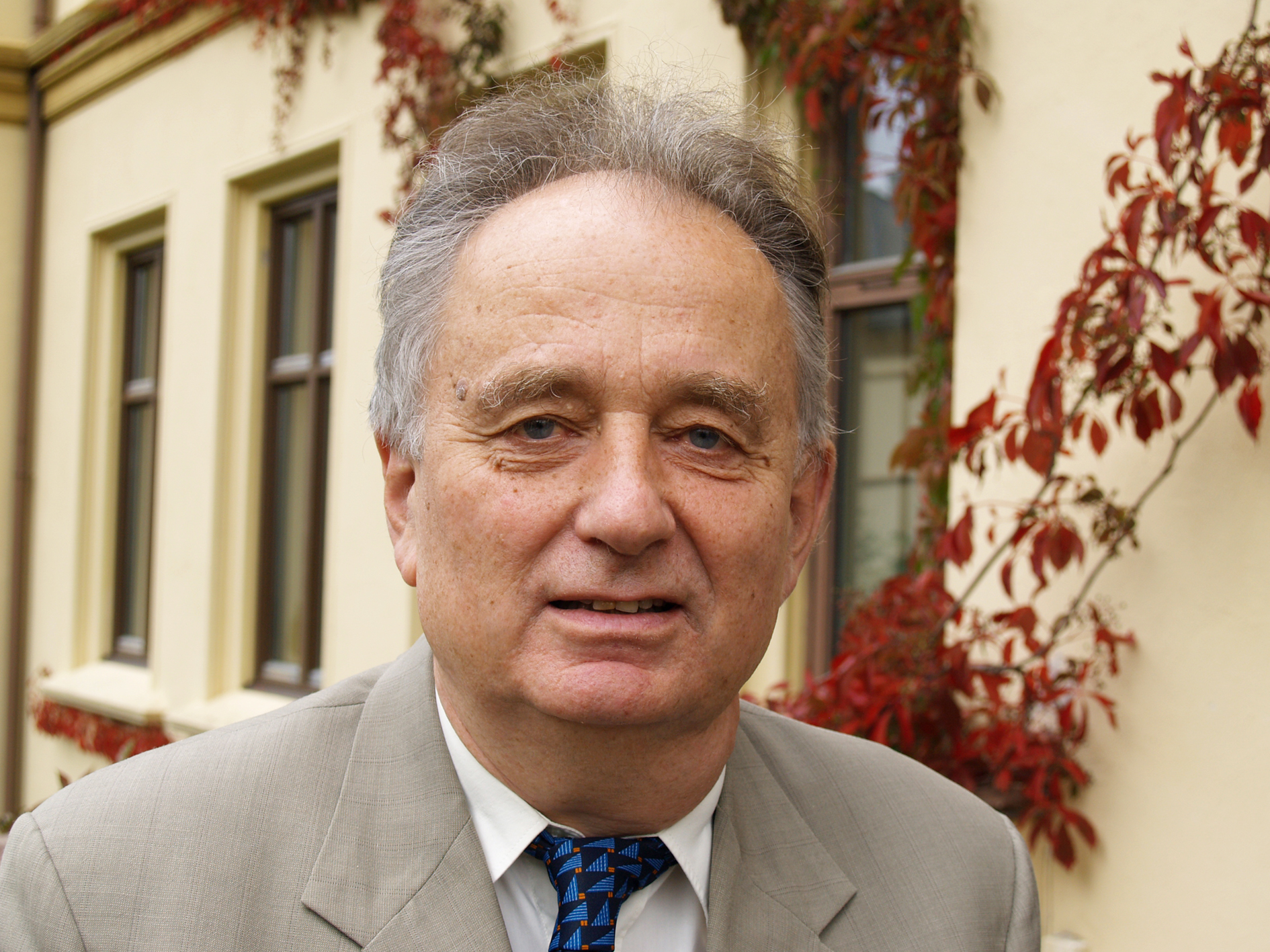
Odd Bondevik, Bishop of the Diocese of Møre.

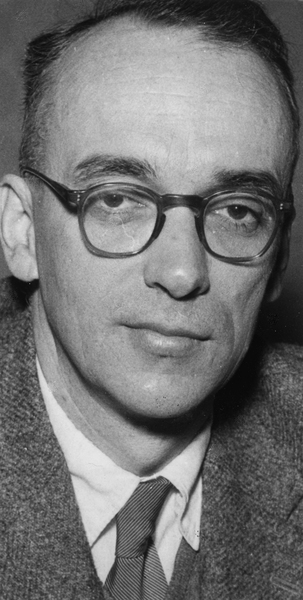
Finn Lied, researcher and politician.

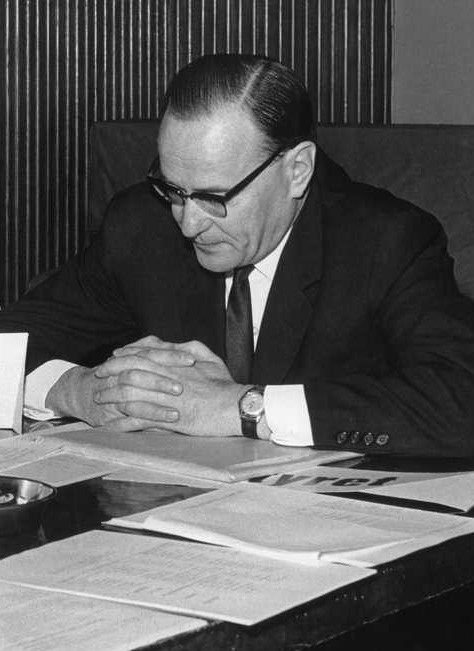
Erik Sture Larre died at the age of 100.

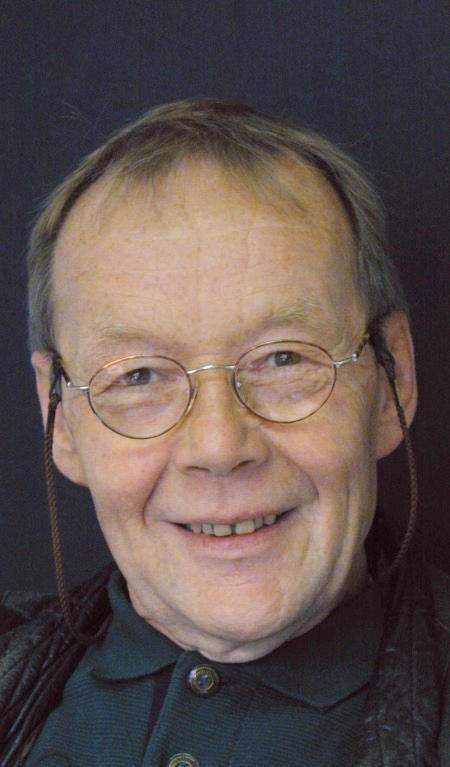
John Persen, Sami composer.

- 5 January – Sissel Sellæg, actress (b. 1928)
- 6 January – Thor Hilmersen, rock guitarist (b. 1946)
- 7 January – Alf Kvasbø, writer (b. 1928)
- 9 January – Hans Lund-Andersen, engineer (b. 1921)
- 12 January – Erik Nord, civil servant (b. 1925)
- 13 January – Robert Heetmøller, painter (b. 1950)
- 13 January – Guri Lysell, dancer (b. 1930)
- 14 January – Ole Moe, newspaper editor (b. 1918)
- 14 January – Jon Bing, author and jurist (b. 1944)
- 15 January – Per Eirik Johansen, music manager (b. 1959)
- 15 January – Tor Milde, journalist and writer (b. 1953)
- 15 January – Aage Teigen, jazz trombonist (b. 1944)
- 17 January – Niels Lauritz Dahl, diplomat (b. 1925)
- 17 January – Rønnaug Eliassen, women's rights activist (b. 1911)
- 21 January – Roar Woldum, swimmer (b. 1933)
- 21 January – Anbjørg Sætre Håtun, television presenter (b. 1972)
- 23 January – Ivar Moe, politician (b. 1922)
- 24 January – Lars Andreas Larssen, actor (b. 1935)
- 24 January – Knut Aukland, physiologist (b. 1935)
- 24 January – Maren-Sofie Røstvig, literary historian (b. 1920)
- 31 January – Carsten Hopstock, curator (b. 1924)
- 31 January – Hans Methlie Michelsen, jurist (born 1920)
- 31 January - Lillen Vogt, graphic artist (b. 1918)
- 1 February – Einar Slyngstad, news anchor (b. 1938)
- 2 February – Karl Erik Bøhn, handball coach (b. 1965)
- 3 February – Pål Skjønberg, actor (b. 1919)
- 3 February – Bjarne Sløgedal, composer (b. 1927)
- 5 February – Tom Sandberg, photographer (b. 1953)
- 7 February – Terje Bergstad, artist (b. 1938)
- 9 February – Sverre Solberg, actor (b. 1959)
- 9 February – Harald Øveraas, trade unionist (b. 1927)
- 16 February – Mansour Koushan, Iranian novelist, poet and playwright (b. 1948).
- 24 February – Eilert Eilertsen, physician and politician (b. 1918)
- 27 February – Arnstein Øverkil, police chief and civil servant (b. 1937)
- 28 February – Juul Bjerke, economist (b. 1928)
- 2 March – Jacob Jervell, theologian (b. 1925)
- 5 March – Wenche Fossen, book publisher and politician (b. 1946)
- 6 March – Bjørn Bryn, television maker (b. 1930)
- 6 March – Viking Olver Eriksen, nuclear physicist (b. 1922)
- 7 March – Jan Sagvaag, footballer (b. 1926)
- 11 March – Brett Borgen, writer (b. 1934)
- 12 March – Kjell Nupen, painter (b. 1955)
- 13 March – Jan Erik Düring, film director (b. 1926)
- 18 March – Leon Bodd, lawyer and politician (b. 1924)
- 18 March – Terje Gruer, Paralympic champion (b. 1955)
- 22 March – Thor Listau, politician (b. 1938)
- 24 March – Arne Løvlie, zoologist (b. 1931)
- 27 March – Per Lillo-Stenberg, actor (b. 1928)
- 27 March – Erna Mundal Pedersen, politician (b. 1929)
- 1 April – Andreas Bjørkum, philologist (b. 1932)
- 3 April – Edvard Grimstad, politician (b. 1933)
- 5 April – Rolv Enge, resistance member (b. 1921)
- 5 April – Leif Haanes, ship-owner (b. 1932)
- 6 April – Liv Dommersnes, actress (b. 1922)
- 8 April – Viggo Jan Olsen, fishers' leader (b. 1937)
- 12 April – Øystein Øystå, writer (b. 1934)
- 14 April – Thorleif Holth, politician (b. 1931)
- 16 April – Gunilla Hegfeldt, painter (b. 1915)
- 18 April – Trygve Lange-Nielsen, judge (b. 1921)
- 24 April – Rolf Johan Lenschow, engineer and rector (b. 1928)
- 26 April – Ole Enger, child actor and businessperson (b. 1948)
- 30 April – Odd Langmoen, industrialist (b. 1919)
- 1 May – Bjørn Barth, diplomat (b. 1931)
- 3 May – Trine Krogh, swimmer (born 1955).
- 5 May – Sven Sønsteby, illustrator (b. 1933)
- 8 May – Jens Christian Hansen, geographer (b. 1932)
- 8 May – Rita Haugerud, politician (b. 1919)
- 11 May – Kaare Kroppan, actor (b. 1933)
- 12 May – Daud Mirza, actor (b. 1969)
- 18 May – Per Rollum, alpine skier (b. 1928)
- 18 May – Per Almar Aas, politician (b. 1929)
- 23 May – Per Gunnar Jensen, pop singer (b. 1928)
- 22 May – Leif Aagaard, resistance member (b. 1920)
- 24 May – Jan P. Jansen, news anchor (b. 1929)
- 27 May – Sigmund Kvaløy Setreng, philosopher (b. 1934)
- 27 May – Alf Ramsøy, actor and runner (b. 1924)
- 27 May – Dagfinn Aarskog, pediatrician (b. 1928)
- 31 May – Jon Sandsmark, textile artist (b. 1941)
- 5 June – Reiulf Steen, politician (b. 1933)
- 8 June – Eva Kløvstad, resistance member (b. 1921)
- 8 June – Hans Kristian Eriksen, writer and editor (b. 1933)
- 8 June – Jan Deberitz, novelist (b. 1950)
- 9 June – Marit Svarva Henriksen, politician (b. 1925)
- 10 June – Peder I. Ramsrud, politician (b. 1923)
- 16 June – Thore Heramb, painter (b. 1916)
- 25 June – Arvid Jacobsen, newspaper editor (b. 1938)
- 25 June – Ragnhild Hilt, actress (b. 1945)
- 25 June – Audvar Os, jurist (b. 1920)
- 3 July – Bjørn Bruland, naval officer (b. 1926)
- 4 July – Torill Thorstad Hauger, author (b. 1943)
- 4 July – Otto Nes, media executive (b. 1920)
- 5 July – Jan Wiese, author (b. 1928)
- 17 July – Bjørn Johan Landmark, astrophysicist (b. 1927)
- 18 July – Sjur Olsnes, professor of medicine (b. 1939)
- 21 July – Harald Hove, politician (b. 1949)
- 21 July – Liv Holtskog, poet (b. 1934)
- 25 July – Thor-Eirik Gulbrandsen Mykland, politician (b. 1940)
- 28 July – Hans I. Kleven, Marxist theorist and politician (b. 1928)
- 29 July – Nini Stoltenberg, activist (b. 1963)
- 30 July – Finn Gundersen, footballer (b. 1933)
- 1 August – Jan Roar Leikvoll, novelist (b. 1974)
- 4 August – Svein-Inge Thime, football referee (b. 1940)
- 9 August – Alex Scherpf, theatre instructor (b. 1955)
- 14 August – Ada Haug Grythe, broadcaster (b. 1934)
- 16 August – Trond Schea, rally driver (b. 1930)
- 17 August – Børre Knudsen, priest and anti-abortion activist (b. 1937)
- 18 August – Per Engebretsen, civil servant (b. 1946)
- 19 August – Kåre Kolberg, composer (b. 1936)
- 23 August – Inga Juuso, yoik artist (b. 1945)
- 25 August – Hildur Krog, botanist (b. 1922)
- 27 August – Jan Groth, musician (b. 1946)
- 27 August – Rolf S. Thorsen, politician (b. 1934)
- 27 August – Bjørn Jervås, musician (b. 1962)
- 29 August – Rolf Kahrs Baardvik, resistance member (b. 1919)
- 6 September – Odd Bondevik, bishop (b. 1941)
- 6 September – Arne Amundsen, footballer (b. 1952)
- 10 September – Hans Petter Tholfsen, harness racer (b. 1946)
- 12 September – Bjørn Tore Bryn, news anchor (b. 1936)
- 16 September – Alf Ivar Samuelsen, politician (b. 1942)
- 21 September – Ole Wiig, politician (b. 1923)
- 24 September – Ailo Gaup, author and shaman (b. 1944)
- 26 September – Astrid Dirdal Hegrestad, politician (b. 1929)
- 28 September – Lisbeth Bodd, theatre leader (b. 1958)
- 4 October – Olav Lund, politician (b. 1942)
- 5 October – Vivi Haug, entertainer (b. 1936)
- 10 October – Olav Dale, jazz saxophonist (b. 1955)
- 10 October – Finn Lied, politician and research director (b. 1916)
- 14 October – Kjell Østrem, diplomat (b. 1932)
- 17 October – Jon Ramstad, politician (b. 1925)
- 22 October – Almar Heggen, opera singer (b. 1933)
- 24 October – Arne Fuglum, port director (b. 1933)
- 27 October – Reidar Sundby, footballer (b. 1926)
- 27 October – Kåre Langvik-Johannessen, germanist (b. 1919)
- 30 October – Grethe Werner, sportswoman (born 1928).
- 1 November – Edin Løvås, pastor (b. 1920)
- 4 November – Annæus Schjødt, Jr., jurist (b. 1920)
- 4 November – Kristine Bernadotte, royal (b. 1932)
- 5 November – Frantz Johansen, philanthropist and missionary (b. 1920)
- 7 November – Torbjørn Sikkeland, physicist (b. 1923)
- 8 November – Rolf Ramm Østgaard, architect (b. 1923)
- 9 November – Rolf Ramm Østgaard, architect (b. 1923)
- 9 November – Jens Bugge, Supreme Court justice (b. 1930)
- 11 November – Erik Sture Larre, lawyer and resistance member (b. 1914)
- 14 November – Kjell Hvidsand, footballer (b. 1941)
- 15 November – Emanuel Minos, Pentecostal (b. 1925)
- 16 November – Torunn Borge, poet (b. 1960)
- 17 November – Jan Thomas Njerve, painter (b. 1927)
- 20 November – Gisle Johnson, scouting leader (b. 1934)
- 21 November – Jorolf Alstad, chemist (b. 1927)
- 21 November – Leif Andersen, competition rower (b. 1936).
- 22 November – Andreas Lønning, engineer (b. 1929)
- 24 November – Otto Hageberg, literary researcher (b. 1936)
- 27 November – Arne Serck-Hanssen, rower (b. 1925)
- 27 November – Annine Qvale, children's writer (b. 1963)
- 30 November – Mari Bjørgan, actor and revue artist (b. 1950)
- 4 December – Hroar Elvenes, speed skater (b. 1932)
- 8 December – Knut Nystedt, composer (b. 1915)
- 9 December – Gerd Kirste, politician (b. 1918)
- 9 December – Frank Beck, motivator (b. 1927)
- 12 December – John Persen, composer (b. 1941)
- 16 December – Reidar Dørum, footballer (b. 1925)
- 17 December – Jarle Ofstad, physician (b. 1927)
- 18 December – Otto Johan Hennig-Olsen, businessperson (b. 1927)
- 23 December – Johnny Bergh, TV producer (b. 1934)
- 24 December – Reidar Floeng, politician (b. 1918)
- 25 December – Kjell Hanssen, editor and politician (b. 1932)
- 25 December – Alf Næsheim, illustrator (b. 1925)
- 29 December – Odd Iversen, footballer (b. 1945)
- 29 December – Ulf Sand, politician (b. 1938)
- 29 December – Eldrid Straume, archaeologist (b. 1929)

== See also ==
- 2014 in Norwegian music
