= 1941 in Norway =

- Centuries: 18th; 19th; 20th; 21st
- Decades: 1920s; 1930s; 1940s; 1950s; 1960s
- See also: List of years in Norway

Events in the year 1941 in Norway.

== Incumbents ==
- Government in Exile (in London)
  - Monarch – Haakon VII.
  - Prime Minister – Johan Nygaardsvold (Labour Party)
- German Military Governor
  - Reichskommissar in Norway – Josef Terboven

== Events ==
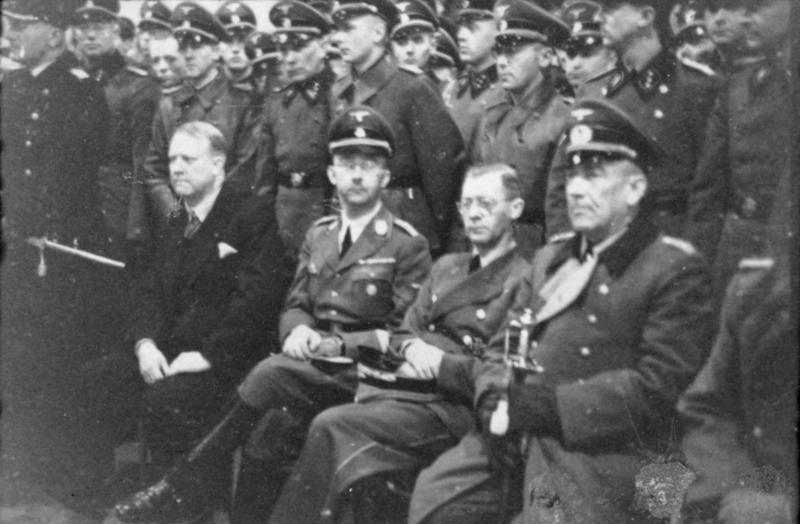
Heinrich Himmler visited Norway in 1941. Seated (from left to right) are Quisling, Himmler, Josef Terboven, the Nazi gauleiter who was the effective ruler of Norway during the occupation, and General Nikolaus von Falkenhorst, the commander of the German forces in Norway.

- 4 March – British Commandos carry out a successful raid on the Lofoten Islands.
- 21 May – A theatre strike starts in Oslo, spreading to Bergen and Trondheim from the next day, and lasts for five weeks.
- 27 December – British Commandos raid the port of Måløy on Vågsøy island, causing Hitler to reinforce the garrison and defenses, drawing vital troops away from other areas.
- Friheten, a weekly newspaper published by the Norwegian Communist Party, is founded illegally.

== Sports ==
In 1941, organized sport in Norway was heavily affected by the German occupation. Following attempts by the occupation authorities to place Norwegian sport under Nazi control, athletes and sports clubs across the country participated in a nationwide boycott known as idrettsfronten (“the sports front”). As a result, most organized sporting activity ceased, and many athletes refused to take part in competitions sanctioned by the occupation regime.

Some sporting events organized by the collaborationist authorities were held with little or no public support. A national athletics meet arranged by NS Sports at Bislett Stadium was conducted in front of empty stands, reflecting the widespread boycott of occupation-controlled sport.

=== Literature ===
- Thorbjørn Egner – Truls og Kari: en liten bok for store og små

== Notable births ==
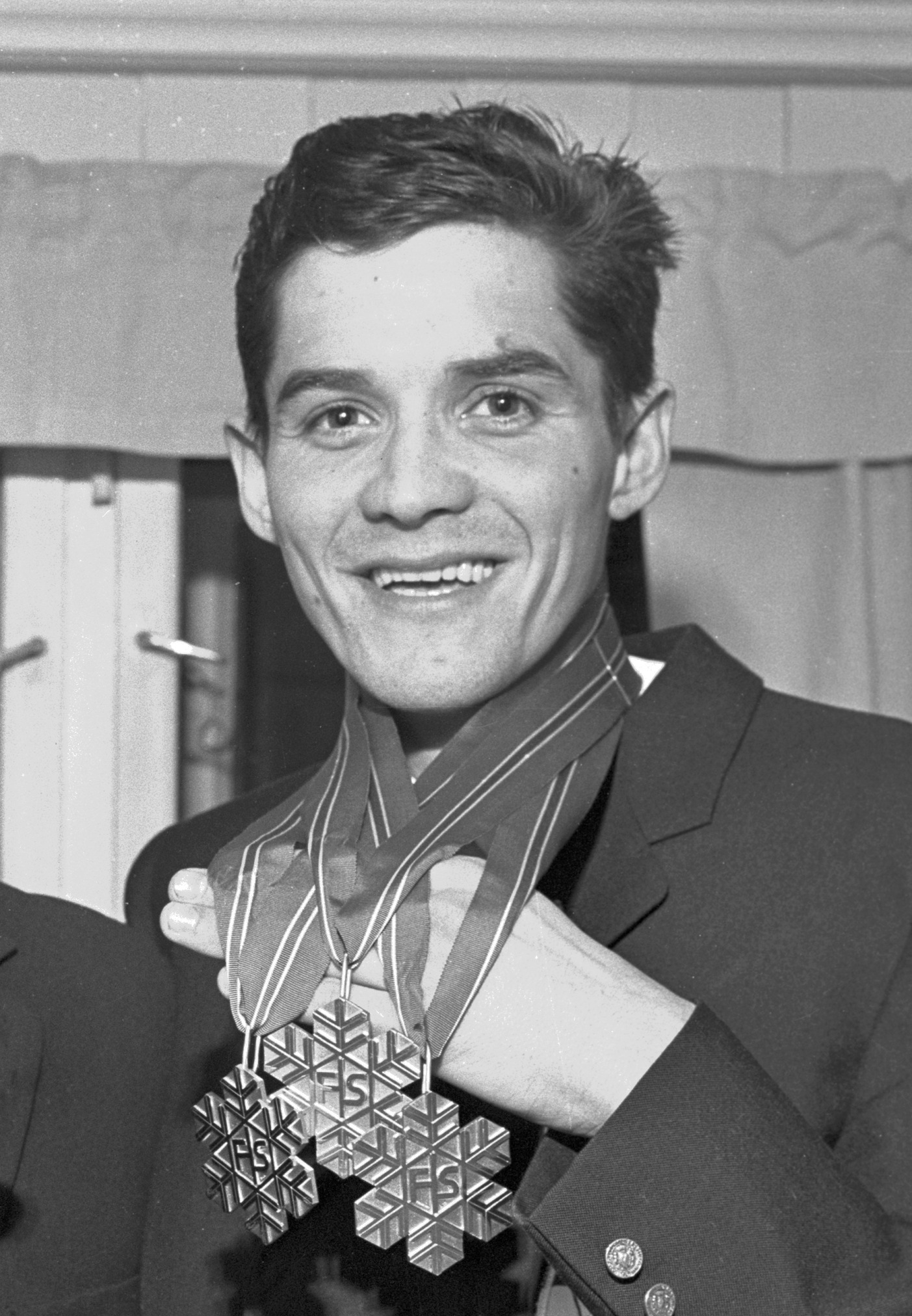
Gjermund Eggen

- 5 January – Kjell Almskog, businessperson
- 12 January – John Bjørnebye, diplomat
- 29 January – Leif Måsvær, politician
- 24 February – Kari Onstad, singer and actress
- 8 March – Turid Farbregd, philologist and translator.
- 13 March – Torgeir Garmo, politician
- 17 March – Magnus Stangeland, politician
- 20 March – Atle Kittang, literary researcher and literary critic (died 2013).
- 25 March – Gudmund Hernes, politician and Minister
- 3 April – Erik Mollatt, businessperson
- 8 April – Jan Christiansen, international soccer player and coach
- 9 April – Ivar Lykke, architect
- 17 April – Petter Thomassen, politician and Minister (died 2003)
- 20 April – Åshild Hauan, politician
- 29 April – Kjell Engebretsen, politician
- 1 May – Magne Thomassen, speed skater and Olympic silver medallist
- 13 May
  - Gudbrand Bakken, veterinarian and civil servant (died 2024).
  - Rolf Skår, engineer (died 2023).
  - Tore Torell, magician (died 2018).
- 14 May – Ivar Nordkild, biathlete and World Champion.
- 17 May – Helge Hveem, political scientist and politician
- 25 May – Jan Vincents Johannessen, physician and hospital manager.
- 29 May – Inger Aufles, cross country skier and Olympic gold medallist
- 5 June – Gjermund Eggen, cross country skier and World Champion
- 19 June – Finn Wagle, bishop
- 20 June – Odd Bondevik, bishop
- 21 June – Totto Osvold, Norwegian radio entertainer (died 2023)
- 29 June – Kjell Risvik, translator (died 2021).
- 3 July – Ole Jonny Friise, bandy player, footballer (died 2024).
- 14 July – Asbjørn Andersen, politician (died 1994)
- 16 July – Dag Solstad, novelist, short-story writer, and dramatist (died 2025)
- 22 July – Ole Jørgen Benedictow, historian
- 6 August – Svein Christiansen, jazz drummer (died 2015)
- 12 August – Egil Tynæs, medical doctor, killed in Afghanistan (died 2004)
- 21 August – Andreas Hamnes, politician
- 23 August – Odd Reinsfelt, politician
- 31 August – Knut Faldbakken, novelist
- 17 September – Nils Arne Eggen, international soccer player and manager
- 18 September – Inger-Marie Ytterhorn, politician (died 2021).
- 2 October – Oddbjørn Snøfugl, politician
- 23 October – Magnhild Gravir, children's writer.
- 26 October – Torgeir Brandtzæg, ski jumper and Olympic bronze medallist
- 27 October – Gerd Brantenberg, author, teacher and feminist writer
- 7 November – Lise Skjåk Bræk, textile artist
- 9 November – Harald Berg, international soccer player
- 11 November – Hans J. Røsjorde, politician
- 19 November – Ragna Berget Jørgensen, politician
- 5 December – Håkon Øverby, sport wrestler (died 2021).
- 18 December – Dagfinn Habberstad, trade unionist and civil servant

=== Full date unknown ===
- Gro Pedersen Claussen, ceramic and textile designer
- Jørgen Haugan, author and lecturer
- Carl Høgset, choral conductor
- Steinar Killi, civil servant
- Arne Simonsen, civil servant

== Notable deaths ==
- 9 January (in England) – Ragnar Vik, sailor and Olympic gold medallist (born 1893).
- 24 January – Finn Blakstad, farmer and politician (born 1865)
- 26 January – Anton Ræder, educator and historian (born 1855).
- 1 August – Waldemar Ager, newspaperman and author in America (born 1869)
- 10 September – Viggo Hansteen, lawyer and politician, executed (born 1900)
- 10 September – Rolf Wickstrøm, labour activist, executed (born 1912)
- 15 November – Fredrik Stang, politician and Minister (born 1867)
- 3 December – Christian Sinding, composer (born 1856)
- 27 December – Martin Linge, actor and military commander (born 1894)

=== Full date unknown ===
- Adolf Agthe, architect (born 1863)
- Bernt Holtsmark, politician (born 1859)
- Ole Konrad Ribsskog, politician (born 1886)
