= Bjørnebye =

Bjørnebye is a Norwegian surname. Notable people with the surname include:

- John Bjørnebye (1941–2017), Norwegian diplomat
- Jo Inge Bjørnebye (1946–2013), Norwegian ski jumper
- Stig Inge Bjørnebye (born 1969), Norwegian footballer
