= Eldrid =

Eldrid is a Norwegian feminine given name. Notable people with the given name include:

- Eldrid Erdal (1901–1997), Norwegian politician
- Eldrid Lunden (born 1940), Norwegian poet and professor
- Eldrid Nordbø (1942–2026), Norwegian politician
- Eldrid Straume (1929–2014), Norwegian archaeologist
