= Bjørkum =

Bjørkum is a Norwegian surname. Notable people with the surname include:

- Andreas Bjørkum (1932–2014), Norwegian philologist
- Erik Bjørkum (born 1965), Norwegian sailor
- Olav Bjørkum (1859–1936), Norwegian politician
