= Næsheim =

Næsheim is a Norwegian surname. Notable people with the surname include:

- Alf Næsheim (1926–2014), Norwegian painter and illustrator
- Peder P. Næsheim (1925–1969), Norwegian politician
