= Ivar Lykke =

Ivar Lykke may refer to:

- Ivar Lykke (politician) (1872–1949), Norwegian politician; Prime Minister of Norway, 1926–1928
- Ivar Lykke (footballer) (1889–1955), Danish amateur footballer
- Ivar Lykke (architect) (born 1941), Norwegian architect

== See also ==
- Ivar Lykke Falch Lind (1870–?), Norwegian jurist and politician
