= Jens Hansen =

Jens Hansen may refer to:

- Jens Hoyer Hansen (1940–1999), Danish-born New Zealand jeweller
- Jens Jørgen Hansen (born 1939), Danish former football player and manager
- Jens Kristian Hansen (born 1971), Faroese football player
- Jens Marni Hansen (born 1974), Faroese singer, songwriter, composer and musician
- Jens Peter Hansen (1927–1996), Danish amateur footballer
- Jens Christian Hansen (1932–2014), Norwegian geographer
- Jens Smedegaard Hansen (born 1957), Danish Olympic sprinter
