= Deberitz =

Deberitz is a surname. Notable people with the surname include:

- Jan Deberitz (1950–2014), Norwegian novelist
- Per Deberitz (1880–1945), Norwegian painter
