= Qvale (surname) =

Qvale is a surname. Notable people with the surname include:

- Annine Qvale (1963–2014), Norwegian children's writer and illustrator
- Brent Qvale (born 1991), American footballer
- Brian Qvale (born 1988), American basketball player
- Finn Qvale (1873–1955), Norwegian military officer, cartographer and sports official
- John Qvale (1911–1977), Norwegian police chief and judge
- Kjell Qvale (1919–2013), Norwegian-American business executive
  - Bruce Qvale, son of Kjell and founder of Qvale car company
- Morten Qvale (born 1957), Norwegian photographer
- Per Qvale (born 1946), Norwegian translator
- Per Pedersen Qvale, the namesake of Qvale Island
