= Seimsdalen =

Valley in Årdal Municipality, Norway

- Seimsdal
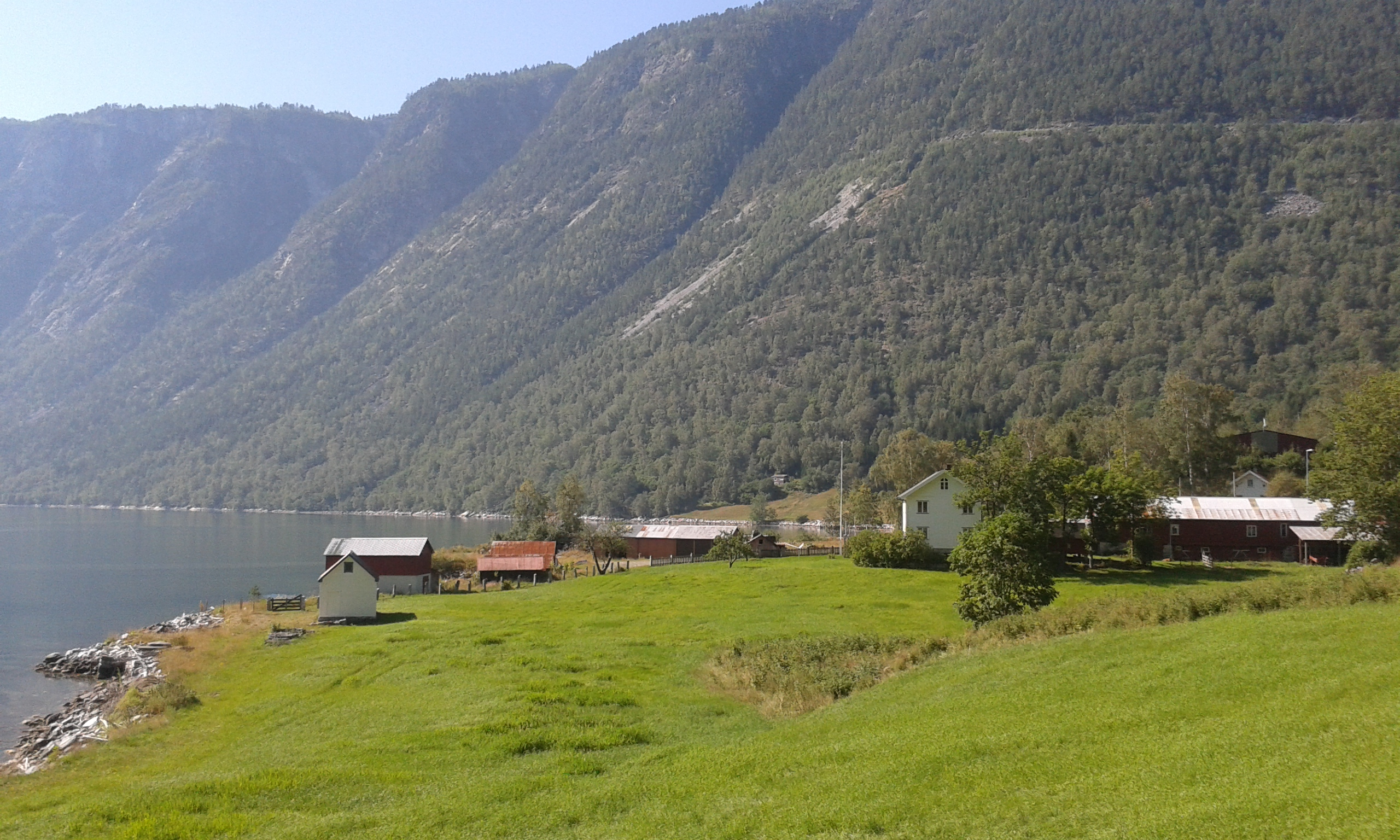
- View of the Seimsdalen valley

Geology
- Type: River valley

Geography
- Location: Vestland, Norway
- Coordinates: 61°14′27″N 07°39′11″E
- Interactive map of Seimsdalen

Seimsdalen is a valley in Årdal Municipality in Vestland county, Norway. The valley is located 3 kilometres (1.9 mi) west of the municipal center of Årdalstangen, to which it is connected via a 1.5 kilometres (0.93 mi) long Seimsdalstunnelen. The village of Indre Offerdal lies about 10 kilometres (6.2 mi) to the southwest. The population of the valley is 467 (2013).

External image
- Aerial view of Seimsdal, Seimsdal Kraft AS, 26 September 2010
