= Oltedal Church =

Church in Rogaland, Norway

- Oltedal kirke
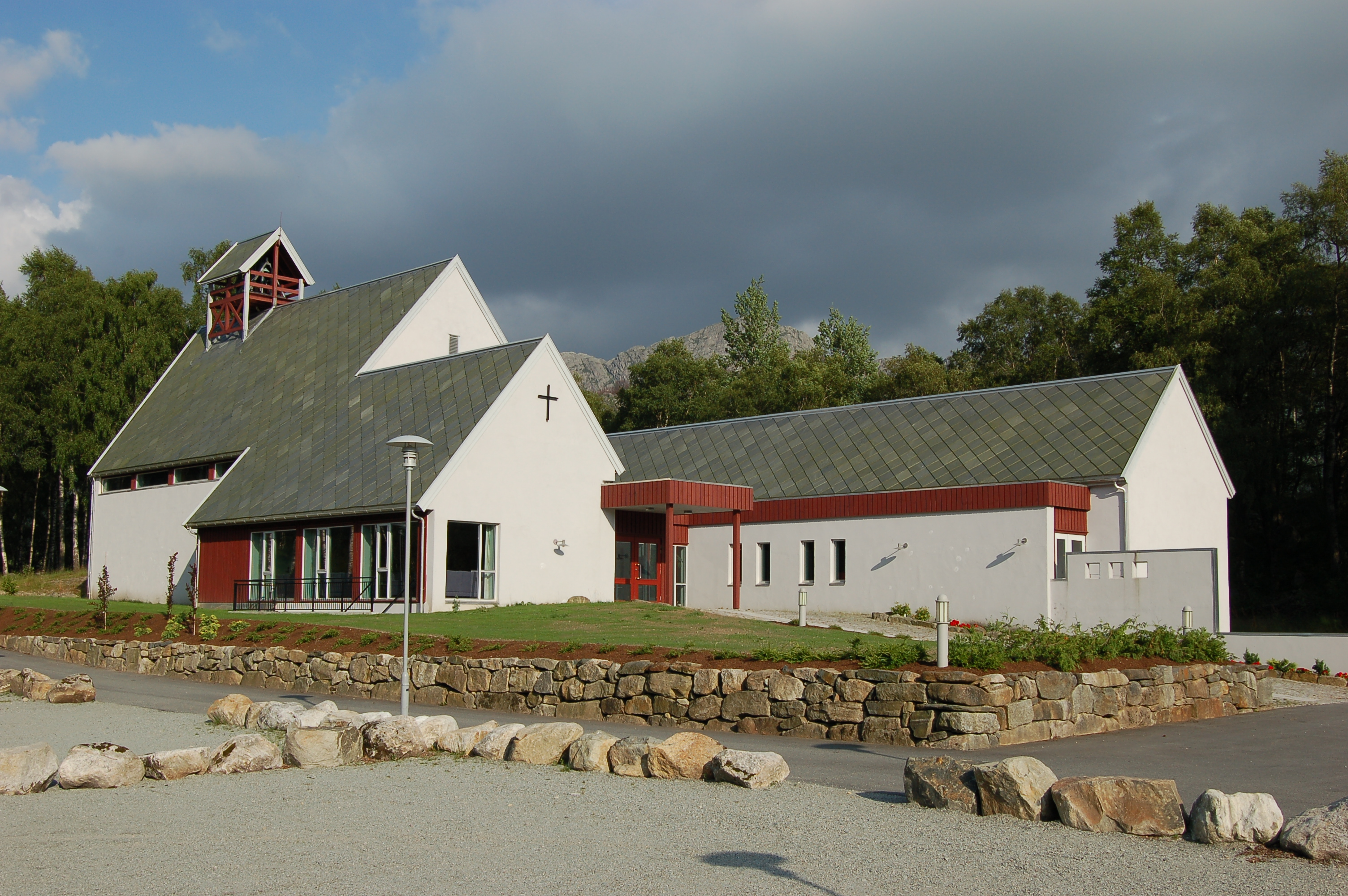
- View of the church
- Oltedal Church
- 58.825599°N 6.031489°E
- Location: Gjesdal Municipality, Rogaland
- Country: Norway
- Denomination: Church of Norway
- Churchmanship: Evangelical Lutheran

History
- Status: Parish church
- Founded: 2002
- Consecrated: 10 Feb 2002

Architecture
- Functional status: Active
- Architect: Olav Urstad
- Architectural type: Rectangular
- Completed: 2002 (24 years ago)

Specifications
- Materials: Concrete

Administration
- Diocese: Stavanger bispedømme
- Deanery: Jæren prosti
- Parish: Gjesdal
- Norwegian Cultural Heritage Site
- Type: Church
- Status: Not protected
- ID: 85214

Oltedal Church (Norwegian: Oltedal kirke) is a parish church of the Church of Norway in Gjesdal Municipality in Rogaland county, Norway. It is located in the village of Oltedal. It is one of the three churches for the Gjesdal parish which is part of the Jæren prosti (deanery) in the Diocese of Stavanger. The white, concrete church was built in a rectangular style in 2002 using designs by the architect Olav Urstad. The church was consecrated on 10 February 2002.

== History ==
In 1926, a small chapel was built in Oltedal. It was designed by Gustav Helland and it was consecrated on 17 October 1926. It was a wooden long church with an asymmetrically placed tower in the northeast. In 1970, the chapel was renovated. By the 1990s, the chapel was too small for the congregation, so in 2002, the chapel was de-consecrated and sold and the present church was constructed about 750 metres (2,460 ft) to the west.

== See also ==
- List of churches in Rogaland
