= Astrid Dirdal Hegrestad =

Norwegian politician

Astrid Dirdal Hegrestad (6 June 1929 – 26 September 2014) was a Norwegian politician for the Centre Party.

She grew up in Oltedal, and from her late teens in Egersund. She served as a deputy representative to the Parliament of Norway from Rogaland during the terms 1969–1973, 1973–1977 and 1977–1981. In total she met during 56 days of parliamentary session. She has chaired Rogaland Agrarian Association, Norges Bondekvinnelag and Statens eldreråd.

She was awarded the King's Medal of Merit in silver in 2003.
