= Årdal Church (Vestland) =

Church in Vestland, Norway

- Årdal kyrkje
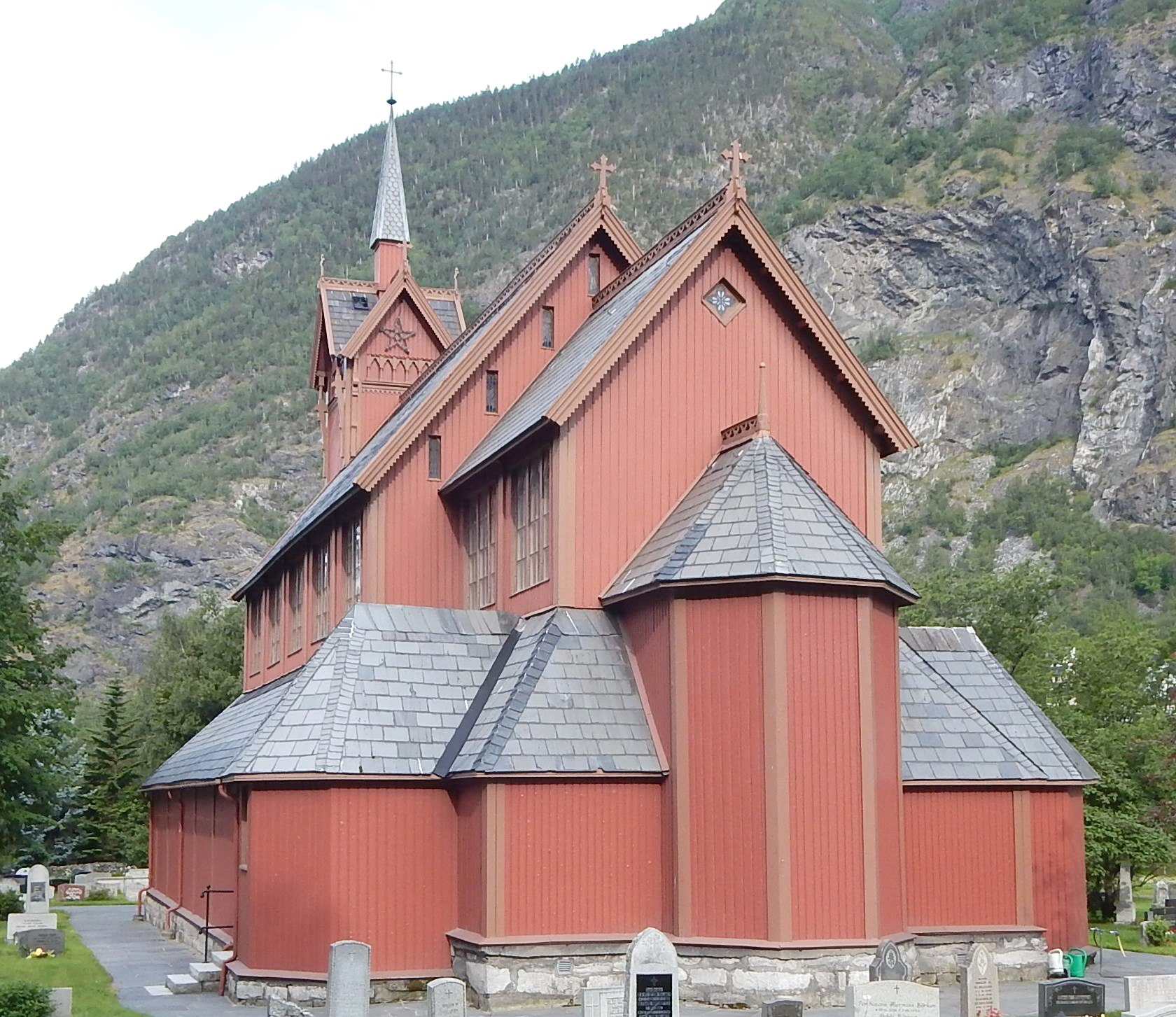
- View of the church
- Årdal Church
- 61°14′17″N 7°42′25″E
- Location: Årdal Municipality, Vestland
- Country: Norway
- Denomination: Church of Norway
- Previous denomination: Catholic Church
- Churchmanship: Evangelical Lutheran

History
- Status: Parish church
- Founded: 12th century
- Consecrated: 19 December 1867

Architecture
- Functional status: Active
- Architect: Christian Christie
- Architectural type: Long church
- Completed: 1867 (159 years ago)

Specifications
- Capacity: 400
- Materials: Wood

Administration
- Diocese: Bjørgvin bispedømme
- Deanery: Sogn prosti
- Parish: Nedre Årdal
- Norwegian Cultural Heritage Site
- Type: Church
- Status: Listed
- ID: 85977

Årdal Church (Norwegian: Årdal kyrkje) is a parish church of the Church of Norway in Årdal Municipality in Vestland county, Norway. It is located in the village of Årdalstangen, at the end of the Årdalsfjorden. It is the church for the Nedre Årdal parish which is part of the Sogn prosti (deanery) in the Diocese of Bjørgvin. The red, wooden church was built in a long church design in 1867 using plans drawn up by the architect Christian Christie. The church seats about 400 people.

== History ==
The earliest existing historical records of the church date back to the year 1322, but the church was not new that year. The first church was a wooden stave church that was likely constructed between 1150 and 1200. The church was located about 4 metres (13 ft) west of the present church. Over the centuries the church was renovated and at some point, both the nave and chancel were expanded. A tower was also built on the west end at some point during the middle ages as well. In the 1800s, the nave measured 16 by 7 metres (52 ft × 23 ft) with a narrower choir measuring 5.4 by 4.8 metres (18 ft × 16 ft).

In 1860s, the church was deemed to be too small for the parish and in major need of repair, so they decided to build a new church. The new church was designed by Christian Christie in the 1860s and it was designed to look like a slightly more modern stave church design. The church was prefabricated in Christiania before the materials were transported to Årdal and built right next to the old stave church, about 4 metres (13 ft) to the east. The new building was consecrated on 19 December 1867 by the local parish priest Lauritz Andreas Hald. After the new church was completed, the old church was torn down. During the demolition of the old church, workers found medieval coins under the church which have helped to date the original construction of the church.

== Media gallery ==
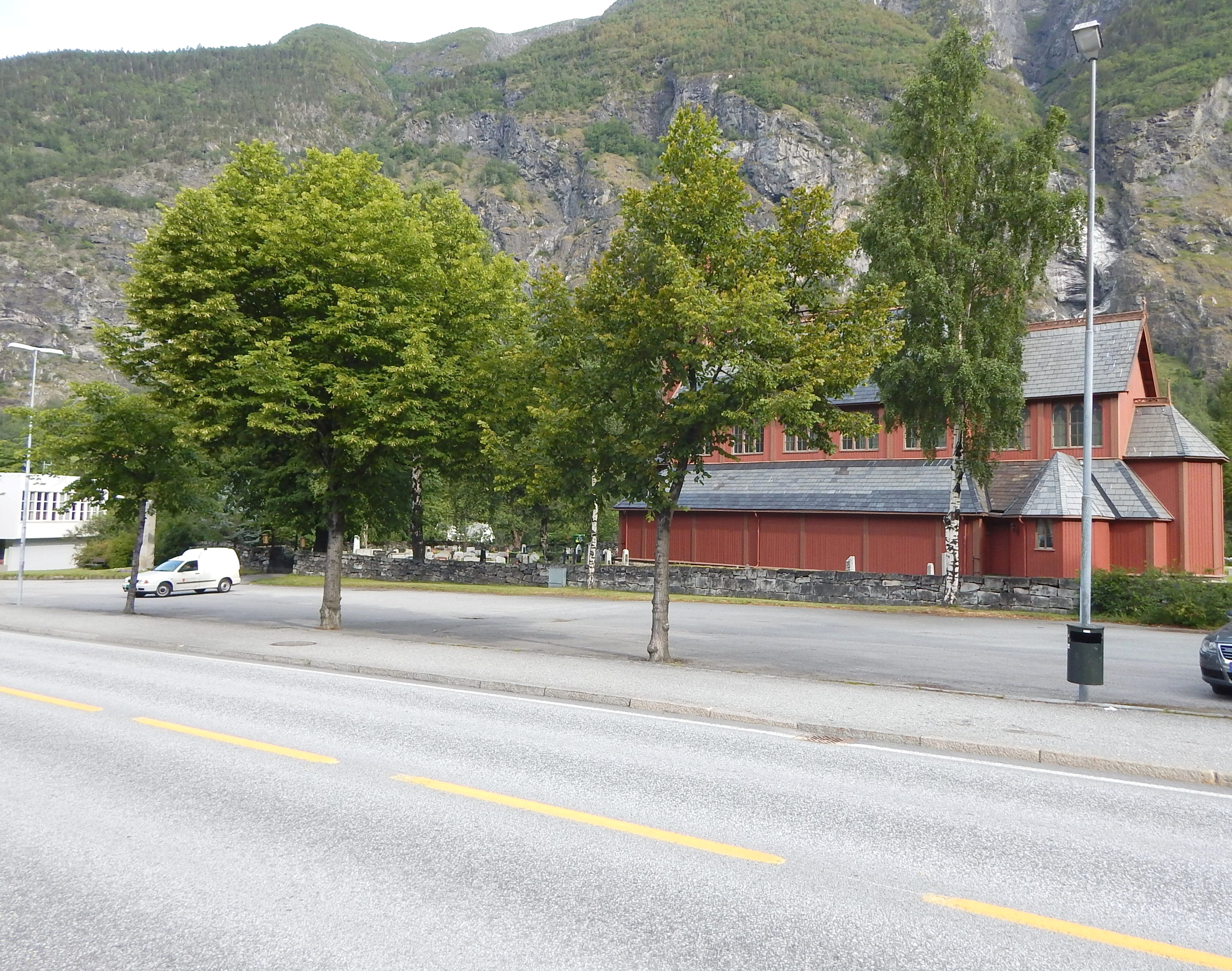
Side view of the present church

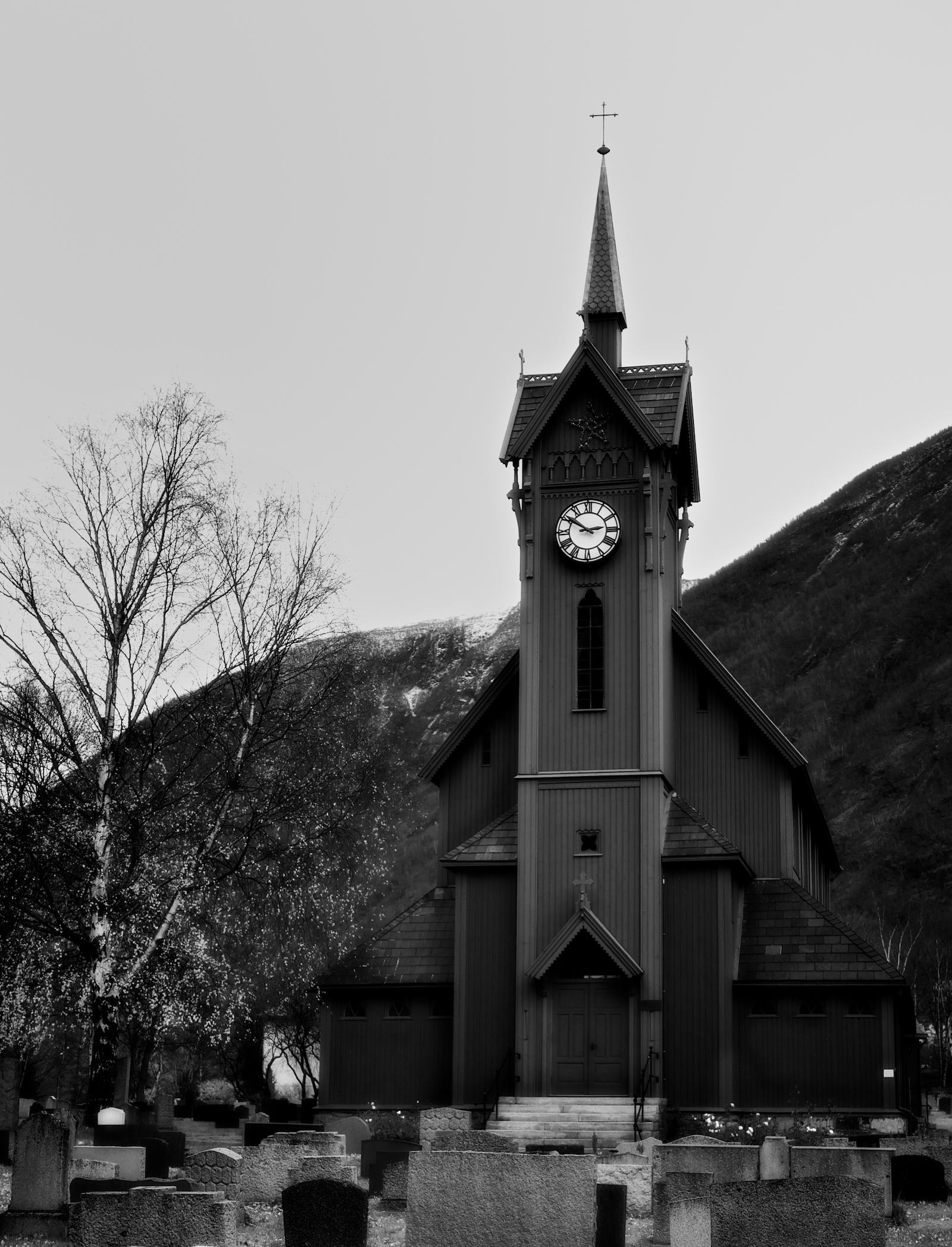
Front view of the present church

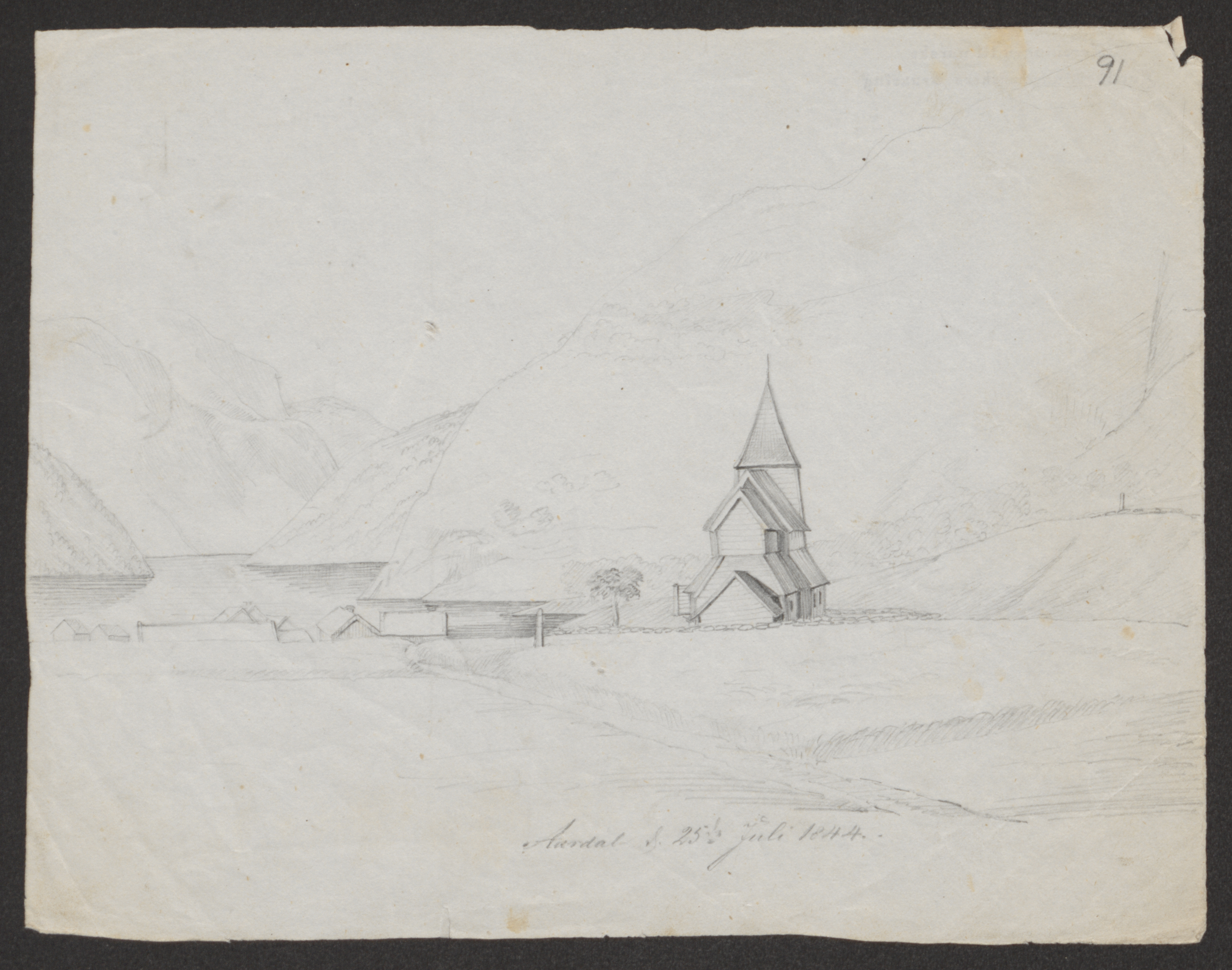
Sketch of the old stave church (1200-1867)

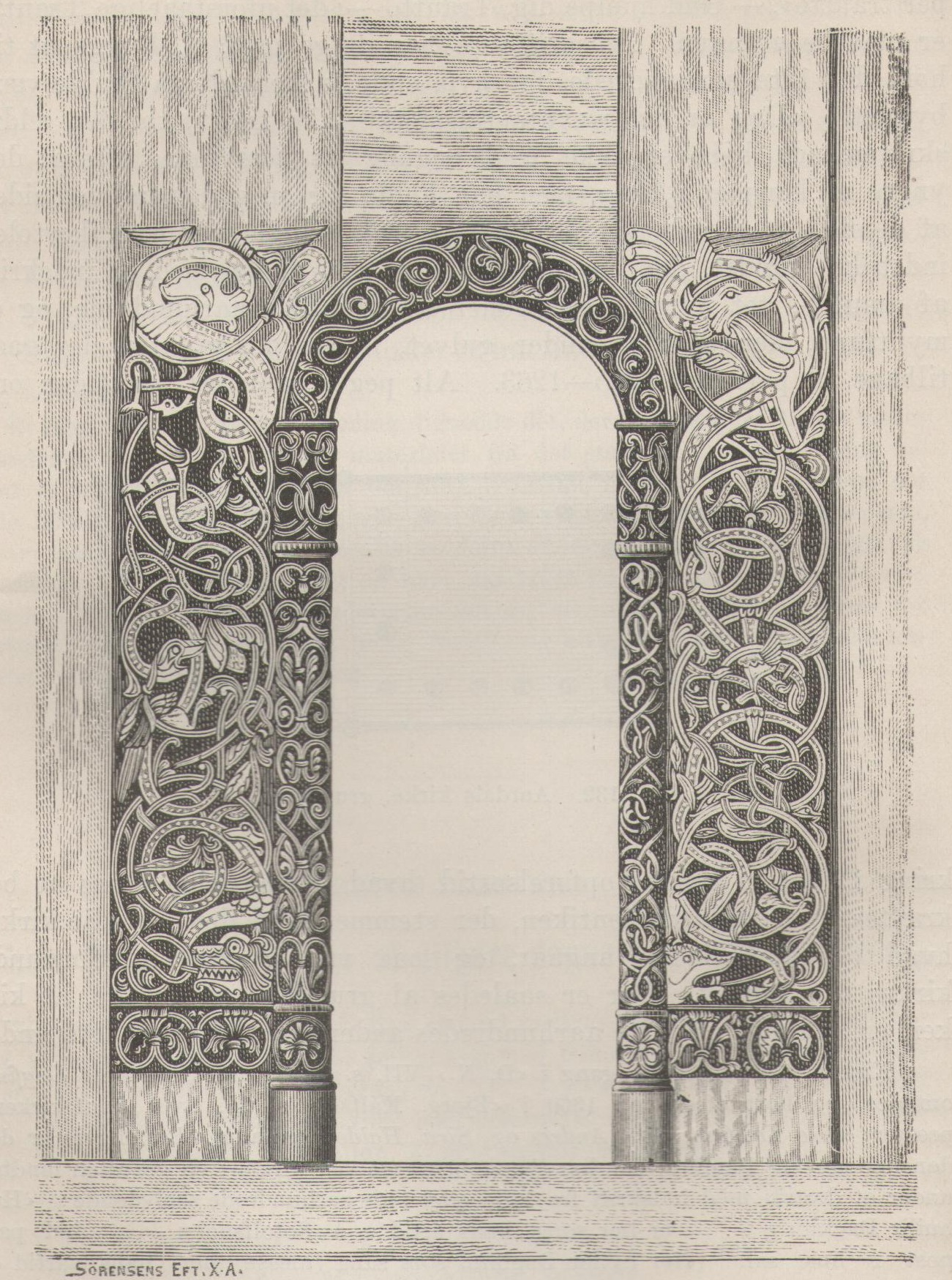
Entrance to the old church (1200-1867)

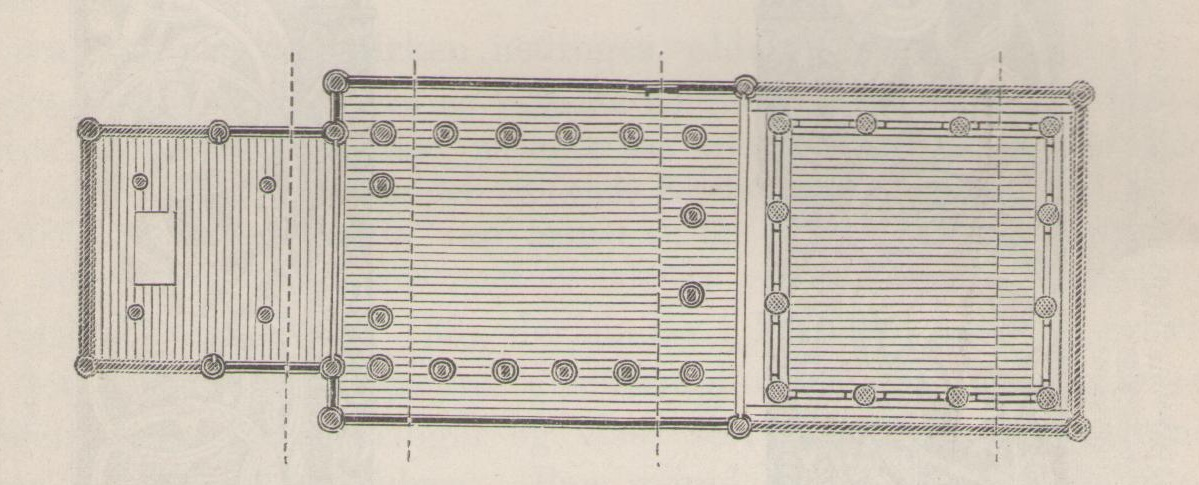
Floorplan of the old church (1200-1867)

== See also ==
- List of churches in Bjørgvin
