= Indre Offerdal =

Village in Årdal Municipality, Norway

Indre Offerdal Ofredal
- Village
- Interactive map of Indre Offerdal
- Location within Vestland Location within Norway
- Coordinates: 61.2091°N 7.5324°E
- Country: Norway
- Region: Western Norway
- County: Vestland
- District: Sogn
- Municipality: Årdal Municipality
- Elevation: 13 m (43 ft)
- Time zone: UTC+01:00 (CET)
  - Summer (DST): UTC+02:00 (CEST)

Indre Offerdal or Ofredal is a small village on the shore of the Årdalsfjorden (a branch of the Sognefjord) in Årdal Municipality in Vestland county, Norway.

== History ==
The village was the administrative center of Årdal Municipality more than 100 years ago. In those days, the main industry in Årdal was lumber, and Indre Offerdal had a strategic position near the forests and accessible by boat. Timber and grains were brought here from all over the region for use at the gristmill and sawmill. Materials were then shipped to Bergen.

Today, a small museum is built on the shore of the fjord. It consists of ten buildings including a mill, a sawmill, a warehouse, and several farm buildings dating back to the 19th century. The museum is "living" and provides meals as well as accommodation and meeting facilities. There are guided tours from June through August, or by appointment. The museum is 17 kilometres (11 mi) by a mountain road from Årdalstangen through the Seimsdalen valley.
