= Oltedalsvatnet =

Lake in Gjesdal, Norway

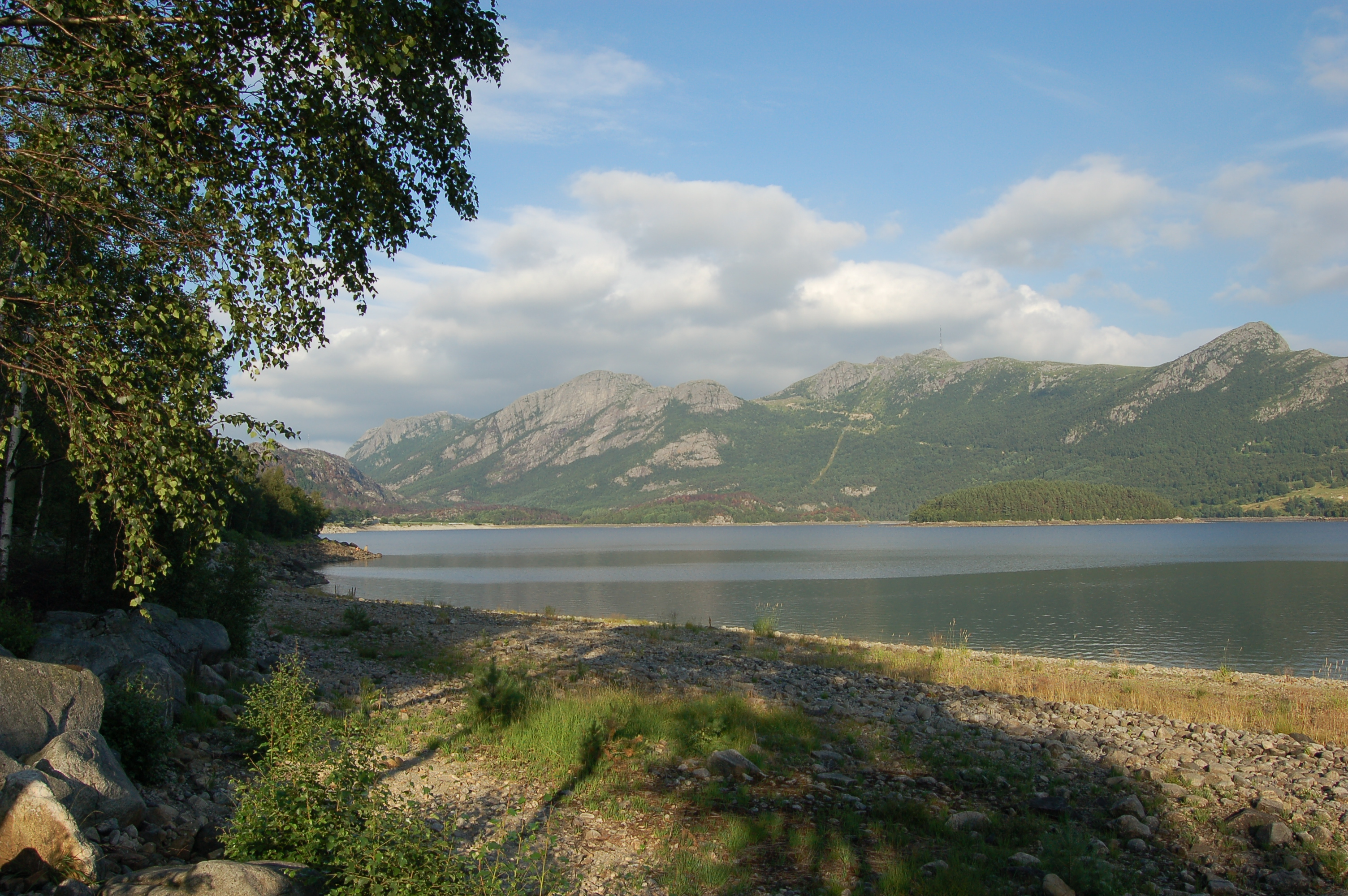
- Interactive map of Oltedalsvatnet
- Location: Gjesdal Municipality, Rogaland
- Coordinates: 58.81456°N 6.01331°E
- Primary outflows: Oltedalsåna river
- Basin countries: Norway
- Max. length: 4 kilometres (2.5 mi)
- Max. width: 1.5 kilometres (0.93 mi)
- Surface area: 3.12 km^{2} (1.20 sq mi)
- Water volume: 28,800,000 m^{3} (23,300 acre⋅ft; 37,700,000 yd^{3})
- Shore length^{1}: 16.61 kilometres (10.32 mi)
- Surface elevation: 101.5 to 112.5 metres (333 to 369 ft)
- References: NVE
- ^{1} Shore length is not a well-defined measure.

Oltedalsvatnet is a lake in Gjesdal Municipality in Rogaland county, Norway. The 3.12-square-kilometre (1.20 sq mi) lake lies just south of the village of Oltedal. It is a reservoir along the river Oltedalsåna that is used to store water for the Oltedal Hydroelectric Power Station. The lake sits at an elevation of 101.5 to 112.5 metres (333 to 369 ft) and it holds about 28,800,000 cubic metres (23,300 acre⋅ft; 37,700,000 yd^{3}).

== See also ==
- List of lakes in Norway
