= Årdalstangen =

Village in Årdal Municipality, Norway

- Village
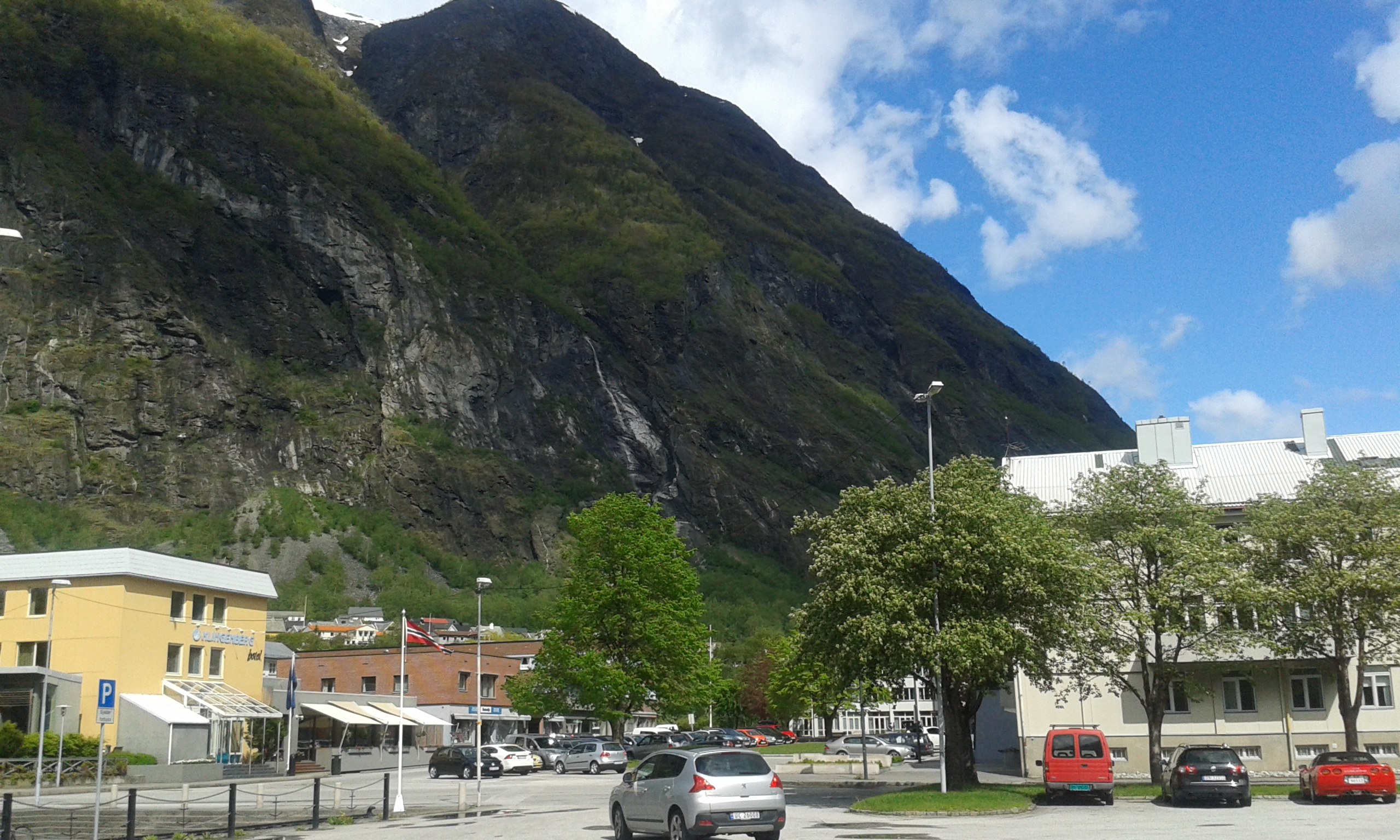
- Årdalstangen seen from the west entrance (June 2015)
- Interactive map of Årdalstangen
- Location within Vestland Location within Norway
- Coordinates: 61.2358°N 7.7037°E
- Country: Norway
- Region: Western Norway
- County: Vestland
- District: Sogn
- Municipality: Årdal Municipality

Area
  - Total: 1.18 km^{2} (0.46 sq mi)
- Elevation: 6 m (20 ft)

Population (2025)
  - Total: 1,397
  - Density: 1,184/km^{2} (3,070/sq mi)
- Time zone: UTC+01:00 (CET)
  - Summer (DST): UTC+02:00 (CEST)
- Post Code: 6885 Årdalstangen

Årdalstangen is the administrative centre of Årdal Municipality in Vestland county, Norway. The village is one of the two main population centers in the municipality, along with the village of Øvre Årdal. The 1.18-square-kilometre (290-acre) village has a population (2025) of 1,397 and a population density of 1,184 inhabitants per square kilometre (3,070/sq mi).

The village is situated along the end of the Årdalsfjorden, an inner branch off of the great Sognefjord. Årdalstangen is located about 15 kilometres (9.3 mi) northeast of the old municipal center of Indre Offerdal, and about 4 kilometres (2.5 mi) east of the Seimsdalen valley. The lake Årdalsvatnet lies to the north of the village, and 12 kilometres (7.5 mi) to the north at the other end of the lake, lies the large village of Øvre Årdal. One road and two pedestrian bridges cross Hæreidselvi river which runs through the village, flowing from lake Årdalsvatnet into the Årdalsfjord.

Årdalstangen serves as an important transportation hub for the aluminium industry. Norsk Hydro's site for production of coal for anodes and small port at the end of the Årdalsfjord are located here. The village also has a hotel and other tourist accommodations. Årdal Church is located in the village.

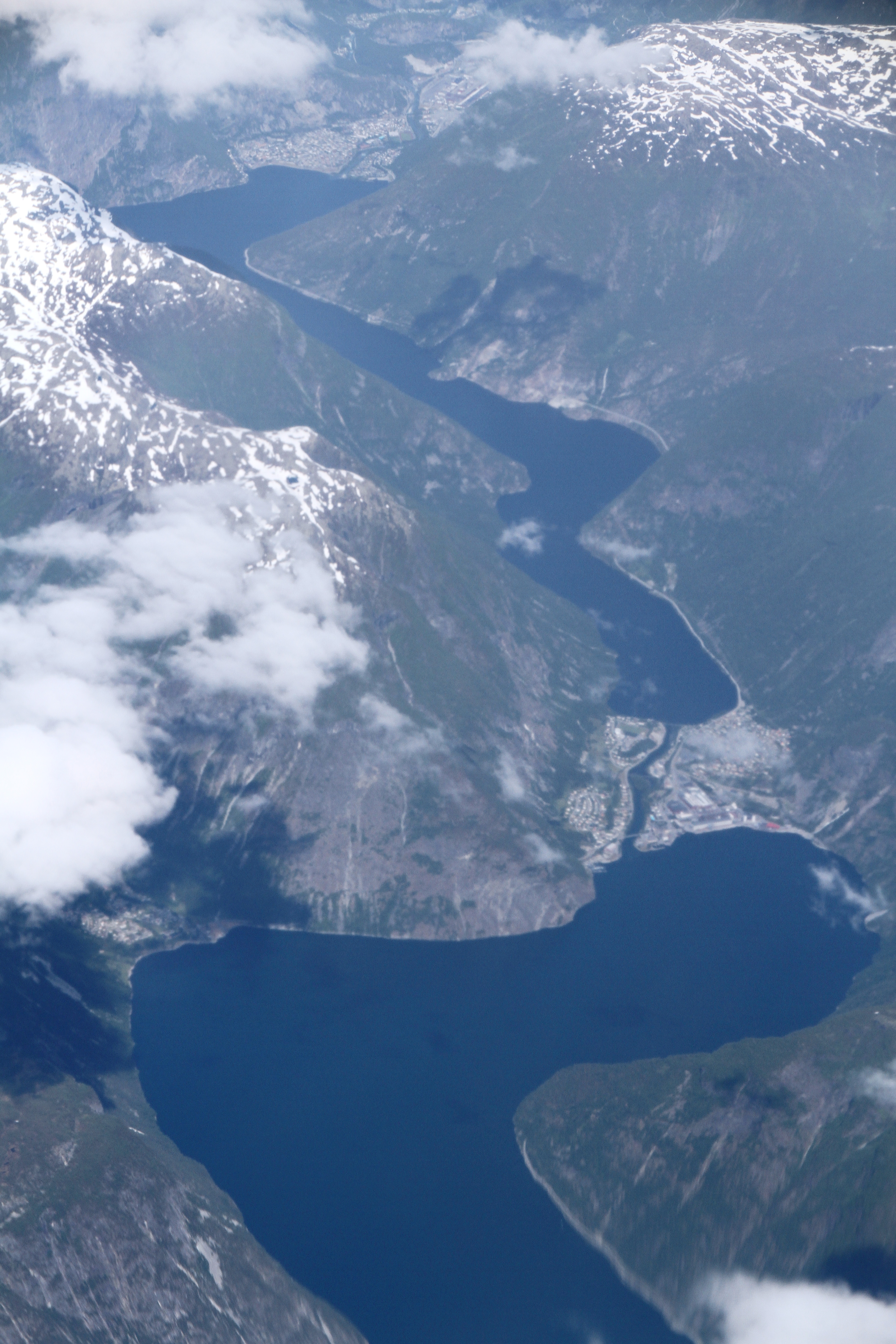
Aerial view of Årdalstangen, situated between two the Årdalsfjord and the smaller lake Årdalsvatnet

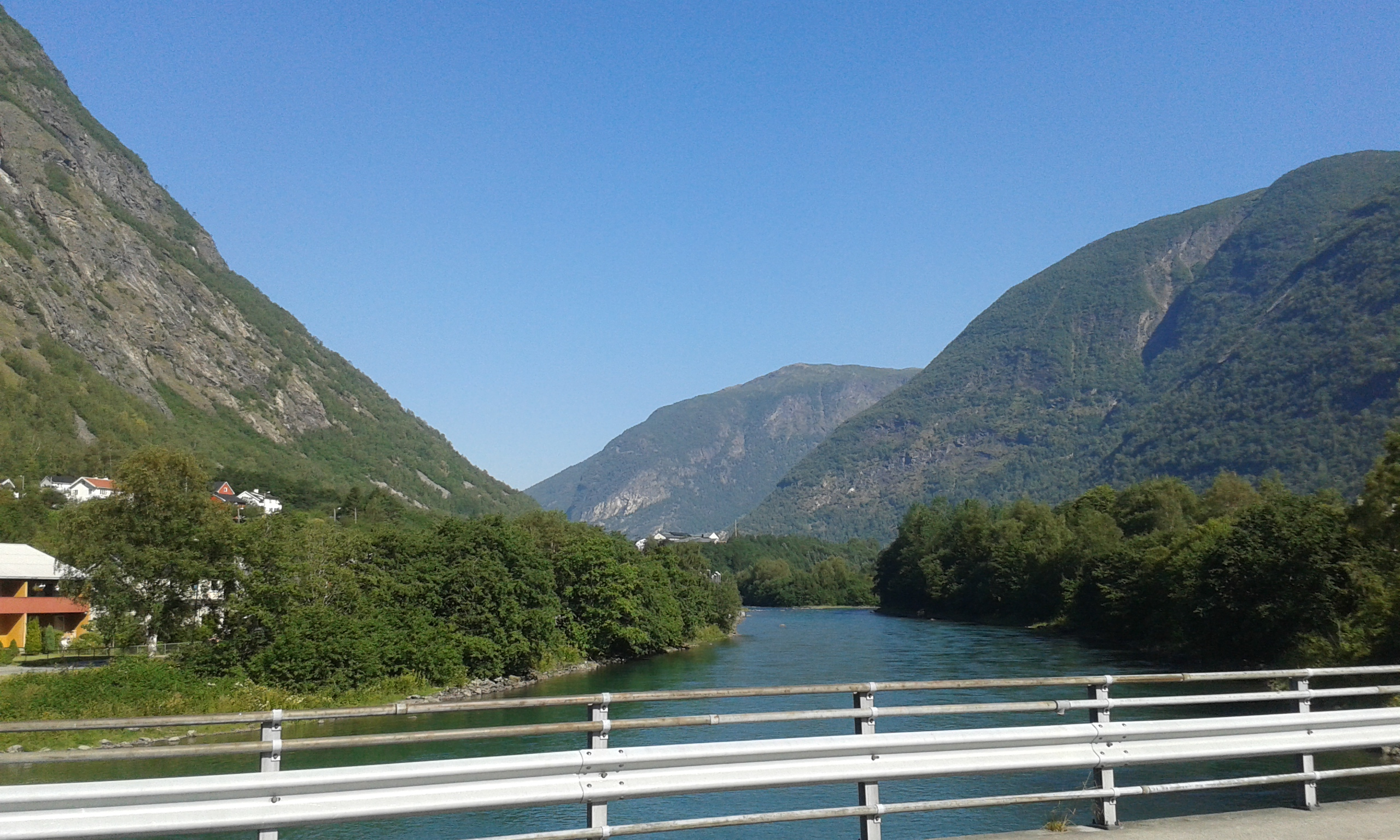
Looking upstream from the bridge over Hæreidselvi river in Årdalstangen
