= Leif Haanes =

Norwegian ship-owner and Christian leader

Leif Haanes (10 September 1932 – 5 April 2014) was a Norwegian ship-owner and Christian leader.

He was born in Kristiansand. His father Kristian Haanes was a ship-owner and chairman of the Norwegian Lutheran Mission. A lawyer by education, Leif Haanes ran the family shipping company Haanes Rederi.

As a Christian leader, he served as chairman of the Norwegian Christian Student and School Association from 1977 to 1983, was a finance committee member of the International Fellowship of Evangelical Students for twenty years and chaired the Norwegian Santal Mission from 1984 to 1993.

Haanes is known as one of the founders of Kristiansand Zoo and Amusement Park, and held 25% of the shares until the early 1990s. After meeting with Paul Freed, who told them that a major deal in spreading the Gospel of Christ through a new radiostation at Monte Carlo has been signed. they contributed with a gift to Trans World Radio for the entire first payment (of 5) to start building. Trans World Radio in Monte Carlo in 1960. He died in April 2014.
