= Roar Woldum =

Norwegian swimmer

Personal information
- Born: 2 January 1933 Oslo, Norway
- Died: 21 January 2014 (aged 81) Oslo, Norway

Sport
- Sport: Swimming

Roar Woldum (2 January 1933 – 21 January 2014) was a Norwegian freestyle swimmer. He competed in the two events at the 1952 Summer Olympics.
