= Gunilla Hegfeldt =

- Born: 26 May 1915; Gothenburg, Sweden
- Died: 16 April 2014 (aged 98); Oslo, Norway
- Education: Norwegian National Academy of Craft and Art Industry, Norwegian National Academy of Fine Arts
- Occupations: Painter and graphical artist

Gunilla Hegfeldt (26 May 1915 – 16 April 2014) was a Swedish-born Norwegian painter and graphical artist.

She was born in Gothenburg to Dagny Linnea Palmqvist and Richard Hegfeldt, and settled in Norway from 1945. She studied at the Norwegian National Academy of Craft and Art Industry from 1948 to 1949, and made further studies at the Norwegian National Academy of Fine Arts, with Jean Heiberg from 1949 to 1951, with Aage Storstein 1951–1952, and with Per Krohg 1952–1953. She made her exhibition debut at Høstutstillingen in 1955. She is represented at the National Gallery of Norway, at Riksgalleriet and other galleries.
