= Jorolf Alstad =

Norwegian nuclear chemist

Jorolf Alstad (6 April 1927 – 21 November 2014) was a Norwegian nuclear chemist.

He was born in Frol. In his younger days he was a ski jumper and football player for Frol IL, later Akademisk BK in Oslo.

Graduating with the cand.real. degree in 1957, he was a student of Alexis Pappas. He was appointed as an associate professor of nuclear chemistry at the University of Oslo in 1964, advancing to professor in 1991. He had research stints at CERN, the École européenne de chimie, polymères et matériaux and the Tokai Research Establishment. His fields of expertise included extraction, ion exchange and the chemistry of rare-earth minerals. He was inducted into the Norwegian Academy of Science and Letters in 1983.

He frequented the University of Oslo as a professor emeritus up until his death in November 2014, aged 87.
