= Oltedal =

Village in Gjesdal Municipality, Norway

- Village
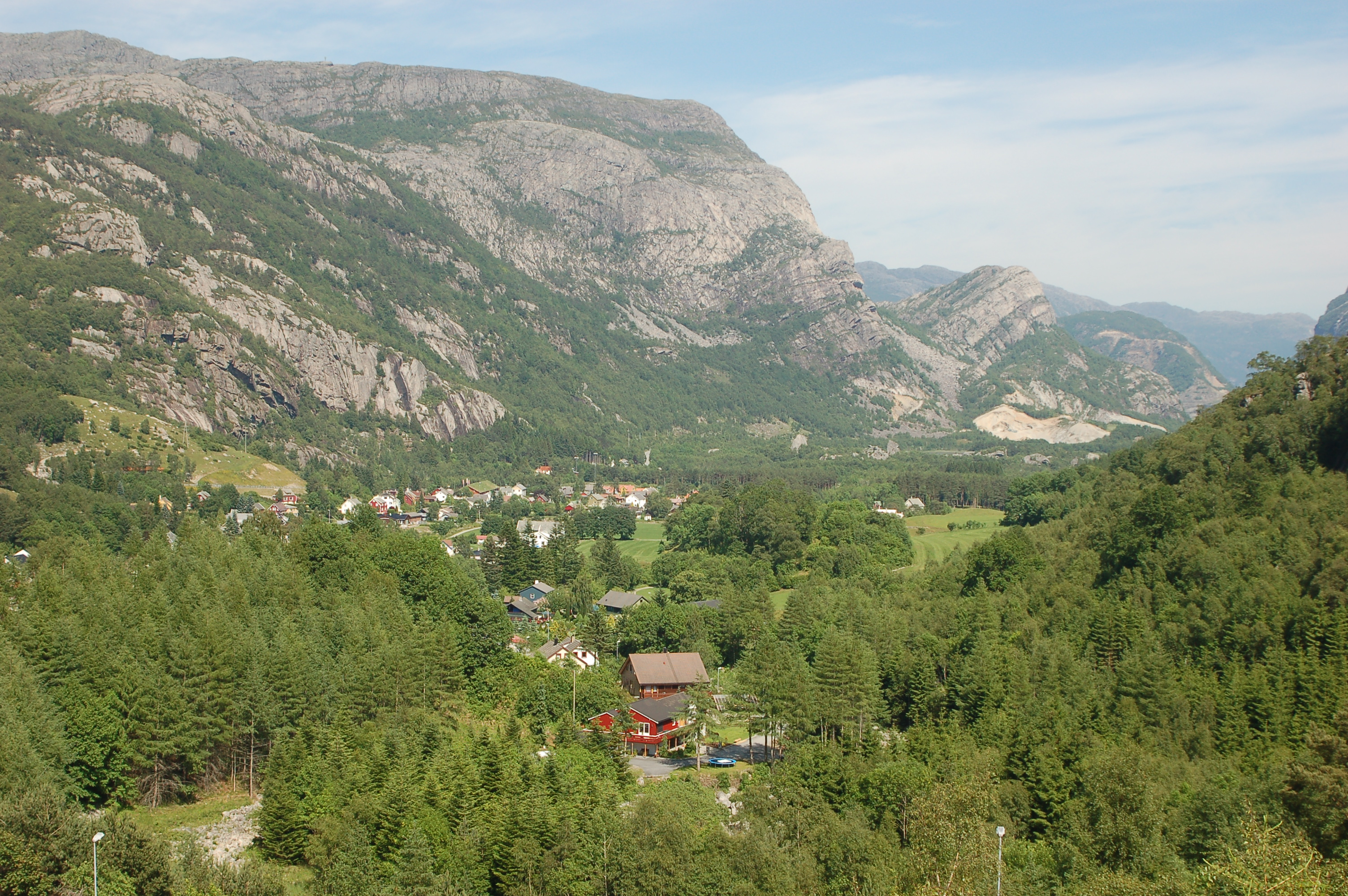
- View of the village area
- Interactive map of Oltedal
- Coordinates: 58.82939°N 6.03983°E
- Country: Norway
- Region: Western Norway
- County: Rogaland
- District: Jæren
- Municipality: Gjesdal Municipality

Area
  - Total: 0.58 km^{2} (0.22 sq mi)
- Elevation: 70 m (230 ft)

Population (2025)
  - Total: 1,013
  - Density: 1,747/km^{2} (4,520/sq mi)
- Time zone: UTC+01:00 (CET)
  - Summer (DST): UTC+02:00 (CEST)
- Post Code: 4333 Oltedal

Oltedal is a village in Gjesdal Municipality in Rogaland county, Norway. The village is located in a narrow river valley about 11 kilometres (6.8 mi) northeast of the municipal centre of Ålgård and about 9 kilometres (5.6 mi) west of the village of Dirdal, just west of the Høgsfjorden. The lake Oltedalsvatnet lies on the southwestern edge of the village. Oltedal Church is located in the village. The village has some small industries such as yarn making, chemicals, and sand/gravel pits.

The 0.58-square-kilometre (140-acre) village has a population (2025) of 1,013 and a population density of 1,747 inhabitants per square kilometre (4,520/sq mi).
