= Gudbrand Bakken =

Norwegian veterinarian and civil servant (1941–2024)

- Born: 13 May 1941; Fåvang, Reichskommissariat Norwegen (today Norway)
- Died: 1 October 2024 (aged 83)
- Education: Norwegian School of Veterinary Science
- Occupations: Veterinarian; Civil servant

Gudbrand Bakken (13 May 1941 – 1 October 2024) was a Norwegian veterinarian and civil servant. He was director of Veterinærinstituttet, and served as director general at the Ministry of Agriculture and Food.

== Career ==
Born in Fåvang on 13 May 1941, Bakken graduated from the Norwegian School of Veterinary Science in 1965, and earned a doctorate degree in 1981. Working at Veterinærinstituttet from 1974, he was appointed director of the institute from 1990 to 1998. He was appointed director general (ekspedisjonssjef) in the Ministry of Agriculture and Food from 1998 to 2006.

He was decorated Knight, First Class of the Order of St. Olav in 2007.

Bakken died on 1 October 2024, at the age of 83.
