= Ole Enger (actor) =

Norwegian actor and businessperson

- Born: 29 December 1948
- Died: 26 April 2014 (aged 65); Oslo

Ole Enger (1948 – 26 April 2014) was a Norwegian actor and businessperson.

As a teenager he played the popular role of Stompa in the films Stompa til sjøs, Stompa forelsker seg and Stompa selvfølgelig. He took an accountant education, became chief financial officer in Erling Sande Gruppen and Bergheim before being managing director of Stor-Oslo Service and Persontransport Norge. He died in April 2014 after a long battle with cancer.

== Filmography ==
Year	Title	Role	Notes
1963	Stompa, selvfølgelig!	Stompa / Stein Oskar Magel Paus-Andersen	
1965	Stompa forelsker seg	Stompa	
1967	Stompa til Sjøs!	Stompa / Stein Oskar Magel Paus-Andersen	(final film role)
