= Erik Sture Larre =

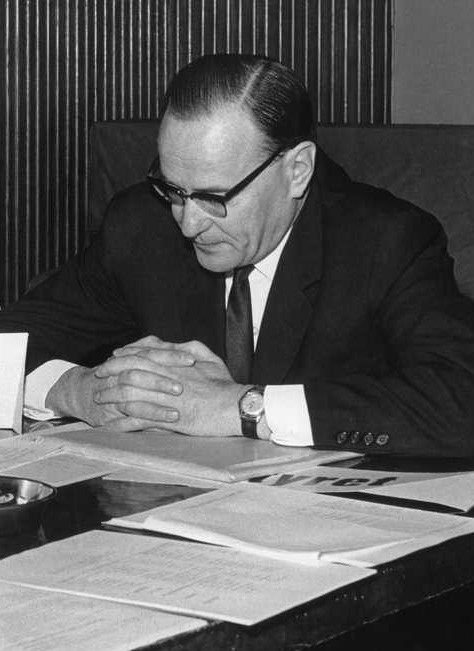
Erik Sture Larre

Erik Sture Larre (31 March 1914 – 11 November 2014) was a Norwegian lawyer, resistance member, sports official and environmentalist.

== Early life and education ==
He was born in Oslo, and grew up in Gamlebyen. He studied law, was a research assistant at the Norwegian Institute for Social Research from 1936 to 1940 and graduated from the University of Oslo with the cand.jur. degree in 1941.

== World War II ==
During the occupation of Norway by Nazi Germany Larre was active in Milorg, for some time heading the branch 13100. He was arrested by the Nazi authorities in February 1943. He was incarcerated in Møllergata 19 until June, then placed in Grini concentration camp until December. He was back in M19 until March 1944, then incarcerated at Grini again until the war's end. He was decorated with the War Medal with star.

== Later career ==
From 1945 to 1989 he practised law in Oslo. In business, he chaired the supervisory council of Gjensidige NOR and was a supervisory council member of Sparebanken Nord-Norge, Sparebanken Vest, SpareBank 1 Midt-Norge and DnB NOR. He also sat on the electoral committees of several banks.

He was active in ice hockey, chairing SK Forward for twenty non-consecutive years. He served as vice president and president of the Norwegian Ice Hockey Association, and deputy chair of the law committee in the Norwegian Confederation of Sports. He has been awarded honorary membership in all those organizations (honorary presidency in the Ice Hockey Association). He presided over the Oslo District Outdoor Recreation Association and the national association, Friluftsrådenes Landsforbund; and was an honorary member of the Oslo District Outdoor Recreation Association and the Oslo and Akershus Society for the Conservation of Nature. He has been called "the father of the Marka boundary", having spent major parts of his life campaigning for the outdoors area north of Oslo and the legal ratification of the current boundary.

He was awarded the St. Hallvard Medal in 1986 and the King's Medal of Merit in silver in 2010. He resided at Madserud. Around his 100th birthday, he gained interest in national media. In an interview he was quoted on only sleeping three and a half hours a night. He also criticized the treatment of the elderly in the workforce, in particular due to the mandatory retirement from public jobs in Norway at age 70. He died in November 2014.
