= Alf Kvasbø =

Norwegian writer

- Born: November 7, 1928; Vadsø, Norway
- Died: January 7, 2014 (aged 86)
- Occupation: Author
- Writing career
- Language: Norwegian
- Genre: Fiction

Alf Kvasbø (7 November 1928 – 7 January 2014) was a Norwegian teacher and children's book author.

== Biography ==
Kvasbø was born in Vadsø Municipality and later be was a resident in Kongsvinger Municipality. A special educator by profession, he made his literary debut in 1962 with Vi ror i natt and followed up with Måsen (1963),"Jubel" I storm (1963) and Nærkamp (1974). He later wrote numerous books that stand out in the children's and young adult genres, namely Springflo (1978), Verk (1979), Besøkstid (1981), Døgn (1983), Venner (1998) and Bitter hamn (1999).
