= Jærbladet =

Norwegian local newspaper

- Format: Tabloid
- Owner: Jæren Avis AS
- Founded: 1949
- Headquarters: Bryne
- Circulation: 13,264 (2008)
- Website: www.jbl.no/

Jærbladet is a Norwegian local newspaper published in Bryne, at Jæren in county Rogaland. It covers the three municipalities: Time, Hå, and Klepp. It is issued three days a week, Monday, Wednesday, and Friday. It started in 1949. The newspaper tends to use the written form of nynorsk (modernized Norwegian), typical for the western counties, but bokmål (modernized Dano-Norwegian) as well.

Jærbladet is published by Jærbladet AS, which is owned by Amedia.

== Circulation ==
- 2007: 13,064, of whom 12,862 are subscribers.
- 2008: 13,264, of whom 13,032 are subscribers.
