= Rolf S. Thorsen =

Norwegian politician

Rolf S. Thorsen (9 June 1934 – 27 August 2014) was a Norwegian politician for the Labour Party.

He served as a deputy representative to the Parliament of Norway from Hordaland during the term 1981–1985. In total he met during 3 days of parliamentary session.
