= Magnhild Gravir =

Norwegian children's writer

- Born: 23 October 1941 (age 84); Dalen, Lårdal Municipality, Reichskommissariat Norwegen (today Norway)
- Occupations: College lecturer children's writer non-fiction writer
- Employer: Oslo University College

Magnhild Gravir (born 1941) is a Norwegian children's writer and non-fiction writer, and former college lecturer.

== Life and career ==
Born in Dalen, Telemark on 23 October 1941, Gravir graduated as cand.philol. from the University of Oslo in 1972. Her thesis is a treatment of the book Mysterium by Alfred Hauge. She was appointed at Barnevernsakademiet from 1971 (later included into Oslo University College/OsloMet).

Her first children's book was Den eldande raude beveren from 1976, illustrated by Kjersti Scheen. The book contains stories about the little girl Ragnhild, which first appeared in the radio show for small children, Barnetimen for de minste. Ragnhild lives in a rural society, and both her mother and father are busy with work on their farm and in the forest, while her elder sister is a schoolgirl, and Ragnhild has to play much for herself. Her second book about Ragnhild, Den rare dagen (1977) earned her the Nynorsk barnelitteraturpris. Further books in the series are Ut å reise (1978), and Syttande mai (1979). The children's books, except for the first, were illustrated by Borghild Rud.

She wrote the textbook Bøker for barn – analyse – vurdering – formidling in 1979, jointly with Olav Imenes.
