= Reidar Floeng =

Norwegian politician

John Reidar Floeng (15 May 1918 – 24 December 2014) was a Norwegian politician for the Conservative Party.

He was born in Åsnes, but moved to Mysen. He started his career in the Norwegian State Railways, but inherited his father-in-law's company Ous & Co in 1948. After thirty years as chief executive he finished his career as office manager in Lundeby & Co.

Floeng was elected as mayor of Mysen, serving from 1952 to 1955. He served as a deputy representative to the Parliament of Norway from Østfold during the term 1961–1965.
