= Marit Svarva Henriksen =

Norwegian politician

Marit Svarva Henriksen (27 April 1925 – 9 June 2014) was a Norwegian politician for the Labour Party.

She was born in Skogn Municipality, Norway. She attended folk high school, worked for Televerket in Skogn for 25 years before being hired by Stjørdal Municipality in 1966. She later attended the Nordic folk high school in Geneva (1960) as well as several other courses.

She was elected as a local politician in Skogn Municipality (later part of Levanger Municipality), together with her twin sister, and was also a member of Nord-Trøndelag county council. She finished her service on the municipal council of Levanger Municipality in 2003. She served as a deputy representative to the Parliament of Norway from Nord-Trøndelag during the terms 1958–1961, 1961–1965 and 1969–1973. In total she met during 10 days of parliamentary session.

She also became known as head of the jury in the 1983 court case against serial killer Arnfinn Nesset.
