= Thorleif Holth =

Norwegian politician

Thorleif Holth (23 February 1931 – 14 April 2014) was a Norwegian politician for the Labour Party.

He served as a deputy representative to the Parliament of Norway from Oslo during the term 1961–1965, and then again much later during 1997–2001. In total he met during 9 days of parliamentary session.
