= Robert Heetmøller =

Norwegian painter (1950–2014)

Robert Heetmøller (28 June 1950 – 13 January 2014) was a Norwegian painter.

He was born in Trondheim, but grew up in Oppsal in Oslo. He attended the Norwegian National Academy of Craft and Art Industry from 1968 to 1971 and the Norwegian National Academy of Fine Arts from 1974 to 1975 and 1978 to 1981. His debuted at the Autumn Exhibition in 1978, and also exhibited here in 1979 and 1980. His works were later bought by the Parliament of Norway and the Arts Council of Norway.

He resided in Oslo. He died in January 2014 at a care center in Oslo.
