= Ole Moe (editor) =

Norwegian politician

Ole Moe (9 October 1918 – 14 January 2014) was a Norwegian newspaper editor and politician for the Labour Party.

He hailed from Steinkjer Municipality and started his press career in Arbeider-Avisen in 1939. The Second World War interrupted the career, but he was back in Arbeider-Avisen in 1945. He was then editor-in-chief of Rana Blad from 1949 to 1970 and Sarpsborg Arbeiderblad from 1970 to 1984. During his career he also represented the Labour Party in the municipal council of Rana Municipality and also on the Nordland county council. Also, he was the leader of the Sarpsborg Labour Party. He was a board member of the Association of Norwegian Editors, Biblioteksentralen and Borgarsyssel Museum and active in Rotary.

He resided in Sarpsborg, was married and had three children. He died in January 2014.
