= Tor Milde =

Norwegian journalist (1953–2014)

- Born: 14 January 1953; Oslo, Norway
- Died: 15 January 2014 (aged 61); Oslo, Norway
- Occupations: Journalist, writer
- Years active: 1984–2014
- Partner: Irja Anthi
- Children: 2

Tor Milde (14 January 1953 – 15 January 2014) was a Norwegian music journalist and writer. He was a judge on the music competition Idol in 2005 and 2006.

Born in Oslo, he began his career in journalism in 1984 and was best known as a music journalist and critic for Verdens Gang (VG).

Milde had two sons and a girlfriend, Irja Anthi. He died following a brief illness on the morning of 15 January 2014, aged 61, at the Ullevål University Hospital in his hometown of Oslo.
