= Erna Mundal Pedersen =

Norwegian politician (1929–2014)

Erna Mundal Pedersen (7 January 1929 – 27 March 2014) was a Norwegian politician for the Conservative Party and the Progress Party.

She hailed from Høyanger. In 1979 she was elected as a deputy member of the municipal council of Bergen Municipality, later becoming council member. She switched to the Progress Party in 1987, and eventually became City Commissioner for Health and Social Services. Her endeavors within social services earned her the comparison to John Alvheim. She finished her political career in Fyllingsdalen borough council. She also served as a deputy representative to the Parliament of Norway from Hordaland during the term 1989–1993, albeit without being present in parliamentary session.
