= Bjørn Johan Landmark =

Norwegian physicist

Bjørn Johan Landmark (26 June 1927 – 17 July 2014) was a Norwegian physicist.

He was born in Bergen. He took his cand.real. degree in 1952 and the dr.philos. degree already in 1955. He worked as research director for the Norwegian Defence Research Establishment from 1967 to 1977, director of space research in NTNF from 1977 to 1987, and then director of the Norwegian Space Centre from 1987 to 1993. He was also an adjunct professor at the University of Oslo. He was a fellow of the Norwegian Academy of Science and Letters.
