= Thore Heramb =

Norwegian painter and illustrator

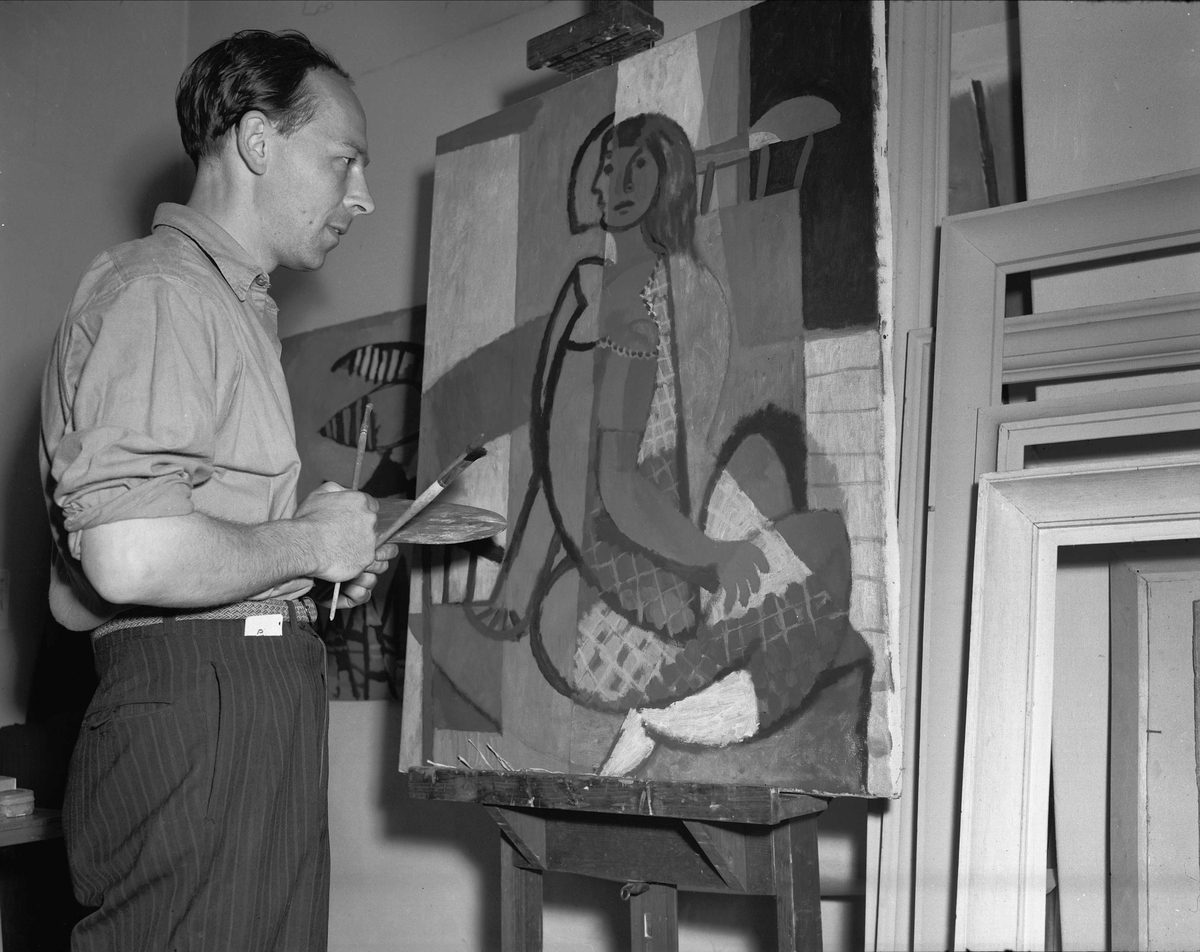
Thore Heramb in 1949.

Thore Heramb (29 December 1916 – 16 June 2014) was a Norwegian painter and illustrator. His art was inspired by impressionism and by cubism. His artistic style is commonly described as colourist and frequently featured abstracted landscapes.

== Biography ==
He was born in Kristiania (now Oslo), Norway. He was the son of Gustav Heramb (1886–1956) and Signe Marie Michelsen (1891–1966). He was trained at the Norwegian National Academy of Craft and Art Industry (1935–37) and at the Norwegian National Academy of Fine Arts under Jean Heiberg (1939–1940). He debuted at the Høstutstillingen in Oslo during 1938 and held his first solo exhibition at the Kunstnerforbundet in 1943.

He was awarded the Schäffers legat (1946), Houens legat (1947) and Conrad Mohrs stip. (1951). He conducted study trips to Italy (1939), Copenhagen (1946), Paris (1949) and Provence (1951–52).

Between 1947 and 1948, he performed the decorations for the Aker Town Hall (Akers herredshus). Located at Trondheimsveien 5, the building features his motif Fossen, a designed inspired by the Akerselva which flows through Oslo. Among his other notable works are the painting Rød figur i blå sofa from 1950 and the triptykon Palestina-trio from 1973 to 1979. The Norwegian Museum of Contemporary Art has acquired twenty of his works. He is represented at the National Gallery in Oslo as well as at Bergen Billedgalleri, Trondheim Kunstmuseum, Llllehamrner Kunstmuseurn and Rogaland Kunstmuseum. Internationally his work is featured at the National Gallery of Denmark, Gothenburg Museum of Art and Stockholm City Museum.

== Personal life ==
Thore Heramb was married twice. He first married Ellen Schiøtz (1918–1942). Following her death, he married Randi Synnøve Eriksen in 1944.

== Selected works ==
- Pont d'Arcole (1952) National Gallery
- Vinterkveld i Oslo (1965) National Gallery
- Bjørkeskog (1967) National Gallery
- Huldreberget (1972) National Gallery
- Krattskog (1981) National Museum of Art, Architecture and Design

== Related reading ==
- Heramb, Thore (2006) Thore Heramb (Oslo: Labyrinth Press) ISBN 9788273930385
