= Per Rollum =

Norwegian alpine skier (1928–2014)

Personal information
- Nationality: Norwegian
- Born: 3 December 1928; Oslo
- Died: 18 May 2014 (aged 85)

Sport
- Sport: Alpine skiing
- Club: IL Heming

Per Rollum (3 December 1928 – 18 May 2014) was a Norwegian alpine skier.

He was born in Oslo and represented the club IL Heming. He participated at the 1952 Winter Olympics in Oslo, where he placed eighth in slalom. He became Norwegian champion in giant slalom in 1952 and 1953, and in slalom in 1953.

He died in May 2014.
