= Lillen Dahll Vogt =

Norwegian printmaker (1918–2014)

Lillen Dahll Vogt (20 May 1918 – 31 January 2014) was a Norwegian printmaker and painter.

Born Jeanette Dahll in Kragerø, she married journalist Per Vogt and settled in the same city. She originally studied geology at the University of Oslo from 1940 to 1943, when the University was closed following a fire. She joined the resistance against the German occupation of Norway, aiding people in escaping to Sweden by boat.

After the war she studied at the Norwegian National Academy of Fine Arts from 1949 to 1952 under Per Krohg, Jean Heiberg and Aage Storstein. She spent time in Himalaya in the late 1950s. Following a short internship at the Norwegian National Academy of Craft and Art Industry with Chrix Dahl in 1968, she held her first solo exhibition in 1969 in Larvik.

She incorporated Himalaya as well as other locations like France and Svalbard in her art, mostly working with etchings, aquatint and chalcography. Secondarily, she was a painter, among others of aquarels and gouaches.

She was a part of the Autumn Exhibition in 1972, 1973, 1974, 1976, 1980 and 1983. She held solo exhibitions in Norway as well as Brasília (1979) and Munich (1981). Her works were bought by the National Gallery of Norway, the Arts Council of Norway, Riksgalleriet and several regional galleries.
