= Alf Næsheim =

Norwegian painter and illustrator

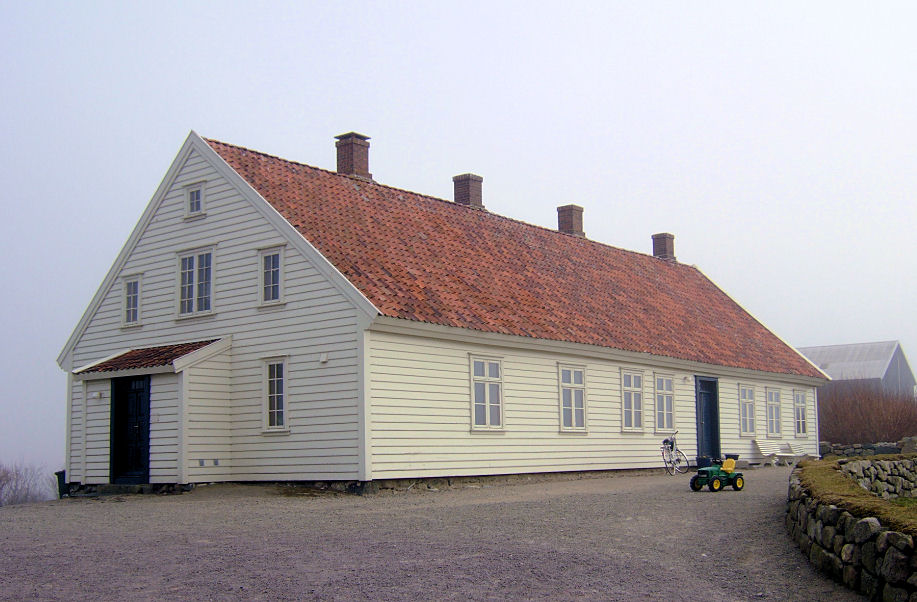
Næsheim exhibited his works at the Hå priesthouse in 1985, the area where he grew up.

Alf Gabriel Næsheim (18 February 1926, Stavanger - 25 December 2014, Bærum) was a Norwegian painter and illustrator, mostly known for his architectural drawings from the city of Oslo, but also for being the first Norwegian artist that illustrated Disney comic book stories featuring Donald Duck.

Næsheim was born and grew up in Stavanger. He moved to Oslo in 1945, where he was employed as an illustrator for the Aftenposten newspaper until retiring in 1995. He also illustrated the sports section of the Dagbladet newspaper between 1968 and 1981, as well as having shorter contracts with Stavanger Aftenblad and Jærbladet. He was educated at Statens håndverks- og kunstindustriskole in Oslo 1945–1950, Académie de la Grande Chaumière in Paris 1947 and Goldsmiths College of Art in London 1951. His debut as a graphics artist was in 1948, and he held his first separate exhibition in 1985 at the old priestyard in Hå Municipality in 1985.

His father was the painter Sverre Næsheim (1900–1976). Alf Gabriel was the brother of the illustrator Egil Torin Næsheim (born 1937) and the father of the artist Yngve Næsheim (born 1960).

== Donald Duck-incident ==
In the 1960s, he worked for an advertising agency, having contracted the Hjemmet weekly publishing company, whose editor Ernst Gervin asked Næsheim to write stories for the weekly comic Donald Duck & Co (Norwegian). Næsheim then created the "Vending machine mystery" (in Norwegian, "Automatmysteriet", Næsheims manuscript, November 1968) and "Manko i Regnskapet" (Gervins manuscript, January 1969). The copyrights were sold to the Danish Gutenberghus, and the stories were published in other Nordic countries as well as in Germany. Næsheim turned down the offer from Gutenberghus to become a regular writer, turning out around 20 stories a year.

== Awards ==
- 2. prize in the VII. Int. Exhibition of Sports Illustrations 1983
- Oslo Artist Award (Oslo Bys kunstnerpris) 1992 for his 10-volume series Kristiania i Oslo

== Publications ==
- Næsheim, Alf (1983). I god-drøs: folkeminne fra det gamle Jæren (in Norwegian). Jærinfo. p. 105.
- Næsheim, Alf (1992). Til deg du Jæren, tekst og akvareller (in Norwegian).
- Næsheim, Alf (1987–1995). Kristiania i Oslo: Hovedstadsvandringer med skissebok (in Norwegian). Vol. 1–10. Schibsted.
- Næsheim, Alf (2009). Suldal, barndommens og ungdommens eventyrrike. Skisser 1936-1945 (in Norwegian). Suldal Sogelag. ISBN 978-82-996123-3-3.
