= Bjørn Barth =

Norwegian diplomat and ambassador (1931–2014)

Bjørn Barth (born 22 March 1931 – 1 May 2014) was a Norwegian diplomat and ambassador.

== Biography ==
He was born at Sandefjord in Vestfold, Norway. He entered the Norwegian Foreign Service in 1959. He served in numerous positions including with the embassy in Brussels (1973-1977), with Norway's delegation to the OECD in Paris 1975-1976 and the Embassy of Washington, D.C. (1977-1981). He also served as the Norwegian ambassador to Baghdad (1981-82), to the OECD in Paris (1989-93), to Athens (1993-96) and at The Hague (1996-99).
