= Jarle Ofstad =

Norwegian physician (1927–2014)

Jarle Ofstad (1 April 1927 – 17 December 2014) was a Norwegian physician.

He was born in Ålesund. He became a chief physician at Haukeland University Hospital in 1965, docent at the University of Bergen in 1966 and professor of internal medicine at the University of Bergen from 1973, retiring in 2007. From 1977 to 1987 he was a chief physician at Haukeland University Hospital. From 1983 to 1992 he was the board chairman of the Chr. Michelsen Institute. He was decorated as a Knight, First Class of the Order of St. Olav.
