= Jon Sandsmark =

Jon Sandsmark (26 November 1941 – 31 May 2014) was a Norwegian textile artist.

He was born in Nesbyen, and grew up in Nesbyen and Svolvær. He took his education at the Bergen National Academy of the Arts. His main form of expression was the tapestry.
