= Atle Kittang =

Norwegian literary researcher and critic (1941–2013)

Atle Kittang (20 March 1941 – 1 June 2013) was a Norwegian literary researcher and literary critic.

His doctorate thesis from 1973 was a study on the French poet Arthur Rimbaud. He was professor at the University of Bergen, since 1974. His research included studies on works by Knut Hamsun and Henrik Ibsen. Among his books are Litteraturkritiske problem (1975) and Moderne litteraturteori – en innføring (1993). He was a member of the Norwegian Academy of Science and Letters.
