= Mari Bjørgan =

Norwegian actress and comedian (1950–2014)

- Born: 7 November 1950
- Died: 30 November 2014 (aged 64)
- Occupations: Actress; Comedian

Mari Bjørgan (7 November 1950 – 30 November 2014) was a Norwegian actress and variety show comedian, born in Stavern.

She acted in both movies and on television, but is best known from variety shows and one person shows. She had great success with her performances 101 valentinere, and Norge rundt med buksa nede.

== Select filmography ==
- 1992: Nordexpressen
- 1989: Bryllupsfesten
- 1985: Deilig er fjorden!
- 1985: Noe helt annet
- 1982: 50/50
- 1982: Brødrene Dal og spektralsteinene (television miniseries)
- 1981: Julia Julia
