= Bjørn Tore Bryn =

Bjørn Tore Bryn (1936 – 2014) was a Norwegian news anchor and radio personality.

He hailed from Trysil Municipality. In the 1960s, he was a news anchor for Dagsrevyen, the main newscast of the Norwegian Broadcasting Corporation, at that time the only television channel in Norway. In 1973, he was hired at the Norwegian Broadcasting Corporation district office in Hedmark/Oppland, which demerged in 1981, with the head office being in Elverum. He was on the editorial staff, and worked in district and national radio. He died in 2014.
