= Hans Petter Tholfsen =

Norwegian harness racer (1946–2014)

Hans Petter Tholfsen (2 November 1946 – 10 September 2014) was a Norwegian harness racer.

He won 3,986 registered races during his career, which started in the 1960s. He hailed from Sandefjord and resided in Tjodalyng. He died from cancer in September 2014).
