= Arne Løvlie =

Norwegian zoologist

Arne Mathias Løvlie (11 March 1931 – 24 March 2014) was a Norwegian zoologist.

He was born in Raufoss. He took the cand.real. degree at the University of Oslo in 1958 and the dr.philos. degree in 1964 with the thesis Genetic control of division rate and morphogenesis in Ulva mutabilis. He was appointed professor at the University of Oslo in 1970. He was a fellow of the Norwegian Academy of Science and Letters.
