= John Bjørnebye =

Norwegian diplomat (1941–2017)

Norway Ambassador to Japan
- In office 1994–1999

John Bjørnebye (12 January 1941 – 3 May 2017) was a Norwegian diplomat.

He was born in Tromsø, and was a cand.philol. by education. He started working for the Norwegian Ministry of Foreign Affairs in 1970. He served as the Norwegian consul-general in New York City from 1989 to 1994, and then as the Norwegian ambassador to Japan from 1994 to 1999. After two years in the Ministry of Foreign Affairs, he was the Norwegian ambassador to Belgium from 2001 to 2006. Bjørnebye died on 3 May 2017, aged 76.
