= Eldrid Straume =

Norwegian archaeologist

Eldrid Margrete Straume (1929 – 29 December 2014) was a Norwegian archaeologist.

Straume hailed from Sandane. She graduated from the University of Bergen in 1956, and studied for two years in Germany. In 1964, she was hired as a lecturer at the University of Oslo. She took her doctorate degree in 1984, and specialized in the archaeology of Norway. She was hired as a professor at the University of Bergen in 1990, and after a few years returned to Oslo as a professor there. She was a fellow of the Norwegian Academy of Science and Letters.
