= Jens Christian Hansen =

Norwegian geographer (1932–2014)

Jens Christian Hansen (5 May 1932 in Bodø – 8 May 2014) was a Norwegian geographer.

He took the dr.philos. degree in 1970 with the thesis Administrative grenser og tettstedsvekst. After a period as a docent at the Norwegian School of Economics he was a professor at the University of Bergen from 1972. He was a fellow of the Norwegian Academy of Science and Letters from 1985, of the Academia Europaea and of the Royal Norwegian Society of Sciences and Letters. He died in May 2014.
