= Jan Deberitz =

Norwegian novelist (1950–2014)

Jan Deberitz (16 May 1950 – 8 June 2014) was a Norwegian novelist.

He was a graduate from teachers' college, having previously interrupted his education at the Royal Norwegian Naval Academy. He made his name with the children's fantasy book Morgentåkedalen (1981) and followed with two books about Morgenkåpedyret (1996 og 2006) as well as the historical novel trilogy Jernaldertrilogien (1983–87). Deberitz lived in Greece and England in addition to his native Norway. He died in June 2014.
