= Andreas Bjørkum =

Norwegian philologist (1932–2014)

Andreas Aarskog Bjørkum (30 March 1932 – 1 April 2014) was a Norwegian philologist who specialized in dialectology.

== Early life and education ==
He was born in Årdal Municipality and grew up in Nattvik. He finished his secondary education in Eidsvoll in 1953 and graduated from the University of Oslo with the cand.philol. degree in 1962. He worked for the Norsk Ordbok project, then as a research assistant at the Norwegian Dialect Archive (now a section at the Department of Linguistics and Scandinavian Studies, University of Oslo). After a research fellowship from 1968 to 1972, he issued his doctoral thesis Generasjonsskilnad i indresognsmål in 1974.

== Career ==
Bjørkum was a docent at the University of Oslo from 1973, then professor from 1984 to his retirement in 2002. Dialects on which he has published major academic works include Inner Sogn, Gudbrandsdalen, Oppdal, and Suldal. He wrote extensively on the dialect use in well-known Norwegian authorships, such as Olav H. Hauge in the book Målmeistaren frå Ulvik (1998). He followed with similar books about Tarjei Vesaas (2010), Sjur Bygd (2011) and Johannes Heggland (2012). In 2004 he issued the local history Soga om Viki og Vikadalen. Garden, grendi, ætti.

In 1992 he became a fellow of the Norwegian Academy of Science and Letters. A Festschrift was issued to his 70th birthday. He was a member of the professional committee of the Norwegian Language Council from 1980 to 1992. He was active in Norsk Måldyrkingslag, Friends of Det Norske Teatret and Noregs Ungdomslag, the latter as local leader in the Oslo district. He was known for penning his 230 articles in handwriting, not using a computer.

== Personal life ==
Bjørkum was married to Ragna Myrstad from 1968 to her death in 1996. Their son Per Sæmund Bjørkum is a violinist in the Oslo Philharmonic. He resided in Hosle, later Hvalstad. He died in April 2014.
