= Annine Qvale =

Norwegian writer and illustrator

Annine Qvale (28 April 1963 – 27 November 2014) was a Norwegian children's writer and illustrator.

Annine Qvale was educated at the Oslo Art Academy (Oslo Tegne og Maleskole). She made her children's book debut in 2000 with Kastanjefolket. She was elected to the board of the Norwegian Writers for Children in 2012. Best known as an illustrator, she worked with Alf Prøysen's tales among others, and had a posthumous exhibition at Prøysenhuset at Rudshøgda in Ringsaker Municipality.

== Selected works ==
- Kastanjefolket (2000)
- Vår hos Kastanjefolket (2002)
- Formel og Pi (2004)
- Den store boken med eventyr (2005)
- Bokbærerne (2007)
- Den store Teskjekjerringboka (2010)
- Teskjekjerringa som prinsesse Pompadur (2011)
