= Ivar Lykke (architect) =

Norwegian architect (born 1941)

Ivar Lykke (born 9 April 1941) is a Norwegian architect.

He was born in Trondheim, and was a grandson of former Prime Minister Ivar Lykke. He graduated from the Norwegian Institute of Technology in 1965. He has worked in the architect firms 4 B Arkitekter from 1973 to 1990 and Linje Arkitekter from 2000. In between he headed the architect's office of the Norwegian State Railways. Here he was responsible for many projects, including refurbishment of the stations at Lysaker, Skøyen and Kambo.
