= Turtagrø =

Hotel in Luster, Norway

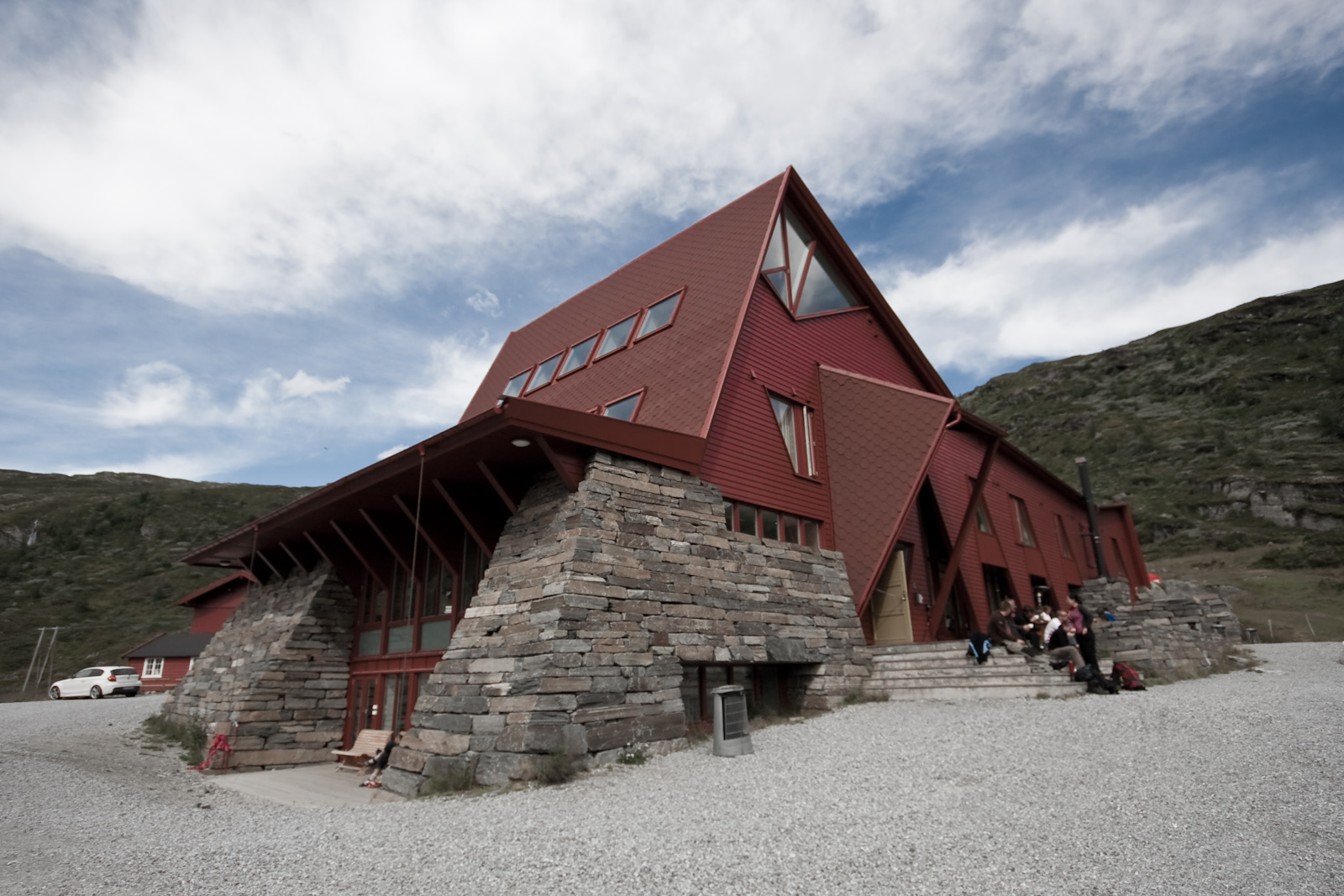
- Turtagrø, the new hotel building from 2002
- Interactive map of the Turtagrø area

General information
- Location: Luster Municipality, Norway
- Coordinates: 61.50441°N 7.80167°E
- Opening: 1888

Website
- www.turtagro.no

Turtagrø is a hotel in Luster Municipality in Vestland county, Norway. It lies just north of the Hurrungane range in the Jotunheimen mountains. The village of Fortun lies about 6 kilometres (3.7 mi) to the west and the village of Skjolden (at the end of the Sognefjorden) lies about 11 kilometres (6.8 mi) to the west. The hotel has been a central meeting place for mountaineers since the late 1800s.

== Location ==
Turtagrø is located near the old mountain route and current road Sognefjellsvegen, north of Hurrungane in Jotunheimen. It can be a starting point for hiking tours to Fannaråken, Skogadalsbøen and the peaks and ridges of Hurrungane, including climbing Storen, one of the tallest mountains in Norway.

== History ==
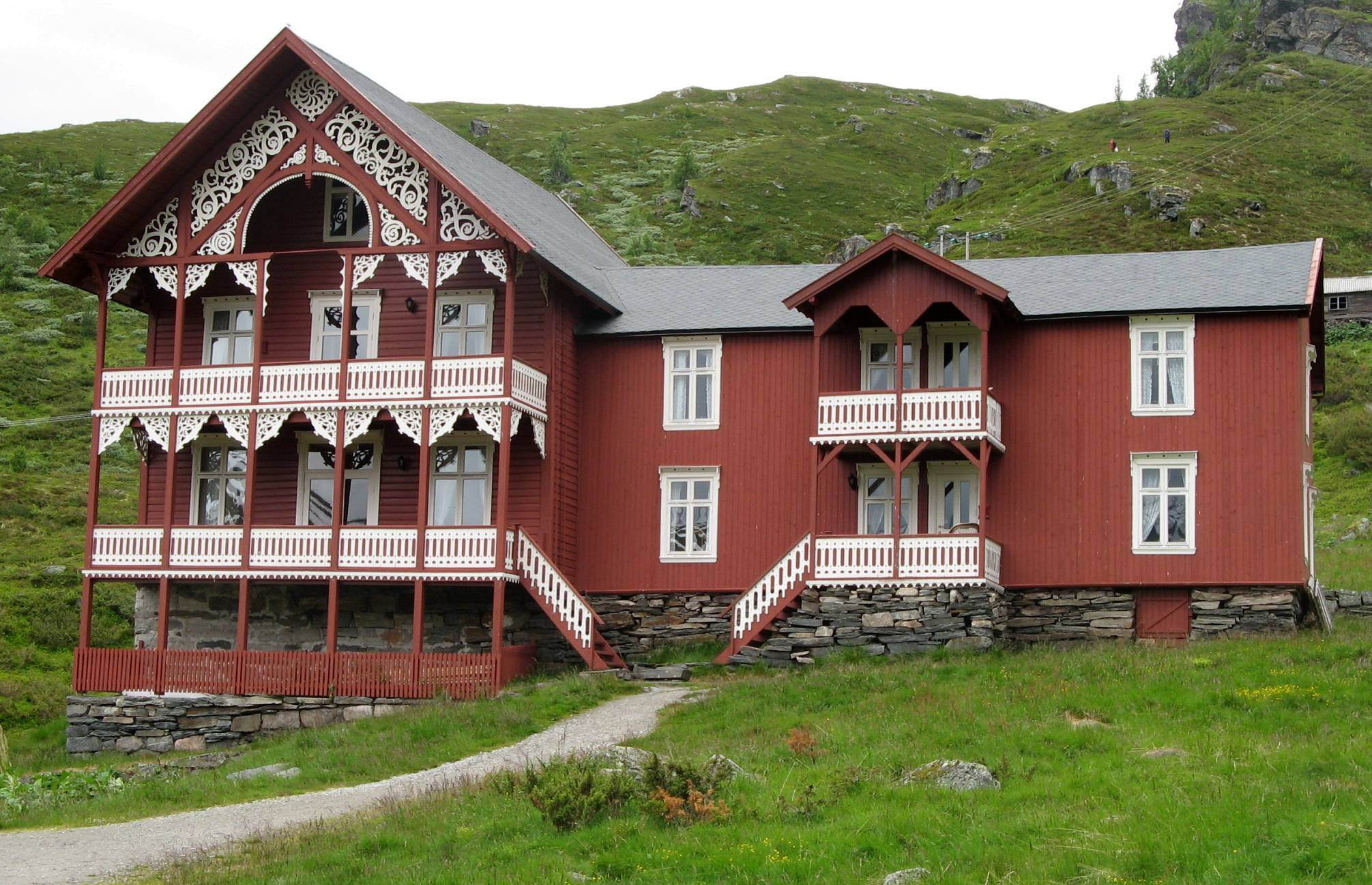
The old annex from 1888, (the hotel built by Øiene)

The first hotel at Turtagrø was built in 1888 by mountain guide Ola Berge. Later the same year a second hotel was built by Ole Øiene, only 100 metres apart. Turtagrø was a central meeting place for the pioneers of mountaineering in Jotunheimen from the late 1800s, and among the early visitors were William Cecil Slingsby, Howard Priestman and Carl Hall. The two hotels merged in 1911, when Berge bought the other hotel from Øiene. After Berge's death in 1928, his daughter Kari Berge was running the hotel. The road Sognefjellsvegen, which passes Turtagrø, was finished in 1938. In 1938 the climbing association Norsk Tindeklub also built their own cabin in Skagadalen, and these events eventually contributed to a change in Turtagrø's role and the type of visitors.

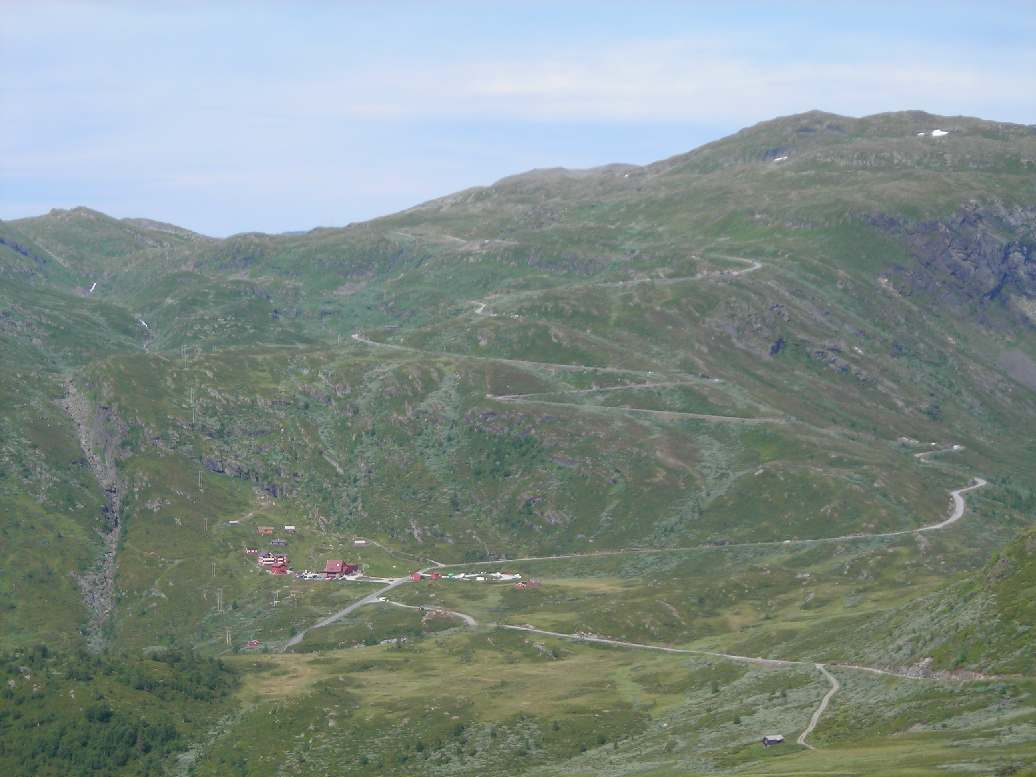
Turtagrø and Sognefjellsvegen.

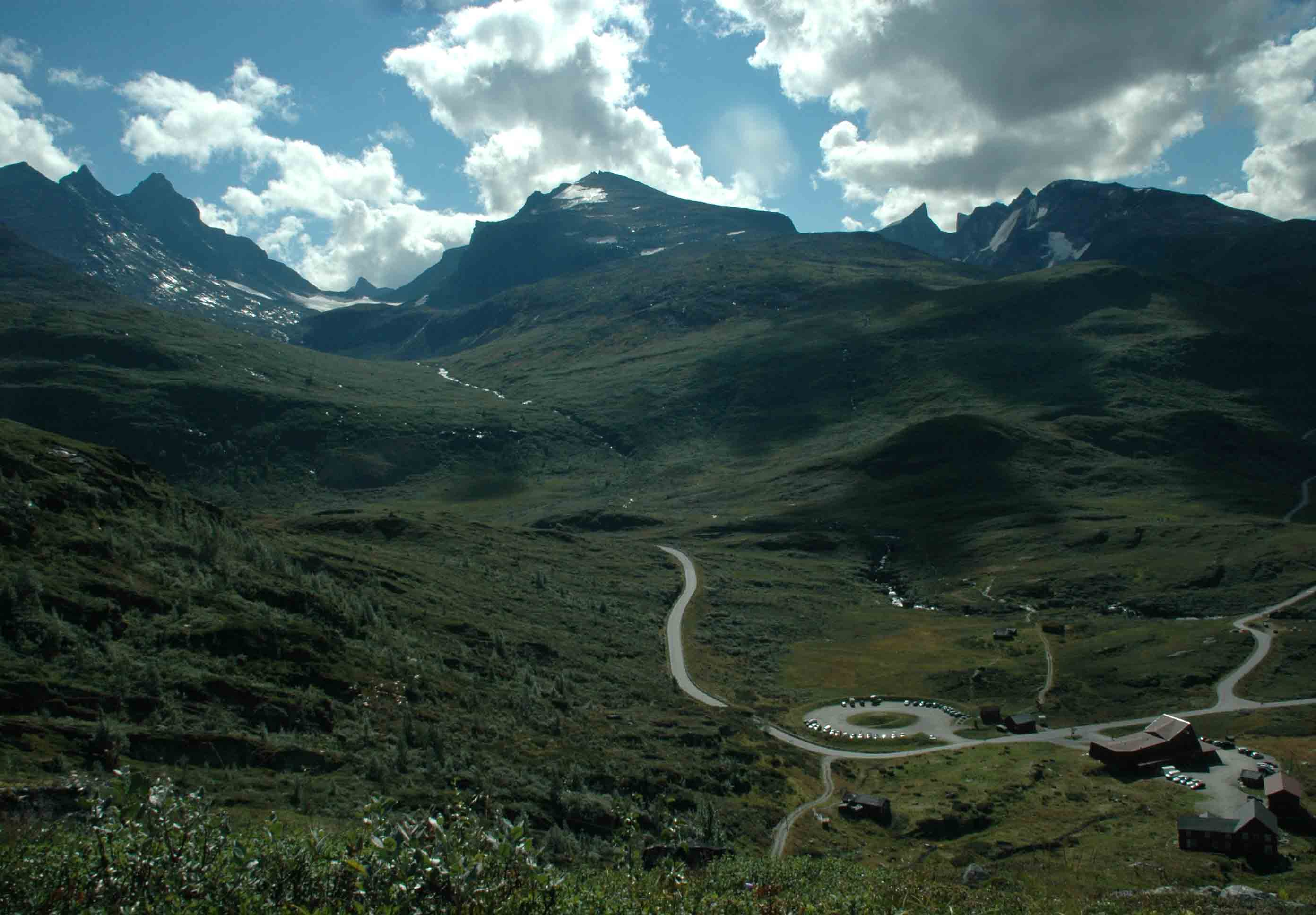
Skagadalen and Hurrungane, viewed from Turtagrø.

On 28 April 1940, during the closing days of the Norwegian Campaign in South Norway, German prisoners of war from the Norwegian 2nd Division's abandoned Lom prisoner of war camp and their guards arrived at Turtagrø. The prisoners and guards spent the night at Turtagrø on their way west to Vadheim in Sogn. The weakest of the prisoners were left under guard at the hotel, later to be retrieved by snow sleds.

From 1953 the hotel was run by Johannes Drægni. In 1962 Drægni established the first climbing school in Norway, Den Norske Klatreskole, at Turtagrø. The climbing school operated until 1975. Ole Berge Drægni was running the hotel from 1997. In 2001 the old main building burned down in a fire. A new hotel building opened in 2002. Ole Berge Drægni perished in the tsunami in Thailand in 2004, and his then four-year-old daughter Sofie inherited the majority of the stocks.

== Bibliography ==
- Mølmen, Øystein (1996). Krigen 1940–45 (in Norwegian). Lesjaskog: Ø. Mølmen. ISBN 82-993958-0-1.
- Thommessen; Skogheim; Kuyper (1995). Fra Rondslottet til Lodalskåpa (in Norwegian). Fagernes: Valdres Forlag. ISBN 82-7562-037-6.
- Lauritzen, Per Roger (1997). Hyttene i Jotunheimen (in Norwegian). Boksenteret. ISBN 82-7683-139-7.
