= Store Austanbottstind =

Mountain peak in Vestland, Norway

- Store Austanbotntind (unofficial)
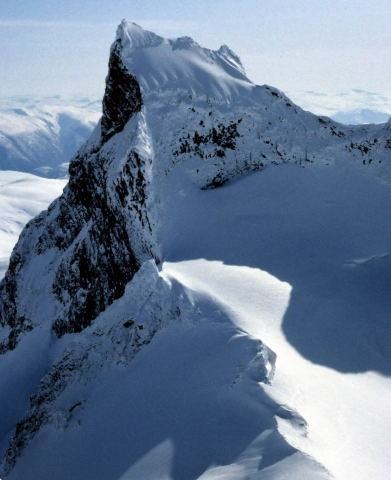
- Seen from Store Ringstind

Highest point
- Elevation: 2,203 m (7,228 ft)
- Prominence: 480 m (1,570 ft)
- Parent peak: Storen
- Isolation: 5.2 km (3.2 mi)
- Coordinates: 61°25′55″N 7°47′43″E

Geography
- Location: Vestland, Norway
- Parent range: Hurrungane
- Topo map: 1517 IV Hurrungane

Climbing
- First ascent: 1883: Carl Hall and Mathias Soggemoen
- Easiest route: Climbing

Store Austanbottstind is a mountain on the border of Luster Municipality and Årdal Municipality in Vestland county, Norway. It is the highest peak in the western part of the Hurrungane mountain range. The mountain is located in Jotunheimen National Park, about 12.5 kilometres (7.8 mi) southeast of the village of Skjolden. The easiest route to the summit involves climbing, though relatively easy, and crossing of an exposed snow flank.

yes

The nearby mountains Storen, Vetle Skagastølstindane, and Midtre Skagastølstindane are all located about 5.5 kilometres (3.4 mi) to the northeast of Store Austanbottstind.

== Name ==
The first element is the name of the Austanbotnen valley and the last element is the finite form of tind which means "mountain peak". The name of the valley is a compound of austan which means "eastern" and the finite form of botn which means "bottom" or "end of a valley".

== See also ==
- List of mountains of Norway
