= Fannaråki =

Mountain in Vestland, Norway

- Fannaråken (unofficial)
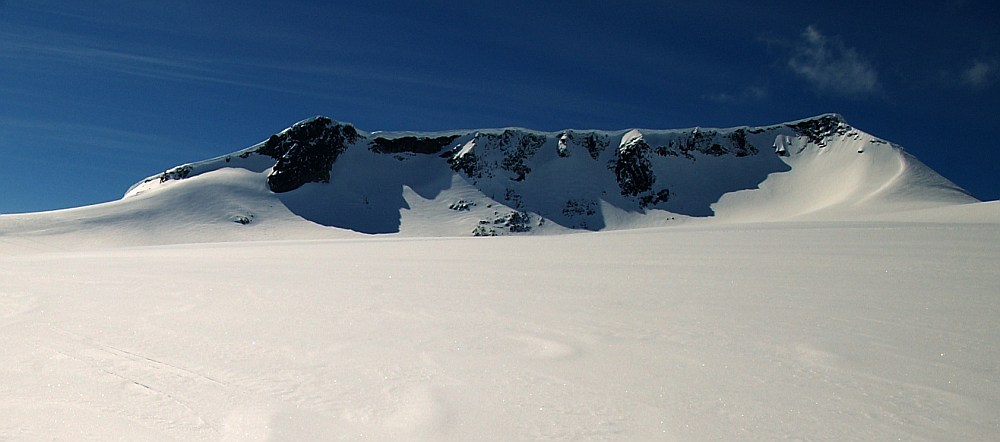
- Fannaråki seen from Fannaråkbreen (glacier) at the mountains northern base. Summit to the right.

Highest point
- Elevation: 2,068 m (6,785 ft)
- Prominence: 596 m (1,955 ft)
- Parent peak: Storen
- Isolation: 5.3 km (3.3 mi) to
- Coordinates: 61°31′00″N 7°54′30″E

Geography
- Location: Vestland, Norway
- Parent range: Hurrungane
- Topo map: 1518 III Sygnefjell

Fannaråki is a mountain in Luster Municipality in Vestland county, Norway. The 2,068-metre (6,785 ft) tall mountain is located in the Jotunheimen National Park, just south of the lake Prestesteinsvatnet and the Sognefjellsvegen road. This mountain is located about 6 kilometres (3.7 mi) north of the Skagastølstindane mountains (Storen, Vetle Skagastølstindane, Midtre Skagastølstindane, Sentraltind, Styggedalstindane, and Gjertvasstind).

== Name ==
The first element is derived from the word fonn which means "glacier made of snow" and the last element is the finite form of råk which means "mountain ridge".

== Guidebooks ==
- Dyer, Anthony; Baddeley, John; Robertson, Ian H. (2006). Walks and Scrambles in Norway. Rockbuy Limited. ISBN 9781904466253.
- Pollmann, Bernhard (2000). Norway South: Rother Walking Guide. Bergverlag Rudolf Rother. ISBN 9783763348077.
- Baxter, James. Scandinavian Mountains and Peaks Over 2000 Metres in the Hurrungane. Edinburgh: Scandinavian Publishing. ISBN 9780955049705.

== Climate ==
Climate data for Fannaråki, Norway (1932-2014)
Month	Jan	Feb	Mar	Apr	May	Jun	Jul	Aug	Sep	Oct	Nov	Dec	Year
Record high °C (°F)	1.9 (35.4)	1.2 (34.2)	6.7 (44.1)	6.9 (44.4)	12.8 (55.0)	18.5 (65.3)	17.2 (63.0)	16.9 (62.4)	12.2 (54.0)	11.5 (52.7)	3.8 (38.8)	2.5 (36.5)	18.5 (65.3)
Mean daily maximum °C (°F)	−8.7 (16.3)	−8.9 (16.0)	−7.2 (19.0)	−5.1 (22.8)	−0.4 (31.3)	3.2 (37.8)	5.3 (41.5)	4.6 (40.3)	0.9 (33.6)	−2.5 (27.5)	−5.7 (21.7)	−7.5 (18.5)	−2.6 (27.3)
Daily mean °C (°F)	−11.2 (11.8)	−11.5 (11.3)	−10.0 (14.0)	−8.0 (17.6)	−3.2 (26.2)	0.4 (32.7)	2.7 (36.9)	2.3 (36.1)	−1.2 (29.8)	−4.5 (23.9)	−7.9 (17.8)	−9.8 (14.4)	−5.2 (22.7)
Mean daily minimum °C (°F)	−13.4 (7.9)	−13.9 (7.0)	−12.4 (9.7)	−10.3 (13.5)	−5.6 (21.9)	−1.8 (28.8)	0.5 (32.9)	0.2 (32.4)	−3.1 (26.4)	−6.5 (20.3)	−10.0 (14.0)	−12.0 (10.4)	−7.4 (18.8)
Record low °C (°F)	−33.0 (−27.4)	−27.3 (−17.1)	−25.2 (−13.4)	−23.2 (−9.8)	−21.0 (−5.8)	−12.2 (10.0)	−8.2 (17.2)	−8.2 (17.2)	−13.0 (8.6)	−20.7 (−5.3)	−22.0 (−7.6)	−26.3 (−15.3)	−33.0 (−27.4)
Average precipitation mm (inches)	100.9 (3.97)	97.2 (3.83)	83.6 (3.29)	85.2 (3.35)	59.4 (2.34)	76.1 (3.00)	108.4 (4.27)	117.2 (4.61)	113.2 (4.46)	101.9 (4.01)	103.2 (4.06)	114.4 (4.50)	1,160.6 (45.69)
Average precipitation days (≥ 1 mm)	17.2	15.2	15.4	15.2	12.8	14.0	17.4	16.7	17.4	18.0	18.6	19.4	197.4
Average relative humidity (%)	85.6	85.0	82.4	86.3	86.4	85.9	87.8	87.8	89.3	86.4	86.4	87.6	86.4
Source: Norwegian Meteorological Institute
