= 2014 in Norwegian music =

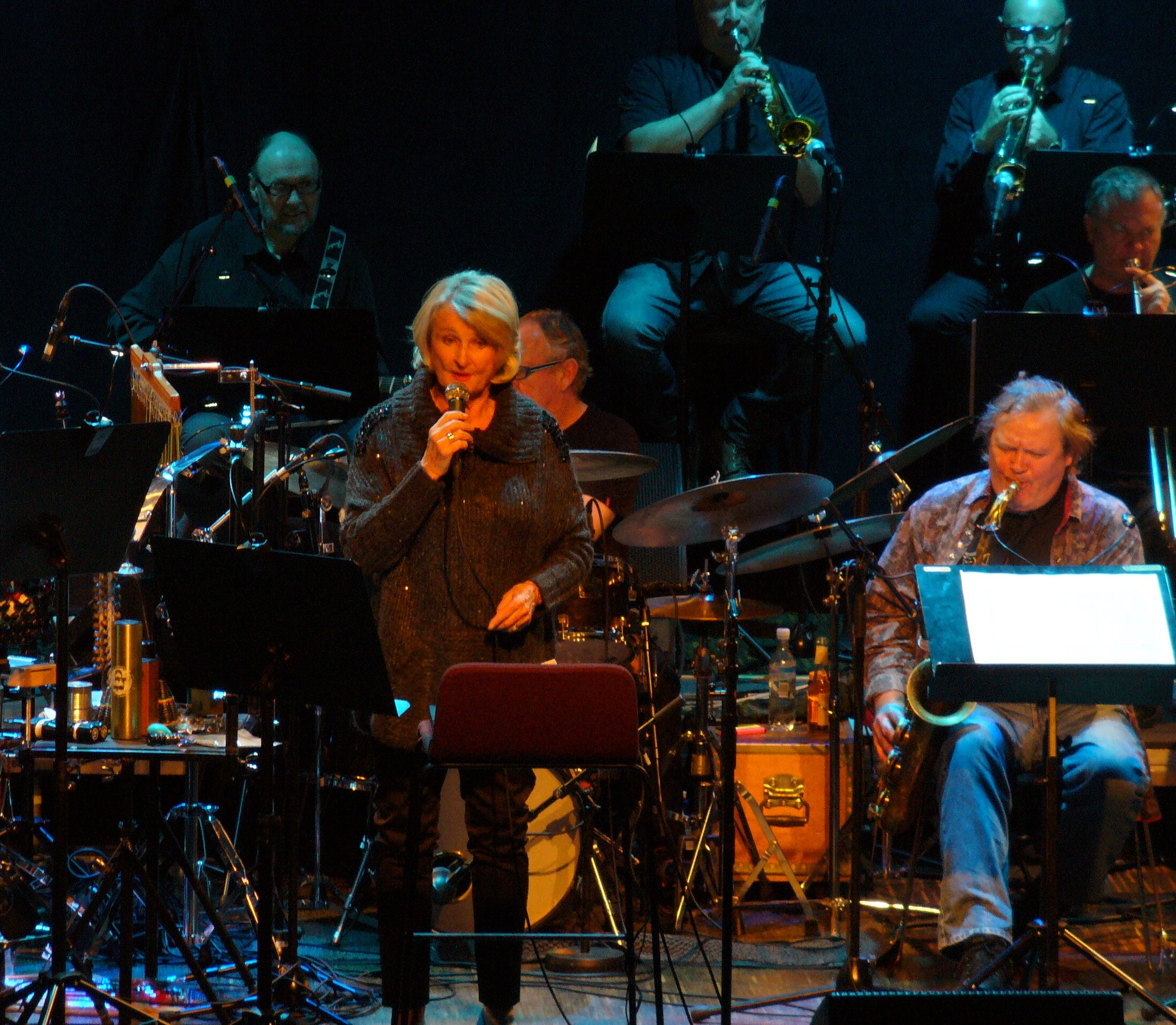
Karin Krog with Bergen Big Band at the memorial concert remembering Olav Dale at Verftet in Bergen.

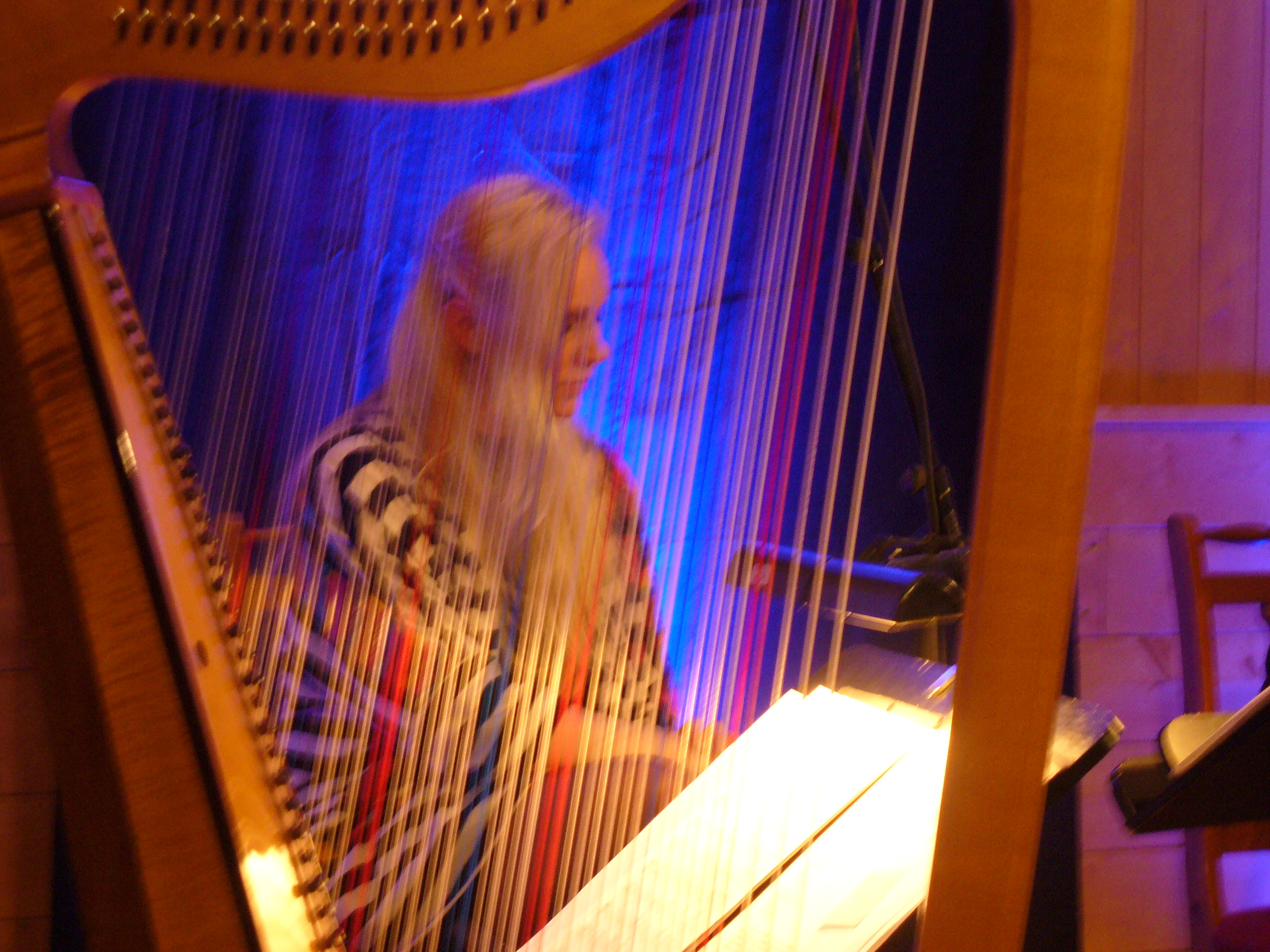
Susanna Wallumrød with Giovanna Pessi at Vossajazz, April 2014.

The following is a list of notable events and releases of the year 2014 in Norwegian music.

== Events ==
=== January ===
- 9 – The 13th All Ears festival started in Oslo (January 9 – 12).
- 16 – Ice Music Festival 2014 started in Geilo (January 16–19).
- 22 – Bodø Jazz Open started in Bodø (January 22–26).
- 24
  - Nordlysfestivalen started in Tromsø (January 24 – February 2).
  - Anne-Lise Sollied Allemano (soprano) was awarded the Nordlysprisen 2014 at Nordlysfestivalen.
- 30 – Kristiansund Opera Festival opened (January 30 – February 15).

=== February ===
- 5 – The Polarjazz Festival 2014 started in Longyearbyen (February 5 – 9).

=== March ===
- 14 – Narvik Winter Festival started (March 14 – 23).

=== April ===
- 3 – Tape to Zero started at Victoria, National jazz scene in Oslo (April 3 – 4).
- 11 – Vossajazz started at Vossavangen (April 11–13).
- 12
  - Sigbjørn Apeland was awarded Vossajazzprisen 2014.
  - Mats Eilertsen performed the commissioned work Rubicon for Vossajazz 2014.
- 16 – Inferno Metal Festival 2014 started in Oslo (April 16–19).
- 23 – SoddJazz 2014 started in Inderøy Municipality, Nord-Trøndelag (April 23–27).

=== May ===
- 6 – Norway participated at the Eurovision Song Contest (May 6 – 10).
- 21 – The Festspillene i Bergen started (May 21 – June 4).
- 22 – Nattjazz started in Bergen (May 22 – 31)

=== June ===
- 10 – Norwegian Wood 2014 started in Oslo (June 10–14).
- 11 – Bergenfest started in Bergen (June 11–15).
- 21 – Festspillene i Nord-Norge started in Harstad (June 21–28).

=== July ===
- 2 – Kongsberg Jazzfestival started at Kongsberg (July 2–5).
- 5 – Mathias Eick was recipient of the Kongsberg Jazz Award or DNB.prisen 2014 at the Kongsberg Jazzfestival.
- 10 – The Stavernfestivalen started in Stavern (July 10–12).
- 14 – Moldejazz started in Molde with Sidsel Endresen as artist in residence (July 14–19).
- 15 – Monkey Plot was awarded the JazzIntro 2014.
- 31 – The 27th Notodden Blues Festival started in Notodden (July 31 – August 3).

=== August ===
- 11 – Oslo Jazzfestival started in Oslo (August 11–16).
- 12 – Odd André Elveland was recipient of the Ella-prisen 2014 at the Oslo Jazzfestival.

=== September ===
- 4 – The Punktfestivalen started in Kristiansand (September 4–6).
- 10 – Ultima Oslo Contemporary Music Festival 2014 starts in Oslo (September 10–20).
- 17 – Nordic Music Days 2014 started in Oslo (September 17–20), hosted by the Ultima Oslo Contemporary Music Festival for the Norwegian Society of Composers.

=== October ===
- 17 – The Ekkofestival started in Bergen (October 17–25).
- 20 – The Asker Jazz Festival started in Asker Municipality (October 20–26).
- 23 – The Insomnia Festival started in Tromsø (October 23–26).

=== November ===
- 12 – The Vardø Blues Festival (Blues i Vintermørket) started (November 12 – 15).
- 13 – The 9th Barents Jazz, Tromsø International Jazz Festival started (November 13 – 15).

=== December ===
- 11 – The Nobel Peace Prize Concert was held at Telenor Arena.

== Albums released ==
=== January ===
Day	Album	Artist	Label	Notes	Ref.
6	Fly North	Jan Gunnar Hoff	Losen Records		
10	Chron	Arve Henriksen	Rune Grammofon		
17	Extended Circle	Tord Gustavsen Quartet	ECM Records	Produced by Manfred Eicher	
27	Valencia	Hildegunn Øiseth	Losen Records		

=== February ===
Day	Album	Artist	Label	Notes	Ref.
7	Acres Of Blue	Espen Berg	Atterklang	AKLANG308	

=== March ===
Day	Album	Artist	Label	Notes	Ref.
7	Behind The Sun	Motorpsycho with Reine Fiske	Rune Grammofon		
28	Maelstrom	Stian Westerhus & Pale Horses	Rune Grammofon		

=== April ===
Day	Album	Artist	Label	Notes	Ref.
7	Chet På Norsk / Ei Som Deg	Baker Hansen	NorCD		
11	Enfant Terrible	Hedvig Mollestad Trio	Rune Grammofon		
25	Lion	Marius Neset	ACT Music		

=== May ===
Day	Album	Artist	Label	Notes	Ref.
16	Forever Young	Jacob Young	ECM Records	Produced by Manfred Eicher	

=== August ===
Day	Album	Artist	Label	Notes	Ref.
15	Touchstone For Manu	Manu Katché feat. Jan Garbarek, Tomasz Stanko, Tore Brunborg, Nils Petter Molvær, Mathias Eick, Trygve Seim	ECM	Produced by Manfred Eicher	
22	The Nature Of Connections	Arve Henriksen	Rune Grammofon		

=== September ===
Day	Album	Artist	Label	Notes	Ref.
19	Som Spor	Karl Seglem	NorCD		

=== October ===
Day	Album	Artist	Label	Notes	Ref.
3	Universal Cycle	Eple Trio	Shipwreckords		
17	Innocent Play	Bjørn Alterhaug Quintet	Ponca Jazz Records		
17	Skogenes Sang	In the Country & Frida Ånnevik	Grappa Music		
24	Lumen Drones	Lumen Drones (Nils Økland, Per Steinar Lie, Ørjan Haaland)	ECM		
24	A Passion For John Donne	Ketil Bjørnstad	ECM Records		
24	World Of Glass	Terje Isungset & Arve Henriksen	All Ice Records		

=== November ===
Day	Album	Artist	Label	Notes	Ref.
1	Kryssande	Gisle Torvik and Hardanger Big Band	NorCD		
7	Bonita	Sidsel Endresen & Stian Westerhus	Rune Grammofon		
7	Night Owl	Albatrosh	Rune Grammofon		
10	Trademark	Christer Fredriksen	Losen Records		
21	Diving	Ellen Andrea Wang	Propeller Recordings		
24	Lumen Drones	Lumen Drones (Ørjan Haaland, Nils Økland, Per Steinar Lie)	ECM Records	Produced by Manfred Eicher	
28	Feeling // Emotion	Kristoffer Eikrem & Kjetil Jerve	NorCD		

=== December ===
Day	Album	Artist	Label	Notes	Ref.
5	Den Tredje Dagen	Parallax	NorCD		

=== Unknown date ===
#

M

- Switch by Nils Petter Molvær (Okhe).

== New Artists ==
- Emilie Nicolas received the Spellemannprisen award, as 'Best newcomer of the year 2014', for the album Like I’m A Warrior and was with that also recipient of the Gramo grant.
- Monkey Plot was awarded the 2014 JazzIntro at the Moldejazz, July 15, 2014.

== Deaths ==
January

- 6 – Thor Hilmersen, rock guitarist (born 1946).
- 15
  - Per Eirik Johansen, rock singer and music manager (born 1959)
  - Aage Teigen, jazz trombonist (born 1944)

May

- 23 – Per Gunnar Jensen, pop singer (born 1928)

August

- 15 – Svein Nymo, traditional folk violinist and composer (born 1953).
- 19 – Kåre Kolberg, contemporary classical composer (born 1936).
- 23 – Inga Juuso, yoiker, Sami singer, and actress (born 1945).
- 29 – Jan Groth, rock singer (Aunt Mary, Just 4 Fun), cancer (born 1946).

October

- 10 – Olav Dale, jazz saxophonist, composer, and orchestra leader (born 1958).
- 22 – Almar Heggen (81), opera singer (born 1933).

December

- 8 – Knut Nystedt, contemporary classical composer (born 1915).
- 12 – John Persen, Sami composer (born 1941).

== See also ==
- 2014 in Norway
- Music of Norway
- Norway in the Eurovision Song Contest 2014
- Spellemannprisen
