= 1936 in Nordic music =

The following is a list of notable events and compositions of the year 1936 in Nordic music.

== Events ==
- Summer – Eric Bengtson and Axel Gauffin co-found the Midnight Concerts at the National Museum in Stockholm.
- October – Danish tenor Aksel Schiøtz gives his first lieder recital.
- unknown date
  - The Icelandic Singers (later the Reykjavik Male Choir) go on tour in North America for the first time.

== New works ==
- John Fernström – Clarinet Concerto
- Uuno Klami – Psalmus
- Lars-Erik Larsson – Prinsessan av Cypern (opera)

== Popular music ==
- Karl Olof Lagerkrans – "Kan du tänka dig honom utan hår?"
- Aage Stentoft & Poul Sørensen – "Ditt hjerte er i fare Andresen"

== Births ==
- 28 April – John Tchicai, Danish jazz musician and composer (died 2012)
- 11 May – Kåre Kolberg, Norwegian organist, composer and music critic (died 2014)
- 25 October – Alf Cranner, Norwegian folk singer (died 2020)

== Deaths ==
- 22 January – Louis Glass, Danish composer (born 1864)
- 4 March – Ruben Liljefors, Swedish conductor and composer (born 1871)
- 15 April – Hilda Sehested, Danish composer (born 1858)
- 22 October – Hedevig Quiding, Danish singer and music critic (born 1867)
- 8 December – Jakob Hveding Sletten, Norwegian priest and musician (born 1872)
- 14 December – Sven Scholander, Swedish musician, singer, composer and sculptor (born 1860)
- 24 December – Paul Knutsen Barstad Sandvik, Norwegian organist and teacher (born 1847)
- 27 December – Heikki Suolahti, Finnish composer (born 1920; peritonitis)

== See also ==
- 1936 in Denmark
- 1936 in Iceland
- 1936 in Norwegian music
- 1936 in Sweden
