= Gjendine Slålien =

Norwegian folk signer

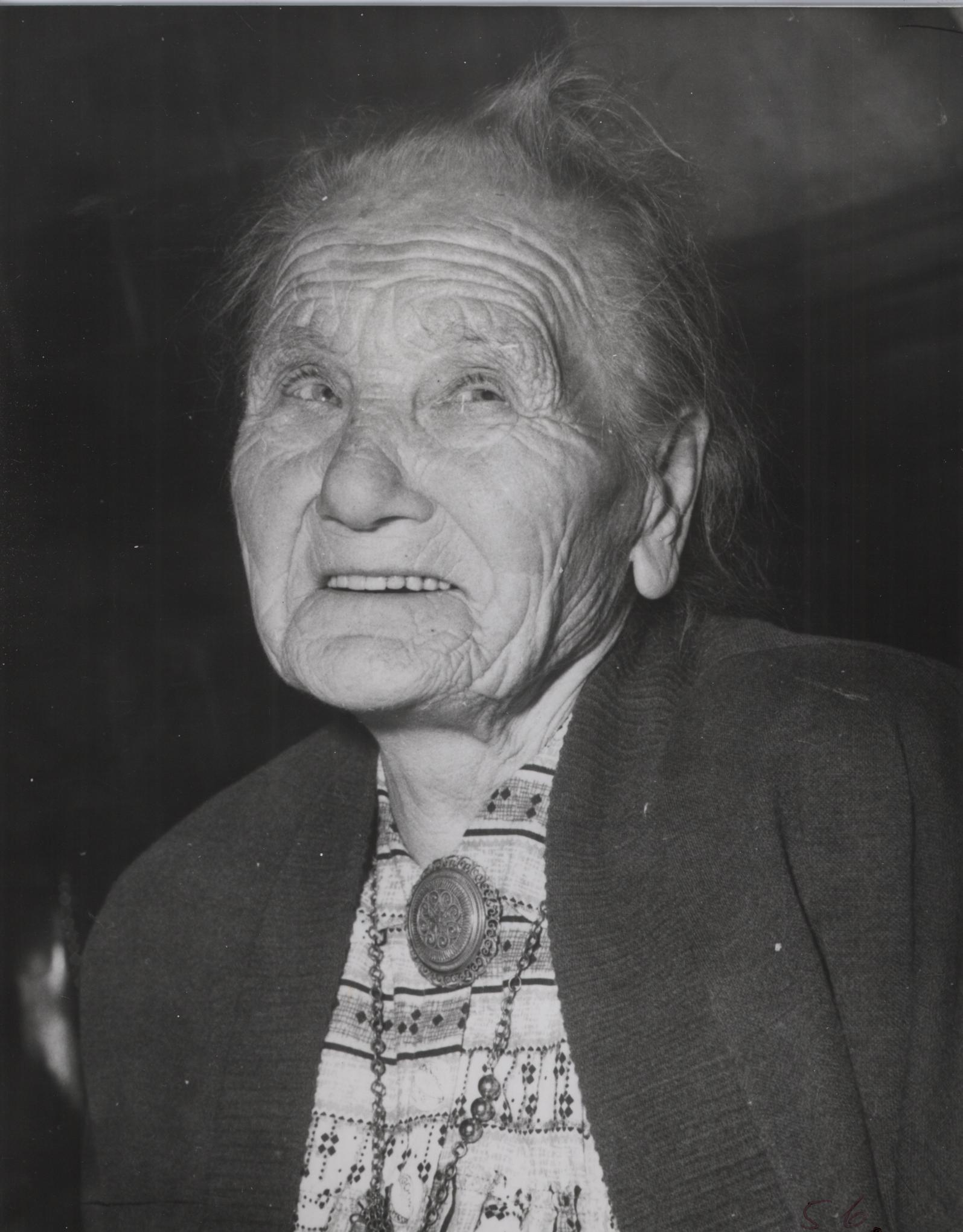
Gjendine Slålien

Kaia Gjendine Slålien (1871–1972) was a Norwegian dairy maid and folk singer who inspired Edvard Grieg and his friends with her folk songs. They first visited her in 1891 at Skogadalsbøen, her mountain homestead in Vestland, returning on several occasions. Grieg's lullaby "Gjendines bådnlåt" was included in his Opus 66 "19 Norwegian Folk Songs". Gjendine Slålien became increasingly famous as she grew older, receiving visits from Queen Wilhelmina of the Netherlands, with whom she maintained a correspondence. On the occasion of her 90th birthday, she was invited to the Bergen Festival where she met King Olav.

== Early life and family ==
She was born in the stone mountain house Gjendebu in the Bøverdal valley of Lom Municipality. Kaia Gjendine Slålien was the daughter of the farmer Eirik A. Slålien (1829–1915) and his wife Anne née Syversdatter (1837–1924). She was named Gjendine after the family's summer pasture and was baptized in the stone house by the parish priest Honoratus Halling when she was just ten days old. She married the farm worker and tour guide Halvor Olsen Slålien (1873–1957) who also played the fiddle. She learned most of the folk songs she sang from her mother and her grandfather.

== Recognition as a folk singer ==
As a young girl, Gjendine spent the summers at Gjendebu with her father but later tended the mountain flocks alone or with the owners of the mountain farms at Skogadalsbøen. It was here in 1891 when she was 20 years old that she met Edvard Grieg who was hiking in the mountains with his friends Frants Beyer and the Dutch composer Julius Röntgen. The guests soon began to note down a number of the tunes she sang from her extensive repertoire. When they continued on their hike the next day, she bid them farewell on her bukkehorn. Grieg included the motif in his Op. 57, Hjemve.

When Grieg and Röntgen returned three years later, Röntgen, recently widowed, ask her to marry him, but she refused on the grounds that she would not be happy in the Netherlands. The two continued to visit her frequently. In 1907, shortly before he died, Grieg visited her together with Beyer and Röntgen for the last time.

Other composers and folk music collectors continued to visit her, especially in the 1920s. Among these were Ole Mørk Sandvik and Sparre Olsen who included several of Gjendine's songs in his Norske folkeviser fra Gudbrandsdalen.

Gjendine Slålien remained active and in good health for the rest of her life but in the spring of 1972, she suddenly became ill and was taken to the nursing home in Lom. She died there a few days later on 6 May 1972, over 100 years old.
