= Styggedalstindane =

Mountain in Vestland, Norway

- Store Styggedalstinden (unofficial)
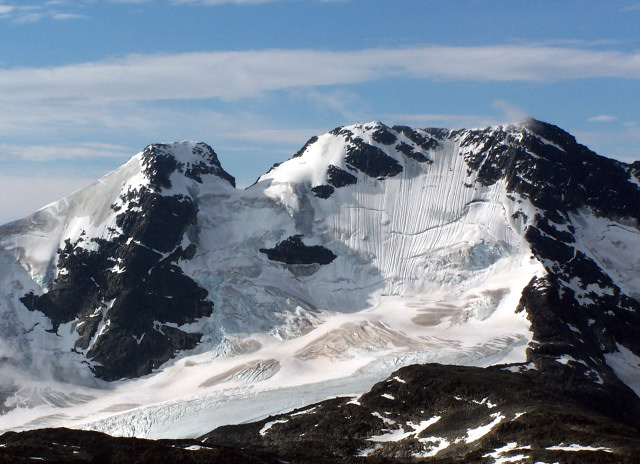
- Styggedalstind to the right. Gjertvasstind on the left. Seen from Fannaråki.

Highest point
- Elevation: 2,387 m (7,831 ft)
- Prominence: 170 m (560 ft)
- Parent peak: Storen
- Isolation: 1.7 km (1.1 mi)
- Listing: 4 at List of mountains in Norway by height
- Coordinates: 61°27′39″N 7°53′51″E

Geography
- Location: Vestland, Norway
- Parent range: Jotunheimen
- Topo map: 1517 IV Hurrungane

Climbing
- First ascent: 6 August 1883: Carl Christian Hall and Mathias Soggemoen
- Easiest route: Hiking and ice climbing

Styggedalstindane is the fourth-highest summit in Norway. It is located within the Hurrungane mountains, which are part of the Jotunheimen mountain range. The mountain is located in the eastern part of Luster Municipality in Vestland county, Norway. This mountain sits directly between the mountains Sentraltind and Gjertvasstind.

There are two summits on the mountain:

- The eastern summit is 2,387 metres (7,831 ft), with a primary factor of 170 metres (560 ft)
- The western summit is 300 metres (980 ft) away from the eastern summit, and it is 2,370 metres (7,780 ft), with a primary factor of 37 metres (121 ft).

== Name ==
The first element of the name is the genitive form of the valley name Styggedalen and the last element is the finite form of tind which means "mountain peak'. The name of the valley is a compound of stygg which means "ugly" or "bad" and the finite form of dal which means "dale" or "valley".

== Climbing ==
The ascent is relatively challenging. There are three possibilities, in increasing order of difficulty:

- Climb via Gjertvasstind (Norway's 12th-highest peak), originating in Skogadalsbøen
- Traverse the Gjertvassbreen glacier and climb from there
- Climb all the peaks from Storen (Norway's third highest peak at 2,405 m or 7,890 ft) across to the summit—the so-called Styggedal traverse. It is a multi-day trek across Storen, Vetle Skagastølstindane (18th-highest peak at 2,340 m or 7,680 ft), Sentraltind (13th-highest peak at 2,348 m or 7,703 ft), the eastern and then western summits of Styggedalstindane, and then descending from Gjertvasstind (12th-highest peak at 2,351 m or 7,713 ft)—bagging 6 of Norway's 20 tallest peaks in one trip.

== See also ==
- List of mountains of Norway
