= Midtre Skagastølstindane =

Mountain in Vestland, Norway

- Midtre Skarstølstindane
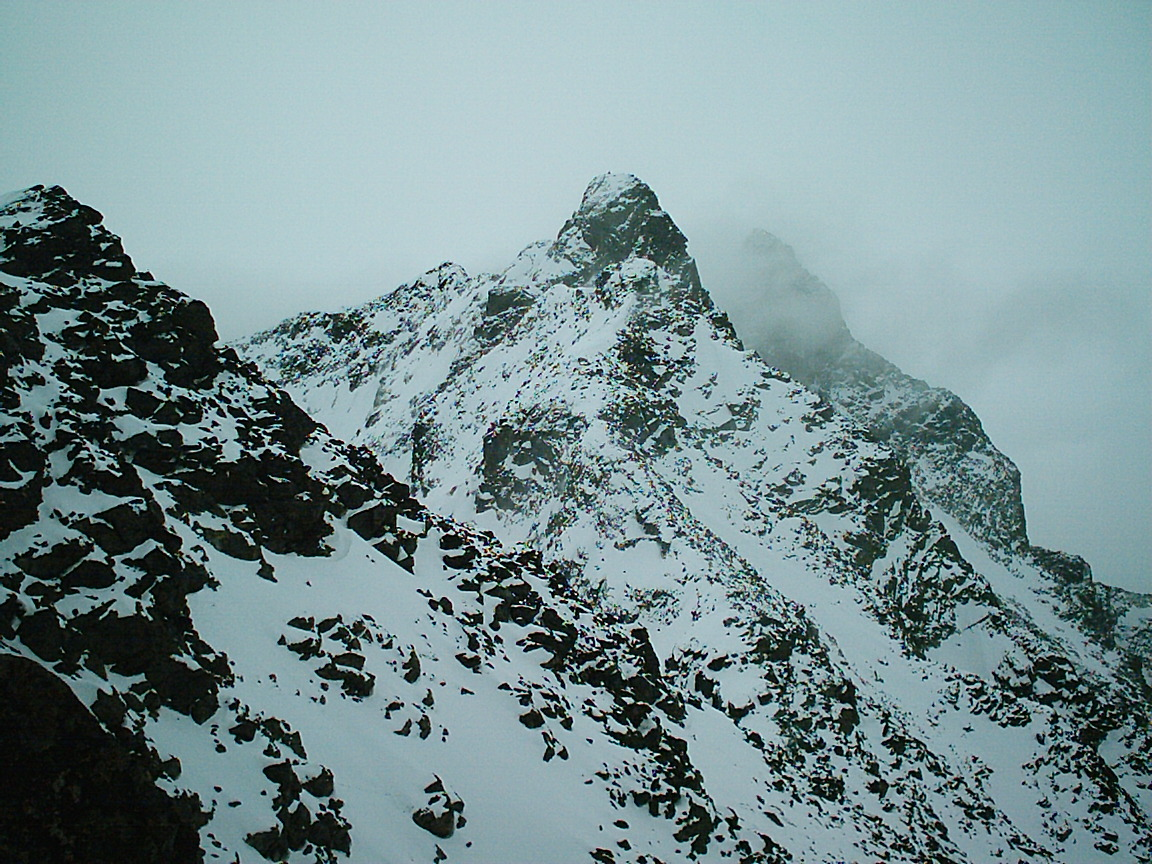

Highest point
- Elevation: 2,284 m (7,493 ft)
- Prominence: 80 m (260 ft)
- Parent peak: Storen
- Isolation: 0.374 km (0.232 mi)
- Coordinates: 61°28′05″N 7°52′08″E

Geography
- Location: Vestland, Norway
- Parent range: Hurrungane
- Topo map: 1517 IV Hurrungane

Climbing
- First ascent: 8 August 1884, Carl Christian Hall and Mathias Soggemoen

Midtre Skagastølstindane is one of the peaks constituting Skagastølstindane (lit. 'Skagastøl peaks') in the Hurrungane mountain range. The 2,284-metre (7,493 ft) tall mountain lies in the eastern part of Luster Municipality in Vestland county, Norway. The mountain lies in between Nordre Skagastølstindane, Vetle Skagastølstindane, and Storen. The mountains Styggedalstindane, Gjertvasstind, and Sentraltind all lie about 1 to 2 kilometres (0.62 to 1.24 mi) to the east of this mountain. The village of Skjolden lies about 15 kilometres (9.3 mi) to the west.

== Name ==
The first element is the genitive of the name of the mountain farm Skagastølen and the last element is tind which means "mountain peak". The mountain farm (dairy farm) Skagastølen belongs to the farm Skagen in Luster Municipality and stølen is the finite form of støl which means "mountain farm". Skagen is the finite form of skage which means "headland" or "promontory" and the name is equivalent with the famous Skagen in Denmark. The word midtre means "the one in the middle".
