= 1946 in Norwegian music =

The following is a list of notable events and releases of the year 1946 in Norwegian music.

== Events ==
=== September ===
- 1 – Kringkastingsorkestret, KORK, (Norwegian Radio Orchestra) was founded.

=== Unknown date ===
- The jazz club Kristiansands Rytmeklubb was established in Kristiansand.

== Deaths ==
April

- 30 – Olav Gunnarsson Helland, Hardanger fiddle maker (born 1875).

== Births ==
January

- 31 – Knut Lystad, actor, singer, translator, screenwriter, comedian, and director.

February

- 9 – Georg Kajanus, composer and pop guitarist, singer and songwriter (Sailor).
- 17 – Helge Jordal, actor and singer.
- 25 – Jan Groth, singer, Aunt Mary, Just 4 Fun, cancer (died 2014).

March

- 16 – Sigmund Groven, classical harmonica player.

April

- 14 – Knut Kristiansen, jazz pianist, composer and orchestra leader.
- 16 – Ivar Antonsen, jazz pianist and composer.
- 24 – Thor Hilmersen, rock guitarist (died 2014).

May

- 9 – Harald Sæther, composer.
- 16 – Olav Anton Thommessen, contemporary composer.

June

- 10 – Arild Engh, drummer, Ole Ivars (died 2017).

August

- 14 – Bjørn Kruse, saxophonist, composer, and painter.

September

- 12 – Ole A. Sørli, musician, writer, and record producer (died 2009).

October

- 18 – Sverre Kjelsberg, singer and bassist (died 2016).

November

- 23 – Agnes Buen Garnås, traditional folk singer.

December

- 7 – Kirsti Sparboe, singer and actress.

== See also ==
- 1946 in Norway
- Music of Norway
