= Prestesteinsvatnet =

Lake in Innlandet, Norway

- Presteinvatnet (historic)
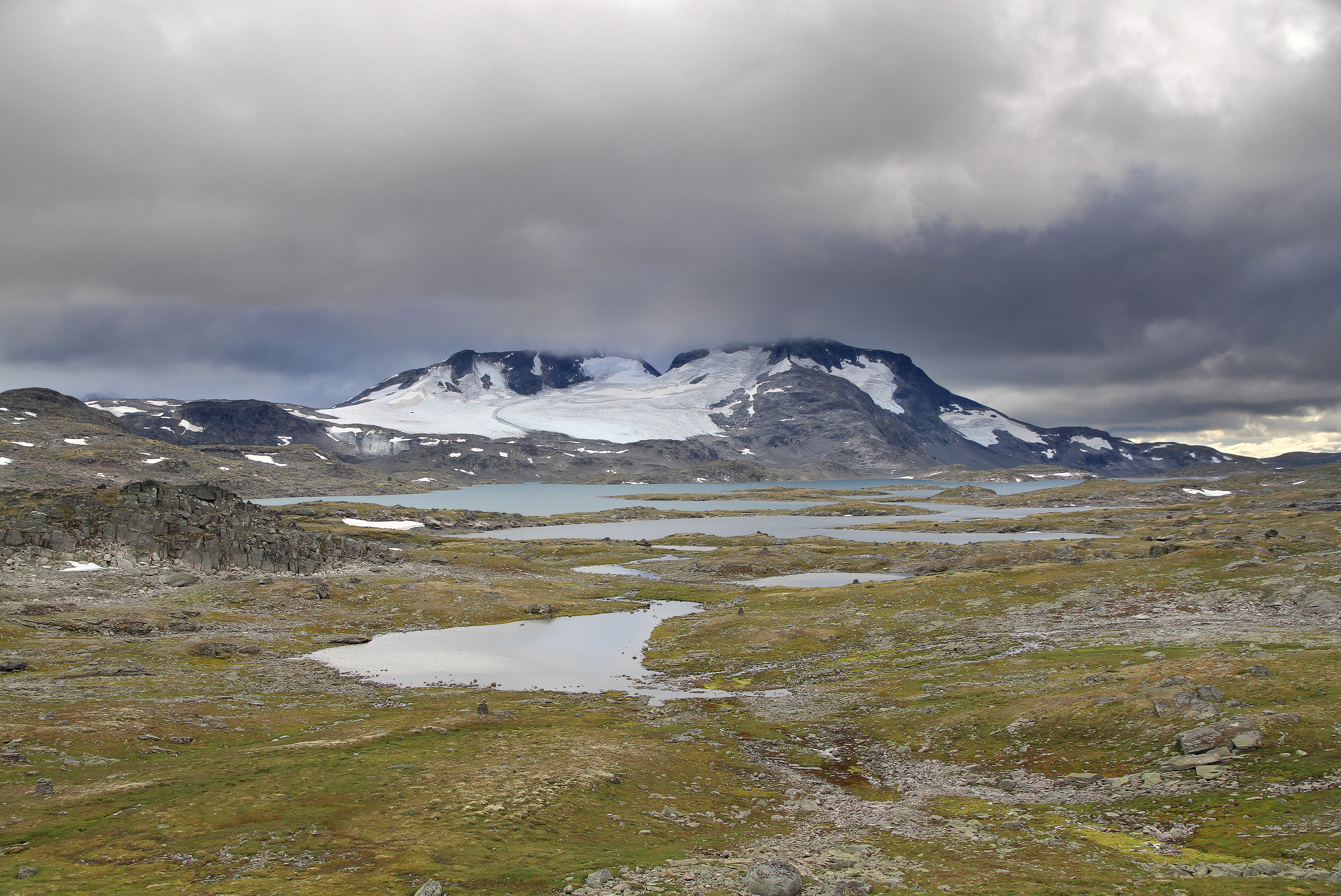
- Interactive map of the lake
- Location: Luster Municipality, Vestland and Lom Municipality, Innlandet
- Coordinates: 61°32′32″N 07°56′47″E
- Basin countries: Norway
- Surface area: 4.12 km^{2} (1.59 sq mi)
- Shore length^{1}: 20.42 kilometres (12.69 mi)
- Surface elevation: 1,357 metres (4,452 ft)
- References: NVE
- ^{1} Shore length is not a well-defined measure.

Prestesteinsvatnet (Urban East Norwegian: [ˈprɛ̂stəstæɪnˌvɑtnə]) is a lake in Luster Municipality in Vestland county, Norway, with a small part of the lake crossing over into the neighboring Lom Municipality in Innlandet county. The 4.12-square-kilometre (1,020-acre) lake sits at an elevation of 1,357 metres (4,452 ft) above sea level. It lies along the south side of the Sognefjellsvegen road, just to the north of the mountain Fannaråki and the Fannaråkbreen glacier. The lake sits just outside the borders of Jotunheimen National Park. The village of Skjolden lies about 20 kilometres (12 mi) to the southwest of the lake.

== See also ==
- List of lakes in Norway
