= 1936 in Norwegian music =

The following is a list of notable events and releases of the year 1936 in Norwegian music.

== Deaths ==
April

- 8 – Alfred Paulsen, composer (born 1849).

December

- 8 – Jakob Hveding Sletten, priest and musician (born 1872).
- 24 – Paul Knutsen Barstad Sandvik, organist and teacher (born 1847).

== Births ==
May

- 11 – Kåre Kolberg, composer, organist and music critic (died 2014).

September

- 17 – Rolv Wesenlund, comedian, singer, clarinetist, writer and actor (died 2013).

August

- 1 – Helge Hurum, jazz musician, composer, arranger and musical director.

October

- 25 – Alf Cranner, folk singer, lyricist and painter (died 2020).

December

- 14 – Arve Tellefsen, violinist.

== See also ==
- 1936 in Norway
- Music of Norway
