= Norwegian Folk Music Research Association =

Folk music society based in Norway

Norwegian Folk Music Research Association (Norwegian: Norsk Folkemusikklag) is a folk music society based in Trondheim, Norway.

It was founded in 1948. The first president was Ole Mørk Sandvik, who sat until 1965. It organizes annual seminars and publishes the yearbook Musikk og tradisjon (Music and tradition). It is a member body of the International Council for Traditional Music (formerly: the International Folk Music Council).

The current president is Bjørn Aksdal, and board members are Maj Vester Larsen, Per Åsmund Omholt, Sveinung Søyland Moen and Anne Svånaug Blengsdalen.
