= Mathias Soggemoen =

Norwegian railway worker, mountain climbing pioneer and guide

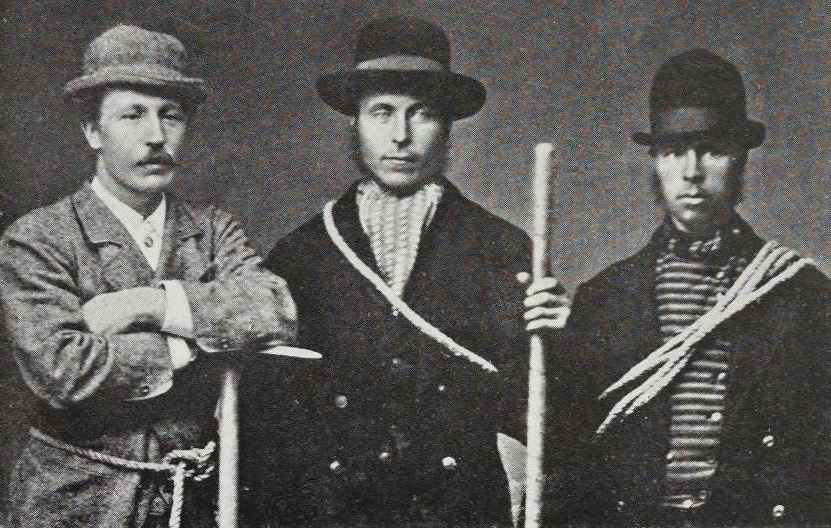
- Hall Norahagen Soggemoen
- Born: 5 October 1847; Grytten Municipality, Norway
- Died: 1929 (aged 81–82)
- Occupations: Railway worker, mountain climbing pioneer and guide
- Known for: A number of first ascents of Norwegian mountains

Mathias Soggemoen (5 October 1847 – 1929) was a Norwegian railway worker, mountain climbing pioneer, and mountain climbing guide.

Mathias Johnsen Soggemoen was born the oldest of seven siblings in Grytten Municipality (in the present-day Rauma Municipality) in Romsdalen county, Norway. In 1875, he married Ingeborg Olsdatter Sogge Brekken and settled at the village of Veblungsnes. They were the parents of nine children. Later in life, Mathias and Ingeborg Soggemoen emigrated to America with several of their children.

Soggemoen is known for a number of first ascents of Norwegian mountains. Among his first ascents are Store Austanbotntind (1883, with Carl Hall), Store Styggedalstinden (1883, with Hall), Midtre Skagastølstind (1884, with Hall), Hjelledalstind (1884, with Hall), Storebjørn (1884, with Hall), and Sentraltind (1885, with Hall and Torger S. Sulheim). He also climbed Romsdalshornet in 1881.

In 1886 Soggemoen and Hall made the first known ascent of the 2,189-metre (7,182 ft) tall Saksi
