= Sentraltind =

Mountain in Norway

- Vestre Styggedalstind (unofficial)
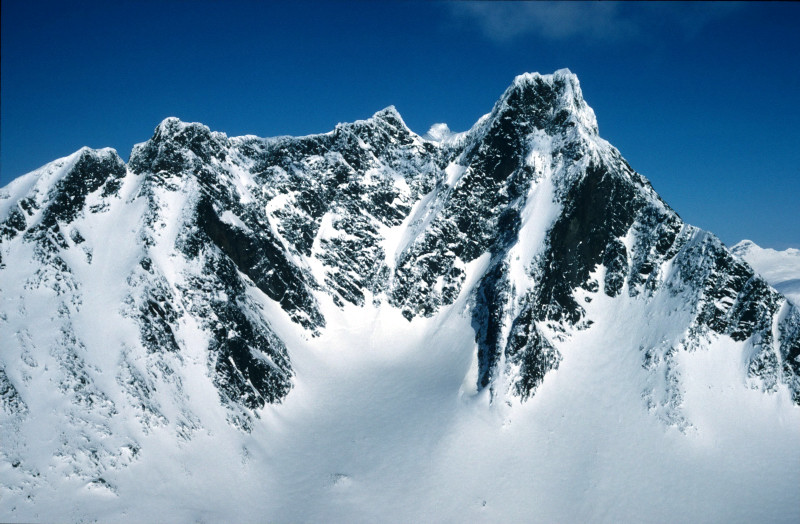
- Midtre Skagastølstind, Vetle Skagastølstind (center of image), Sentraltind (in the back above the saddle) and Store Skagastølstind (highest to the right) in May 1986

Highest point
- Elevation: 2,348 m (7,703 ft)
- Prominence: 94 m (308 ft)
- Parent peak: Storen
- Isolation: 0.61 km (0.38 mi)
- Listing: 10 at List of mountains in Norway by height
- Coordinates: 61°27′49″N 7°52′57″E

Geography
- Location: Vestland, Norway
- Parent range: Hurrungane, Jotunheimen
- Topo map: 1517 IV Hurrungane

Climbing
- First ascent: 7 August 1885 Carl Hall, Mathias Soggemoen, and Torger S. Sulheim

Sentraltind is a mountain in the Hurrungane mountains in the Jotunheimen mountain range. The 2,348-metre (7,703 ft) tall mountain is located in the eastern part of Luster Municipality in Vestland county, Norway. It is the 10th highest summit in Norway. Sentraltind lies on a ridge between Storen-Vetle Skagastølstindane and Styggedalstindane-Gjertvasstind. The mountain is 16 kilometres (9.9 mi) east of the village of Skjolden.

== Name ==
The first element is the loan word sentral which means "central" and the last element is the finite form of tind which means "mountain peak". The name is not very old.

== See also ==
- List of mountains of Norway
