= Sognefjellsvegen =

Mountain road in Norway

Sognefjellsvegen
- Bokmål: Fylkesvei 55; Nynorsk: Fylkesveg 55
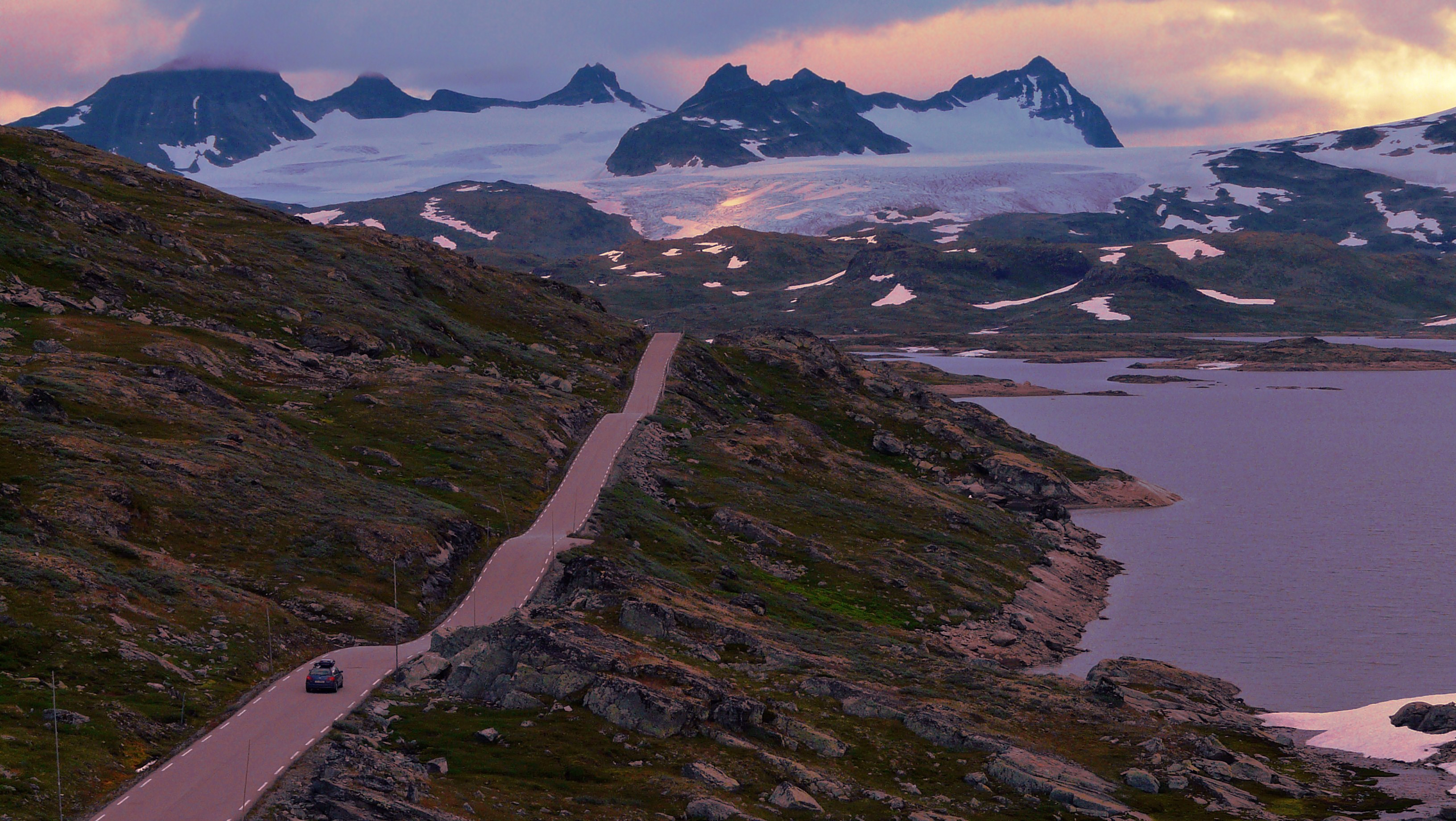

Route information
- Maintained by Norwegian Public Roads Administration
- Length: 110 km (68 mi)
- Existed: 16 July 1938–present

Major junctions
- South end: Gaupne, Luster Municipality, Vestland
- North end: Lom, Lom Municipality, Innlandet

Location
- Country: Norway

Highway system
- Roads in Norway; National Roads; County Roads

Sognefjellsvegen (Nynorsk) or Sognefjellsveien (Bokmål) is the highest mountain pass road in Northern Europe. Part of County Road 55, it is located in Innlandet and Vestland counties in Norway. It is a national tourist road and starts in the village of Lom in Lom Municipality, it then travels over the Sognefjell mountain area, and it ends in the village of Gaupne in Luster Municipality. The road was opened on 16 July 1938. The road passes through the Jotunheimen, Hurrungane, and Breheimen mountains. The highest point is Fantesteinen at an elevation of 1,434 metres (4,705 ft). During the winters there is a lot of snow, and so the road is closed from November through May. The road passes between Jotunheimen National Park and Breheimen National Park.

== Route ==
The road passes the villages of Galdesanden, Spiterstulen, and Elvesæter, then the mountain Galdhøpiggen, lake Bøvertunvatnet, and then the Bøvertun rest area. The rest areas of Krossbu and Sognefjellshytta are located beside the road high up in the mountains. Upon entering Luster Municipality, the road passes the lakes Prestesteinsvatnet and Hervavatnet with the mountain Fannaråki, just south of the road. Descending into the valley, the road passes the hotel Turtagrø, the villages of Skjolden, Luster, Høyheimsvik, and Nes before finally reaching Gaupne which is along the Sognefjorden.

== See also ==
- List of highest paved roads in Europe
- List of mountain passes
