= Gjertvasstind =

Mountain in Vestland, Norway

- Jervvasstind; Østre Styggedalstind (unofficial)
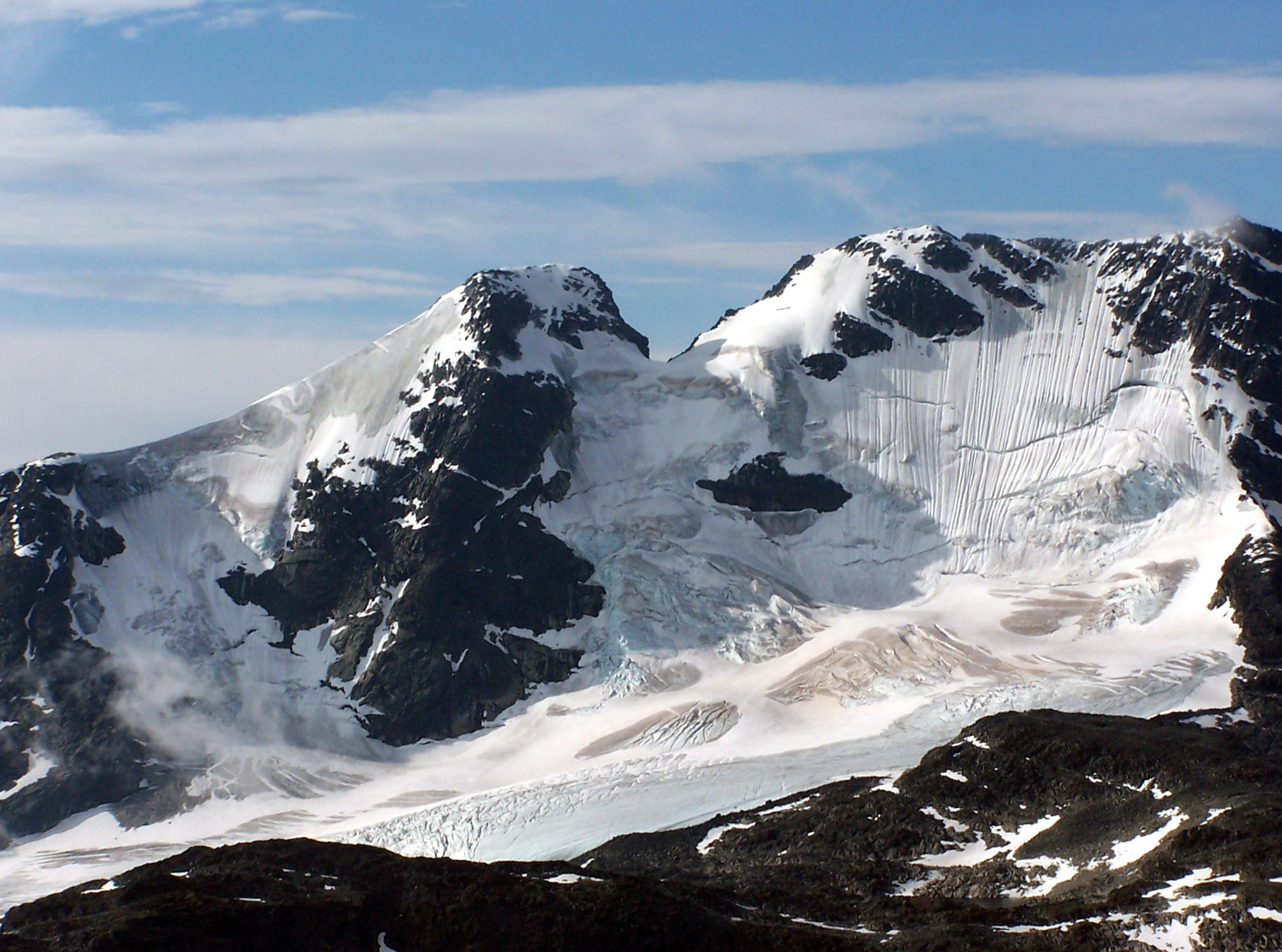
- Seen from Fannaråki

Highest point
- Elevation: 2,351 m (7,713 ft)
- Prominence: 120 m (390 ft)
- Isolation: 0.465 km (0.289 mi)
- Listing: 9 at List of mountains in Norway by height
- Coordinates: 61°27′53″N 7°54′40″E

Geography
- Location: Vestland, Norway
- Parent range: Hurrungane
- Topo map: 1517 IV Hurrungane

Climbing
- First ascent: 1876: William Cecil Slingsby, Emanuel Mohn, and K. Lykken
- Easiest route: Climbing

Gjertvasstind or Jervvasstind is Norway's ninth-highest mountain. The 2,351-metre-tall (7,713 ft) mountain lies in the Hurrungane mountains in the eastern part of Luster Municipality in Vestland county, Norway. It lies on the eastern end of a mountain ridge including the mountains (west to east) Store Skagastølstind-Vetle Skagastølstind-Sentraltind-Store Styggedalstind-Gjertvvasstind. The village of Skjolden is located 16 kilometres (9.9 mi) to the west.

== Name ==
Historically, the peak's name was spelled Jervvasstind. The first element is the genitive of the name of the lake Jervvatnet and the last element is tind which means "mountain peak". The first element in the lake name is jerv which means "wolverine" and the last element is the finite form of vatn which means "water" or "lake". Gjertvasstind has been the preferred spelling of the name since 2005.

== First ascents ==
The first recorded ascent was by William Cecil Slingsby and Emanuel Mohn in 1876. The first winter ascent was by Arne Randers Heen and Ernst Bakke in 1953.

== See also ==
- List of mountains of Norway
