= Fannaråkbreen =

Glacier in Vestland, Norway

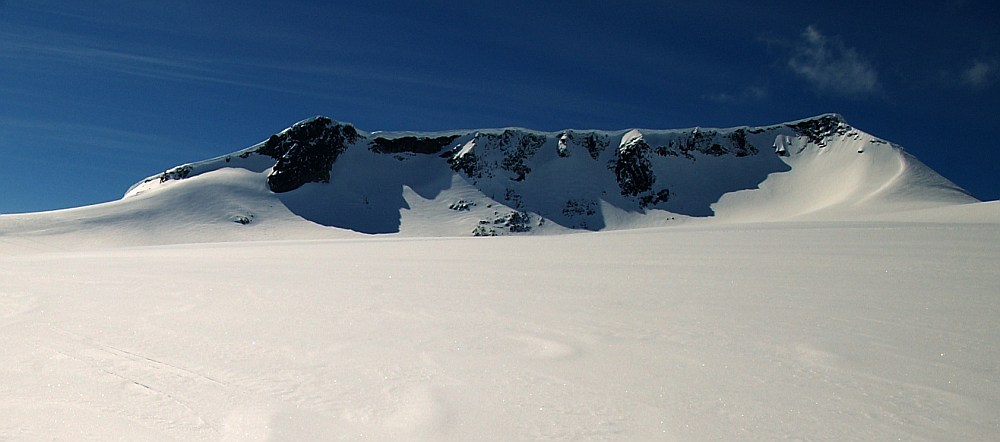
- Fannaråki, highest point to the right on the ridge as seen from Fannaråkbreen
- Interactive map of Fannaråkbreen
- Type: Mountain glacier
- Location: Vestland, Norway
- Coordinates: 61.525°N 7.93583°E
- Area: 6.2 km^{2} (2.4 sq mi)

Fannaråkbreen is a glacier in Luster Municipality in Vestland county, Norway. It covers an area of about 6.2-square-kilometre (2.4 sq mi), and consists of three parts. The glacier covers the eastern and northern sides of the mountain of Fannaråki, and is located within the Jotunheimen National Park.

== See also ==
- List of glaciers in Norway
