= Ole Mørk Sandvik =

Ole Mørk Sandvik (9 May 1875 – 5 August 1976) was a Norwegian educator, musicologist and folk-song collector.

== Background ==
Sandvik was born on the island of Helgøya in Hedmark, Norway. He was a son of school inspector Paul Knutsen Barstad Sandvik (1847–1936) and his wife Nikoline Petrine Mørk (1847–1927). His parents hailed from Ørsta and Volda. Three years later, his family moved to Hamar where he grew up. He graduated examen artium in 1893. He then began studying at the University of Kristiania. In 1897 he undertook theology studies. He graduated cand.theol. in 1902. He also graduated from the seminary at Hamar (Hamar lærerskole) in 1895.

== Career ==
Sandvik spent most of his career at the two schools; Vestheim (Vestheim høyere skole) from 1898 to 1913 and Hegdehaugen (Hegdehaugen skole) from 1913 to 1945. He also worked part-time as a singing teacher at the University of Oslo and the MF Norwegian School of Theology, from 1916. He remained at the university until 1947 and at MF until 1952. He took his doctorate in 1921 with the thesis Norsk folkemusik, særlig Østlandsmusikken. This was the first thesis on Norwegian folk music. The thesis was built on several travels in Norway, especially the Gudbrandsdal region, where he collected this music. A polemic took place between Sandvik and colleague Catharinus Elling. Elling held that folk music pieces had to be polished by professionals, whereas Sandvik argued that the music should be played in the tradition of the country folk.

Sandvik became vice president of the International Folk Music Council at its inception in 1947. President at the time was Ralph Vaughan Williams. In Norway Sandvik founded the Norwegian Folk Music Research Association in 1948, and chaired the organization from 1948 to 1965. Sandvik also wrote books on church music and choral music. He was a member of the Norwegian Academy of Science and Letters from 1939.

== Personal life ==
In July 1906, he married pianist Nanna Rønneberg Munthe-Kaas (1880–1965). He was decorated as a Knight, First Class of the Royal Norwegian Order of St. Olav in 1949. In 1966 he was awarded honorary membership in the Norwegian National Association for Traditional Music and Dance. He died in Oslo, having reached the age of 101 and was buried at the cemetery of Ris Church.

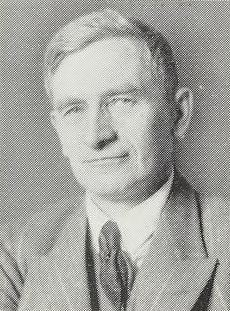
Ole Mørk Sandvik, was a Norwegian educator.
