= Vetle Skagastølstindane =

Mountain in Vestland, Norway

Vetle Skagastølstindane Vetle Skarstølstindane
- Vetle Skagastølstind
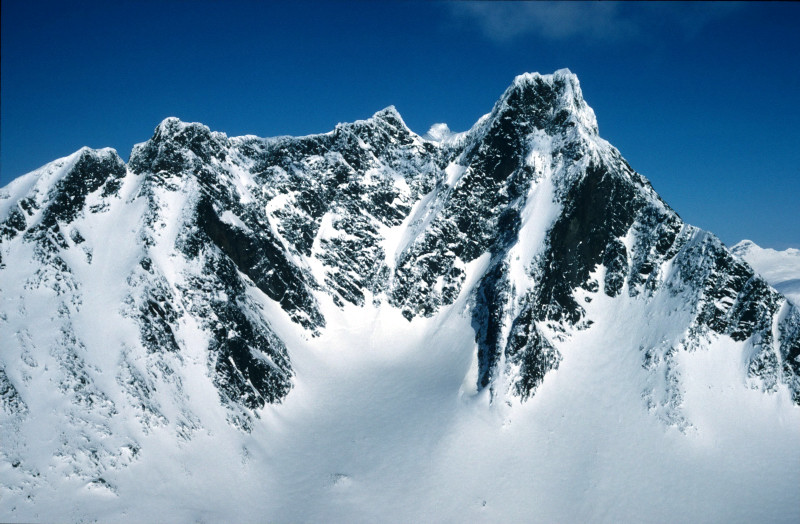
- Vetle Skagastølstindane in the centre. Storen is the peak on right. Midtre Skagastølstindane on left.

Highest point
- Elevation: 2,340 m (7,680 ft)
- Prominence: 85 m (279 ft)
- Parent peak: Storen
- Isolation: 0.321 km (0.199 mi)
- Listing: 15 at List of mountains in Norway by height
- Coordinates: 61°27′52″N 7°52′26″E

Geography
- Location: Vestland, Norway
- Parent range: Hurrungane
- Topo map: 1517 IV Hurrungane

Vetle Skagastølstindane or Vetle Skarstølstindane is one of the peaks constituting Skagastølstindane ("Skagastøl peaks") in the Hurrungane mountain range and is among Norway's highest. The 2,340-metre (7,680 ft) tall mountain is located in the eastern part of Luster Municipality in Vestland county, Norway. It lies directly between the mountains Midtre Skagastølstindane, Storen, and Sentraltind. The mountains Styggedalstindane and Gjertvasstind lie 1.5 kilometres (0.93 mi) to the east, and the village of Skjolden lies 15 kilometres (9.3 mi) to the west.

== Name ==
The first element is the genitive of the name of the mountain farm Skagastølen and the last element is tind which means "mountain peak". The mountain farm (dairy farm) Skagastølen belongs to the farm Skagen in Luster Municipality and stølen is the finite form of støl which means "mountain farm". Skagen is the finite form of skage which means "headland" or "promontory" and the name is equivalent to the famous Skagen in Denmark. The words vetle means "the small".

== See also ==
- List of mountains in Norway by height
