= Aunt Mary =

- Origin: Fredrikstad, Østfold, Norway
- Genres: Progressive rock
- Years active: 1970–1973, several reunions since 1978
- Labels: Polydor

Aunt Mary is a Norwegian prog rock band from the 1970s.

They signed a recording contract with Polydor Records in Denmark, to facilitate the release of Aunt Mary in 1970. The group gradually moved towards progressive rock with the records Loaded in 1972 and Janus in 1973. The group disbanded in 1973, but has reunited for several concerts since 1978.

The band's former lead vocalist, Jan Groth, died from cancer on 27 August 2014, at the age of 68.

The band toured the US in 2019

== Musicians ==
- Jan Groth - Vocals, keyboards, guitar
- Bjørn Kristiansen - Guitar, vocals
- Svein Gundersen - Bass, piano, vocals
- Ketil Stensvik - Drums, vocals
- Bengt Jenssen - Keyboards
- Eirikur Hauksson - Bass
- Per Ivar Fure - Flute, sax, vocals
- Ivan Lauritzen - Drums
- Øystein Selenius Olsen - Bass

== Discography ==
Studio albums

- 1970: Aunt Mary (Polydor) gjenutgitt 1974 på Karussell som Whispering Farewell
- 1972: Loaded (Philips)
- 1973: Janus (Vertigo)
- 1992: Bluesprints (Sonet)
- 2016: New Dawn (Playground)

Compilation albums

- 1974: The Best of Aunt Mary (Philip)
- 1975: The Best of Aunt Mary Volume 2 (Philips)
- 2007: The Things We Stood For

Live albums

- 1981: Live Reunion (Philips)
- 2009: Barbed Wire Waves (Pan) - a radio concert recorded in 1971

=== Singles ===
(selective)

- 1970: "Did You Notice?"/"The Ball"
- 1971: "Jimi, Janis and Brian"/"Stop Your Wishful Thinking"
- 1971: "Whispering Farewell"/"All My Sympathy for Lily"
- 1972: "G Flat Road"/"Joinin' the Crowd"
- 1972: "Rosalind"/"In the Hall of the Mountain King"
- 1973: "Nocturnal Voice"/"Mr. Kaye"
- 2016: "Slave Parade"
