= Jan Groth =

Norwegian musician (1946–2014)

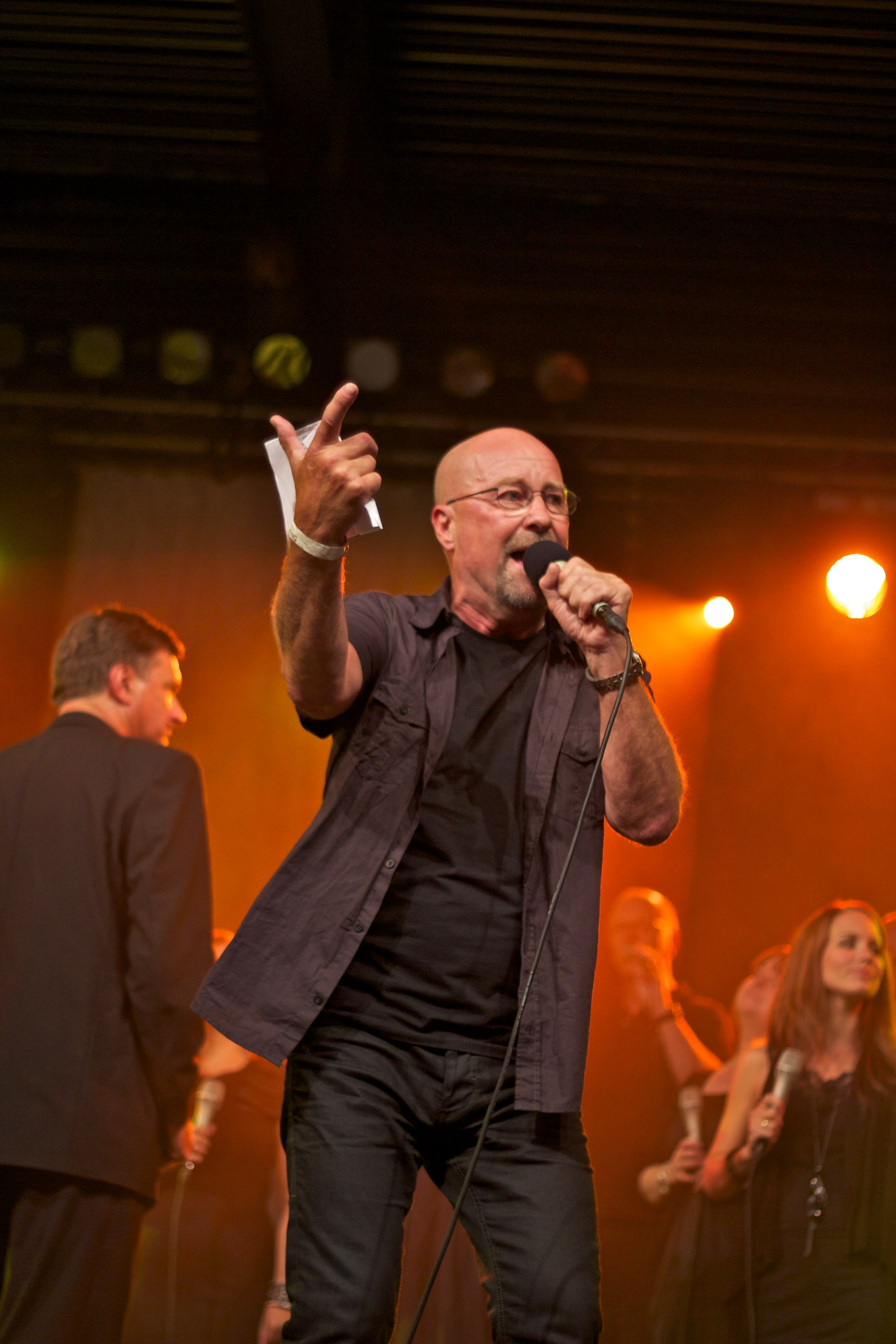
- Groth performing in 2011

Background information
- Born: 25 February 1946; Sarpsborg, Norway
- Died: 27 August 2014 (aged 68)
- Genres: Progressive Rock, Christian Rock
- Formerly of: Aunt Mary, Just 4 Fun

Jan Leonard Groth (25 February 1946 – 27 August 2014) was a Norwegian musician.

== Biography ==
Groth was born in the borough of Greåker in Sarpsborg, Norway. He first made his name in the early 1970s as a member of the progressive rock band Aunt Mary, where he was lead singer and keyboardist. Groth later moved on to Christian rock, where he most notably sang rock versions of preacher Aage Samuelsen's songs. He was also a member of the band Just 4 Fun. Just 4 Fun participated for Norway in the 1991 Eurovision Song Contest with the song "Mrs. Thompson". In 2007, he released the album Sanger fra T.B. Barratts salmebok to mark the 100th anniversary of the Pentecostal Church in Norway.

Groth died on 27 August 2014, aged 68, from cancer.
