= Hurrungane =

Mountain range in Norway

- Hurrungene, Hurrungadn, Horungane (unofficial)
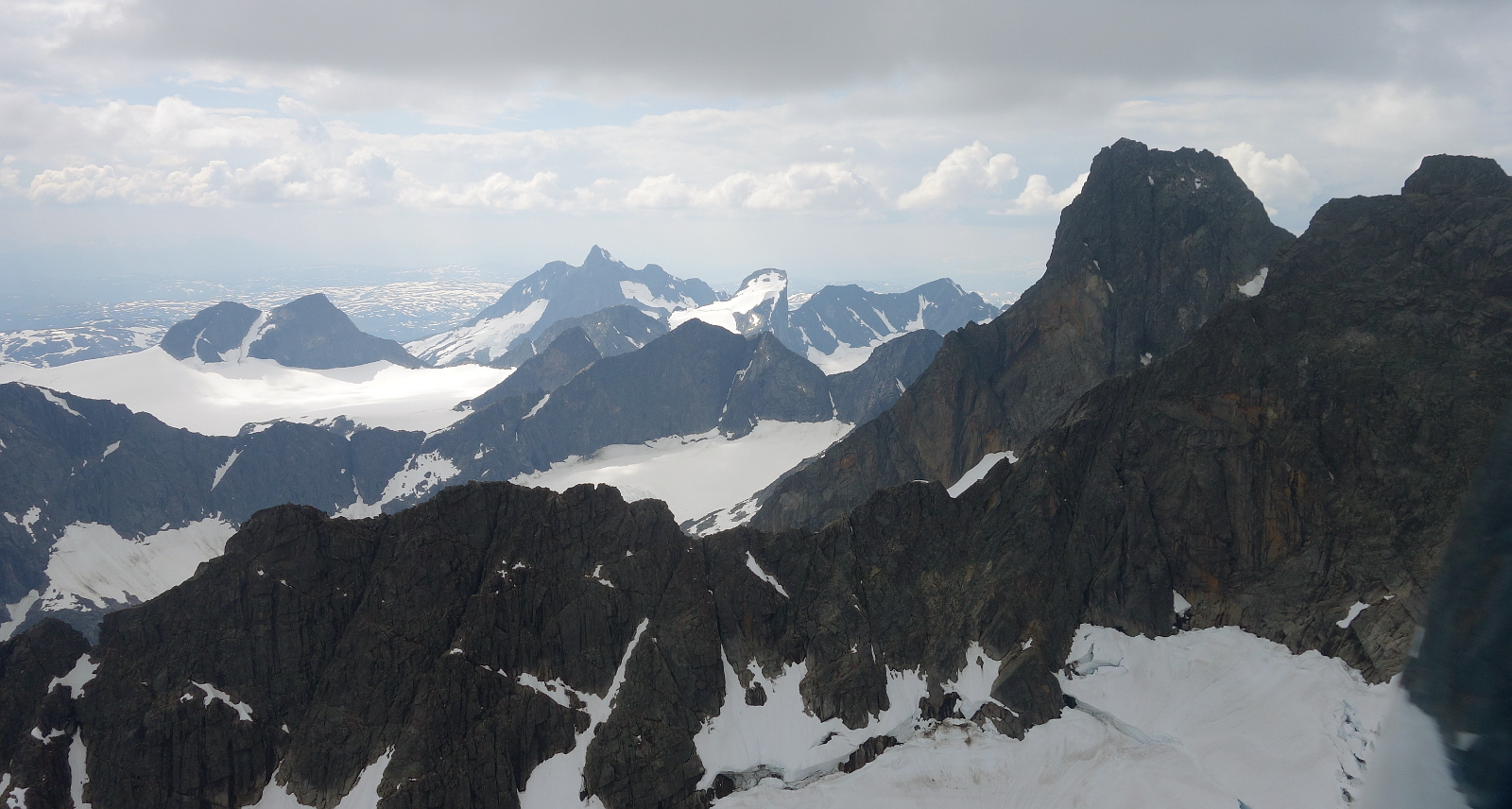
- Hurrungane seen looking towards the west. Storen is the highest peak visible.

Highest point
- Peak: Storen, Luster/Årdal, Norway
- Elevation: 2,405 m (7,890 ft)
- Coordinates: 61°27′41″N 07°52′17″E

Geography
- Location: Vestland, Norway
- Range coordinates: 61.4495°N 7.8434°E
- Parent range: Jotunheimen

Hurrungane is a mountain range in Luster Municipality and Årdal Municipality in Vestland county, Norway. The area is southwest in the larger mountain range Jotunheimen and is also part of Jotunheimen National Park.

The range has some of the most alpine peaks in Norway, and has 23 peaks over 2,000 metres (6,600 ft) (counting peaks with larger prominence than 30 metres or 98 feet). Several of the peaks are only accessible through climbing or glacier crossings. The starting point for hiking is the village of Turtagrø along the national tourist road, Sognefjellsvegen (RV55).

The highest peaks in the area are

- Storen: 2,405 m or 7,890 ft
- Styggedalstindane: 2,387 m or 7,831 ft
- Gjertvasstind: 2,351 m or 7,713 ft
- Sentraltind: 2,348 m or 7,703 ft
- Vetle Skagastølstindane: 2,340 m or 7,680 ft
- Midtre Skagastølstindane: 2,284 m or 7,493 ft
- Skagastølsnebbet: 2,222 m or 7,290 ft
- Store Austanbottstind: 2,202 m or 7,224 ft

== Name ==
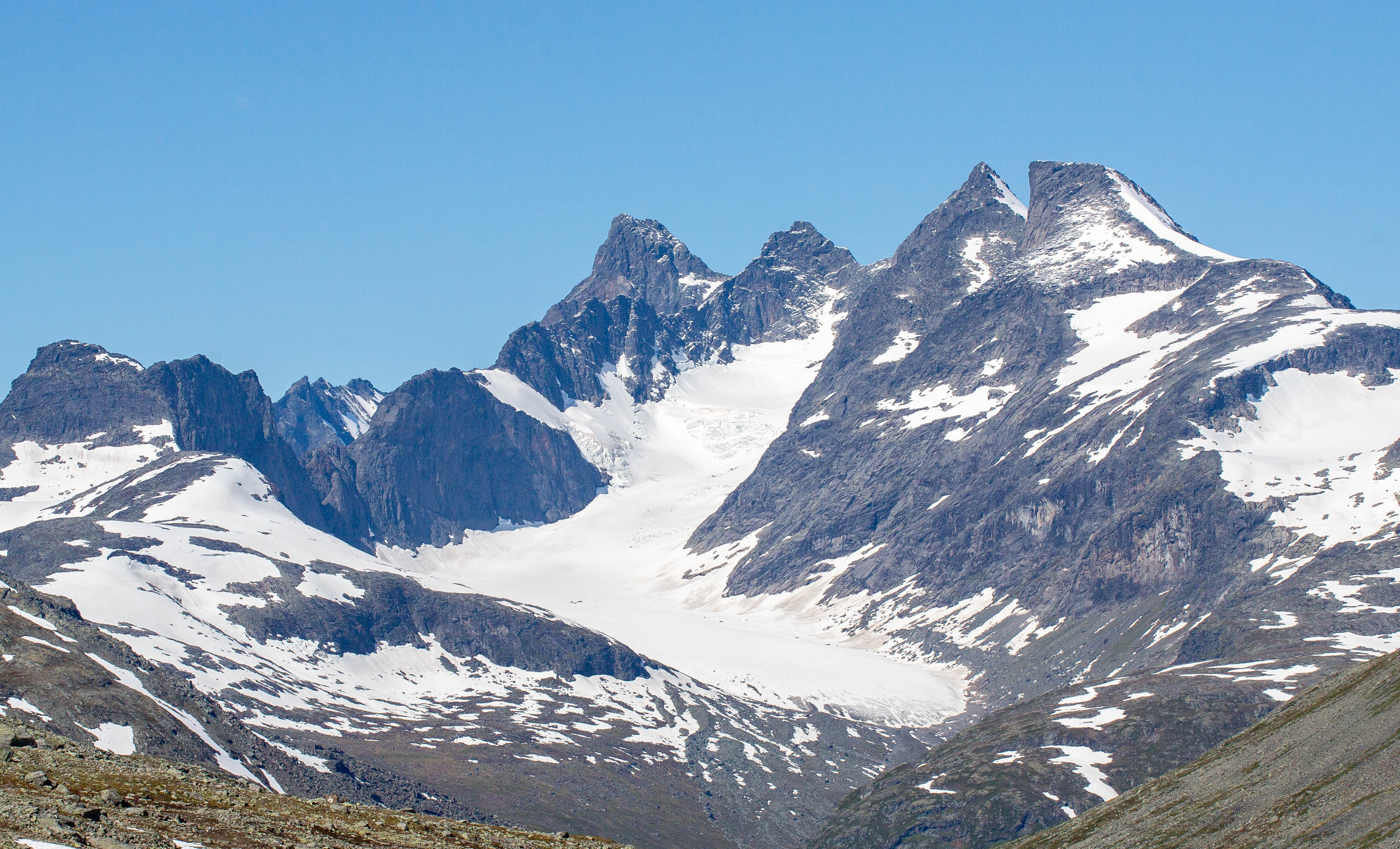
The east face of Hurrungane as seen down Uradalen.

Hurrungane is the finite plural of a word hurrung. Hurrungen, the finite singular of the same word, is the names of two mountains in Rauma Municipality and Skjåk Municipality. The first element is the verb hurra which means "hurry, move fast (with noise and roar)". The last element is the suffix -ung, referring to an active thing/person. The actual mountains are steep, and there are frequent rockslides and avalanches from the hillsides. The meaning of the name is then "the noisemakers".

== See also ==
- List of mountains of Norway
