= Carl Hall (mountaineer) =

Danish mountaineer

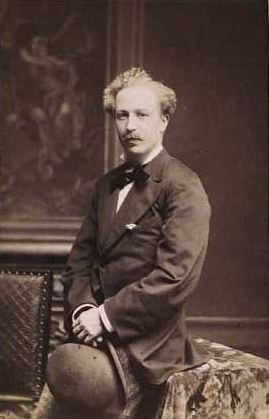
- Carl Hall
- Born: 13 August 1848; Frederiksberg, Denmark
- Died: 6 May 1908 (aged 59)
- Occupations: Journalist; Photographer; Mountaineer
- Known for: 46 first ascents of Norwegian mountains, including 24 peaks in Jotunheimen
- Parent: Carl Christian Hall

Carl Christian Hall (13 August 1848 – 6 May 1908) was a Danish mountaineering pioneer. He was born in Frederiksberg as a son of Prime Minister Carl Christian Hall. He made 46 first ascents of Norwegian mountains including Store Austanbotntind in 1883 (with Mathias Soggemoen. Several geographical features are named after Hall including Hall's Hammer. He was decorated Knight of the Order of St. Olav in 1890.

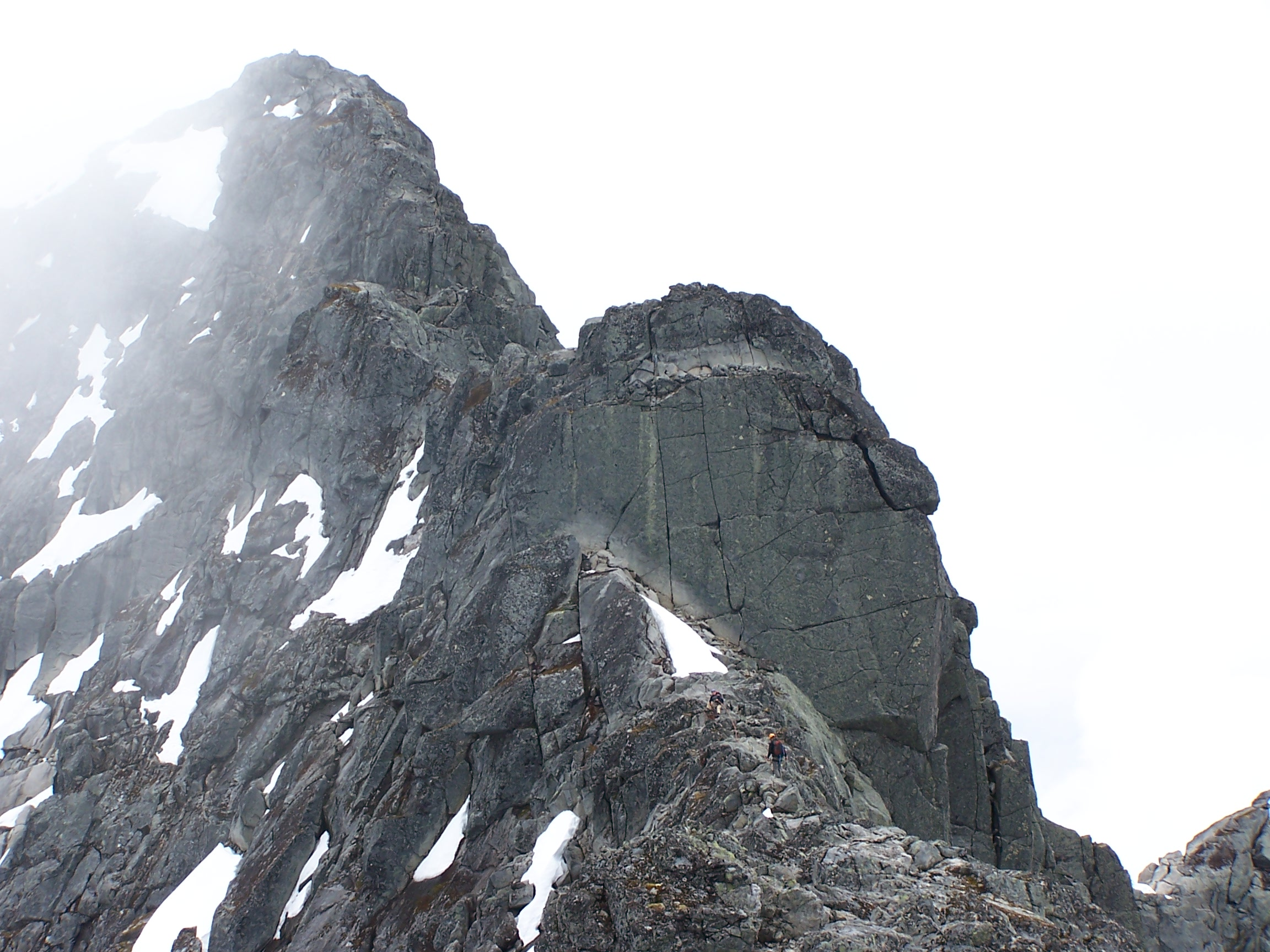
The wall Hall's Hammer between Midtre and Vetle Skagastølstind is named after Carl Hall
