= Paul Knutsen Barstad Sandvik =

Paul Knutsen Barstad Sandvik (9 April 1847 – 24 December 1936) was a Norwegian educator and musician.

== Biography ==
He was born at Ørsta Municipality in Romsdalen county, Norway. He was a son of Knut Barstad and his wife Ragnhild, née Brekke. His father died in 1849, and his mother remarried to Knut Sandvik in 1855. He attended school in Volda as well as Stord Teacher's College, and worked in his early career as a teacher in Volda, Nordfjord and Helgøya (from 1869). In June 1870 at Borgund Church he married Nikoline Mork (1847–1927) from Volda. He was the father of musicologist Ole Mørk Sandvik and singer Ingeborg Sandvik Kristensen. He was later headhunted to work in Hamar, the regional large city near Helgøya. While living here he also co-edited the periodical Norsk Skoletidende, founded in Hamar by Nils Hertzberg (editor from 1869 to 1873), stepping down in 1918.

He was a board member of Hamar public library from 1887 to 1936. Hobbies included horticulture and beekeeping, as well as song and music—he was an organist in Nes Church for many years and later a sexton in Hamar. From 1907 to 1914 he served as the "national song inspector" in Norway. In Norsk biografisk leksikon he was called "a personality of unusual strength and many-sidedness".

Sandvik held the HM The King's Medal of Merit (Kongens fortjenstmedalje) from 1899. He died in December 1936 in Hamar. In February 1955 a bust was raised of him.
