= Skogadalsbøen =

Building in Luster, Vestland, Norway

Coordinates: 61°27′47″N 8°00′51″E

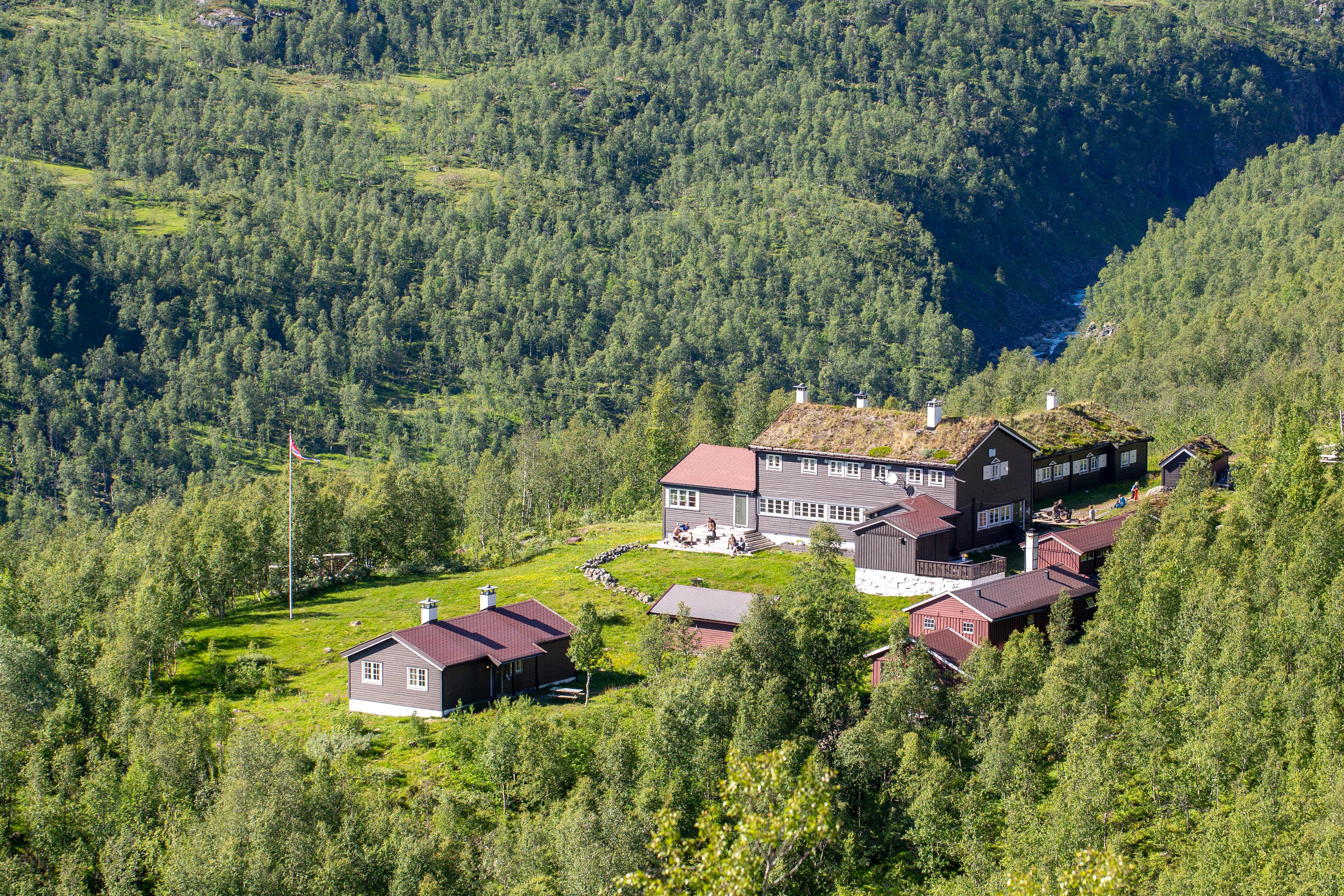
Skogadalsbøen mountain cabin

Skogadalsbøen is a mountain hut in Luster Municipality in Vestland county, Norway. The cabin is located in the western part of Jotunheimen, owned by the Norwegian Trekking Association (DNT). The cabin lies at an elevation of 834 metres (2,736 ft) above sea level in the Utladalen valley. The site was originally the location of several summer mountain farms (seter). The tourist cabin was built in 1888 and originally had 12 beds; today there are 109 beds.
