= Storen (mountain) =

Mountain in Vestland, Norway

Storen Store Skagastølstinden
- Store Skagastølstind
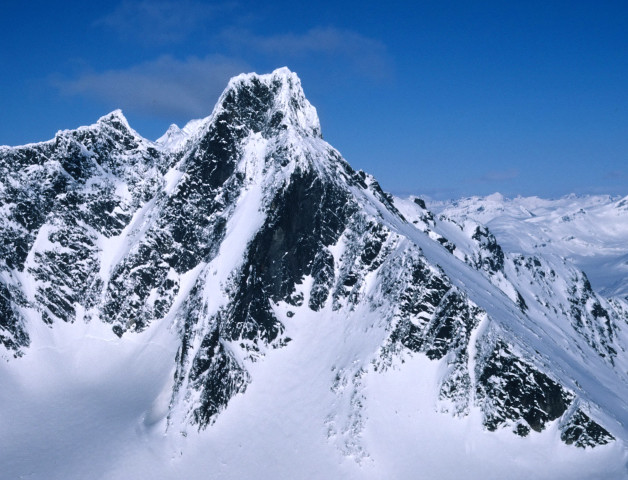
- Seen from Dyrhaugsryggen. Vetle Skagastølstindane to the left.

Highest point
- Elevation: 2,405 m (7,890 ft)
- Prominence: 1,024 m (3,360 ft)
- Parent peak: Galdhøpiggen
- Isolation: 30.3 km (18.8 mi)
- Listing: 3rd highest in Norway
- Coordinates: 61°27′40″N 7°52′19″E

Geography
- Location: Vestland, Norway
- Parent range: Hurrungane
- Topo map: 1517 IV Hurrungane

Climbing
- First ascent: 21 July 1876: William Cecil Slingsby
- Easiest route: Climbing and ice climbing

Storen or Store Skagastølstinden is the third highest peak in Norway. It is situated on the border between Luster Municipality and Årdal Municipality in Vestland county, Norway. The 2,405-metre (7,890 ft) mountain is part of the Hurrungane range. The mountains Vetle Skagastølstindane and Midtre Skagastølstindane lie immediately to the north of this mountain and the mountains Sentraltind and Gjertvasstind lie immediately to the east of this mountain.

The summit is a popular destination for mountaineers, but it is fairly difficult to climb. The first ascent of Storen was made by William Cecil Slingsby on 21 July 1876. There are a number of different routes, the most popular being Heftyes renne (Heftye's couloir). Another popular route of ascent is via Andrews renne (Andrew's couloir), used in the first ascent of A. W. Andrews and party in 1899. It is part of the Skagastøl Traverse, one of Norway's most challenging climbing routes. The first ascent of the traverse was made by George Wegner Paus, Harold Raeburn, Kristian Lous, and Kristian Tandberg on 5 August 1902. Storen and the mountaineering of the late 19th century in Norway is traditionally linked to the historical hotel Turtagrø.

== Name ==
The official name of the mountain is Storen, but Store Skagastølstinden is also approved for use as an alternate name. The older spelling Store Skagastølstind is no longer prioritized for use. The first element of the older name is the genitive of the name of the mountain farm Skagastølen and the last element is tind which means "mountain peak". The mountain farm (dairy farm) Skagastølen belongs to the farm Skagen in Luster Municipality and stølen is the finite form of støl which means "mountain farm". Skagen is the finite form of skage which means "headland" or "promontory" and the name is equivalent with the famous Skagen in Denmark. The word store or storen means "The Big".

== Ascents ==
Slingsby's first ascent in 1876 was hailed as a major achievement, and Johannes Heftye soon felt it eclipsed his own first ascent of Knutsholstinden the year before. He set out to ascend Storen in 1880 and successfully used the popular route that is now named after him to reach the summit. This route is significantly more difficult than Slingsby's route, and also more difficult than Heftye's own route on Store Knutsholstind, however, Heftye downplayed this achievement to emphasize his own first ascent. His main claim was that Store Knutsholstind was at least as difficult as Storen, thus, must be regarded a first grade mountain.

While Heftye's route on Store Knutsholstind may have been slightly more difficult than Slingsby's route on Storen, Heftye was at the time unaware that there were an easier route on Store Knutsholstind. Slingsby was approached by Marie Sønstenes, a woman who lived on farm near Store Knutsholstind, who claimed that she knew a straightforward route. Together, they ascended the mountain by this route. Heftye, who was very outspoken against female mountaineers, was humiliated and deeply offended.

It is part of the Skagastøl Traverse, one of Norway's most challenging climbing routes. The first ascent of the traverse was made by George Wegner Paus, Harold Raeburn, Kristian Lous and Kristian Tandberg on 5 August 1902.

== See also ==
- List of mountains of Norway
- Scandinavian mountain range
