= Kåre Kolberg =

Norwegian composer, organist, and music critic

- Born: 24 April 1936; Birkenes Municipality, Norway
- Died: 19 August 2014 (aged 78)
- Occupations: Composer, organist, and music critic

Kåre Kolberg (24 April 1936 – 19 August 2014) was a Norwegian composer, organist and music critic.

== Career ==
Kåre Kolberg was born on 24 April 1936 in Birkenes Municipality in Aust-Agder, Norway. He was educated as an organist at the Oslo Conservatory of Music and earned his master's degree in musicology from the University of Oslo. He was an assistant at the university from 1964 to 1966. He started his professional career in 1961 as organist at Grorud Church in Oslo, a position he served for the next 20 years. He worked from 1967 to 1970 as a music critic in Dagbladet.

From 1970 to 1973 he was chairman of the Norwegian Section of the ISCM - Ny Musikk. He chaired the Norwegian Society of Composers from 1979 to 1985, and was awarded honorary membership of the society in 1996. In 2002, he was awarded the Arne Nordheim composer’s prize (Arne Nordheims komponistpris) from the Norwegian Ministry of Education, Research and Church Affairs.

Kolberg’s break-through as a composer came with 1964’s Quartetto pr. archi followed by the vocal work Plym-Plym. Kolberg is also regarded as a pioneer in Norwegian electro-acoustic music, exemplified by his The Emperor's New Tie (1973), the first work of this genre in Norway. Other key Kolberg works includes Duo for oboe and clarinet (1962), Ludus (organ, 1962), Spøkelsessonaten (1972), Tivoli (TV-opera, 1974), En blåsekvintett (1976), Ennå er det håp (chamber ensemble, 1978), Sånn kan det gå (polka for soprano and piano, 1984) and Bozza (1994). Kolberg also penned a number of works for jazz ensembles and popular music groups.

== Production ==
=== Selected works ===
==== Opera, ballet, stage productions and multi media ====
- Hakena'nit (1968)
- Tivoli (libretto by P. E. Fosser, based on D. Thomas' After the Fair) (1974)

==== Vocal works ====
- Plym-Plym (for mixed choir, vocal quartet and speaker) (1966)
- For the time being (for vocal quartet), (1985)

==== Orchestra ====
- Suoni per archi (1965)
- Bozza per orchestra (1994)

==== Chamber music ====
- Quartetto per archi (1964)
- Jaba 768 (for jazz trio or ad lib) (1968)
- Pasticcio (for recorder quartet) (1976)

==== Electro-acoustic music ====
- Keiserens nye slips (1973)

==== Organ ====
- Ludus (1962)

=== Discography ===
- Nova (2009)
- Oslo Sinfonietta, Norges Musikkhistorie (2001)
- Certainty and doubt (1999)
- BIT20 Ensemble, Norwegian Signatures (1995)
- Geir Henning Braaten, Norwegian Panorama (1984)
- Popofoni (1973)
