= Skjolden =

Village in Luster Municipality, Norway

- Village
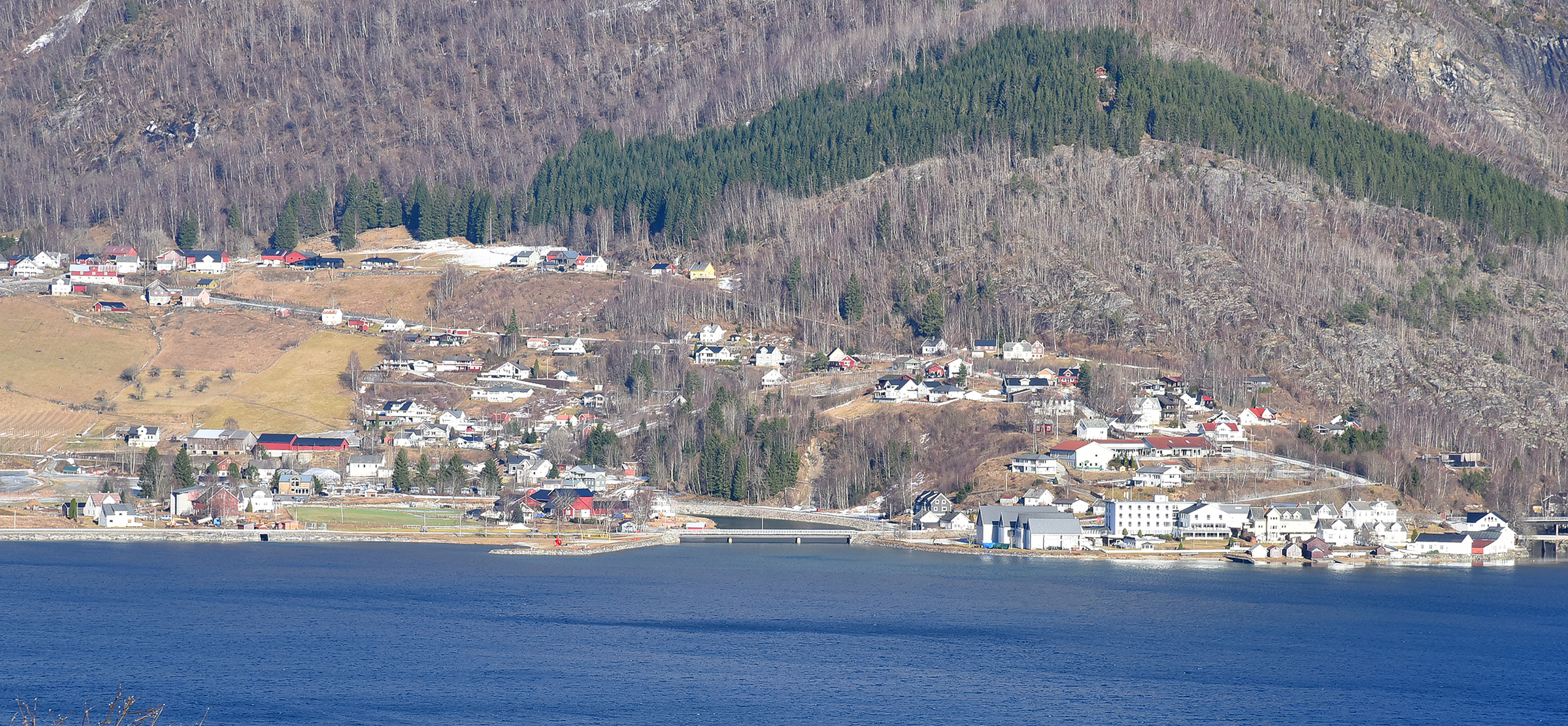
- View of Skjolden
- Interactive map of Skjolden
- Location within Vestland Location within Norway
- Coordinates: 61.49096°N 7.60009°E
- Country: Norway
- Region: Western Norway
- County: Vestland
- District: Sogn
- Municipality: Luster Municipality

Area
  - Total: 0.51 km^{2} (0.20 sq mi)
- Elevation: 7 m (23 ft)

Population (2025)
  - Total: 238
  - Density: 467/km^{2} (1,210/sq mi)
- Time zone: UTC+01:00 (CET)
  - Summer (DST): UTC+02:00 (CEST)
- Post Code: 6876 Skjolden

Skjolden is a village in Luster Municipality in Vestland county, Norway. It is located at the end of the Lustrafjorden, a branch of the Sognefjorden. Skjolden is located at the innermost point of the Sognefjorden (Norway's longest fjord). The length of the Sognefjorden is over 200 kilometres (120 mi) and it is measured from Skjolden to the island of Ytre Sula where the fjord meets the ocean. The valleys of Mørkridsdal and Fortunsdal meet at Skjolden, just west of the Hurrungane mountains.

The 0.51-square-kilometre (130-acre) village has a population (2025) of 238 and a population density of 467 inhabitants per square kilometre (1,210/sq mi).

The village is located along the Sognefjellsvegen road, about 20 kilometres (12 mi) west of the lake Prestesteinsvatnet and the mountain Fannaråki. Skjolden is about 25 kilometres (16 mi) northeast of the village of Gaupne and about 35 kilometres (22 mi) northeast of the village of Hafslo. North of the village is Breheimen National Park, home of the glaciers Harbardsbreen and Spørteggbreen and the mountain Tverrådalskyrkja.

== Notable people ==
The village was home to philosopher Ludwig Wittgenstein who lived here after 1913 during some periods of his life; the longest one was 13 months. Important parts of his works were written here. He had designed a small wooden house that was erected on a remote rock over the Eidsvatnet Lake in 1913 and called "Østerrike" (Austria) by locals. It was broken up in 1958 to be rebuilt in the village. A local foundation collected donations and bought the house in 2014; it was dismantled again and re-erected at its original location; the inauguration took place on 20 June 2019 under international attendance.

== Media gallery ==
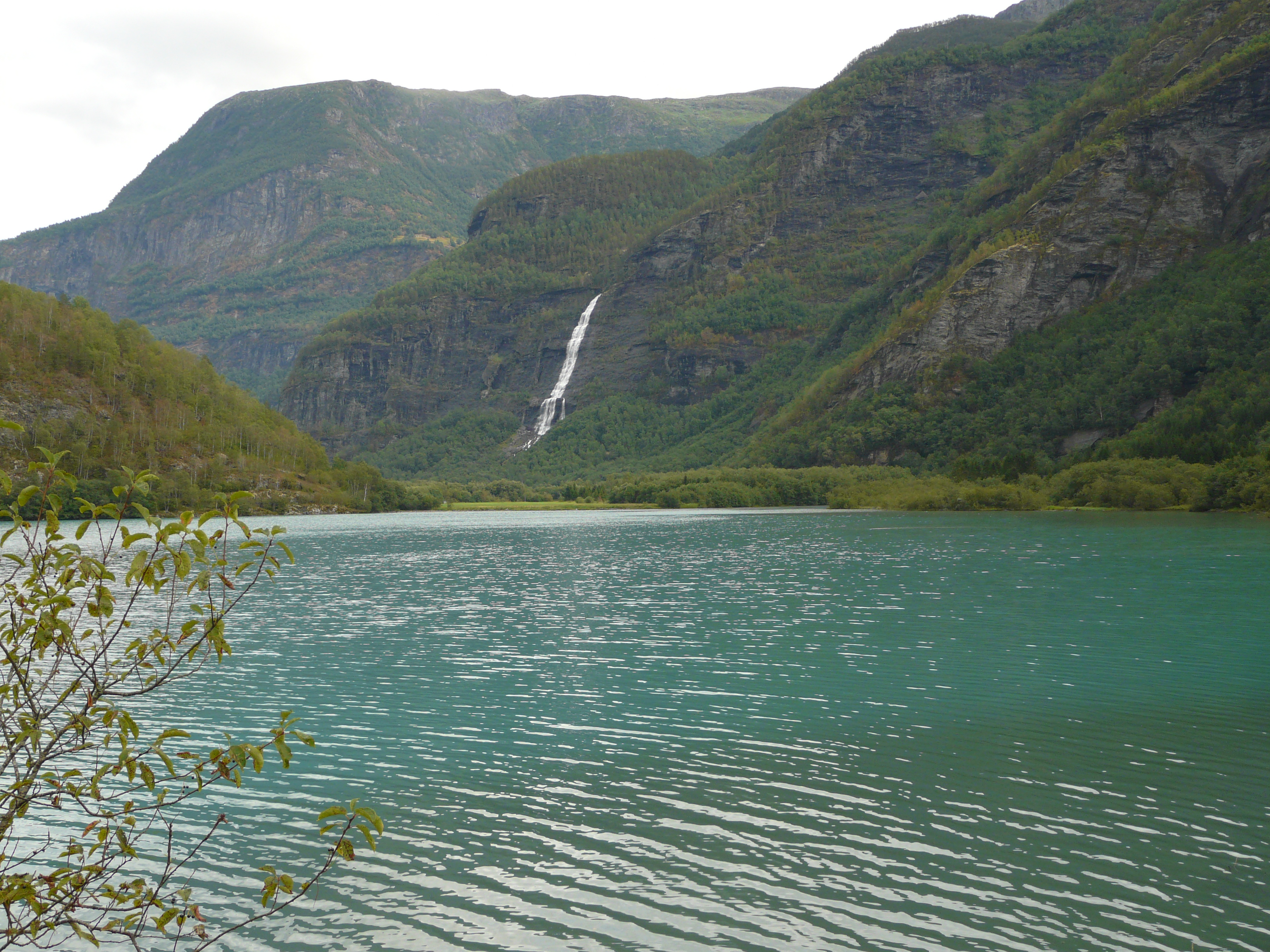
View of the Vassbakken waterfall

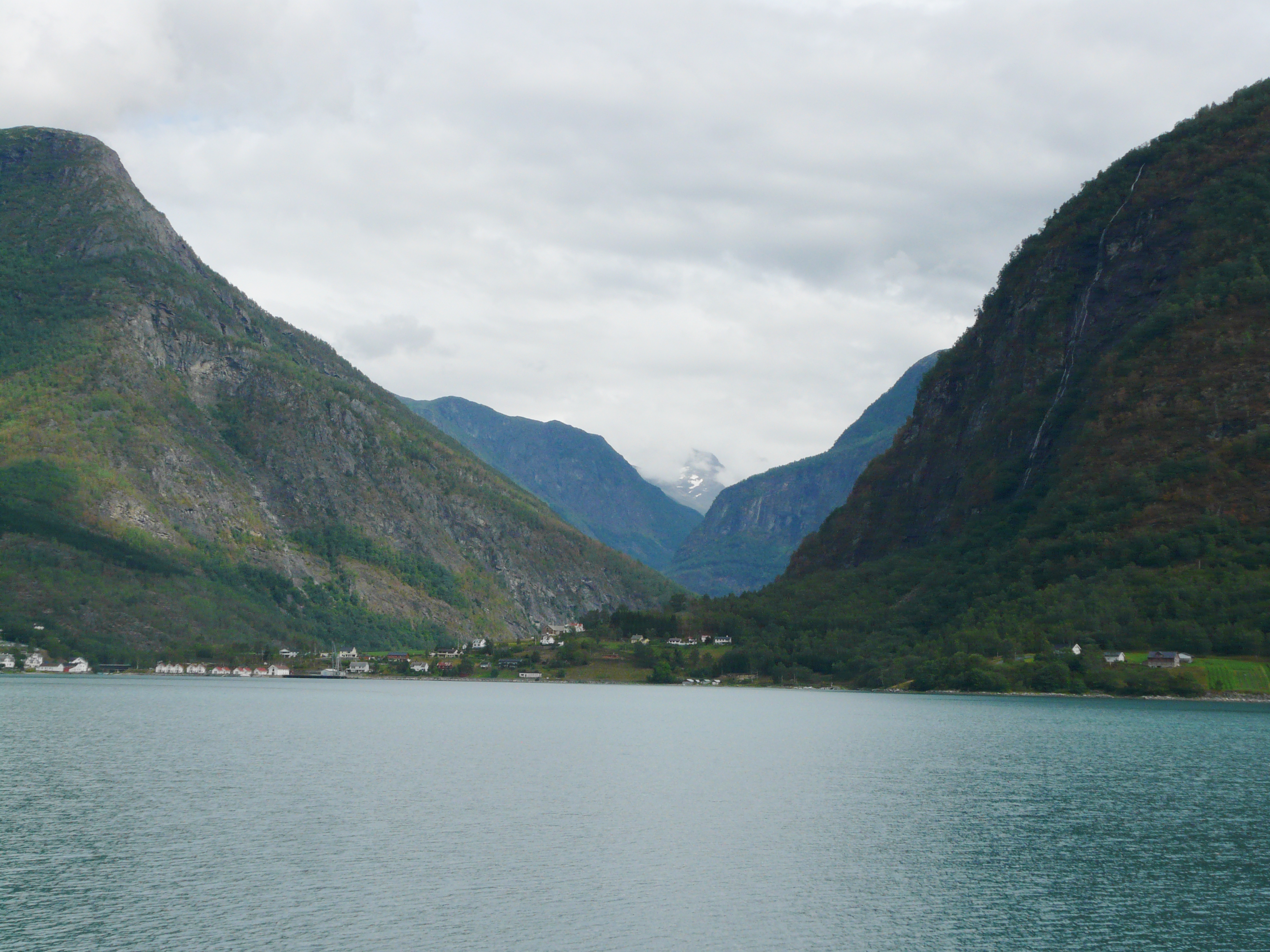
Skjolden village

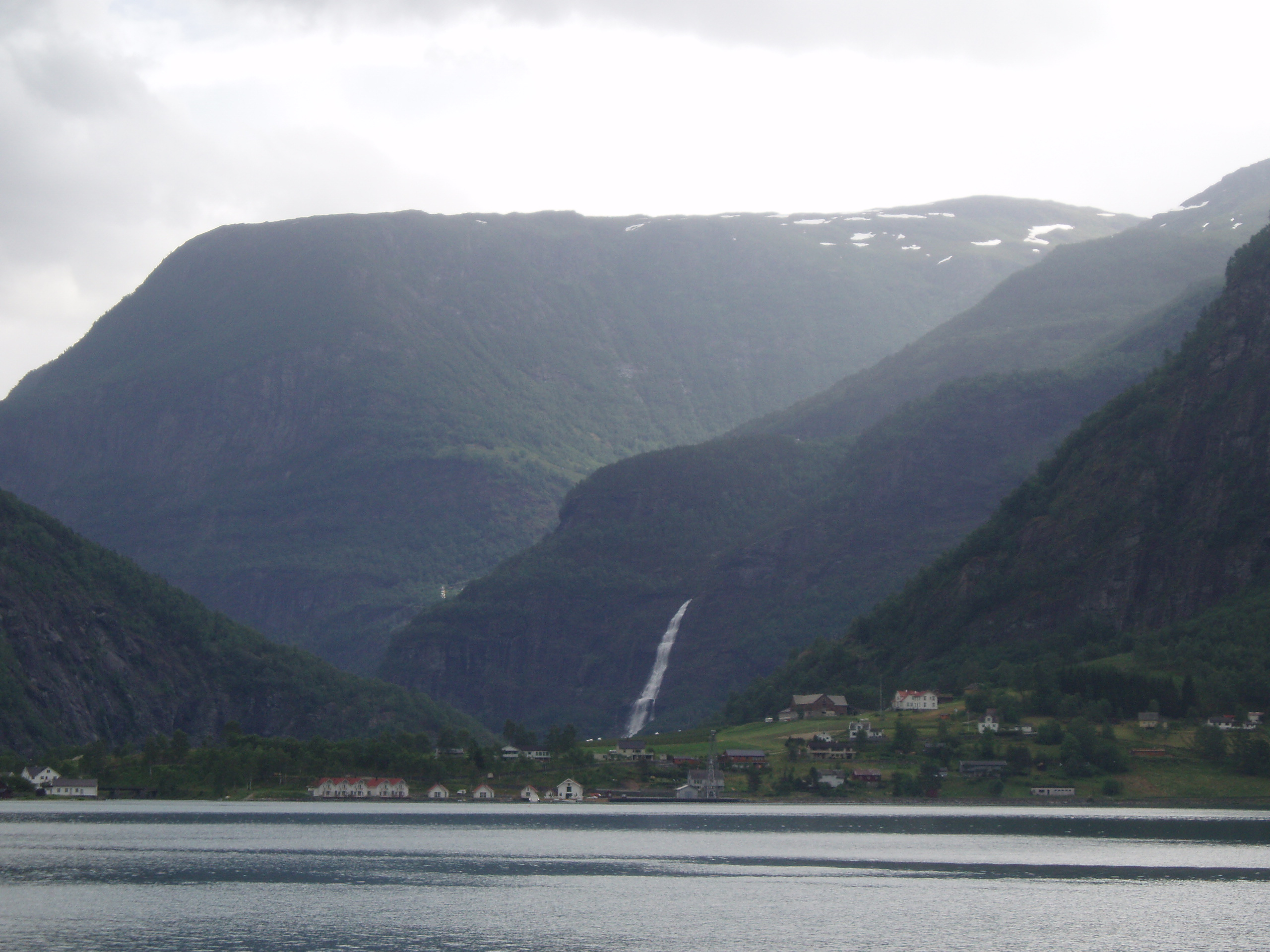
View of the village with waterfall behind

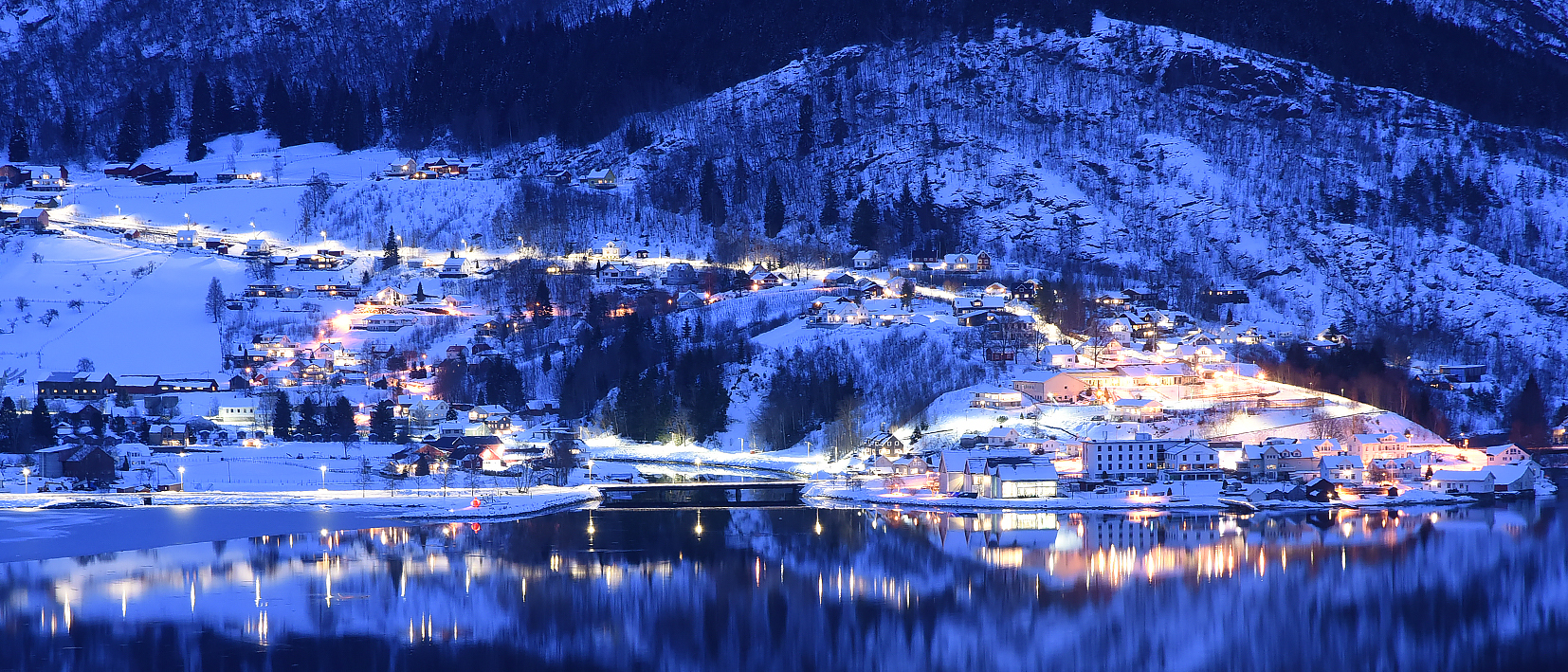
View of Skjolden in February 2024
Credit: Vadim Chuprina

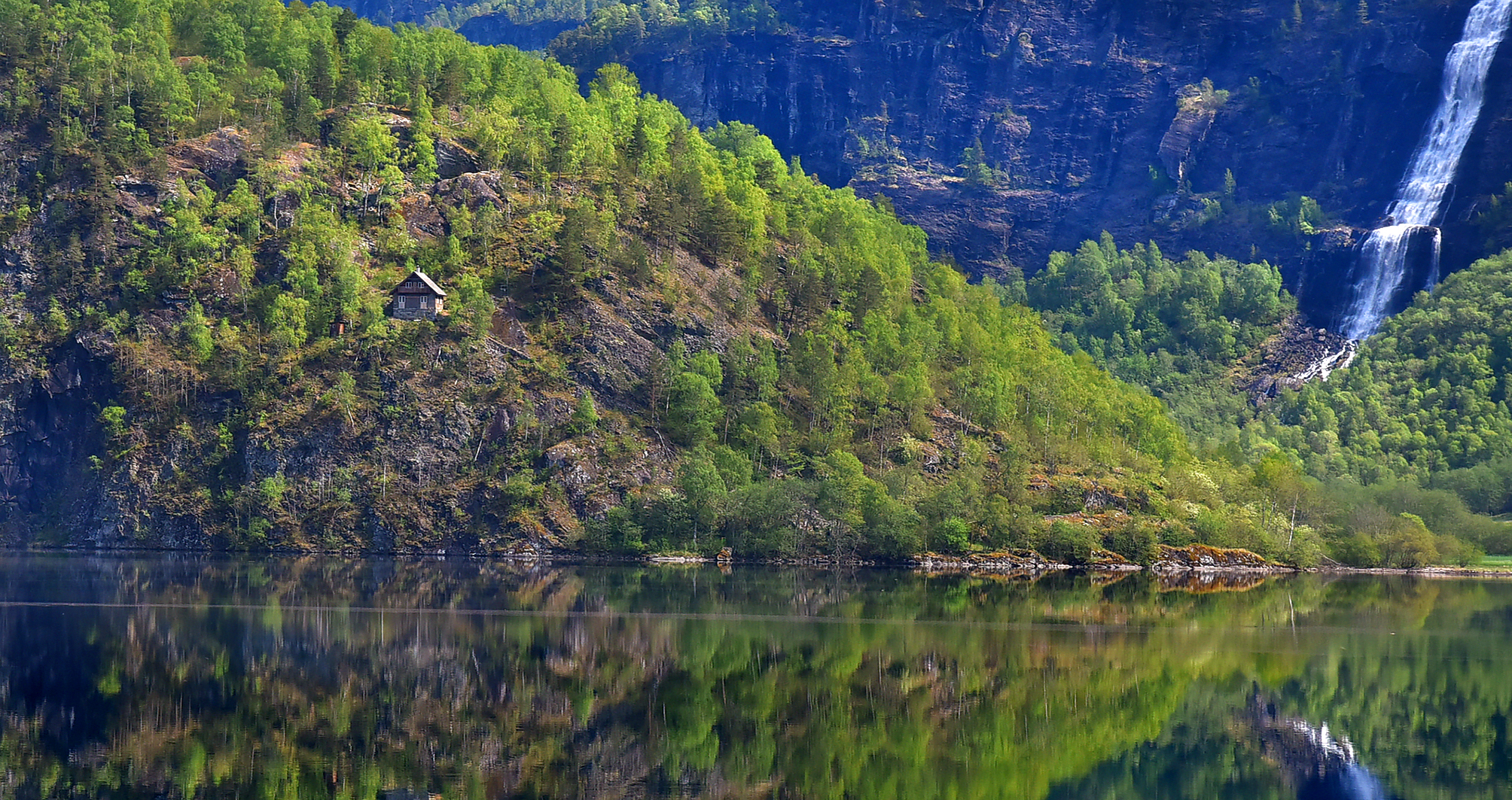
The restored house of Ludwig Wittgenstein in Skjolden.
Credit: Vadim Chuprina
