= Fosselvi =

River in Årdal, Norway

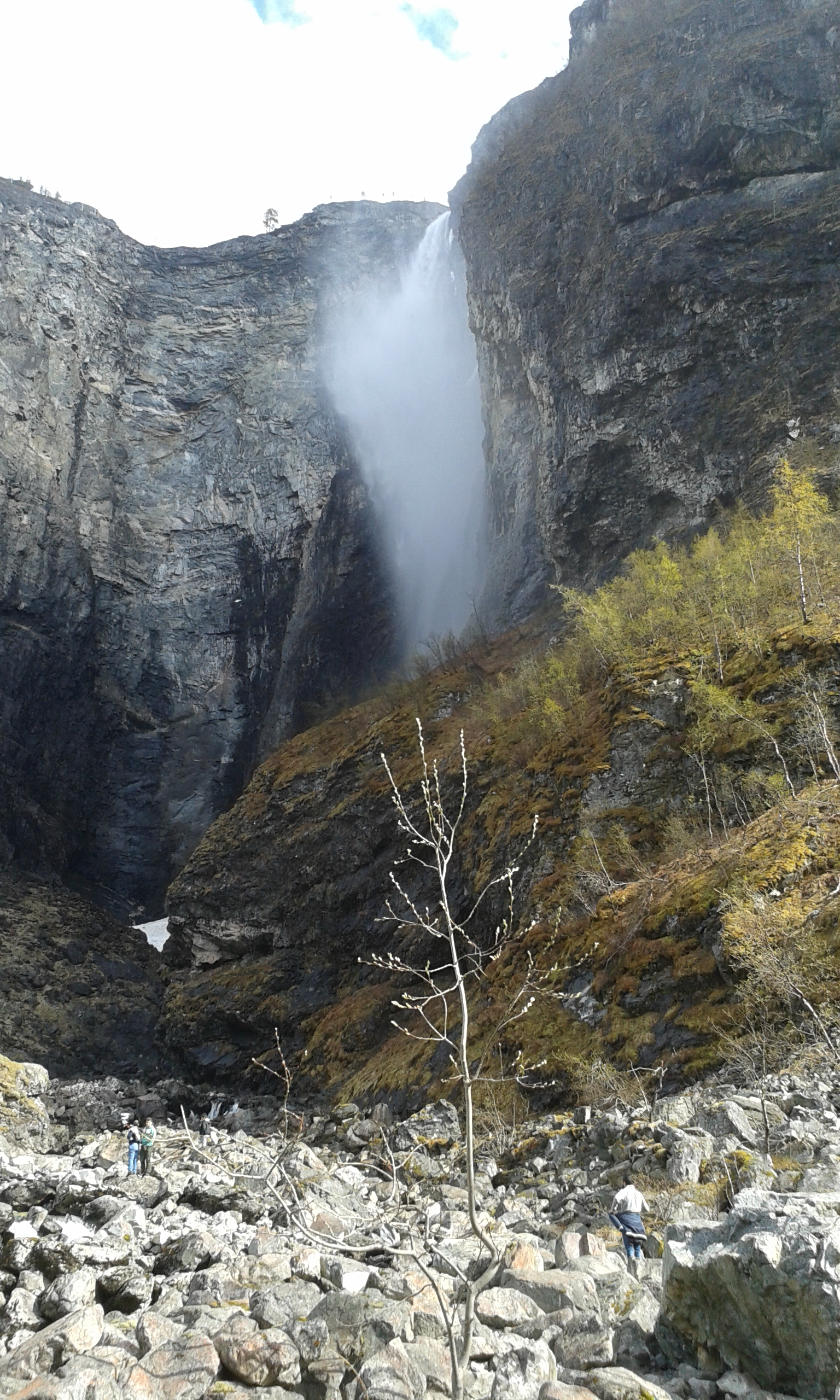
- View of the river Fosselvi and Vettisfossen

Location
- Country: Norway
- County: Vestland
- Municipalities: Årdal Municipality

Physical characteristics
- Source: Vettisfossen
  - location: Utladalen, Årdal, Norway
  - coordinates: 61°22′45″N 07°56′51″E
  - elevation: 501 metres (1,644 ft)
- Mouth: Utla River
  - location: Utladalen, Årdal, Norway
  - coordinates: 61°22′56″N 07°56′19″E
  - elevation: 276 metres (906 ft)
- Length: 473.3 m (1,553 ft)
- Discharge
  - minimum: 4 m^{3}/s (140 cu ft/s)
  - maximum: 14 m^{3}/s (490 cu ft/s)

Fosselvi is a river in Årdal Municipality in Vestland county, Norway. The 473.3-metre (1,553 ft) long river starts at an elevation of 501 metres (1,644 ft) from the Vettisfossen waterfall, assuming rapids and rocks exposed above the flow surface, and reaching towards the river Utla at an elevation of 276 metres (906 ft) in the Utladalen valley below.

== See also ==
- List of rivers in Norway
