= 2013 Valdresekspressen hijacking =

Bus hijacking near Øvre Årdal, Norway

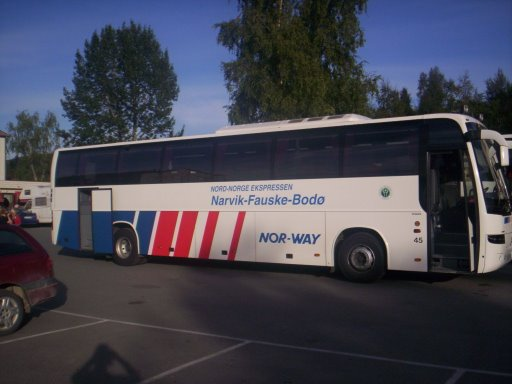
- Bus similar to the bus that was hijacked
- Location: Near Øvre Årdal, Norway
- Date: 4 November 2013; 17.30 (CEST (UTC+1))
- Attack type: Bus hijacking, mass stabbing, triple murder
- Weapon: Knife
- Deaths: 3
- Injuries: 1 (the suspect)
- Perpetrator: Peter Roy Paul Beak
- Motive: Unknown

The 2013 Valdresekspressen hijacking was a hijacking of an express bus running on the Nor-Way Bussekspress Valdresekspressen (Valdres Express) route, which took place east of Øvre Årdal on 4 November 2013. The driver and both passengers were killed.

== Events ==
The bus was travelling on Nor-Way Bussekspress' long-distance Valdresekspressen route between Årdalstangen and Oslo when it was hijacked at about 5.30 pm on Fylkesvei 53 between Øvre Årdal, a village in Årdal Municipality in Vestland county, and Tyin in the neighbouring Vang Municipality in Innlandet county. The driver and both passengers were killed with a knife. The suspect gave himself up voluntarily; he had self-inflicted knife wounds and was taken to a hospital.

Wrongly thinking a tunnel was closed, the police took over an hour to drive to the isolated location; the situation was initially reported as a road accident, and before emergency responders arrived, some passersby had tried unsuccessfully to persuade the man to open the door.

The fire brigade and ambulance service arrived on the scene before the police and captured the suspect. Counter-terrorism police had been alerted but were called off after the suspect was taken into custody.

== Suspect and victims ==
=== Suspect ===
The suspected hijacker was Peter Beak, a man from South Sudan born in 1982 who had applied for asylum in Norway in April 2013. The application was turned down in June on the basis that he had previously applied for asylum in Spain. He was settled in Årdal in August. He hijacked the bus the day before he was to be returned to Spain. However, according to authorities, he had not been informed that he was about to be deported.

According to Frode Forfang, director of the Norwegian Directorate of Immigration, Peter stated in an interview with the police upon arrival in Norway that he had psychiatric problems and cited health problems as grounds for seeking asylum in Norway. The authorities had not considered that his behaviour raised security concerns.

=== Victims ===
- Margaret Molland Sanden, 19, of Årdalstangen, a student at Oslo University College
- Brahim Khouya, 53, a Swedish citizen returning home to Gothenburg after working in Årdal
- Arve Kvernhaug, 55, of Bagn, the bus driver

== Investigation and judicial proceedings ==
Peter Beak was held at a psychiatric clinic in Bergen and was scheduled to undergo a preliminary hearing with the Criminal Investigation Service on 14 November, but declined to answer questions at that time. As of April 2014, he had not made a statement to police, had been held in prison and under observation in a medical facility, and was expected to be tried in autumn 2014.

In September 2014, he died from injuries sustained when he jumped off a roof in prison.

== Reactions ==
Following the triple homicide, there were reports of insults to other asylum-seekers living at the centre in Årdal, and the local affiliate of Nor-Way Bussekspress made an agreement with the centre operator that asylum-seekers would not travel on that route for a week, for the drivers' sake. Some demanded psychiatric screening of asylum-seekers.

On the afternoon of 16 November 2013, Prime Minister Erna Solberg visited Årdal and laid down flowers and lit candles to commemorate the victims of the triple homicide.

The police were criticised for taking so long to reach the scene; there have been calls for a national minimum standard response time and other changes. On 16 November the Norwegian Broadcasting Corporation published a report by the district police chief, Ronny Iden.

== 2003 hijacking ==
An earlier hijacking on the Valdresekspressen took place on 16 February 2003; a 26-year-old Ethiopian man killed the driver, 39-year-old Audun Bøland, and wounded some of the 34 passengers. He had previously killed an asylum-seeker at an asylum centre in Fagernes.
