= Tyin Hydroelectric Power Station =

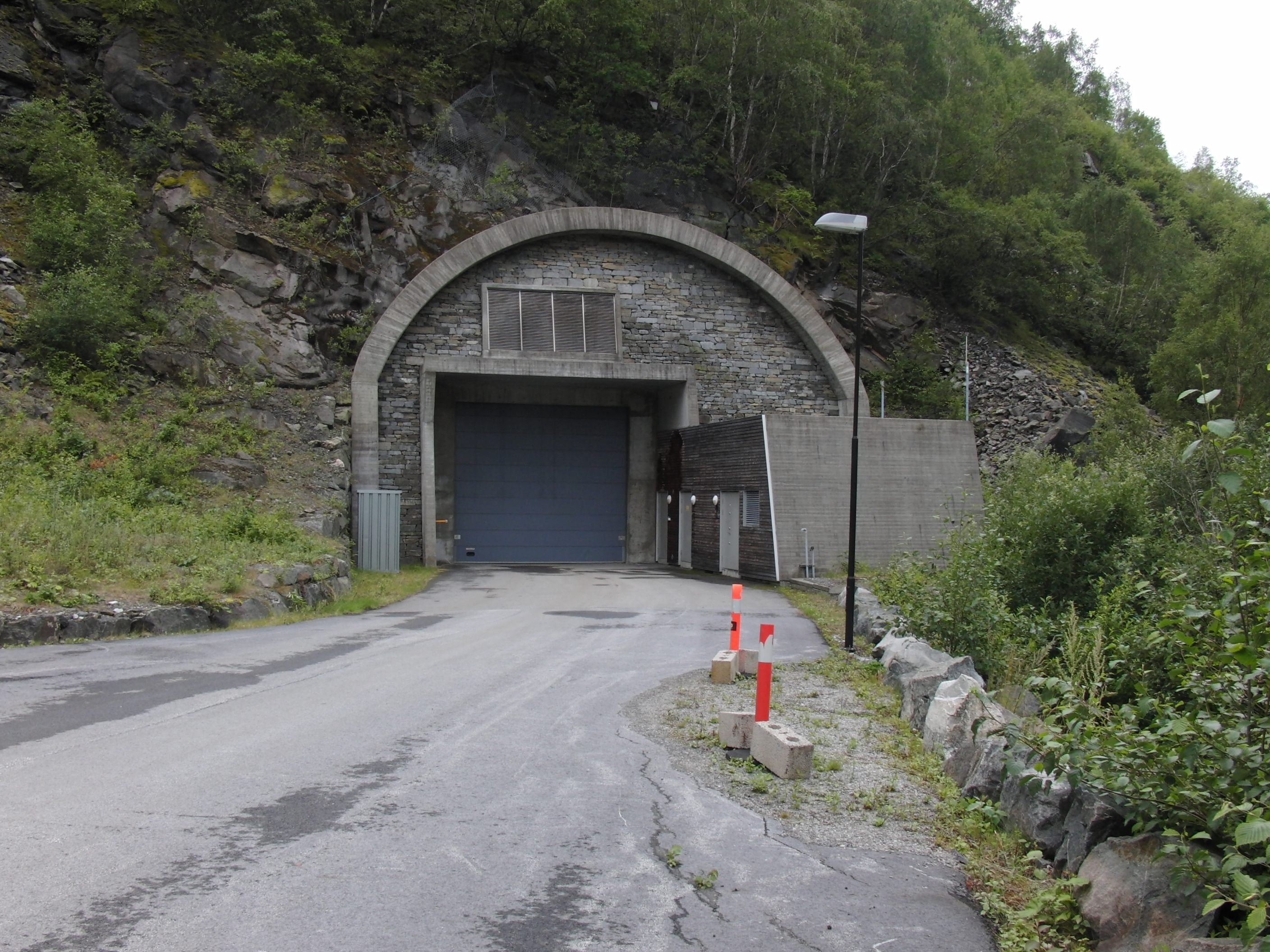
- Tyin Hydroelectric Power Station
- Interactive map of Tyin Hydroelectric Power Station
- Official name: Tyin kraftverk
- Country: Norway
- Location: Årdal Municipality
- Coordinates: 61°18′37″N 7°49′53″E
- Opening date: 1 October 2004; 21 years ago
- Owner: Norsk Hydro

Upper reservoir
- Creates: Tyin

Lower reservoir
- Creates: Øvre Årdal

Power Station
- Hydraulic head: 1,040 metres (3,410 ft)
- Installed capacity: 380 MW
- Capacity factor: 42.1%
- Annual generation: 1,400 GW·h

The Tyin Power Station (Norwegian: Tyin kraftverk) is a hydroelectric power station located in Årdal Municipality in Vestland, Norway. It operates at an installed capacity of 380 megawatts (510,000 hp), with an average annual production of about 1,400 gigawatt-hours (5,000 TJ).
