= Hjelledalstinden =

Mountain in Årdal, Norway

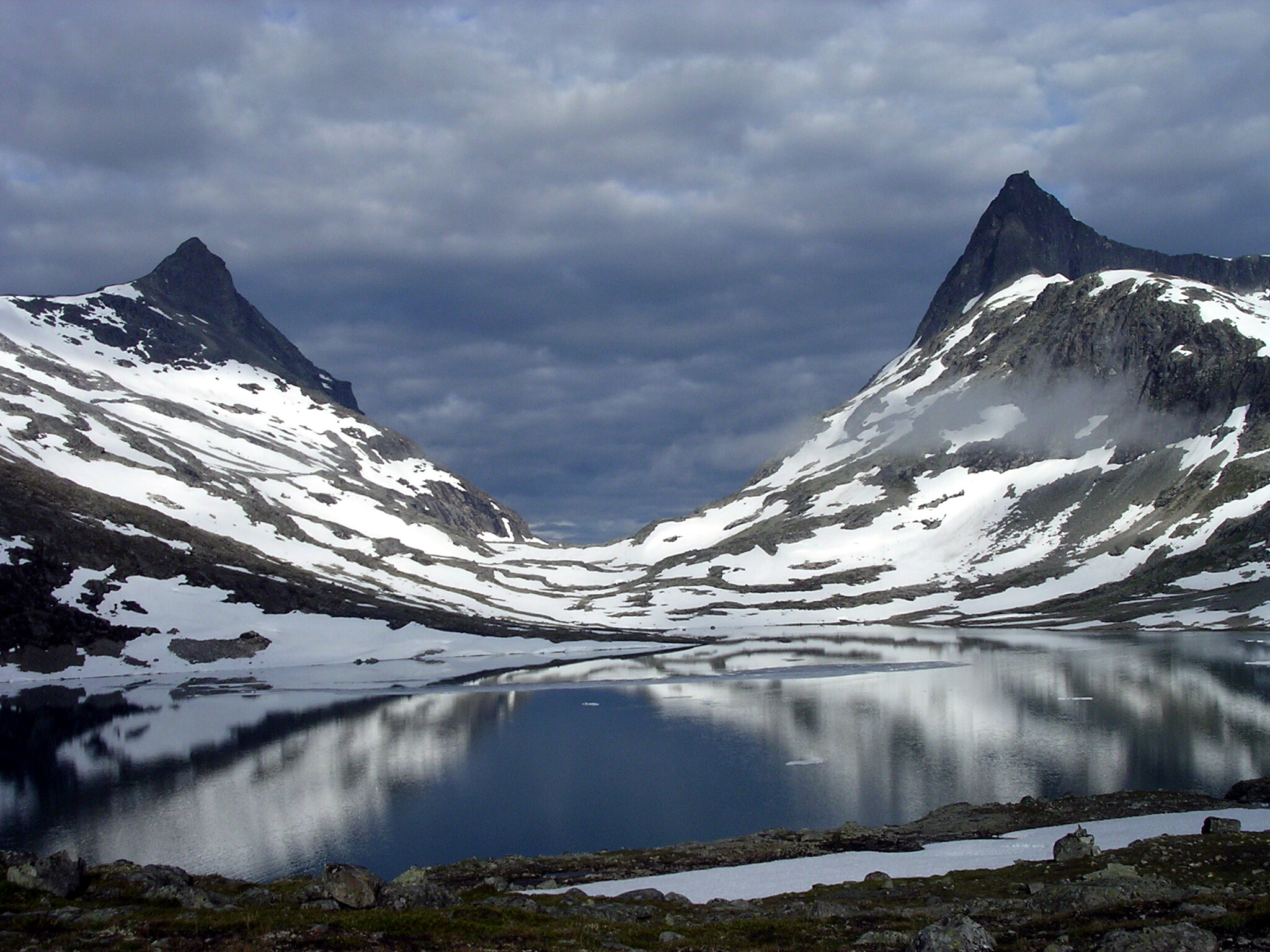
- Hjelledalstind (left) and Falketind (right)

Highest point
- Elevation: 1,989 m (6,526 ft)
- Prominence: 697 m (2,287 ft)
- Parent peak: Galdhøpiggen
- Isolation: 1.8 km (1.1 mi) to Falketind
- Coordinates: 61°22′08″N 8°05′54″E

Geography
- Location: Vestland, Norway
- Parent range: Jotunheimen
- Topo map: 1517 I Tyin

Climbing
- First ascent: 1884: Carl Hall, Mathias Soggemoen

Hjelledalstinden is a mountain in Årdal Municipality in Vestland county, Norway, in the Jotunheimen mountain range. It was first climbed in 1884 by Carl Hall and Mathias Soggemoen.

Hjelledalstinden is located on the southern side of the valley Morka-Koldedalen, facing Falketind to the north.
