= Avdalen =

Valley in Årdal, Norway

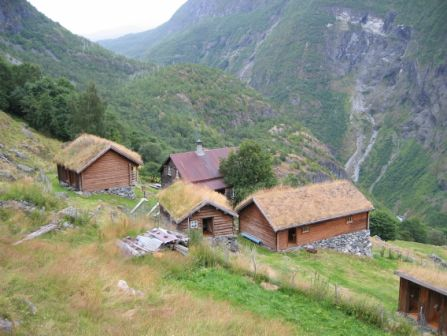
- View of a farm in Avdalen
- Floor elevation: 1,140 m (3,740 ft)
- Length: 1 kilometre (0.62 mi)

Geology
- Type: River valley

Geography
- Location: Vestland, Norway
- Coordinates: 61°13′39″N 07°47′11″E
- Interactive map of Avdalen

Avdalen is a small, 1-kilometre (0.62 mi) long side valley located off of the main Utladalen valley in Årdal Municipality in Vestland county, Norway. It is located within the Utladalen Landscape Protection Area, which was established along with the adjacent Jotunheim National Park in 1980 and covers about 300 square kilometres (120 sq mi). A blues concert is held at Avdalen each year in June. It has become increasingly popular.

The Årdal mountain touring club maintains a staffed mountain hut at the former Avdal farm (Avdalen gård). The Avdal farm was first occupied in 16th century and was vacated in 1962. The farm is located above the magnificent Avdalsfossen waterfall, about 3 kilometres (1.9 mi) south of the Vetti farm. The farm has undergone a restoration, and currently provides meals as well as accommodation for tourists. It can be reached by a 2 kilometres (1.2 mi) car ride from the village of Øvre Årdal to Hjelle, followed by a 45-minute hike. The last part of the hike is very steep and illustrates the challenge of daily life for the former residents.
