= Vetti =

Vetti may refer to:

- Vetti, Norway, a farm area in Årdal, Norway
- House of the Vettii, a Roman house in Pompeii
- Vēṭṭi (or dhoti), a traditional and professional attire worn by men during festivals and official occasions in India
- Vetti or Jajmani system, a former feudal system in India where lower castes served the upper castes without any pay
