= Olav Bjørkum =

Norwegian politician

Olav Dominikusson Bjørkum (1859–1936) was a Norwegian politician for the Liberal Party.

He graduated from Stord Teachers College in 1879, and worked as a school teacher from 1880 to 1882 before turning to farming.

As a politician he was a member of the municipal council of Aardal Municipality, and served as mayor from 1899 to 1904. He served as a deputy representative to the Norwegian Parliament during the term 1900–1903.
