= Farnes Church =

Church in Vestland, Norway

- Farnes kyrkje
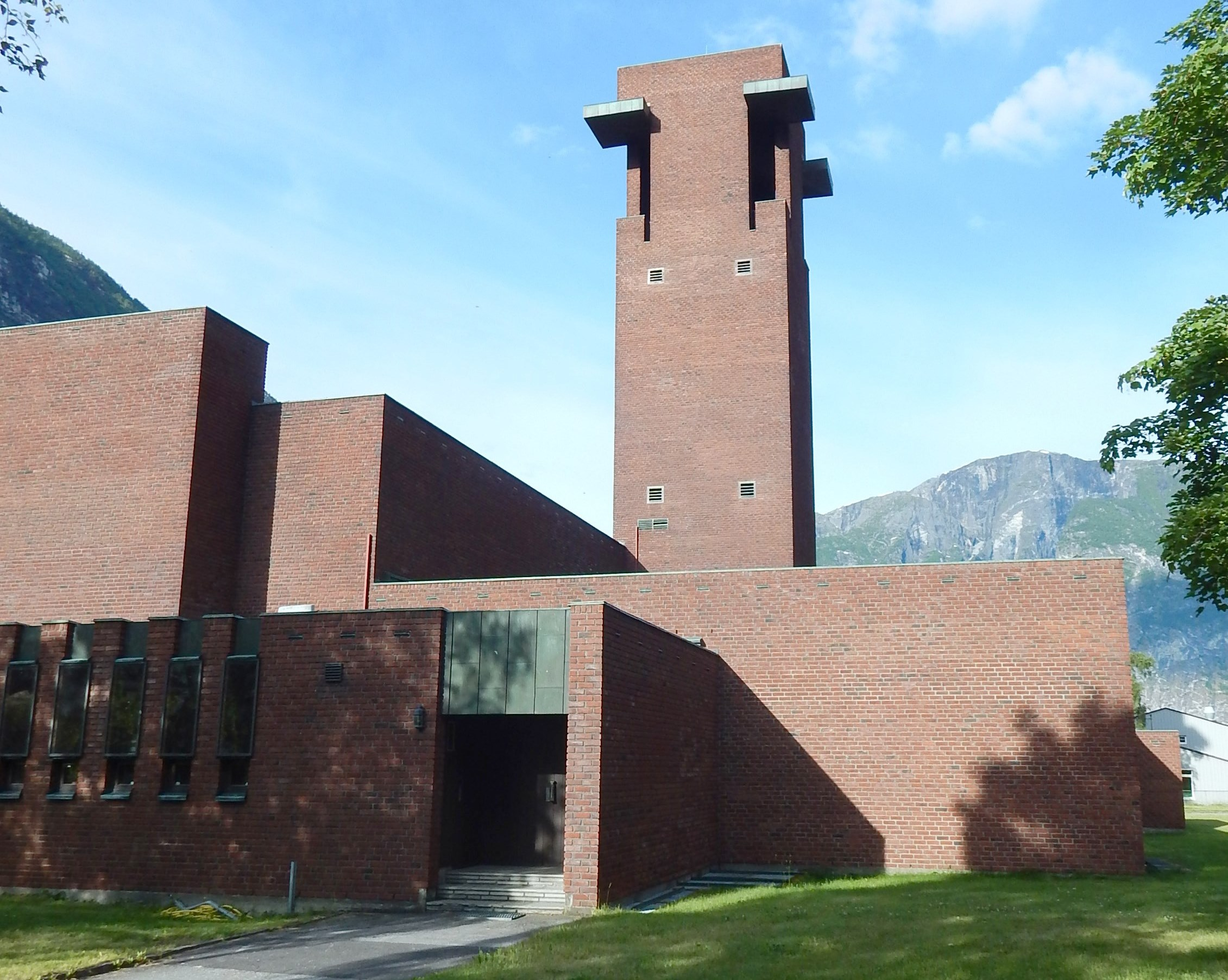
- View of the church
- Farnes Church
- 61°18′37″N 7°48′04″E
- Location: Årdal Municipality, Vestland
- Country: Norway
- Denomination: Church of Norway
- Previous denomination: Catholic Church
- Churchmanship: Evangelical Lutheran

History
- Status: Parish church
- Founded: 1970
- Consecrated: 12 April 1970

Architecture
- Functional status: Active
- Architect: Per Solemslie
- Architectural type: Cruciform
- Style: Modern
- Completed: 1970 (56 years ago)

Specifications
- Capacity: 648
- Materials: Brick

Administration
- Diocese: Bjørgvin bispedømme
- Deanery: Sogn prosti
- Parish: Øvre Årdal
- Norwegian Cultural Heritage Site
- Type: Church
- Status: Not protected
- ID: 84116

Farnes Church (Norwegian: Farnes kyrkje) is a parish church of the Church of Norway in Årdal Municipality in Vestland county, Norway. It is located in the village of Øvre Årdal. It is the church for the Øvre Årdal parish which is part of the Sogn prosti (deanery) in the Diocese of Bjørgvin.

The large, red, brick church was built in a modern, cruciform design in 1970 using plans drawn up by the architect Per Solemslie from the architecture firm Arnstein Arneberg. The church seats about 648 people.

== History ==
Historically, the only church in Årdal was the old Årdal Church located in Årdalstangen. In 1867, the old stave church in Årdalstangen was going to be torn down, the local priest and the bishop both wanted a new replacement church to be built in the village of Øvre Årdal. The municipal council said no, and a new church was built in Årdalstangen.

After World War II, the growing community of Øvre Årdal continued to ask for their own church. A small building in Øvre Årdal began to be used as an interim church in 1954. Planning for a permanent church began in the 1960s. Originally, the designs were for a very traditional granite building with a tower and spire, but the final design was a much more modern, brick building.

The large modern church was designed with a 30-metre (98 ft) tall bell tower above the entrance. Construction began in June 1968. The church was consecrated on 12 April 1970 by the bishop Per Juvkam. When the new church opened, the Årdal parish was divided into two, with Årdal Church serving the southwest part of the municipality and this new church serving the northeastern part.

== See also ==
- List of churches in Bjørgvin
