= Falketind =

Mountain in Vestland, Norway

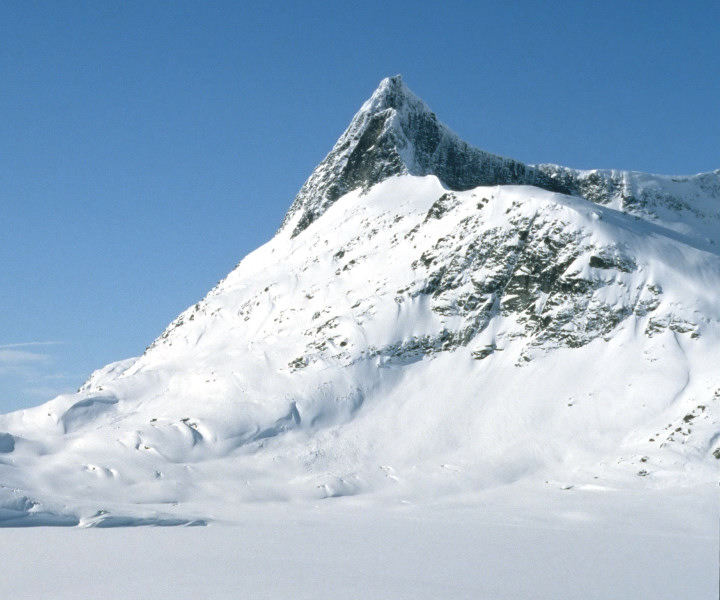
- View of the mountain from the east

Highest point
- Elevation: 2,068 m (6,785 ft)
- Prominence: 201 m (659 ft)
- Parent peak: Stølsnostinden
- Isolation: 1.8 km (1.1 mi) to Stølsnostinden
- Coordinates: 61°23′05″N 8°05′48″E

Geography
- Location: Vestland, Norway
- Parent range: Jotunheimen
- Topo map: 1517 I Tyin

Climbing
- First ascent: 12 July 1820: Christian Peder Bianco Boeck, Baltazar Mathias Keilhau, Ole Urdi

Falketind is a mountain in Årdal Municipality in Vestland county, Norway. It is located in the Jotunheimen mountain range inside the Utladalen Landscape Protection Area. The mountain is 7 kilometres (4.3 mi) east of the old mountain farm, Vettismorki, and 7.5 kilometres (4.7 mi) northwest of the lake Tyin.

The 1820 ascent was the first known ascent on an alpine mountain in Norway. A climbing party which included Baltazar Mathias Keilhau and Christian Peder Bianco Boeck went via Snøggeken (Falkbreen) and the northern ridge. At that time the mountain was named Koldedalstinden, but Aasmund Olavsson Vinje renamed the mountain Falketind more than fifty years later. In retrospect, the expedition leading to the first ascent became known as the "discovery of Jotunheimen" (Jotunheimens oppdagelse).

== Name ==
The first element is falk which means "falcon" and the last element is tind which means "mountain peak".

== Related reading ==
- Ryvarden, Leif (2007). Jotunheimen. Naturen, opplevelsene, historien. N.W. Damm & Søn AS. ISBN 978-82-04-10519-6.
