= Fardalen =

Valley in Årdal, Norway

- Floor elevation: 580 m (1,900 ft)
- Length: 8 km (5.0 mi)
- Width: 1.2 km (0.75 mi)

Geology
- Type: River valley

Geography
- Location: Vestland, Norway
- Coordinates: 61°20′21″N 07°45′38″E
- Interactive map of Fardalen

Fardalen is a valley stretching northwest from the village of Øvre Årdal in Årdal Municipality in Vestland county, Norway. The valley branches off of the main Utladalen valley. The road with the highest elevation in Norway has its path through this valley, reaching more than 1,400 metres (4,600 ft) above sea level, passing close to the famous mountain Storen. The road leads to the Bergsdalen valley in Luster Municipality.

The valley has been inhabited since circa 400-500 AD. In the winter there are lighted ski tracks in Fardalen.
