= Blåberg =

Mountain in Årdal, Norway

Highest point
- Elevation: 835 m (2,740 ft)
- Coordinates: 61°18′51″N 7°45′45″E

Geography
- Location: Vestland, Norway

Blåberg is a mountain on the west side of the village of Øvre Årdal in Årdal Municipality in Vestland county, Norway. It is a well-known tourist hiking spot and it is also known for its copper mines. It was sometimes called the mine mountain.

Blåberg was the site of copper mining starting in the 18th century when rich sources of copper were found, and mining began on the mountain and surrounding valleys around the Årdalsfjorden which is part of the Sognefjord.

== Media gallery ==
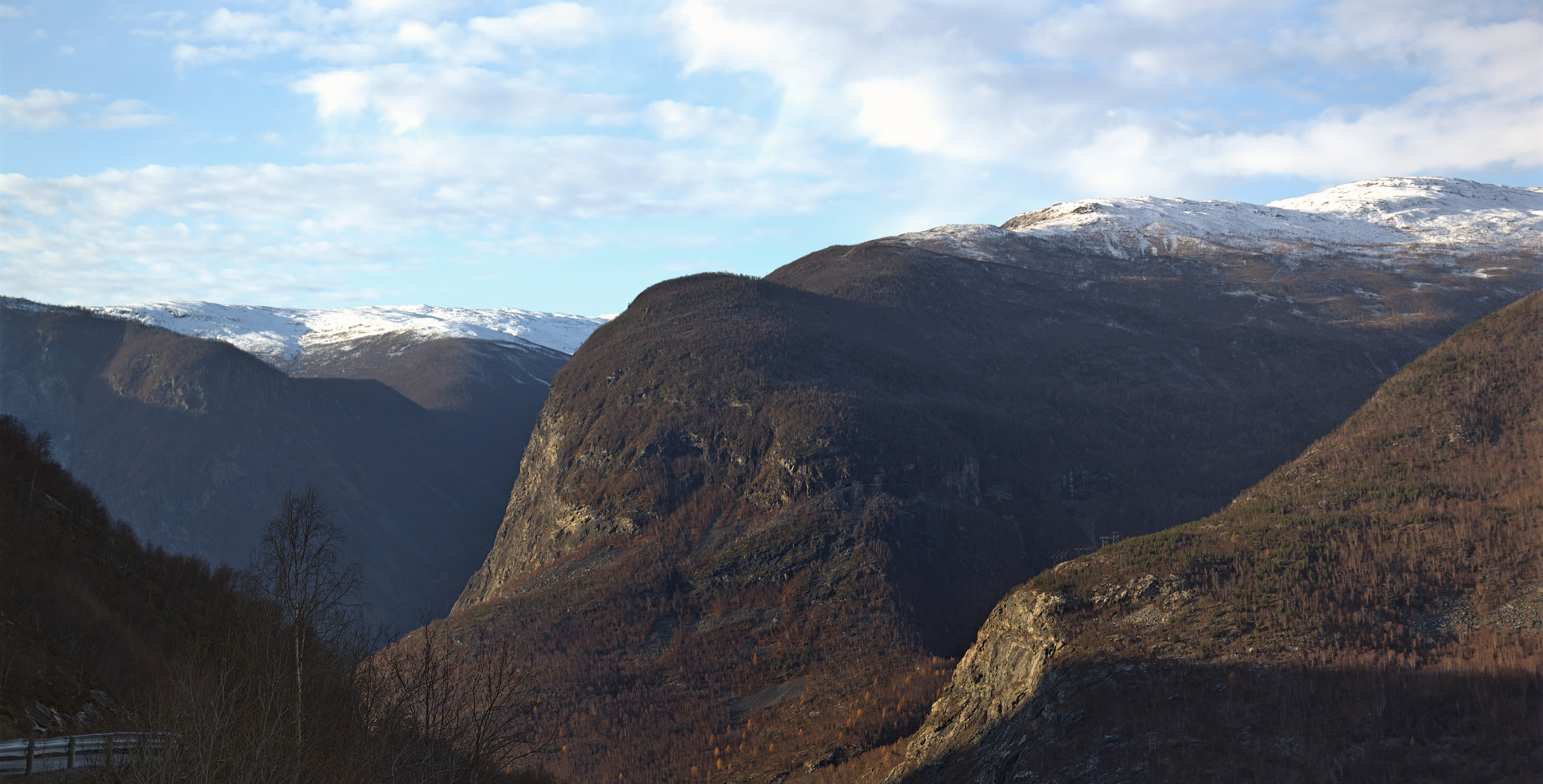
Blåberg seen from Norwegian County Road 53

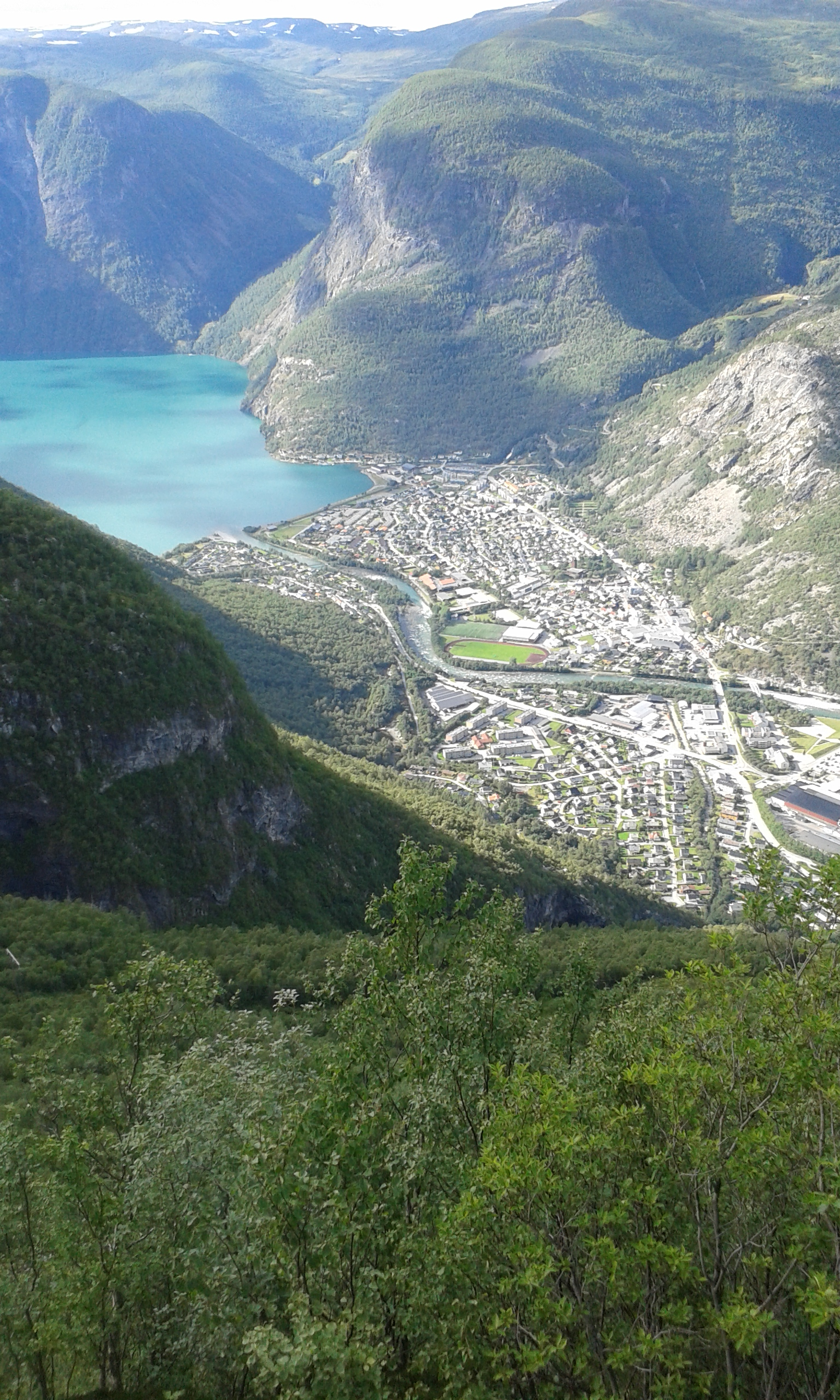
Øvre Årdal with Blåberg in the background

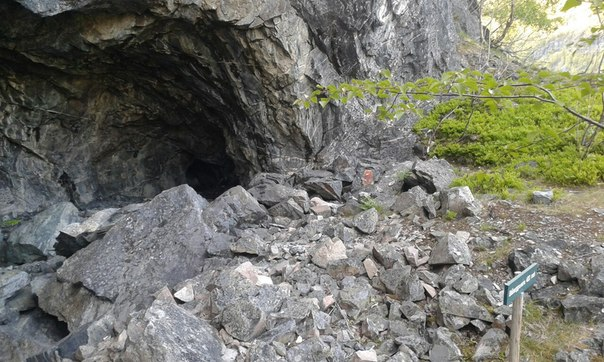
One of the caves of the Blåberg rock

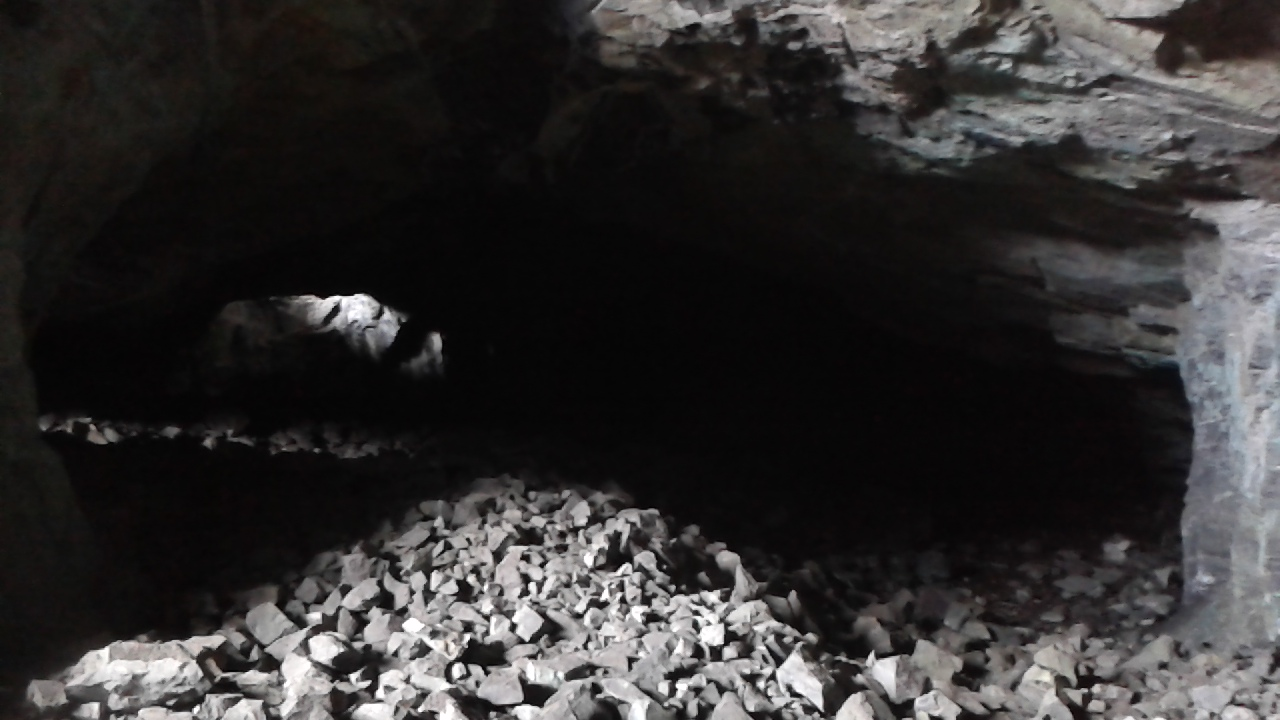
Inside Blåberg
