= Utladalen =

Valley in Vestland, Norway

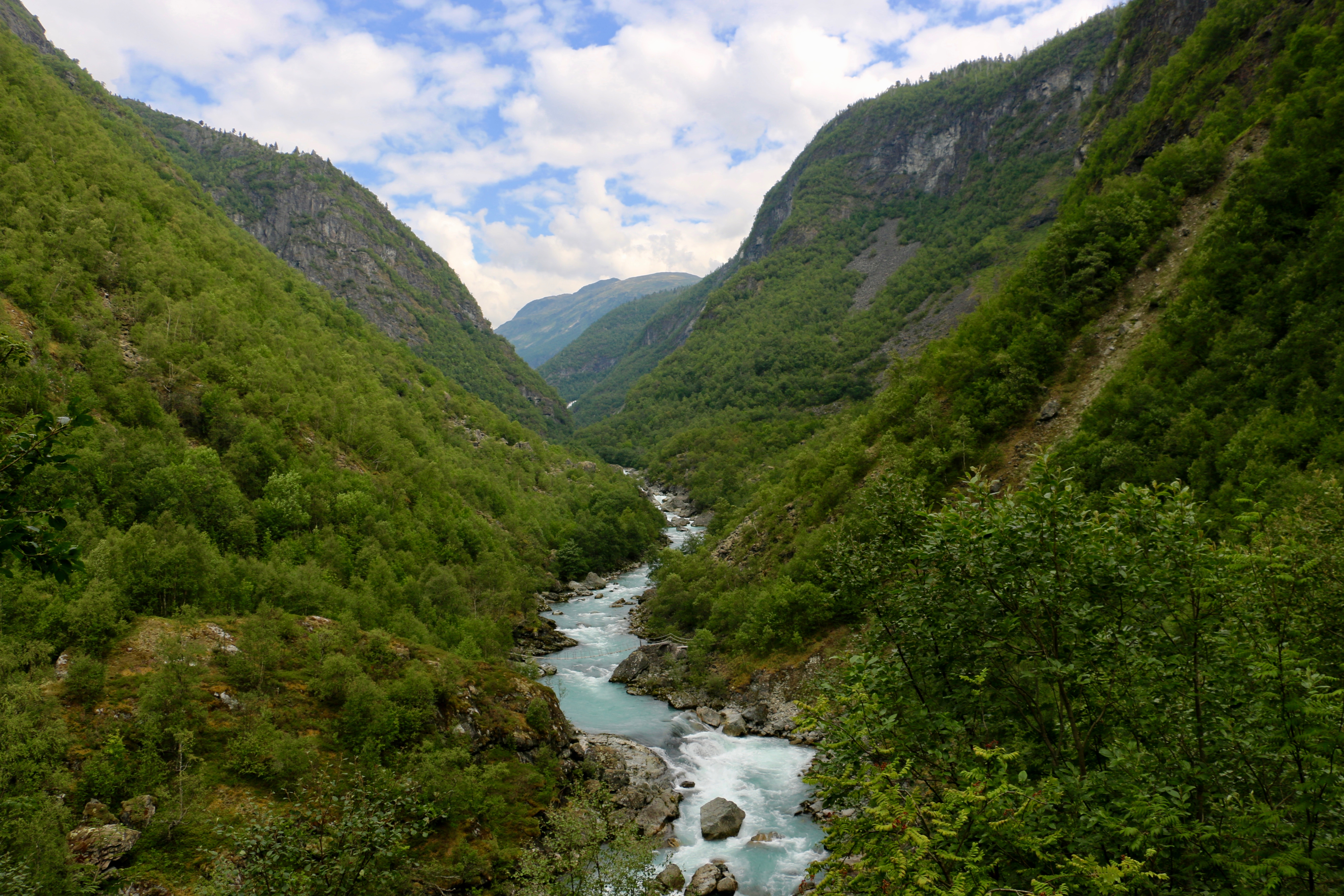
- Floor elevation: 716 m (2,349 ft)
- Length: 25 km (16 mi)
- Width: 2.5 km (1.6 mi)

Geology
- Type: River valley

Geography
- Location: Vestland, Norway
- Population centers: Vetti, Vettismorki, Øvre Årdal
- Coordinates: 61°24′00″N 07°58′15″E
- Interactive map of Utladalen

Utladalen is a valley in Årdal Municipality in Vestland county, Norway. It stretches north from the village of Øvre Årdal into the neighboring Luster Municipality. The Avdalen and Fardalen valleys branch off of the main Utladalen valley.

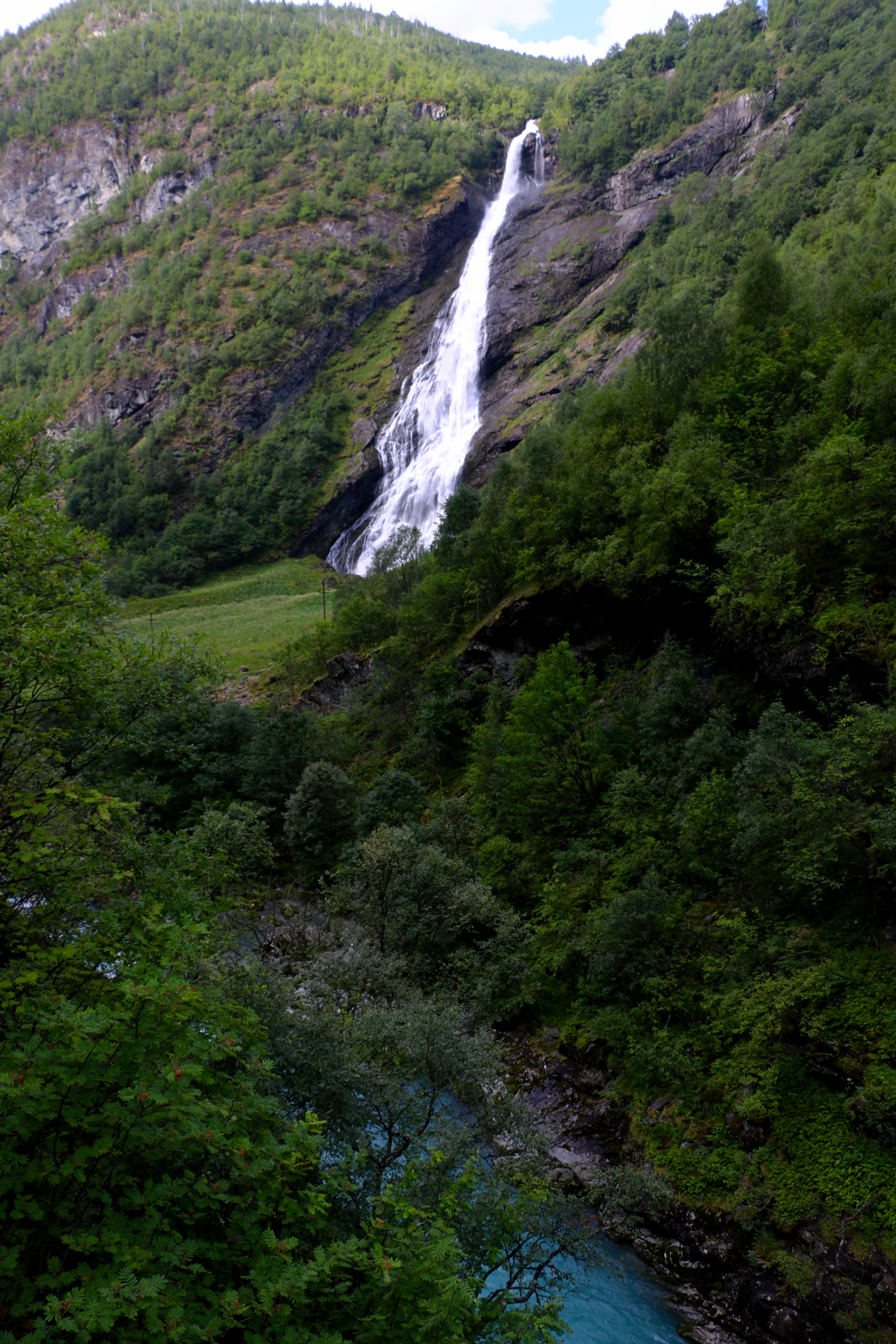
Avdalsfossen, one of the several waterfalls in the valley.

Utladalen is Norway's deepest valley. The main valley, when measuring from Øvre Årdal is 25 kilometres (16 mi) long and is surrounded by dozens of mountain peaks that are all more than 2,000 metres (6,600 ft) in height. From Øvre Årdal, a comfortable walking road has been constructed, funded by voluntary contributions. The road passes through the Vetti farm area and crosses the Utla river on four spectacular bridges. The walking path ends at one of Norway's tallest waterfalls, Vettisfossen.

Since Utladalen is considered to be unique in Norway and internationally, the Utladalen Landscape Protection Area was established along with the adjacent Jotunheim National Park in 1980 and covers about 300 square kilometres (120 sq mi). It includes both the valley and areas that extend both westward and northward to Jotunheim National Park, and eastward to lake Tyin.

== Name ==
The official form on maps is Utledalen. The first element is the genitive of the river name Utla and the last element is the finite form of dal which means "dale" or "valley". The river name is probably derived from the verb utle which means "drift" or "fly"—the many waterfalls of the river creates a mist in the bottom of the valley.
