= Øvre Årdal =

Village in Vestland, Norway

- Village
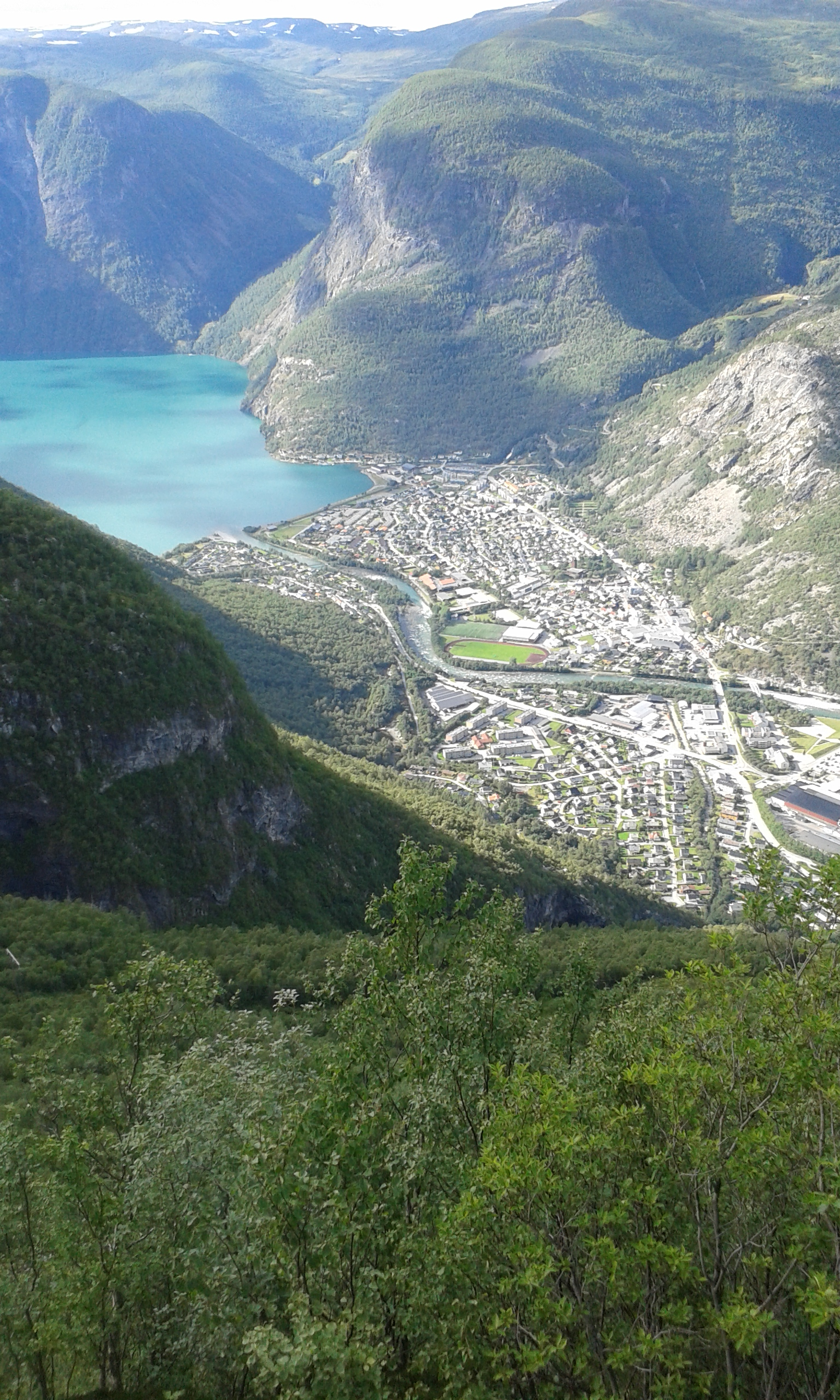
- View of Øvre Årdal
- Interactive map of Øvre Årdal
- Location within Vestland Location within Norway
- Coordinates: 61.3089°N 7.8028°E
- Country: Norway
- Region: Western Norway
- County: Vestland
- District: Sogn
- Municipality: Årdal Municipality

Area
  - Total: 1.89 km^{2} (0.73 sq mi)
- Elevation: 11 m (36 ft)

Population (2025)
  - Total: 3,094
  - Density: 1,637/km^{2} (4,240/sq mi)
- Time zone: UTC+01:00 (CET)
  - Summer (DST): UTC+02:00 (CEST)
- Post Code: 6884 Øvre Årdal

Øvre Årdal is a village in Årdal Municipality in Vestland county, Norway. It is the larger of the two primary villages in Årdal Municipality. The village is situated at the northern end of the 9-kilometre (5.6 mi) long lake Årdalsvatnet, with the village of Årdalstangen at the southern end. The 1.89-square-kilometre (470-acre) village has a population (2024) of 3,094 and a population density of 1,637 inhabitants per square kilometre (4,240/sq mi).

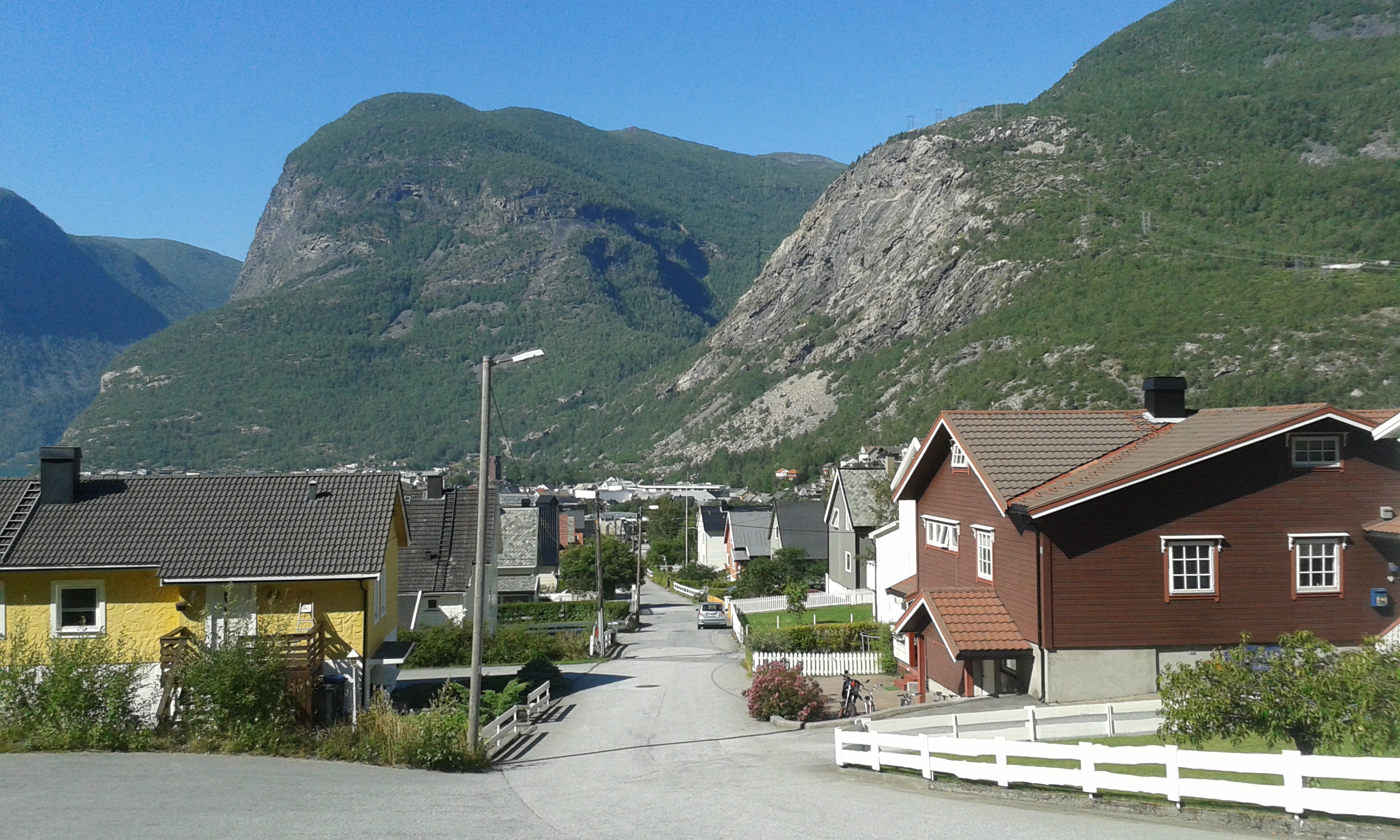
View of Blåberg from Øvre Årdal

Farnes Church is located in this village. The road Tindevegen goes from Øvre Årdal, through the Fardalen valley to the village of Turtagrø in Luster Municipality. It's one of the highest elevation roads in Norway. There is also a road which goes south past the lake Tyin to the European route E16 highway which goes through Valdres to Oslo.

Øvre Årdal is the starting point for tours into the nearby Utladalen Landscape Protection Area and Jotunheimen National Park. There are trips to the Utladalen and Avdalen valleys, to the mountain Falketind, to the Vettisfossen waterfall, and to the historic farms of Vetti, Vettismorki, and Avdalen.

Norsk Hydro has an aluminium smelting plant which is a major employer in the area.

Årdal FK is an association football club which plays at Jotun stadium in Øvre Årdal.
