= Vettisfossen =

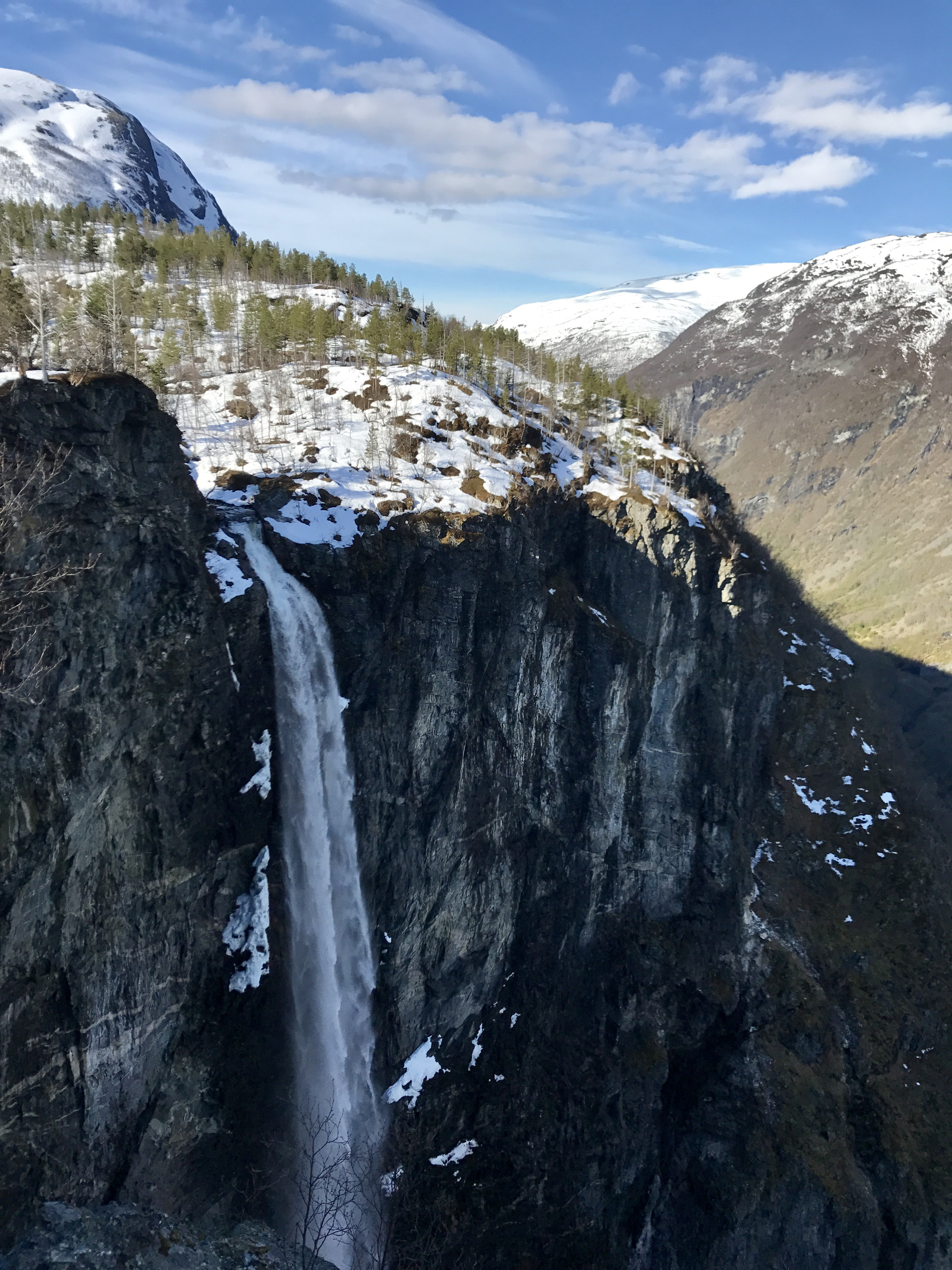
- View of Vettisfossen
- Interactive map of Vettisfossen
- Location: Vestland, Norway
- Coordinates: 61.37913°N 7.94758°E
- Type: Plunge
- Elevation: 500 m (1,600 ft)
- Total height: 275 m (902 ft)
- Number of drops: 1
- Longest drop: 275 m (902 ft)
- Average width: 23 m (75 ft)
- Run: 3 m (9.8 ft)
- Watercourse: Morkaelvi
- Average flow rate: 1 to 4 m^{3}/s (35 to 141 cu ft/s)
- World height ranking: 284

Vettisfossen is one of Norway's tallest waterfalls, and the 284th tallest in the world. It is located in the Jotunheimen mountain range inside the Utladalen Landscape Protection Area in Årdal Municipality in Vestland county, Norway. The waterfall has a single drop of 275 metres (902 ft) that is nearly vertical. The waterfall is about 23 metres (75 ft) wide and has an average flow of 1 to 4 cubic metres per second (35 to 141 cu ft/s).

Vettisfossen is the tallest free-falling waterfall in Europe and in Norway which consists of only one drop, that is entirely free-falling, is not regulated and flows with a considerable volume.

== How to reach ==
The waterfall can be accessed by a walking tour of two to three hours from the village of Øvre Årdal up the Utladalen valley; locally this is known as an easy walk. The name of the waterfall comes from the Vetti farm, which is located near the base of the waterfall. The mountain farm Vettismorki is also located nearby, just above the falls.

From Vetti gard the trail to Vettisfossen becomes much more rocky. The trail drops back down to the Utla river and follows along the rocky bank for about 1 kilometre (0.62 mi) to the outwash plain at the base of the Vettisfossen (the left side of the river Fosselvi). The trail basically ends there. But if one wants to see Vettisfossen waterfall, one can do it only from the opposite side of Fosselvi river, but under no circumstances should attempts be made to cross the river outside of the absolute lowest flow periods.

== Media gallery ==
Video of Vettisfossen.

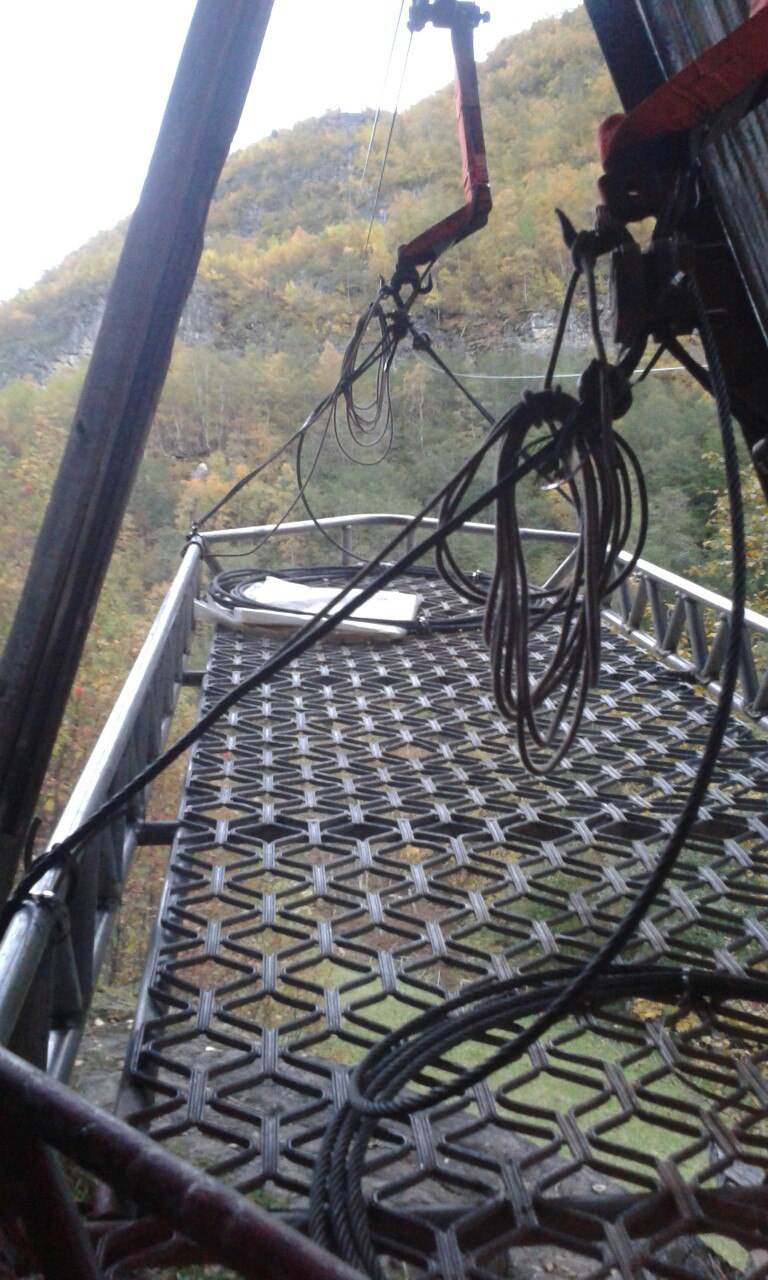
Block and tackle system to lift or pull heavy loads from Vettisfossen or Vettismorki

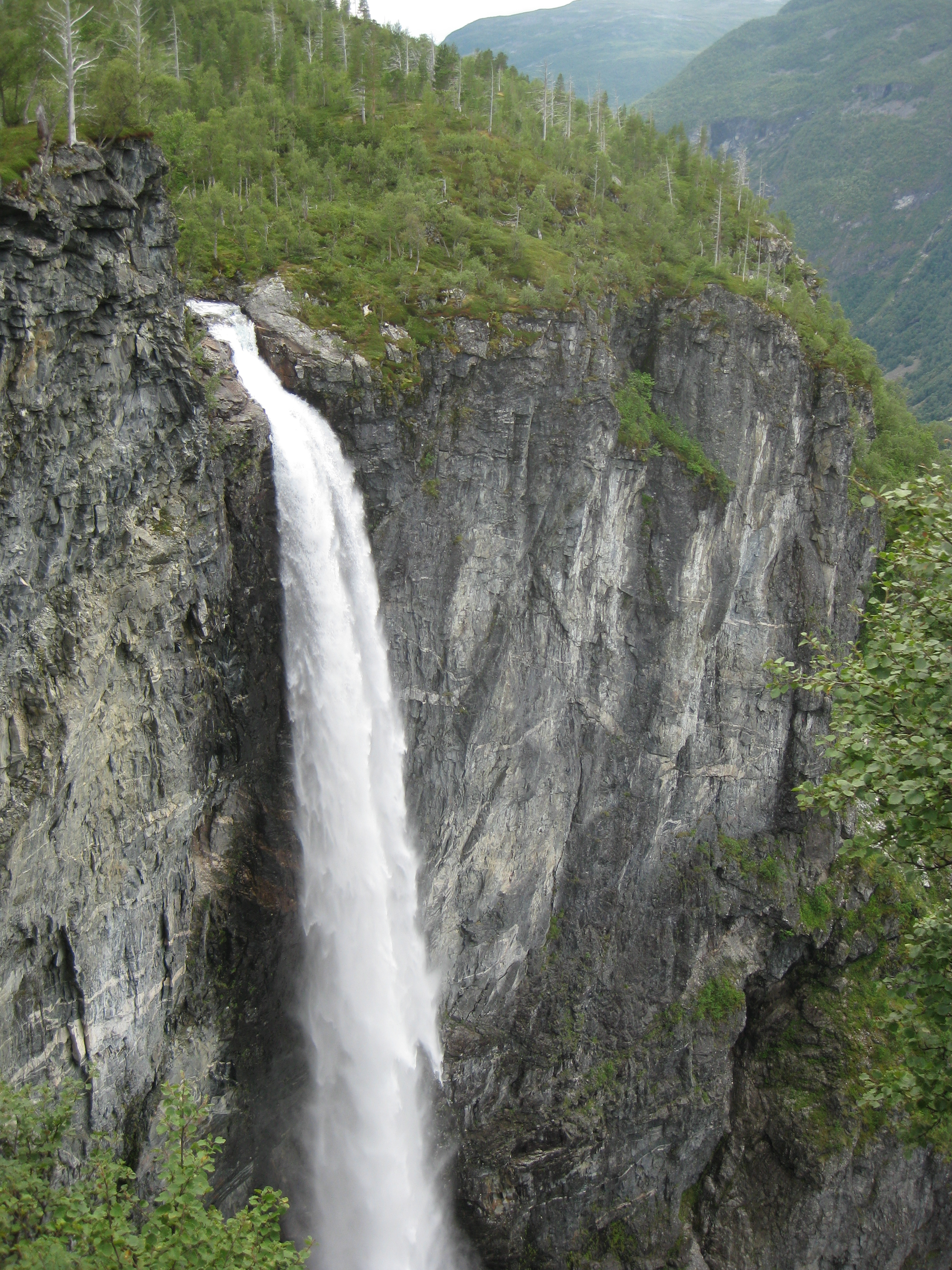

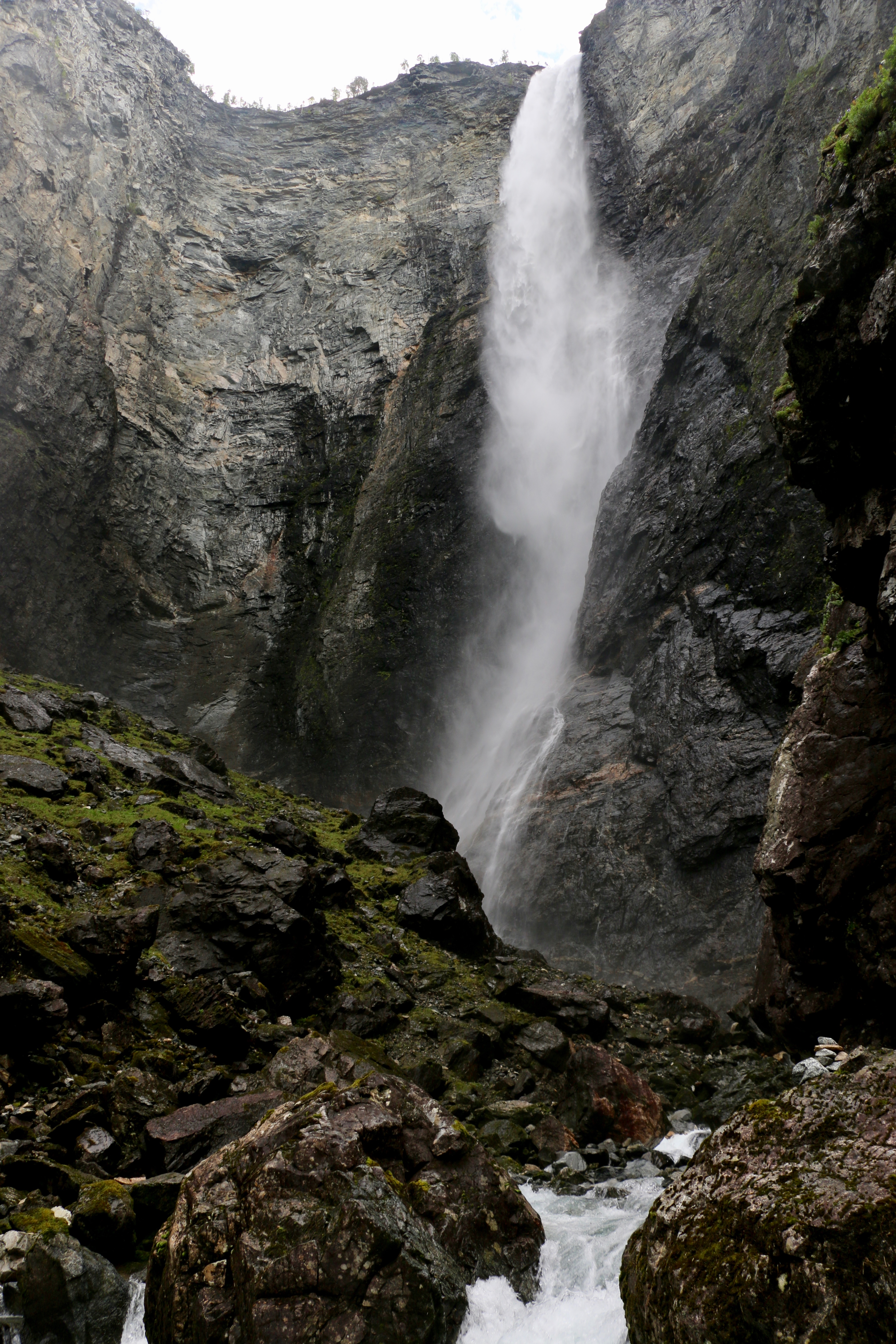

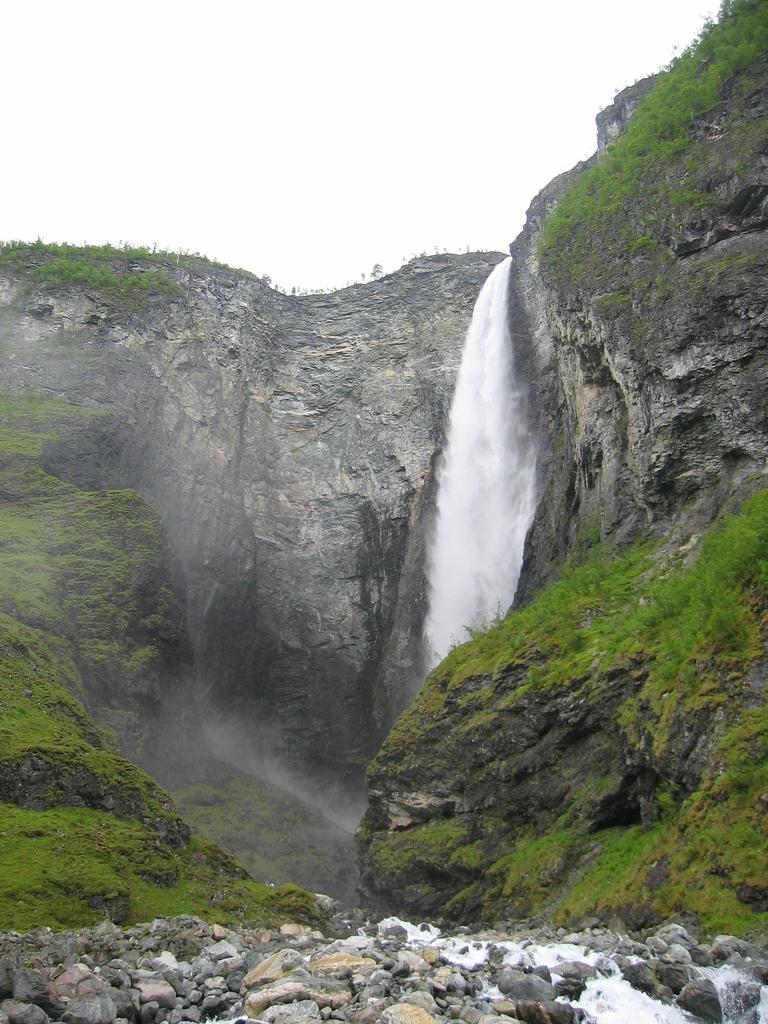

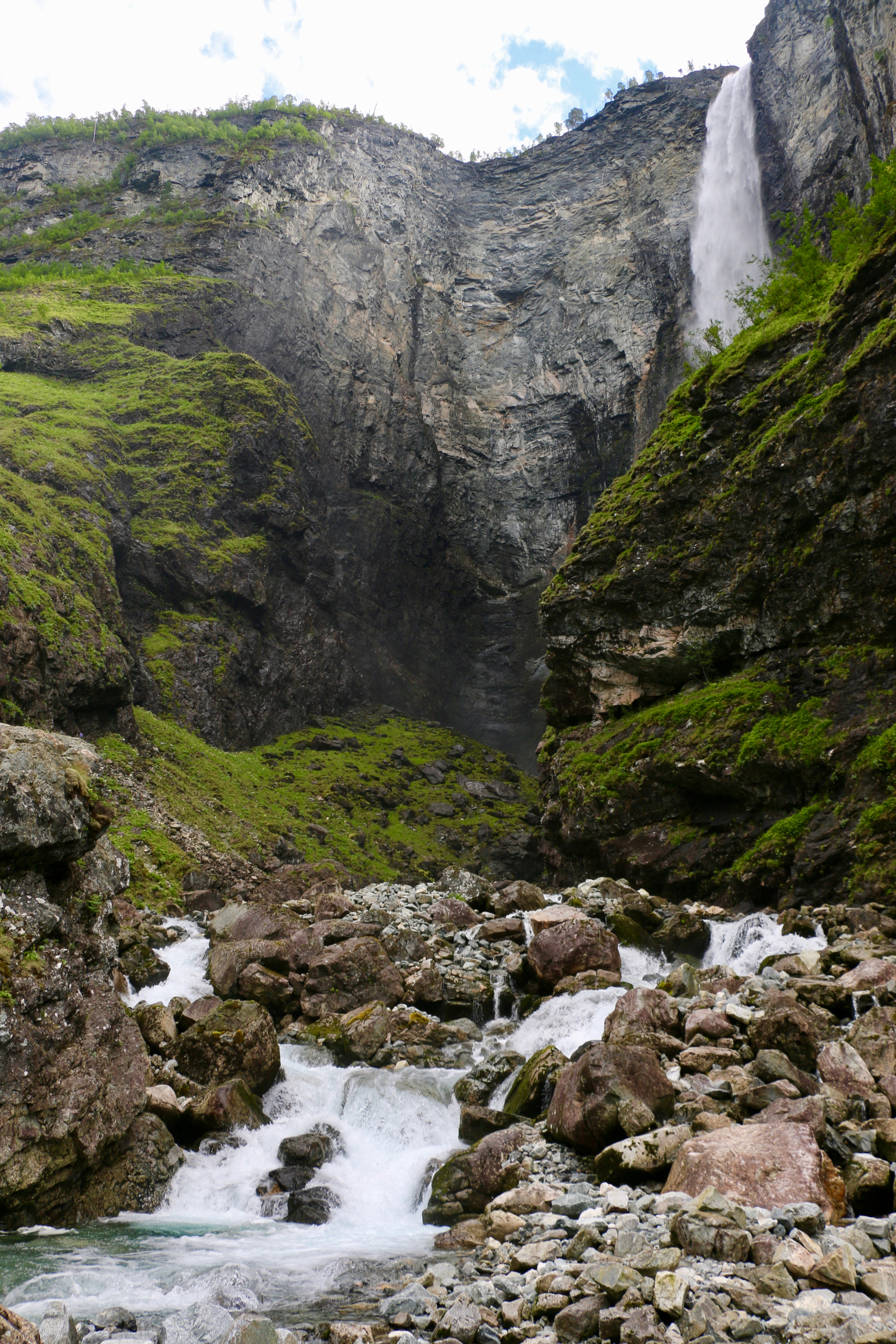

== See also ==
- List of waterfalls#Norway
- Fosselvi, the river that begins at Vettisfossen and flows towards the river Utla
