= Vettismorki =

- Mountain farm
- Interactive map of Vettismorki
- Location within Vestland Location within Norway
- Coordinates: 61.38314°N 7.96277°E
- Country: Norway
- Region: Western Norway
- County: Vestland
- District: Sogn
- Municipality: Årdal Municipality
- Elevation: 682 m (2,238 ft)
- Time zone: UTC+01:00 (CET)
  - Summer (DST): UTC+02:00 (CEST)

Vettismorki is an old mountain farm located just above the waterfall Vettisfossen in the Utladalen valley in Årdal Municipality in Vestland county, Norway. It is 2 kilometres (1.2 mi) north of the Vetti farm, and 12 kilometres (7.5 mi) northeast of the village of Øvre Årdal. Today, Vettismorki is a popular rest stop when walking along the trails in the Utladalen Landscape Protection Area and in Jotunheimen National Park. The cabin Ingjerdbu is owned and run by the Vetti family and is accessible for members of the Norwegian Trekking Association.
