= Vetti, Norway =

Vetti
- Historic Farm
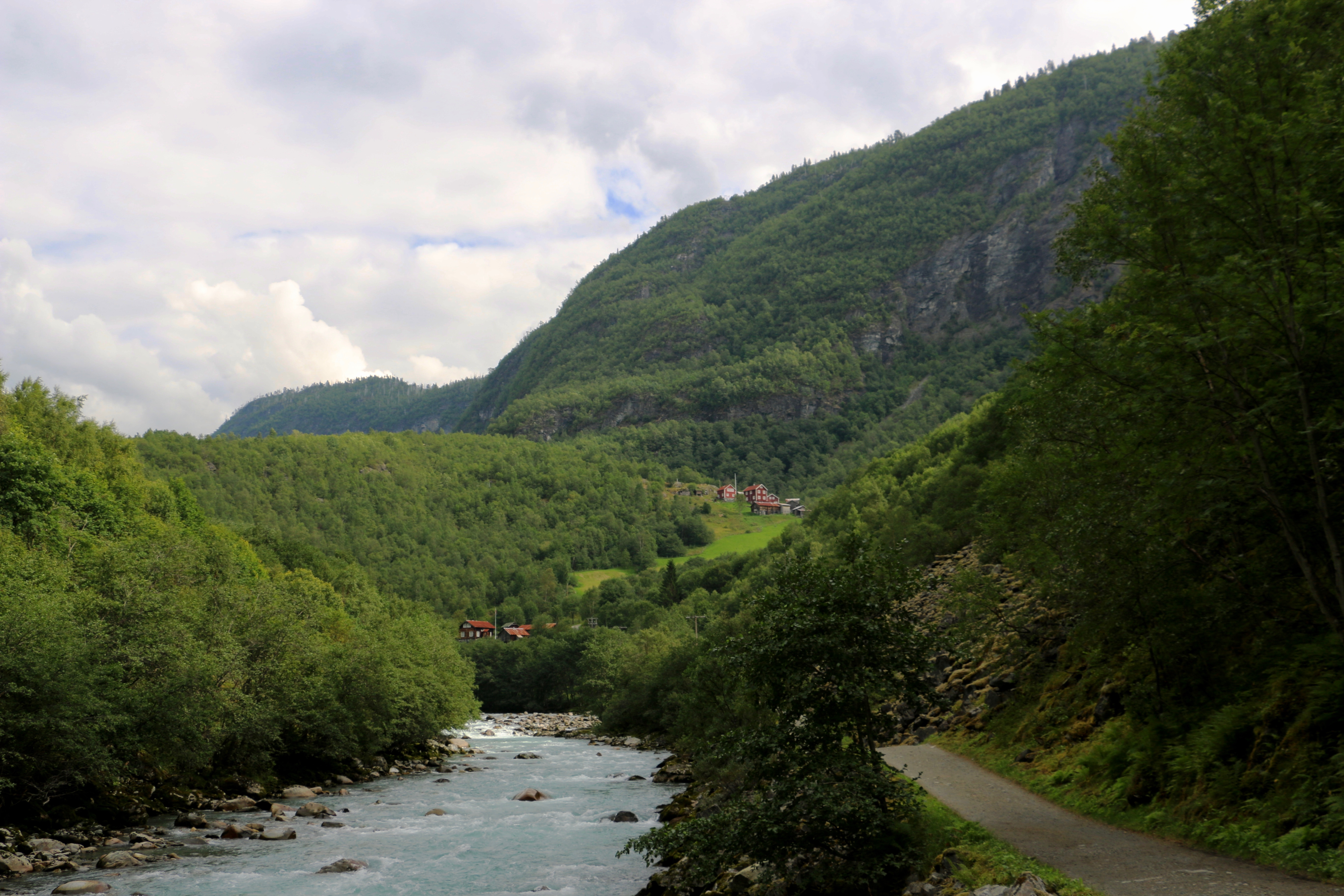
- Vetti gard, on the right.
- Interactive map of Vetti
- Location within Vestland Location within Norway
- Coordinates: 61.37516°N 7.9256°E
- Country: Norway
- Region: Western Norway
- County: Vestland
- District: Sogn
- Municipality: Årdal Municipality
- Elevation: 314 m (1,030 ft)
- Time zone: UTC+01:00 (CET)
  - Summer (DST): UTC+02:00 (CEST)

Vetti (or Vetti Gard) is an old farm area in the Utla valley (Utladalen) in Årdal Municipality in Vestland county, Norway. It is located northeast of the village of Øvre Årdal, along the Utla river and has likely been inhabited since 1120. From Vetti, there are two walking paths into the Utladalen Landscape Protection Area and the Jotunheimen National Park. One path goes to the waterfall Vettisfossen and the other one goes to an old mountain farm, Vettismorki, 2 kilometres (1.2 mi) to the north.

Vetti can be reached by foot or by horse-carriage from the nearby Hjelle farm, 4 kilometres (2.5 mi) to the south. Vetti is no longer regularly inhabited, but it is now used as a cafeteria and guesthouse for mountain hikers during summer months.

== History ==
Archaeological evidence of use since 1120. In 1601, historical records show that it was listed as an abandoned farm, but since 1775, it has been owned by the Vetti family. They have accepted tourists as guests since 1820.
