= Utladalen Landscape Protection Area =

Protected area in Vestland county, Norway

- IUCN category V (protected landscape/seascape)
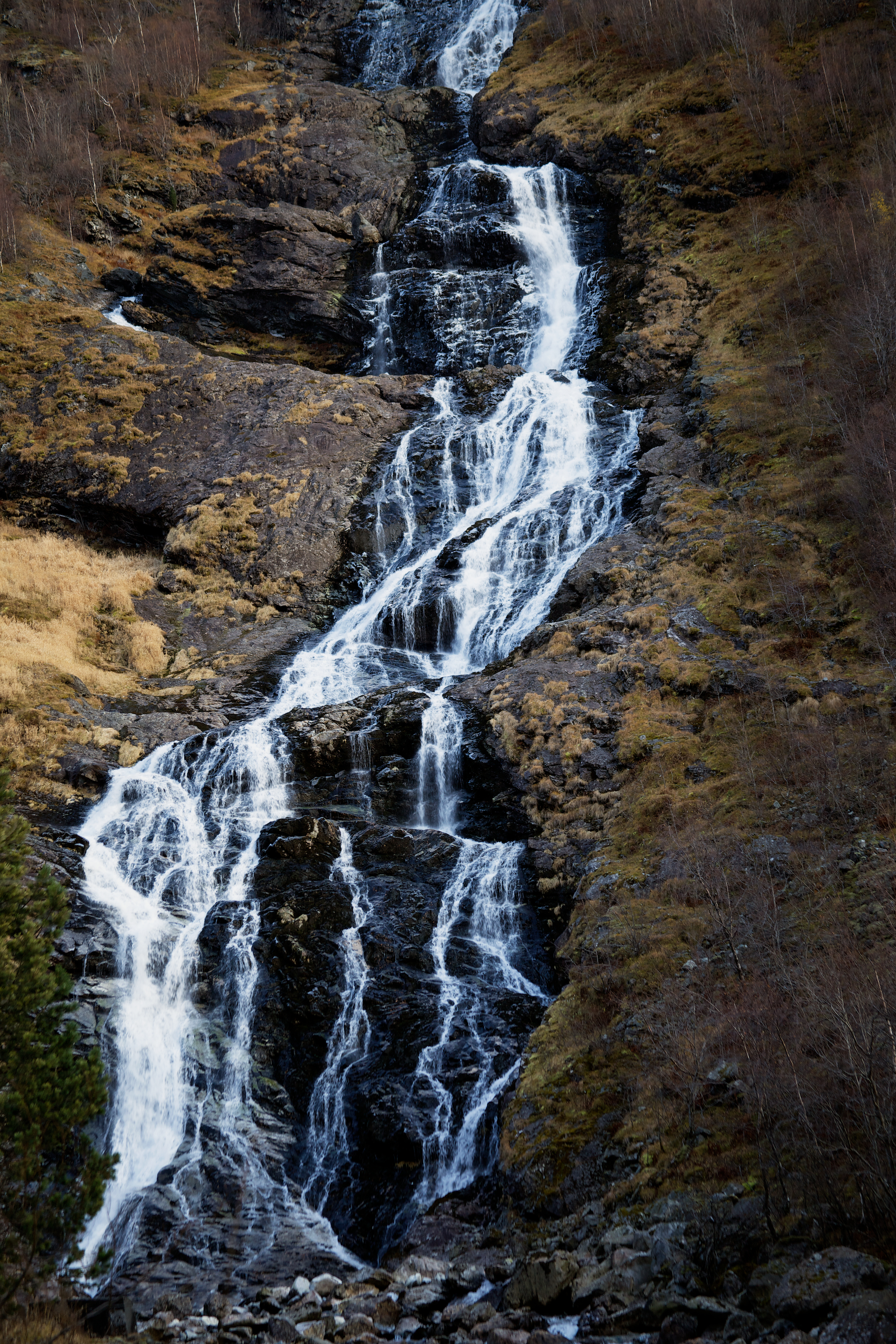
- Hjellefossen waterfall in Utladalen
- Interactive map of Utladalen Landscape Protection Area
- Location: Jotunheimen, Norway
- Nearest city: Øvre Årdal
- Coordinates: 61°24′57″N 08°01′58″E
- Area: 300 km^{2} (120 sq mi)
- Established: December 5, 1980
- Governing body: Norwegian Directorate for Nature Management

Utladalen Landscape Protection Area (Norwegian: Utladalen landskapsvernområde) is adjacent to Jotunheimen National Park, covering Utladalen, Norway's deepest valley. It is located about 5 kilometres (3.1 mi) northeast of Øvre Årdal in Årdal Municipality in Vestland county, Norway.

The landscape protection area was established 1980 and covers about 300 square kilometres (120 sq mi) at an elevation of about 1,000 metres (3,300 ft) above sea level. It includes both the Utladalen and Avdalen valleys as well as areas that extend both westward and northward to Jotunheimen National Park, and eastward to lake Tyin. The waterfall Vettisfossen and the mountain Falketind are both located within the protection area.

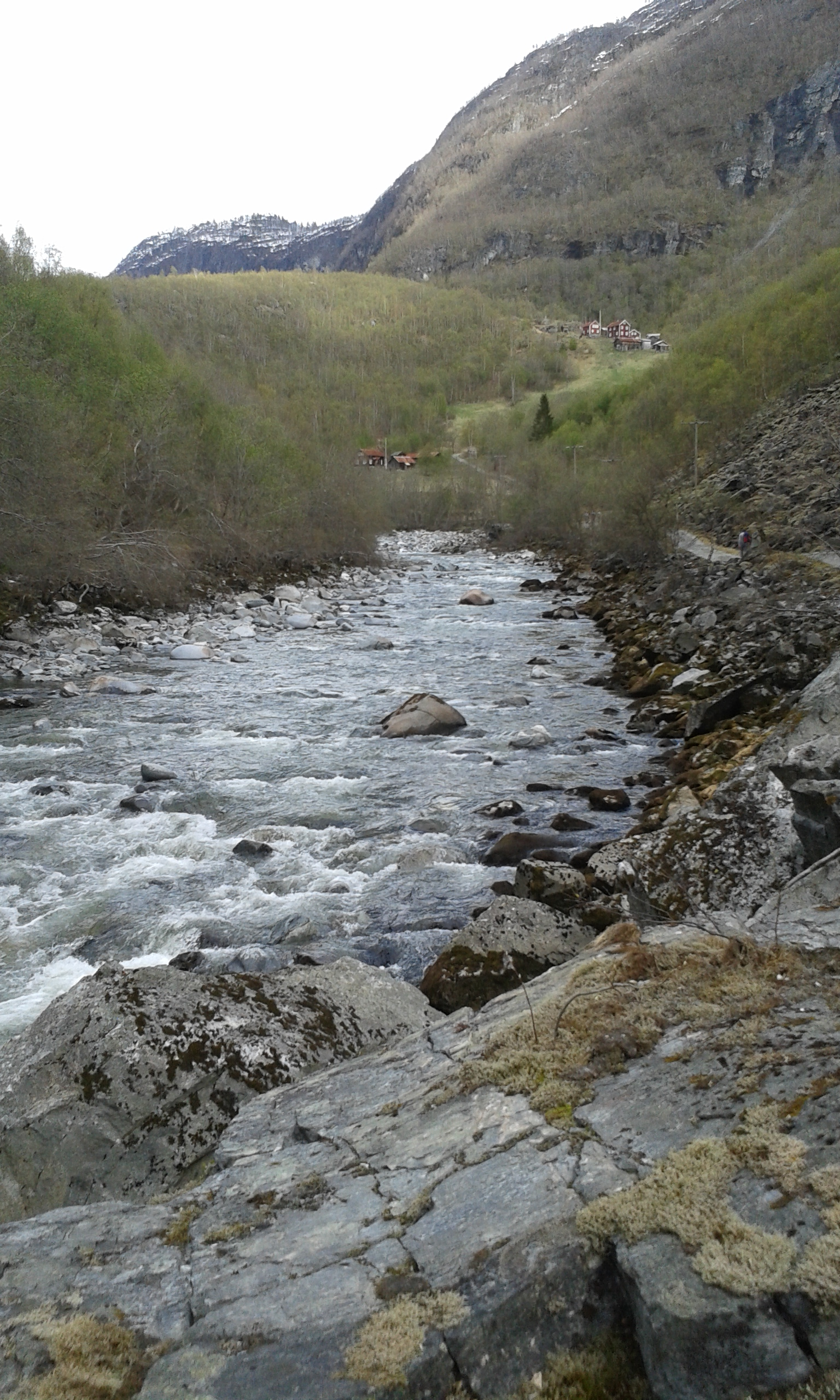
Utla river near Vetti Gard on the way to Vettisfossen
