= Årdal Municipality =

Municipality in Vestland, Norway

Årdal Municipality Årdal kommune
- Municipality
- Aardal herred (historic name)
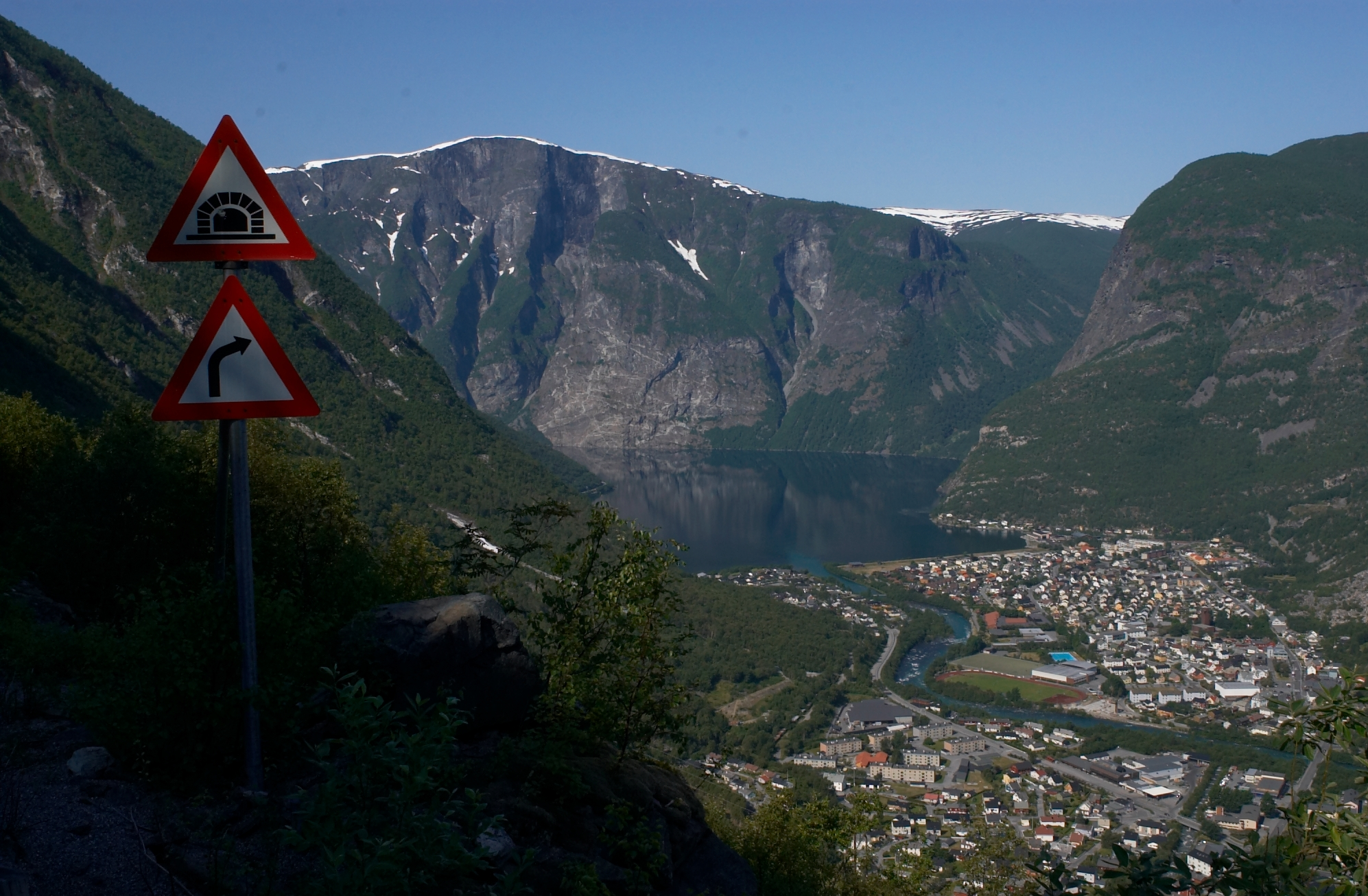
- Øvre Årdal in early-June 2008

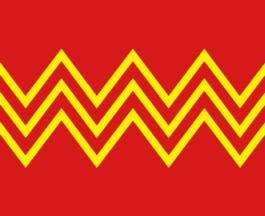
- Flag Coat of arms

- Vestland within Norway

- Årdal within Vestland
- Coordinates: 61°17′29″N 07°47′53″E
- Country: Norway
- County: Vestland
- District: Sogn
- Established: 1863
  - Preceded by: Lærdal Municipality
- Administrative centre: Årdalstangen

Government
  - Mayor (2023): Christian Sønstlien (Ap)

Area
  - Total: 976.58 km^{2} (377.06 sq mi)
  - Land: 930.05 km^{2} (359.09 sq mi)
  - Water: 46.53 km^{2} (17.97 sq mi) 4.8%
  - Rank: #119 in Norway
- Highest elevation: 2,402.12 m (7,881.0 ft)

Population (2025)
  - Total: 5,213
  - Rank: #181 in Norway
  - Density: 5.3/km^{2} (14/sq mi)
  - Change (10 years): ▼ −4.7%
- Demonym: Årdøl

Official language
  - Norwegian form: Nynorsk
- Time zone: UTC+01:00 (CET)
  - Summer (DST): UTC+02:00 (CEST)
- ISO 3166 code: NO-4643
- Website: Official website

Årdal is a municipality in Vestland county, Norway. It is located at the end of the Årdalsfjorden in the traditional district of Sogn. The village of Årdalstangen is the administrative center of the municipality. Other villages in the municipality include Øvre Årdal, Indre Offerdal, and Seimsdalen. Årdal Municipality was established in 1863 when it was separated from Lærdal Municipality.

The 976.58-square-kilometre (377.06 sq mi) municipality is the 119th largest by area out of the 357 municipalities in Norway. Årdal Municipaltiy is the 181st most populous municipality in Norway with a population of 5,213. The municipality's population density is 5.3 inhabitants per square kilometre (14/sq mi) and its population has decreased by 4.7% over the previous 10-year period.

Årdal is a modern industrial community, with ties to the old society of farming and fishing. It is surrounded by dramatic nature with high mountains and waterfalls. The climate is rather mild and with less rain than normal in the west part of Norway. Årdal is a good starting point to explore the wild nature of Jotunheimen National Park, and with summer and winter activities within its boundaries. The Vettisfossen waterfall (highest in Norway) is located within the municipality.

The Valdres Express stops in Øvre Årdal and has its end stop in Årdalstangen. The bus line originates from Oslo.

== General information ==
=== Establishment ===
Lærdal Municipality was established as a municipality on 1 January 1838 (see formannskapsdistrikt law). The original Lærdal Municipality was identical to the Church of Norway's Lærdal prestegjeld which included the parish (sokn) of Aardal. In 1863, the parish of Aardal (population: 1,791) was separated from Lærdal Municipality and became the new Aardal Municipality (the spelling was later changed to Årdal).

During the 1960s, there were many municipal mergers across Norway due to the work of the Schei Committee. On 1 January 1964, the Muggeteigen, Luggenes, and Bergmål farms (population: 11) were transferred from Årdal Municipality to Lærdal Municipality.

Historically, this municipality was part of the old Sogn og Fjordane county. On 1 January 2020, the municipality became a part of the newly-formed Vestland county (after Hordaland and Sogn og Fjordane counties were merged).

=== Name ===
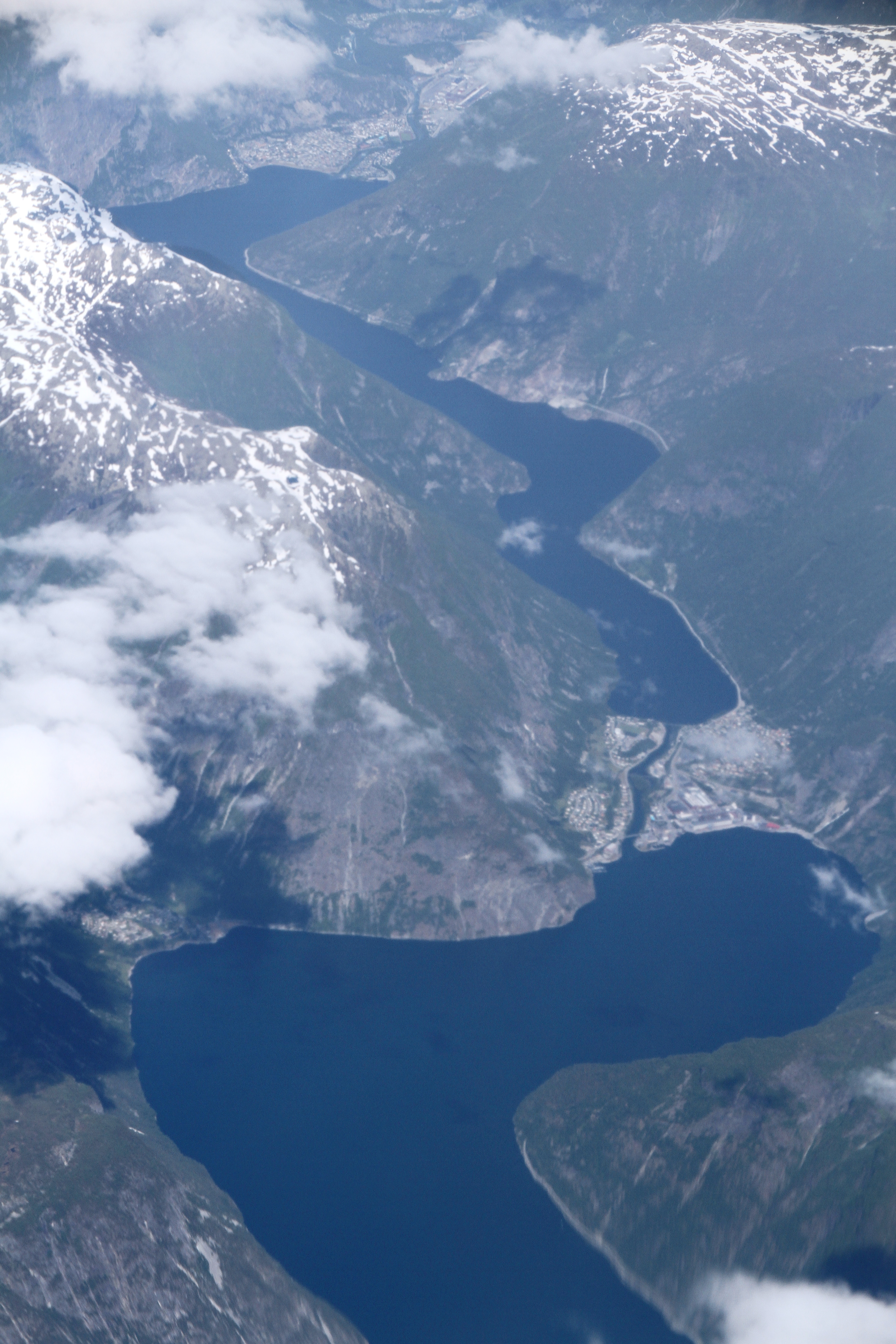
View of Årdalstangen between two lakes

The municipality (originally the parish) is named after the Årdalen valley (Old Norse: Árdalr) since it is the central geographical feature of the municipality. The first element is the genitive case of the word á which means "river" or "creek" (referring to the Utla river). The last element is dalr which means "valley" or "dale".

On 21 December 1917, a royal resolution enacted the 1917 Norwegian language reforms. Prior to this change, the name was spelled Aardal with the digraph "Aa", and after this reform, the name was spelled Årdal, using the letter Å instead.

=== Coat of arms ===
The coat of arms was granted on 9 August 1957. The official blazon is "Gules, three barrulets dancetty Or" (Norwegian: På raud botn ein gull trillingstreng med ormeband-skurd). This means the arms have a red field (background) and the charge is three zig-zag lines running horizontally across the escutcheon. The charge has a tincture of Or which means it is commonly colored yellow, but if it is made out of metal, then gold is used. The local economy at the time of the creation of the arms was mainly based on heavy industry, which needed a lot of electricity. The zig-zag lines in the arms symbolize both the electrical power and the industries. The zig-zag design also symbolizes the ormeband-skrud which is more or less translated as a "worm-ribbon ornament" which is a design of dragons and lindworms that were depicted in the ornamentations in the ancient Norwegian wooden stave churches in the area. The arms were designed by Hallvard Trætteberg, after an original idea by Magnus Hardeland. The municipal flag has the same design as the coat of arms.

=== Churches ===
The Church of Norway has two parishes (sokn) within Årdal Municipality. It is part of the Sogn prosti (deanery) in the Diocese of Bjørgvin.

Churches in Årdal Municipality
Parish (sokn)	Church name	Location of the church	Year built
Nedre Årdal	Årdal Church	Årdalstangen	1867
Øvre Årdal	Farnes Church	Øvre Årdal	1970

== History ==
The group called Årdal Sogelag concerns itself with local history.

In 2016, the chief of police for Vestlandet formally suggested a reconfiguration of police districts and stations. He proposed that the police station in Årdal be closed.

=== Asylum center ===
From 1 August to 1 September 2013, Årdal Municipality received 151 asylum seekers. (Earlier, the municipal council had said no to establishing a center for asylum seekers, but the County Governor of Sogn og Fjordane ordered it anyway.) On 4 November 2013, one of the center's asylum seekers was removed by police and ordered to be deported from Norway. This was the first time an asylum seeker was deported from the Årdal asylum center. Later on the same day, there was a murder on a bus from Årdal to Oslo. One of the residents of the asylum center was found with a knife in his hand on the bus together with one dead bus driver and two dead passengers. The incident is known as the Triple murder on the Valdres Express. The police considered the asylum seeker alone as the suspected murderer.

== Geography ==
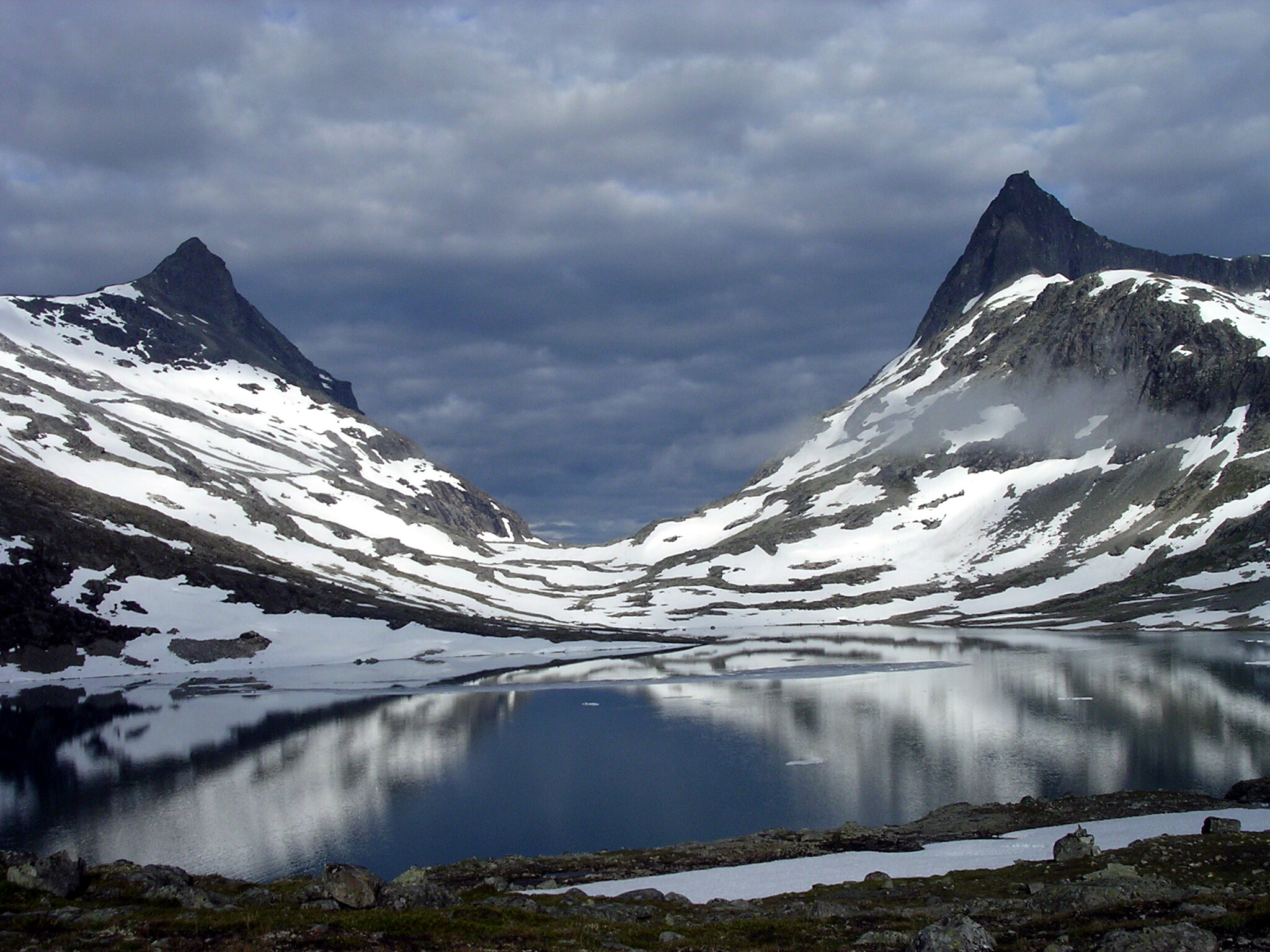
The two mountains on each side of the valley are named Hjelledalstind (left) and Falketind (right)

The municipality is situated at the inner part of the Årdalsfjorden, one of the beginning branches of the Sognefjorden and is a gateway to the mountain areas called Jotunheimen and Hurrungane. The highest point in the municipality is the 2,402.12-metre (7,881.0 ft) tall mountain Storen. The mountains Blåberg, Falketind, Store Austanbottstind, and Hjelledalstinden are also located in the municipality.

There are two main urban areas in Årdal: Årdalstangen and Øvre Årdal. There are also smaller village areas throughout the municipality: Naddvik (Vikadalen), Nundalen, Indre Offerdal, Ytre Offerdal, Seimsdalen, Fardalen, Avdalen, Utladalen, Vetti, and Vettismorki.

Årdal is bordered to the north and west by Luster Municipality, to the east by Vang Municipality (in Innlandet county), and to the south by Lærdal Municipality.

== Government ==
Årdal Municipality is responsible for primary education (through 10th grade), outpatient health services, senior citizen services, welfare and other social services, zoning, economic development, and municipal roads and utilities. The municipality is governed by a municipal council of directly elected representatives. The mayor is indirectly elected by a vote of the municipal council. The municipality is under the jurisdiction of the Sogn og Fjordane District Court and the Gulating Court of Appeal.

=== Municipal council ===
The municipal council (Kommunestyre) of Årdal Municipality is made up of 21 representatives that are elected to four-year terms. The tables below show the current and historical composition of the council by political party.

Årdal kommunestyre 2023–2027
Party name (in Nynorsk)	Number of representatives
Labour Party (Arbeidarpartiet)	15
Conservative Party (Høgre)	6
Total number of members:	21

Årdal kommunestyre 2019–2023
Party name (in Nynorsk)	Number of representatives
Labour Party (Arbeidarpartiet)	11
Conservative Party (Høgre)	1
Red Party (Raudt)	1
Centre Party (Senterpartiet)	8
Total number of members:	21

Årdal kommunestyre 2015–2019
Party name (in Nynorsk)	Number of representatives
Labour Party (Arbeidarpartiet)	10
Green Party (Miljøpartiet Dei Grøne)	1
Conservative Party (Høgre)	1
Centre Party (Senterpartiet)	8
Liberal Party (Venstre)	1
Total number of members:	21

Årdal kommunestyre 2011–2015
Party name (in Nynorsk)	Number of representatives
Labour Party (Arbeidarpartiet)	16
Progress Party (Framstegspartiet)	1
Conservative Party (Høgre)	1
Centre Party (Senterpartiet)	3
Total number of members:	21

Årdal kommunestyre 2007–2011
Party name (in Nynorsk)	Number of representatives
Labour Party (Arbeidarpartiet)	16
Progress Party (Framstegspartiet)	1
Conservative Party (Høgre)	1
Centre Party (Senterpartiet)	2
Socialist Left Party (Sosialistisk Venstreparti)	1
Total number of members:	21

Årdal kommunestyre 2003–2007
Party name (in Nynorsk)	Number of representatives
Labour Party (Arbeidarpartiet)	15
Progress Party (Framstegspartiet)	2
Centre Party (Senterpartiet)	2
Socialist Left Party (Sosialistisk Venstreparti)	2
Total number of members:	21

Årdal kommunestyre 1999–2003
Party name (in Nynorsk)	Number of representatives
Labour Party (Arbeidarpartiet)	21
Joint list of the Centre Party (Senterpartiet), Christian Democratic Party (Kristeleg Folkeparti), and Liberal Party (Venstre)	8
Total number of members:	29

Årdal kommunestyre 1995–1999
Party name (in Nynorsk)	Number of representatives
Labour Party (Arbeidarpartiet)	21
Conservative Party (Høgre)	2
Socialist Left Party (Sosialistisk Venstreparti)	3
Joint list of the Centre Party (Senterpartiet) and the Christian Democratic Party (Kristeleg Folkeparti)	3
Total number of members:	29

Årdal kommunestyre 1991–1995
Party name (in Nynorsk)	Number of representatives
Labour Party (Arbeidarpartiet)	20
Conservative Party (Høgre)	2
Socialist Left Party (Sosialistisk Venstreparti)	4
Joint list of the Centre Party (Senterpartiet) and the Christian Democratic Party (Kristeleg Folkeparti)	3
Total number of members:	29

Årdal kommunestyre 1987–1991
Party name (in Nynorsk)	Number of representatives
Labour Party (Arbeidarpartiet)	22
Conservative Party (Høgre)	3
Socialist Left Party (Sosialistisk Venstreparti)	3
Joint list of the Centre Party (Senterpartiet) and the Christian Democratic Party (Kristeleg Folkeparti)	1
Total number of members:	29

Årdal kommunestyre 1983–1987
Party name (in Nynorsk)	Number of representatives
Labour Party (Arbeidarpartiet)	22
Conservative Party (Høgre)	3
Christian Democratic Party (Kristeleg Folkeparti)	1
Socialist Left Party (Sosialistisk Venstreparti)	1
Joint list of the Liberal People's Party (Liberale Folkepartiet), Centre Party (Senterpartiet), and Liberal Party (Venstre)	2
Total number of members:	29

Årdal kommunestyre 1979–1983
Party name (in Nynorsk)	Number of representatives
Labour Party (Arbeidarpartiet)	21
Conservative Party (Høgre)	3
Christian Democratic Party (Kristeleg Folkeparti)	1
Socialist Left Party (Sosialistisk Venstreparti)	2
Joint list of the New People's Party (Nye Folkepartiet), Centre Party (Senterpartiet), and Liberal Party (Venstre)	2
Total number of members:	29

Årdal kommunestyre 1975–1979
Party name (in Nynorsk)	Number of representatives
Labour Party (Arbeidarpartiet)	21
Conservative Party (Høgre)	1
Socialist Left Party (Sosialistisk Venstreparti)	2
Joint list of the Centre Party (Senterpartiet), Christian Democratic Party (Kristeleg Folkeparti), New People's Party (Nye Folkepartiet), and Liberal Party (Venstre)	5
Total number of members:	29

Årdal kommunestyre 1971–1975
Party name (in Nynorsk)	Number of representatives
Labour Party (Arbeidarpartiet)	22
Conservative Party (Høgre)	2
Christian Democratic Party (Kristeleg Folkeparti)	1
Liberal Party (Venstre)	4
Total number of members:	29

Årdal kommunestyre 1967–1971
Party name (in Nynorsk)	Number of representatives
Labour Party (Arbeidarpartiet)	21
Liberal Party (Venstre)	4
Joint List(s) of Non-Socialist Parties (Borgarlege Felleslister)	2
Local List(s) (Lokale lister)	2
Total number of members:	29

Årdal kommunestyre 1963–1967
Party name (in Nynorsk)	Number of representatives
Labour Party (Arbeidarpartiet)	22
Liberal Party (Venstre)	4
Joint List(s) of Non-Socialist Parties (Borgarlege Felleslister)	3
Total number of members:	29

Årdal heradsstyre 1959–1963
Party name (in Nynorsk)	Number of representatives
Labour Party (Arbeidarpartiet)	15
Joint List(s) of Non-Socialist Parties (Borgarlege Felleslister)	4
Local List(s) (Lokale lister)	2
Total number of members:	21

Årdal heradsstyre 1955–1959
Party name (in Nynorsk)	Number of representatives
Labour Party (Arbeidarpartiet)	9
Joint List(s) of Non-Socialist Parties (Borgarlege Felleslister)	5
Local List(s) (Lokale lister)	7
Total number of members:	21

Årdal heradsstyre 1951–1955
Party name (in Nynorsk)	Number of representatives
Labour Party (Arbeidarpartiet)	15
Communist Party (Kommunistiske Parti)	1
Joint List(s) of Non-Socialist Parties (Borgarlege Felleslister)	4
Total number of members:	20

Årdal heradsstyre 1947–1951
Party name (in Nynorsk)	Number of representatives
Labour Party (Arbeidarpartiet)	11
Communist Party (Kommunistiske Parti)	1
Joint List(s) of Non-Socialist Parties (Borgarlege Felleslister)	4
Total number of members:	16

Årdal heradsstyre 1945–1947
Party name (in Nynorsk)	Number of representatives
Labour Party (Arbeidarpartiet)	11
Joint List(s) of Non-Socialist Parties (Borgarlege Felleslister)	3
Local List(s) (Lokale lister)	2
Total number of members:	16

Årdal heradsstyre 1937–1941*
Party name (in Nynorsk)	Number of representatives
Labour Party (Arbeidarpartiet)	10
Joint List(s) of Non-Socialist Parties (Borgarlege Felleslister)	6
Total number of members:	16
Note: Due to the German occupation of Norway during World War II, no elections were held for new municipal councils until after the war ended in 1945.

=== Mayors ===
The mayor (Nynorsk: ordførar) of Årdal Municipality is the political leader of the municipality and the chairperson of the municipal council. Here is a list of people who have held this position:

- 1863–1863: Endre Offerdal
- 1864–1865: Erik Offerdal
- 1866–1869: Rev. Jørgen Julius Schydtz
- 1870–1881: Endre Offerdal
- 1882–1886: Rev. Lars Christian Østvold
- 1887–1887: Wollert Hille
- 1888–1891: Thomas Holsæter
- 1892–1895: Endre Offerdal
- 1896–1898: Erik Nundal
- 1899–1904: Olav Bjørkum
- 1905–1907: Ivar Offerdal
- 1908–1919: Per Klingenberg Hestetun
- 1920–1922: Ivar Offerdal
- 1923–1926: Per Klingenberg Hestetun
- 1926–1940: Jørgen O. Hæreid
- 1941–1941: Per Bjørkum
- 1941–1944: Tomas Lægreid
- 1945–1945: Gunnar Hansen
- 1946–1955: Ivar Sterri
- 1956–1971: Asbjørn Søfting
- 1972–1974: Jakob Flæte
- 1974–1983: Jørgen O. Vee
- 1984–1995: Jo Ragnar Sønstlien (Ap)
- 1995–2002: Oddbjørn Einan (Ap)
- 2002–2019: Arild Ingar Lægreid (Ap)
- 2019–2023: Hilmar Høl (Ap)
- 2023–present: Christian Sønstlien (Ap)

== Industry ==
Årdal Municipality became a symbol of modern Norway after World War II. In the course of a few years, Årdal Municipality was transformed from a scarcely populated rural community into a more urban area situated around the aluminium plant Årdal og Sunndal Verk. Construction of the aluminium plant at Årdal started in 1941. The purpose was to build a large aluminium industry as a part of the German war effort. The Norwegian State confiscated the unfinished plant in Årdal in 1945 at the end of the war. The plant was finished by the government and production started in 1948.

The aluminium factory produced semi-finished aluminium that went on to be transformed into various products in other factories. During the early years most of the aluminium was exported. The car and airplane industries were big aluminium consumers. Some finished products were made in Norway, such as Høyang kitchen equipment, kettles, and pans.

In 1986, Årdal og Sunndal Verk was merged with Norsk Hydro under the name Hydro Aluminium AS.

== Attractions ==
=== Utladalen ===
The Vettisfossen waterfall was given protected status in 1924. With a free fall of 275 metres (902 ft), it is the highest waterfall in Northern Europe.

The Vetti Gard og Turiststasjon, a farm rich in tradition dating from around 1120, is set in dramatic natural surroundings. The farm has been involved in tourism ever since the early 19th century and now serves as a café and tourist information office in the summer. The Vettismorki mountain farm is located nearby.

The Utladalen Landscape Protection Area (314 square kilometres or 121 square miles) was established in conjunction with the Jotunheimen National Park. It comprises large parts of the Utladalen valley and adjoining side valleys. The area contains several old farms and mountain pasture farmsteads of historical interest.

Utladalen Naturhus is a nature center situated at Skåri, an old farm. Farming here ceased in the early 1970s. In 1996 work commenced on the restoration of the old cultural landscape, and the Utladalen Naturhus center was opened in May 1998. Run by the Utladalen Naturhus foundation, the aim of the centre is to inform visitors about the natural and cultural history of Utladalen and Western Jotunheimen. The centre also includes the Slingsby Museum.

=== Avdalen Gård (Farm) ===
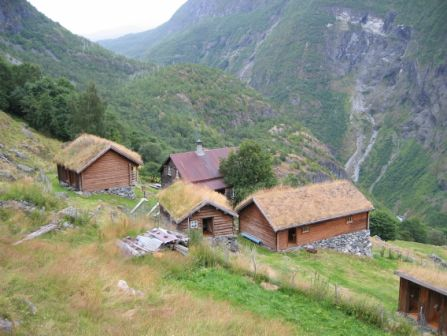
The Avdalen Farm (Avdalen Gård)

The Avdalen farm is scenically situated on the mountainside above the beautiful Avdalen waterfall in the Utladalen valley. The land was cleared for farming in the 16th century. Abandoned in more recent times, the farm has now been restored to provide restaurant, accommodation and meeting facilities. The mill house can be seen in operation milling grain.

=== Jotunheimen National Park ===
The Jotunheimen National Park, established in 1980, covers an area of approximately 1,145 square kilometres (442 sq mi) and comprises the Hurrungane, Fannaråki, and the Rauddalstind og Mjølkedalstind peaks. Jotunheimen is a popular area for hiking in summer and skiing in winter, and the Hurrungane massif is very popular with climbers.

=== Indre Offerdal Museum ===
This old fjord-side settlement of Indre Offerdal "right down by the shore" is packed with history about Årdal. From the times of 19th century, ten buildings, including a mill, sawmill, a shoreside warehouse, and farm buildings provide insights into the beginnings of the extensive industrialization of this local community.

=== Scenic Views ===
- Mountain Road from Årdal-Turtagrø: In the summer, this road from Øvre Årdal to Turtagrø links Årdal to the Sognefjell mountain road.
- Folkevegen road from Hjelle-Vetti: From Vetti you can walk to Europe's highest waterfall (275 metres or 902 feet high). The road/path passes four waterfalls.

== Notable people ==
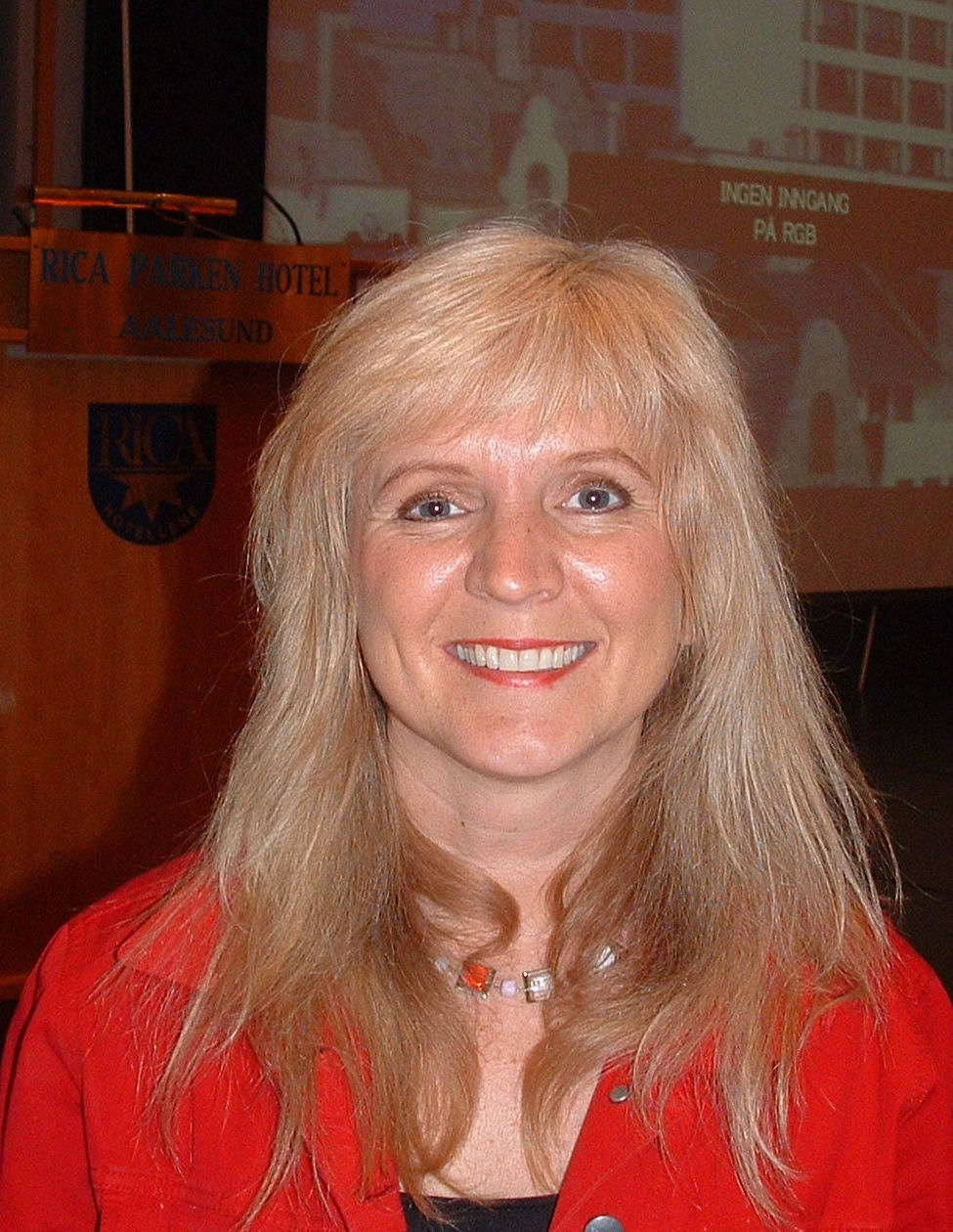
Gunvor Eldegard, 2008

- James O. Davidson (1854 in Årdal – 1922), an American politician who was the 21st Governor of Wisconsin
- Sigurd Eldegard (1866 in Årdal – 1950), an actor, playwright and theatre director
- Andreas Bjørkum (1932 in Årdal – 2014), a philologist who specialized in dialectology
- Karl Seglem (born 1961 in Årdalstangen), a jazz musician, composer, and producer
- Gunvor Eldegard (born 1963 in Årdal), a Norwegian politician and mayor of Årdal from 2003-2005
- Odd Einar Nordheim (born 1972 in Årdal), a singer and musician known from The Voice and Stjernekamp
- Beate S. Lech (born 1974), a jazz singer, composer, and lyricist who was brought up in Øvre Årdal
- Tommy Øren (born 1980 in Årdalstangen), a retired footballer with over 240 club caps
