= Tyin =

Lake in Innlandet, Norway

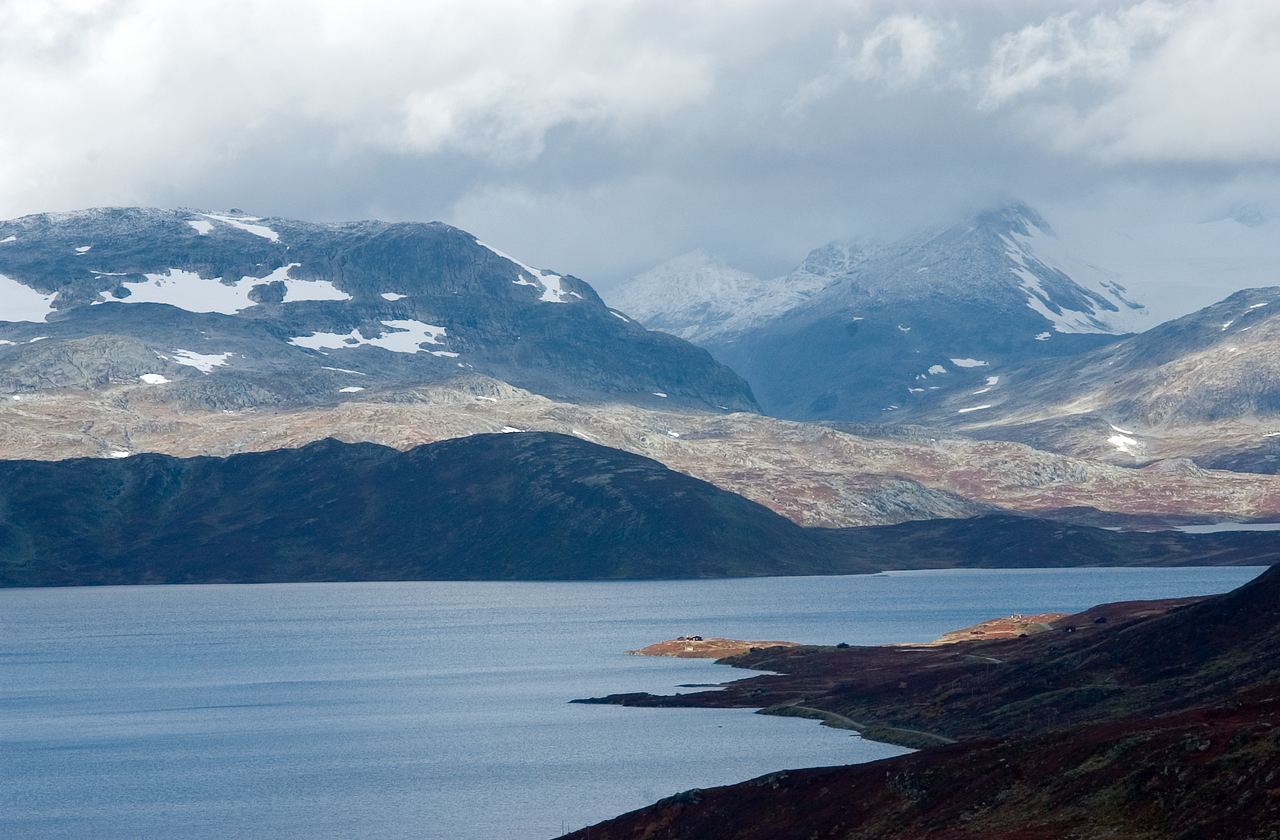
- View of the lake
- Interactive map of the lake
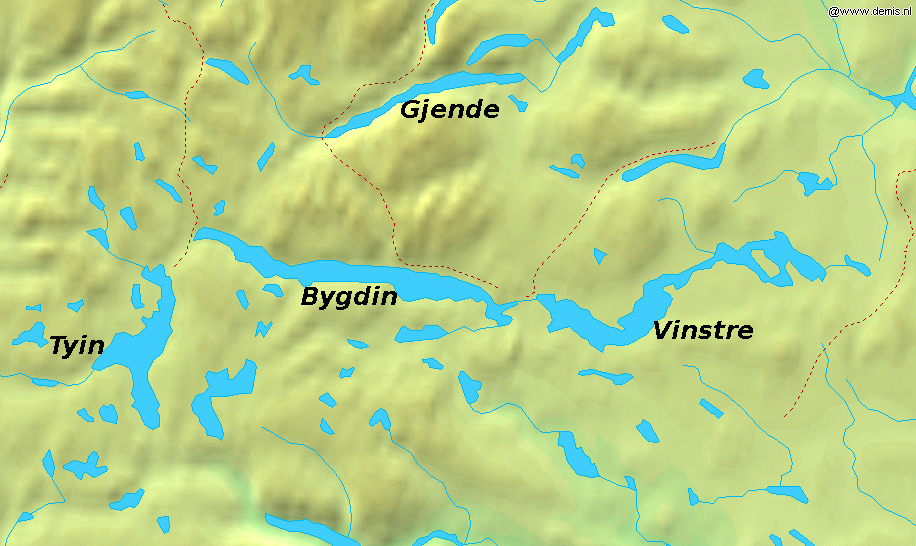
- Tyin is the irregular lake in the left of this figure.
- Location: Innlandet and Vestland
- Coordinates: 61°17′N 8°13′E
- Type: glacier lake
- Primary inflows: Breikvamsåi, Koldedøla and Våga
- Primary outflows: Tya
- Catchment area: 184 km^{2} (71 sq mi)
- Basin countries: Norway
- Max. length: 14 km (8.7 mi)
- Max. width: 5 km (3.1 mi)
- Surface area: 33.21 km^{2} (12.82 sq mi)
- Average depth: 25 m (82 ft)
- Max. depth: 81 m (266 ft)
- Water volume: 0.83 km^{3} (0.20 cu mi)
- Surface elevation: 1,072.5–1,082.8 m (3,519–3,552 ft)
- References: NVE

Tyin is a lake in Vang Municipality in Innlandet county, Norway. The lake is located in the southwest part of the Jotunheimen mountain range. The lake lies in Vang Municipality in Innlandet county, but a small portion of the lake extends into Årdal Municipality in Vestland county. The western border mostly follows the border between Vang and Årdal, but there are some areas where the lake crosses over the boundary. The 33.2-square-kilometre (12.8 sq mi) lake serves as a reservoir for the Tyin Hydroelectric Power Station and the water level is regulated between 1,082.8 to 1,072.50 metres (3,552.5 to 3,518.7 ft) above sea level. The lake has a reservoir capacity of 0.313 cubic kilometres (254,000 acre⋅ft).

The Norwegian County Road 53 runs along the south side of the lake (Tyin–Årdal) and the Norwegian County Road 252 runs along the east side of the lake (Tyin–Eidsbugarden) and both roads connect to the European route E16 highway to the south.

In 1869, the Norwegian Mountain Touring Association (DNT) built its first cabin, which was located on the shores of Tyin. Today, the DNT's tourist cabins make this area, just to the south of Jotunheim National Park, one of the best developed touring areas in Europe. There are also a restricted number of private cabins by the lake.

== Name ==
The name of the lake is derived from the name of the river Tya, the river that connects the lake to Årdalsvatnet and the Sognefjord. The meaning of the river name is unknown.

== Media gallery ==
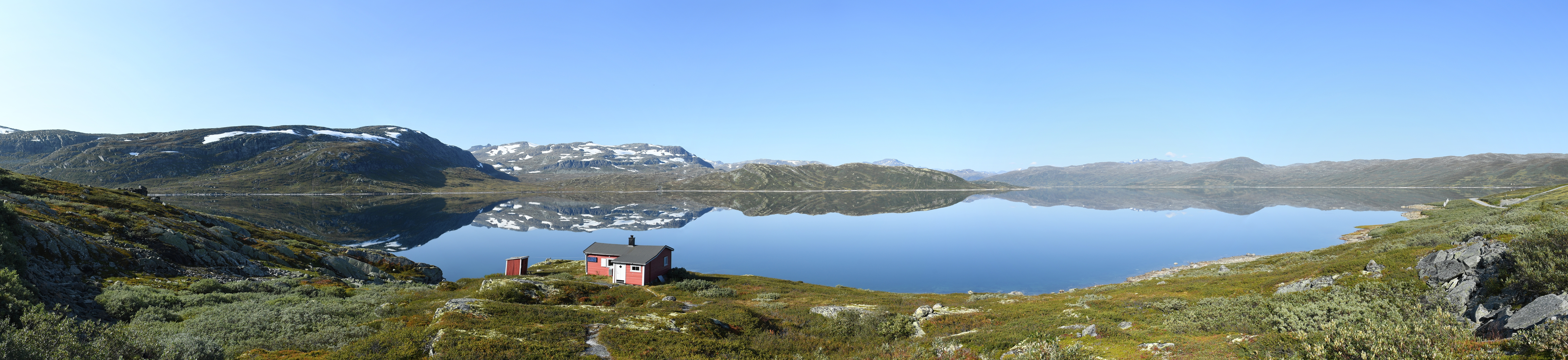
Panorama of the Tyin from the southern shore of the western part of the lake

== See also ==
- Tyin Hydroelectric Power Station
- List of lakes in Norway
