= Skardstinden =

Mountain in Innlandet, Norway

- Skarstind (unofficial)
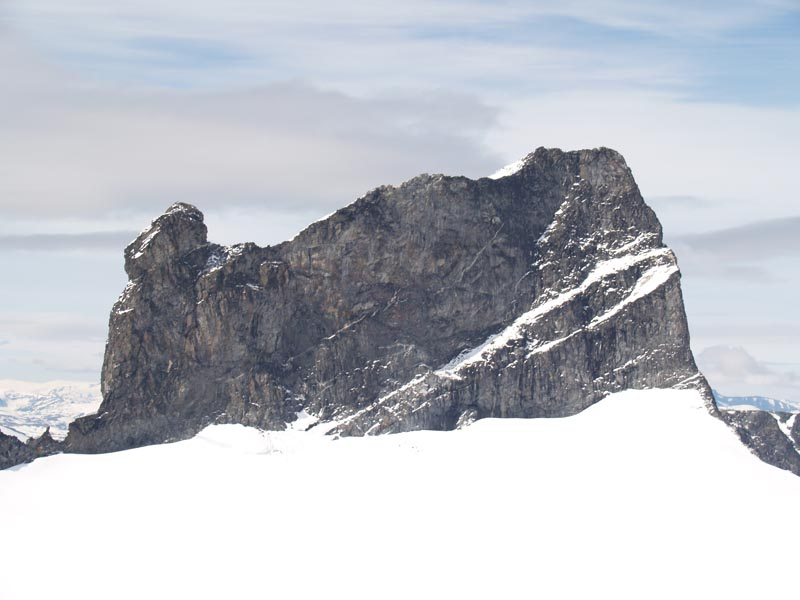
- Eastern wall of Skarstind (August 2005)

Highest point
- Elevation: 2,373 m (7,785 ft)
- Prominence: 276 m (906 ft)
- Parent peak: Galdhøpiggen
- Isolation: 2.3 km (1.4 mi)
- Listing: 1. 5 in Norway
- Coordinates: 61°38′01″N 8°15′56″E

Geography
- Interactive map of the mountain
- Location: Innlandet, Norway
- Parent range: Jotunheimen
- Topo map: 1518 II Galdhøpiggen

Climbing
- First ascent: 1884 (Severin Wleugel, Sig. Thor, Oskar Kristiansen)
- Easiest route: Hiking

Skardstinden is a prominent part of the Galdhøpiggen mountain range in northwestern Jotunheimen, Norway, and is the sixth highest summit in the country. The mountain has three summits, the main summit at 2,373 metres (7,785 ft) above sea level, Nåle (the Needle) at 2,310 metres (7,580 ft) and the small western summit at 2,215 metres (7,267 ft). It is located within the municipality of Lom Municipality in Innlandet county. The mountain is located on the eastern side of the Leirdalen valley, and the summit can be seen from the road along the valley floor. There are several other peaks in the vicinity, but only Galdhøpiggen, a few kilometers to the east, is higher. The mountain can be seen from most of the higher peaks in Jotunheimen and Breheimen to the northwest.

The summit was reached for the first time in 1884 by Severin Wleugel, Sig. Thor, Oskar Kristiansen. The first ascent of the two lower summits remains unknown, but it is probable that they were climbed at the same time.

== Location ==
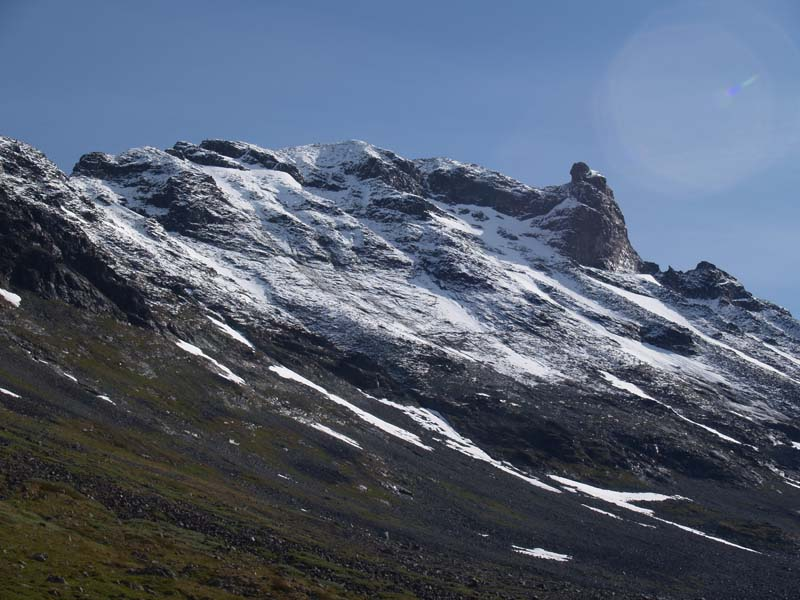
The southwest face of Skarstind with fresh snow in August

The mountain sits about 25 kilometres (16 mi) southwest of the village of Fossbergom and about 45 kilometres (28 mi) northeast of the village of Øvre Årdal. The mountain is surrounded by several other notable mountains including Storgrovtinden and Storgrovhøe to the north; Veslpiggen to the northeast; Galdhøpiggen, Keilhaus topp, and Storjuvtinden to the east; Store Tverråtinden and Svellnosbreahesten to the southeast; Bukkehøe and Lindbergtinden to the south; and Loftet to the west.

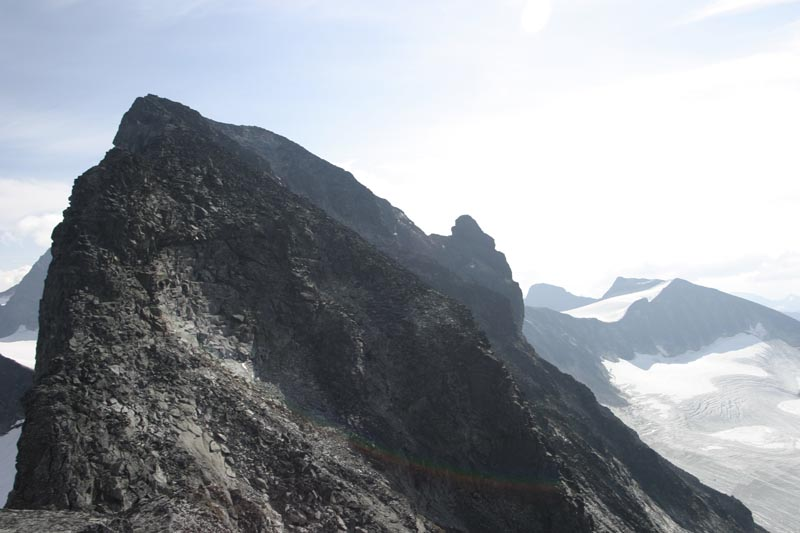
Skarstind seen from the western summit.

The views, except towards the east, where Galdhøpiggen blocks the view, are among the best in Jotunheimen. To the west, you see the Smørstabbtindan range, the Hurrungane range and the Jostedalsbreen glacier. To the northwest you see the Hestbrepiggane range and to the south you see most of the summits in central Jotunheimen.

The shape of the mountain is extremely characteristic. Only from northwest does it look like a 'tind' a high pointy summit in Norwegian. From the east, from Galdhøpiggen, it shows its steep wall with Nåle balancing on the left flank, as seen in the table. This wall is one of the more inaccessible in Jotunheimen and is climbed rarely. The southwest face is less forbidding, and it is possible to find a way up through the partly snow-covered talus slopes. The mountain, as its neighbors, consists of the hard gabbro rock, which withstands erosion better than most other rocks. The orientation of the layers of gabbro in Skarstind is uncommon. Normally they rise from northwest towards southeast, which is why many summits are easiest to reach from the north side. At Skarstind the layers rise from southwest towards northeast. This is easily seen on the photo in the table.

== Access ==
The summit can be reached without equipment if the conditions are good and there is very little snow on the talus slopes on the southwest face. The normal ascent starts from Leirdalen up to Dummhøe, which is an easy, but rather steep climb of more than 1,000 metres (3,300 ft). Up to approximately 1,500 metres (4,900 ft), there is a path, made by sheep and goats, and used by mountaineers, but from there one has to follow the ridge up to Dummhøe, which is more of a small plain than a mountain. The plain is followed up to the summit of Western Skarstind, but from that small summit you can see the difficult west wall of the main summit.

There are four small walls to climb, but they may all be outflanked on the right side if the conditions are good. From the Western summit the flank seems nearly as forbidding as the wall itself, but at a close distance it is not too difficult and no equipment should be necessary. However, on poor conditions, the Talus may be very loose and great caution is advised. On days with fresh snow, like the last picture, equipment will probably be necessary on all routes.

Nåle seems to be very difficult, but it is much easier than the summit itself.

Skarstind is quite popular, given the mountain's high rank among Norwegian peaks; on most days during the short summer season peakbaggers climb the mountain, but the summit is hardly ever crowded. A winter ascent is only for the very experienced.

== Name ==
The first element is the genitive of skard which means 'gap' or 'pass'. The last element is the finite form of tind which means 'mountain peak'. Hence the name means mountain pass peak, but it is impossible to say which pass has given its name to the mountain. It might be the pass to the south or it might be the pass between the summit itself and the pinnacle, Nåle. Nåle, which means 'the Needle', got its name from the local word for pinnacle, which describes the shape of it.
