= Storgrovhøe =

Mountain in Innlandet, Norway

- Bakarste Storgrovhøe; Fremste Storgrovhøe
- Interactive map of the mountain

Highest point
- Elevation: 2,259 m (7,411 ft)
- Prominence: 183 m (600 ft)
- Parent peak: Galdhøpiggen
- Isolation: 1.1 km (0.68 mi)
- Coordinates: 61°39′01″N 8°16′39″E

Geography
- Location: Innlandet, Norway
- Parent range: Jotunheimen
- Topo map: 1518 II Galdhøpiggen

Storgrovhøe is a mountain in Lom Municipality in Innlandet county, Norway. The 2,259-metre (7,411 ft) tall mountain is located in the Jotunheimen mountains within Jotunheimen National Park. The mountain sits about 25 kilometres (16 mi) southwest of the village of Fossbergom and about 45 kilometres (28 mi) northeast of the village of Øvre Årdal. The mountain is surrounded by several other notable mountains including Galdhøe and Juvvasshøe to the northeast; Veslpiggen, Galdhøpiggen, Keilhaus topp, and Storjuvtinden to the southeast; Storgrovtinden and Skardstinden to the south; and Loftet to the southwest.

Storgrovhøe consists of two peaks:

- Bakarste Storgrovhøe, which reaches an elevation of 2,259 metres (7,411 ft) and a topographic prominence of 183 metres (600 ft). It is the 31st tallest mountain in Norway (with a prominence of at least 50 meters).
- Fremste Storgrovhøe, which reaches an elevation of 2,253 metres (7,392 ft) and a topographic prominence of 63 metres (207 ft). It is the 35th tallest mountain in Norway (with a prominence of at least 50 meters).

== See also ==
- List of mountains of Norway by height
