= Steinar Sulheim =

- Born: 1815
- Died: 1856 (aged 40–41)
- Occupations: farmer and mountain tourism pioneer
- Known for: first recorded ascent of Galdhøpiggen in 1850

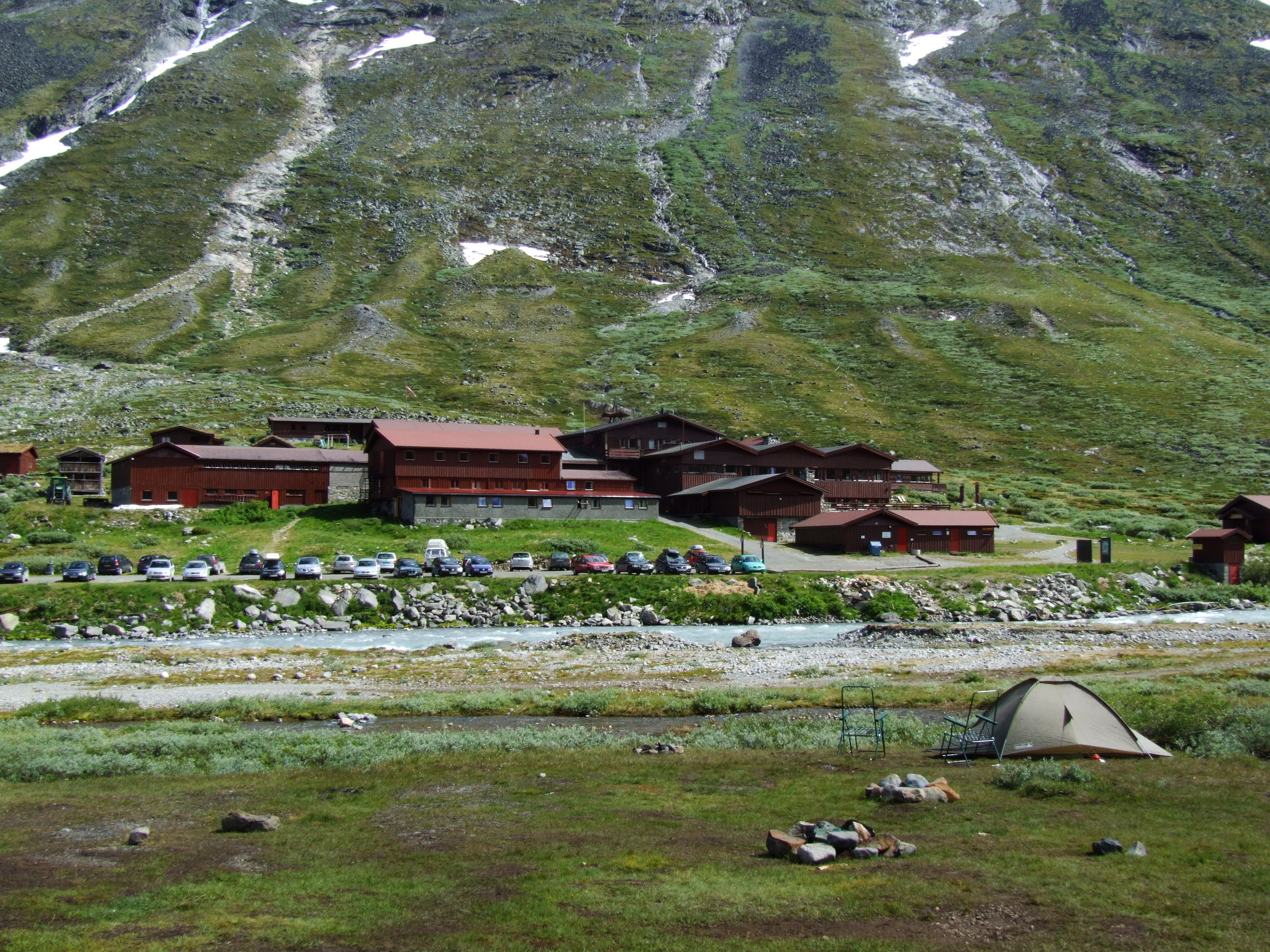
Spiterstulen.

Steinar Sulheim (1815–1856) was a Norwegian farmer and mountain tourism pioneer. He is known for the first recorded ascent of Galdhøpiggen in 1850, along with Ingebrigt Flotten and Lars Arnesen.

He was also one of the first people in Norway to commercialise mountain hiking and guided tours of the region. Sulheim had a farm in Bøverdalen, called Sulheim. (Thereby his name) He was also the owner of the mountain farm Spiterstulen in Visdalen, where he built an annex for providing lodging for visitors to Jotunheimen.

Sulheim died in 1856, at the age of 41. Around 1860 his widow sold the farm in Bøverdalen and the Spiterstulen mountain farm to Rolv Larsen, who adopted the name Rolv Sulheim, and whose descendants developed Spiterstulen further for tourists.
