= Storjuvtinden =

Mountain in Innlandet, Norway

- Interactive map of the mountain

Highest point
- Elevation: 2,344 m (7,690 ft)
- Prominence: 132 m (433 ft)
- Parent peak: Galdhøpiggen
- Isolation: 0.913 km (0.567 mi)
- Listing: #12 in Norway
- Coordinates: 61°37′49″N 8°17′39″E

Geography
- Location: Innlandet, Norway
- Parent range: Jotunheimen
- Topo map: 1518 II Galdhøpiggen

Storjuvtinden is a mountain in Lom Municipality in Innlandet county, Norway. The 2,344-metre (7,690 ft) tall mountain is located in the Jotunheimen mountains within Jotunheimen National Park. The mountain sits about 25 kilometres (16 mi) southwest of the village of Fossbergom and about 45 kilometres (28 mi) northeast of the village of Øvre Årdal. The peak is on the massif between the valleys Leirdalen and Visdalen. The mountain is surrounded by several other notable mountains including Galdhøpiggen and Keilhaus topp to the northeast; Svellnosbreahesten, Midtre Tverråtinden, and Store Tverråtinden to the southeast; Bukkehøe to the southwest; Skardstinden to the west; Storgrovtinden and Storgrovhøe to the northwest; and Veslpiggen to the north.

The mountain can be accessed from Geitsætri in Leirdalen without a glacier crossing. It is Norway's 12th highest mountain, with respect to a Topographic prominence of at least 50 metres (160 ft).

== Name ==
The first element is the name of the Storjuvet gorge. The last element is the finite form of tind which means 'mountain peak'. The name of the gorge is a compound of stor which means 'big' and juv which means 'gorge' or 'canyon'. The gorge is also the source of the name of the glacier Storjuvbrean in the bottom of the gorge.

== See also ==
- List of mountains of Norway by height
