= Sommerfeldtbukta =

Bay in Svalbard, Norway

Coordinates: 76.5773°N 16.4558°E

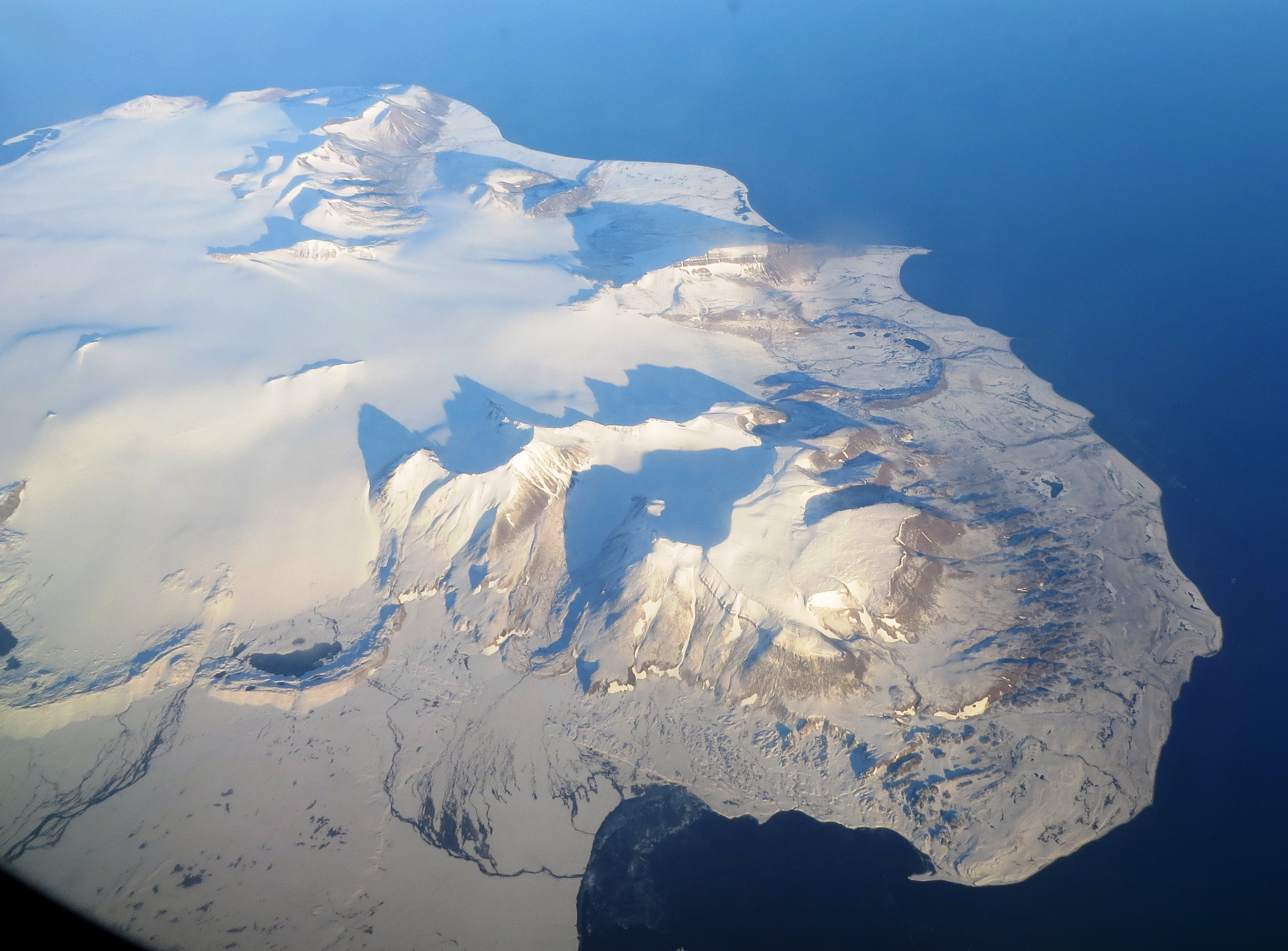
Aerial photo of Sørkapp Land, showing the bay of Sommerfeldtbukta in the lower mid part of the photo, with the nearby mountain of Kistefjellet.

Sommerfeldtbukta is a bay in Sørkapp Land at Spitsbergen, Svalbard. It has a length of about 8.5 kilometers, is located east of Øyrlandet and Øyrlandsodden, and extends further from Skjerodden via Stjernøya and Skolteneset to Sørneset. The bay is named after Norwegian botanist Søren Christian Sommerfeldt.
