= Øyrlandet =

Peninsula in Svalbard, Norway

Coordinates: 76.6290°N 16.3979°E

Øyrlandet is a coastal plain and peninsula in Sørkapp Land at Spitsbergen, Svalbard. The plain extends from Kistefjellet and St. Nikolausfjellet to the east, Belopol'skijbreen to the northeast, and Olsokbreen, Olsokneset and Stormbukta to the north. At the southeastern side of Øyrlandet is the bay of Sommerfeldtbukta, and the southernmost tip is the headland Øyrlandsodden.
