= Storgrovtinden =

Mountain in Innlandet, Norway

- Interactive map of the mountain

Highest point
- Elevation: 2,229 m (7,313 ft)
- Prominence: 33 m (108 ft)
- Parent peak: Bakarste Storgrovhøe
- Isolation: 0.212 km (0.132 mi)
- Coordinates: 61°38′29″N 8°16′00″E

Geography
- Location: Innlandet, Norway
- Parent range: Jotunheimen
- Topo map: 1518 II Galdhøpiggen

Storgrovtinden is a mountain in Lom Municipality in Innlandet county, Norway. The 2,229-metre (7,313 ft) tall mountain is located in the Jotunheimen mountains within Jotunheimen National Park. The mountain sits about 25 kilometres (16 mi) southwest of the village of Fossbergom and about 45 kilometres (28 mi) northeast of the village of Øvre Årdal. The mountain is surrounded by several other notable mountains including Galdhøe and Storgrovhøe to the northeast; Veslpiggen to the east; Galdhøpiggen, Keilhaus topp, and Storjuvtinden to the southeast; Skardstinden to the south; and Loftet to the southwest.

== See also ==
- List of mountains of Norway by height
