= Juvasshytta =

Mountain tourist attraction in Lom municipality, Norway

Coordinates: 61°40′21″N 008°22′14″E

Juvasshytta is a mountain tourist station with restaurant and accommodation, located in the mountain Juvvasshøe in Lom Municipality in Innlandet county, Norway.

It is located at an elevation of 1,841 metres (6,040 ft), and is accessible by road, the highest road in Northern Europe. There is a public bus connection from Lom. Juvasshytta is used as a base station for walks to the summit of Galdhøpiggen, at 2,469 metres (8,100 ft) elevation, the highest mountain in Northern Europe. The area and the road is usually open from May to September, and closed the rest of the year.

Juvasshytta was originally built in 1884. The road was built in 1936.

About 1 kilometre (0.62 mi) from Juvasshytta, there is the Galdhøpiggen Summer Ski Centre, a small ski resort, which is open all summer. It has a height of 350 metres (1,150 ft) with a top altitude of 2,200 metres (7,200 ft). There is one ski lift and two pistes.

== Climate ==
Climate data for Juvvasshøe 1991-2020 (1894 m / 6214 ft ASL)
Month	Jan	Feb	Mar	Apr	May	Jun	Jul	Aug	Sep	Oct	Nov	Dec	Year
Mean daily maximum °C (°F)	−6.5 (20.3)	−7.6 (18.3)	−6.3 (20.7)	−2.6 (27.3)	0.6 (33.1)	5.4 (41.7)	8.8 (47.8)	7.9 (46.2)	3.6 (38.5)	−1.3 (29.7)	−4.1 (24.6)	−6.9 (19.6)	−0.7 (30.7)
Daily mean °C (°F)	−9.4 (15.1)	−9.8 (14.4)	−9.0 (15.8)	−5.8 (21.6)	−2.3 (27.9)	1.8 (35.2)	5.4 (41.7)	4.3 (39.7)	0.9 (33.6)	−3.6 (25.5)	−6.5 (20.3)	−8.9 (16.0)	−3.6 (25.6)
Mean daily minimum °C (°F)	−12.2 (10.0)	−12.3 (9.9)	−11.7 (10.9)	−8.8 (16.2)	−4.8 (23.4)	−0.9 (30.4)	2.8 (37.0)	1.7 (35.1)	−1.6 (29.1)	−6.0 (21.2)	−8.7 (16.3)	−10.8 (12.6)	−6.1 (21.0)
Source: seklima.met.no
