= Jotunheimen Fjellstue =

Tourist hut in Norway

- Interactive map of the Jotunheimen Fjellstue area

General information
- Location: Leirdalen
- Coordinates: 61.6591582°N 8.1447679°E
- Elevation: 1,000 m (3,300 ft)

Jotunheimen Fjellstue is a tourist hut (hotel) in the Leirdalen valley of Lom Municipality in Vestland county, Norway. It is owned by the Norwegian Trekking Association and it is located just outside Jotunheimen National Park.

The hut is located at an elevation of 1,000 metres (3,300 ft) above sea level in the Jotunheimen mountains. It is located along Norwegian County Road 55, the Sognefjellsvegen, between Galdesanden and Leirvassbu.
