= Vesle Galdhøpiggen =

Mountain in Innlandet, Norway

- Veslpiggen
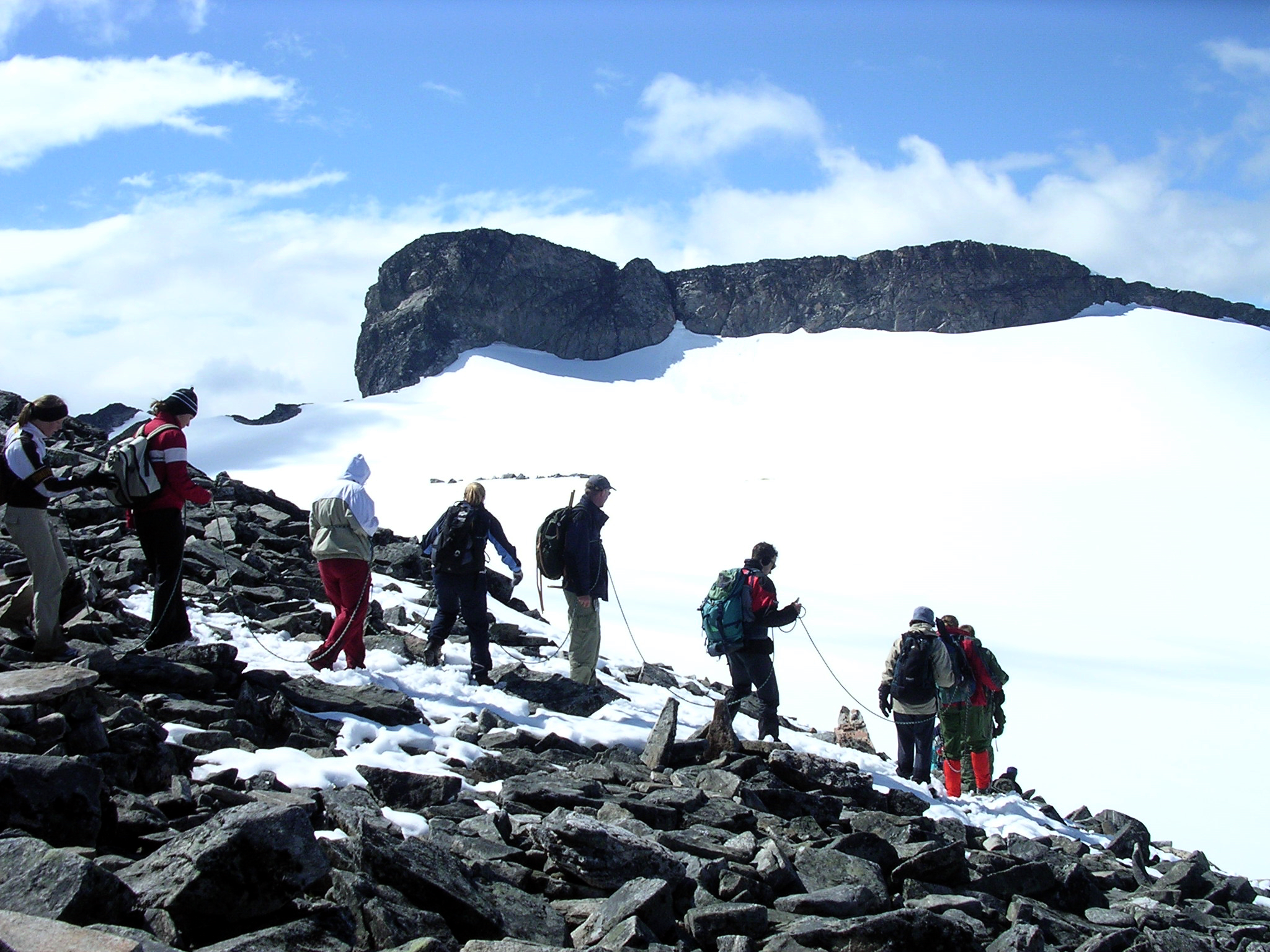

Highest point
- Elevation: 2,369 m (7,772 ft)
- Prominence: 149 m (489 ft)
- Parent peak: Galdhøpiggen
- Isolation: 0.464 km (0.288 mi)
- Listing: #6 in Norway
- Coordinates: 61°38′26″N 8°18′22″E

Geography
- Interactive map of the mountain
- Location: Innlandet, Norway
- Parent range: Jotunheimen
- Topo map: 1518 II Galdhøpiggen

Climbing
- Easiest route: Hiking

Vesle Galdhøpiggen or Veslpiggen is a mountain in Lom Municipality in Innlandet county, Norway. It is the sixth highest mountain in Norway. The 2,369-metre (7,772 ft) tall mountain is located in the Jotunheimen mountains within Jotunheimen National Park. The mountain sits about 25 kilometres (16 mi) southwest of the village of Fossbergom and about 45 kilometres (28 mi) northeast of the village of Øvre Årdal. The mountain is surrounded by several other notable mountains including Galdhøpiggen (Norway's tallest mountain) and Keilhaus topp to the southeast; Storjuvtinden, Svellnosbreahesten, and Store Tverråtinden to the south; Skardstinden to the southwest; Storgrovtinden to the west; and Storgrovhøe to the northwest.

== Name ==
The word vesle means 'small' or 'little' - thus the name means 'the little Galdhøpiggen'.

== See also ==
- List of mountains of Norway by height
