= Sørkapp =

Peninsula in Svalbard, Norway

Coordinates: 76°28.9′N 16°33.8′E

Designations

Ramsar Wetland
- Designated: 12 November 2010
- Reference no.: 1965

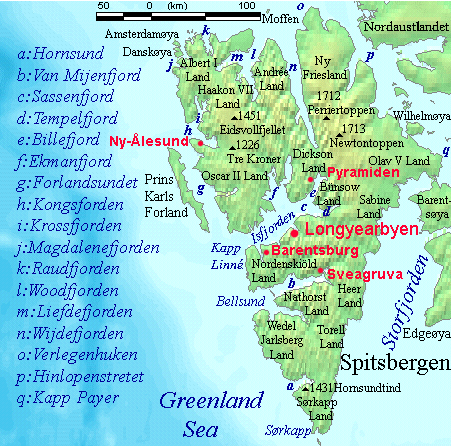
Sørkapp is located on the southern tip of Spitsbergen.

Sørkapp ("South Cape") is the southernmost point on Sørkappøya, 8 kilometres (5.0 mi) south of Spitsbergen, the largest island in the Svalbard archipelago, Arctic Norway. It was originally named Point Lookout (1612). The cape itself is 1 kilometre (0.62 mi) long. The point is bordered by the Greenland Sea to the west, the Norwegian Sea to the south and the Barents Sea to the east. The point is within the Sørkapp Bird Sanctuary.

The distance to mainland Norway at Ingøy is about 640 km and to Bear Island about 230 km.
