= Keilhaus topp =

Mountain in Innlandet, Norway

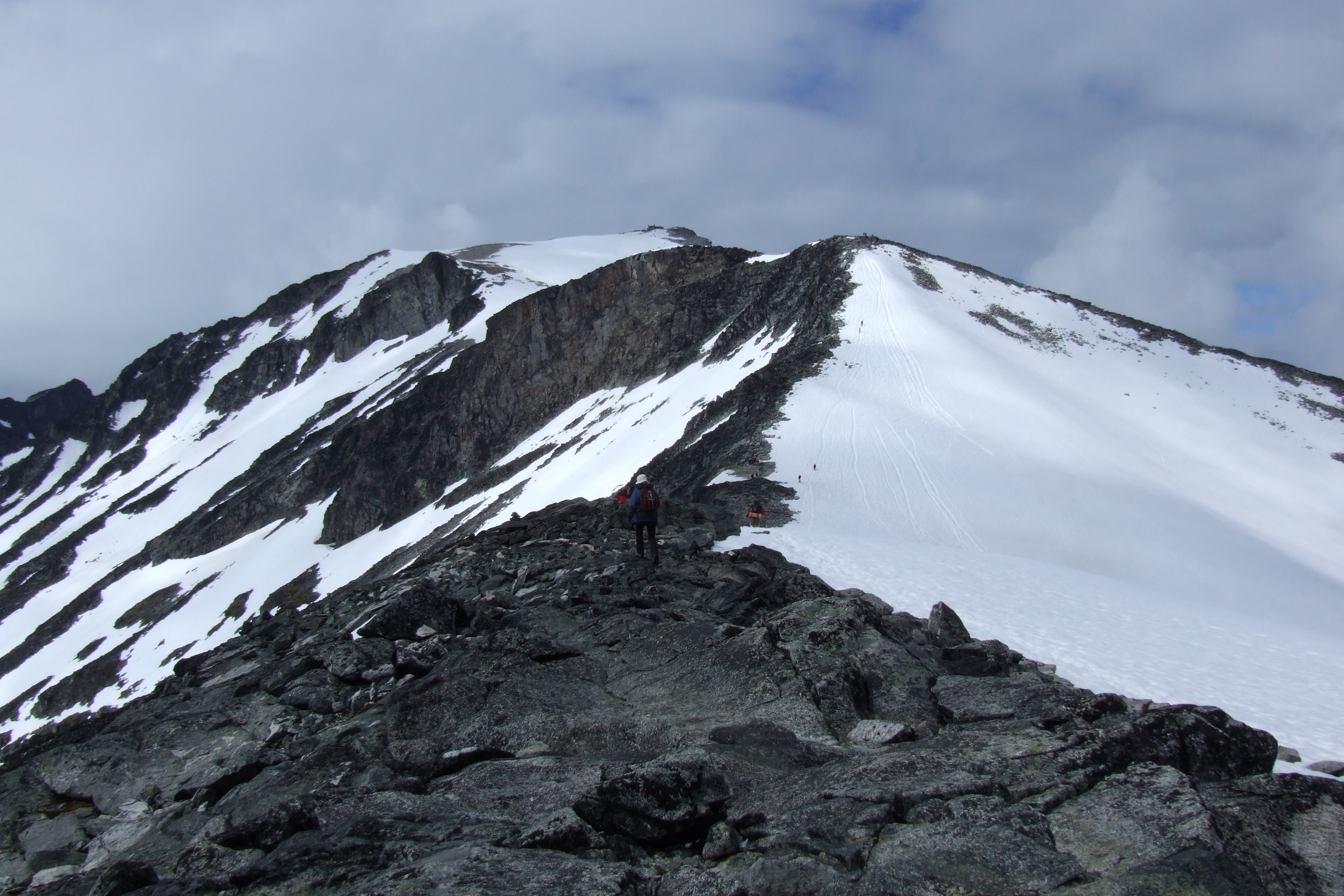

Highest point
- Elevation: 2,355 m (7,726 ft)
- Prominence: 20 m (66 ft)
- Parent peak: Galdhøpiggen
- Isolation: 0.38 km (0.24 mi)
- Coordinates: 61°38′06″N 8°19′33″E

Geography
- Interactive map of the mountain
- Location: Innlandet, Norway
- Parent range: Jotunheimen
- Topo map: 1518 II Galdhøpiggen

Climbing
- First ascent: 8 August 1844 (Baltazar Mathias Keilhau, C. Hansteen, Andresen)

Keilhaus topp is a mountain in Lom Municipality in Innlandet county, Norway. It is one of Norway's highest mountains, but is not always included in rankings due to its topographic prominence of only 20 metres (66 ft). The 2,355-metre (7,726 ft) tall mountain is located in the Jotunheimen mountains within Jotunheimen National Park. The mountain sits about 25 kilometres (16 mi) southwest of the village of Fossbergom and about 45 kilometres (28 mi) northeast of the village of Øvre Årdal. The mountain is surrounded by several other notable mountains including Galdhøpiggen (Norway's tallest mountain) to the west, Veslpiggen to the northwest, Galdhøe and Juvvasshøe to the north, Store Styggehøe to the southeast, Midtre Tverråtinden to the south, and Svellnosbreahesten and Store Tverråtinden to the southwest.

== Name ==
The professor Baltazar Mathias Keilhau, together with two students, tried to reach the top of Galdhøpiggen in 1844 - but he had to stop here because of bad weather.

== See also ==
- List of mountains of Norway by height
