= Skolteneset =

Headland in Sørkappøya, Norway

- Cape
- Coordinates: 76°31′23″N 16°29′42″E
- Location: Sørkappøya, Svalbard, Norway

Skolteneset (Scull Cape) is a headland of Sørkappøya, Svalbard. It has a length of about one kilometer and is the northernmost point of the island. It marks the southern entry of the large bay Sommerfeldtbukta. The headland is named from the discovery of human skulls at the site during an expedition in 1920.
