= Lyngebreen =

Glacier at Spitsbergen, Norway

Coordinates: 76.6190°N 16.6957°E

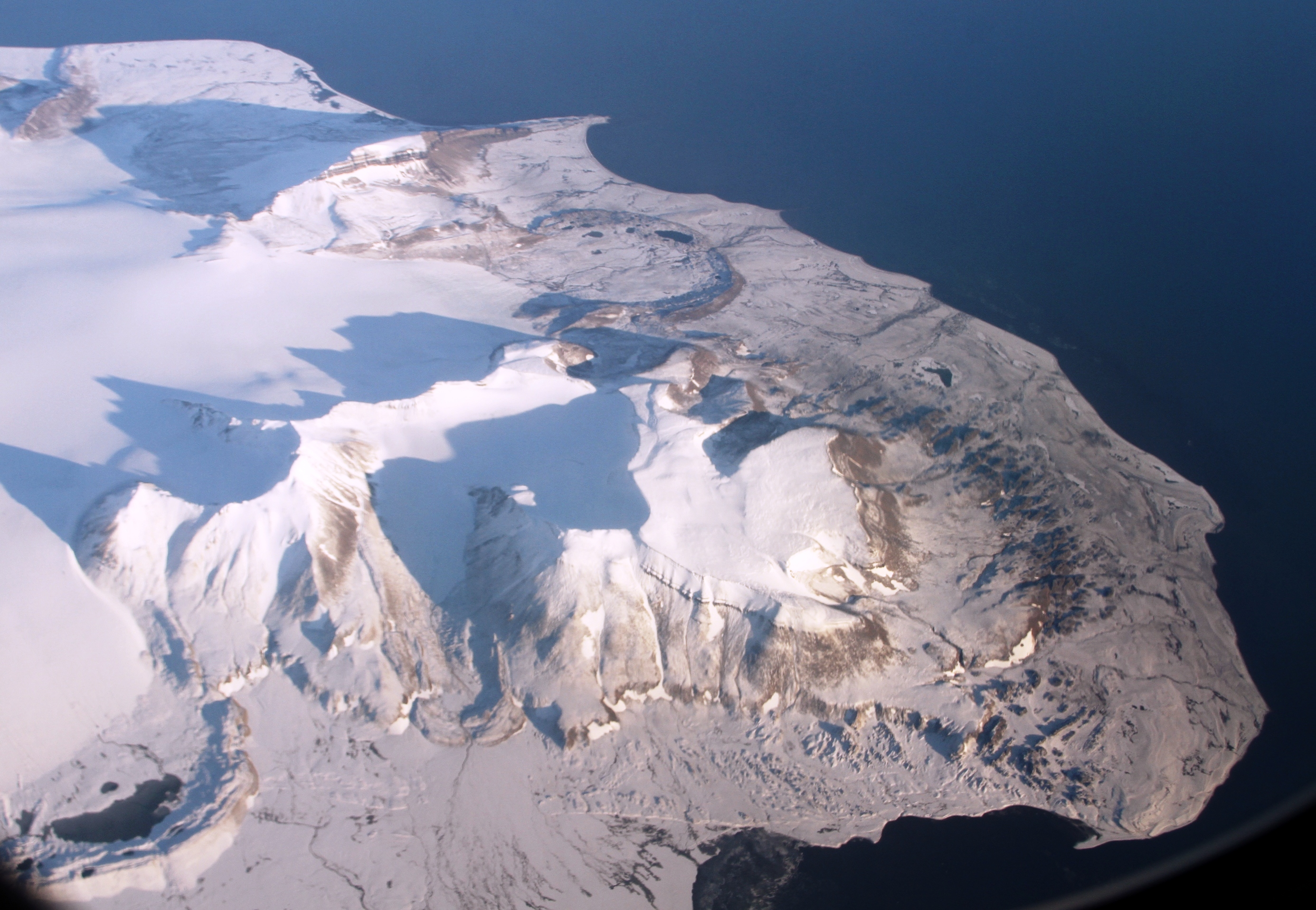
Aerial photograph of Sørkapp Land

Lyngebreen is a glacier in Sørkapp Land at Spitsbergen, Svalbard. It has a length of about four kilometers, and is located at the northern part of Kistefjellet, south of St. Nikolausfjellet. The glacier is named after Norwegian botanist and lichen specialist Bernt Arne Lynge.
