= St. Nikolausfjellet =

Mountain in Svalbard, Norway

Coordinates: 76.6367°N 16.6729°E

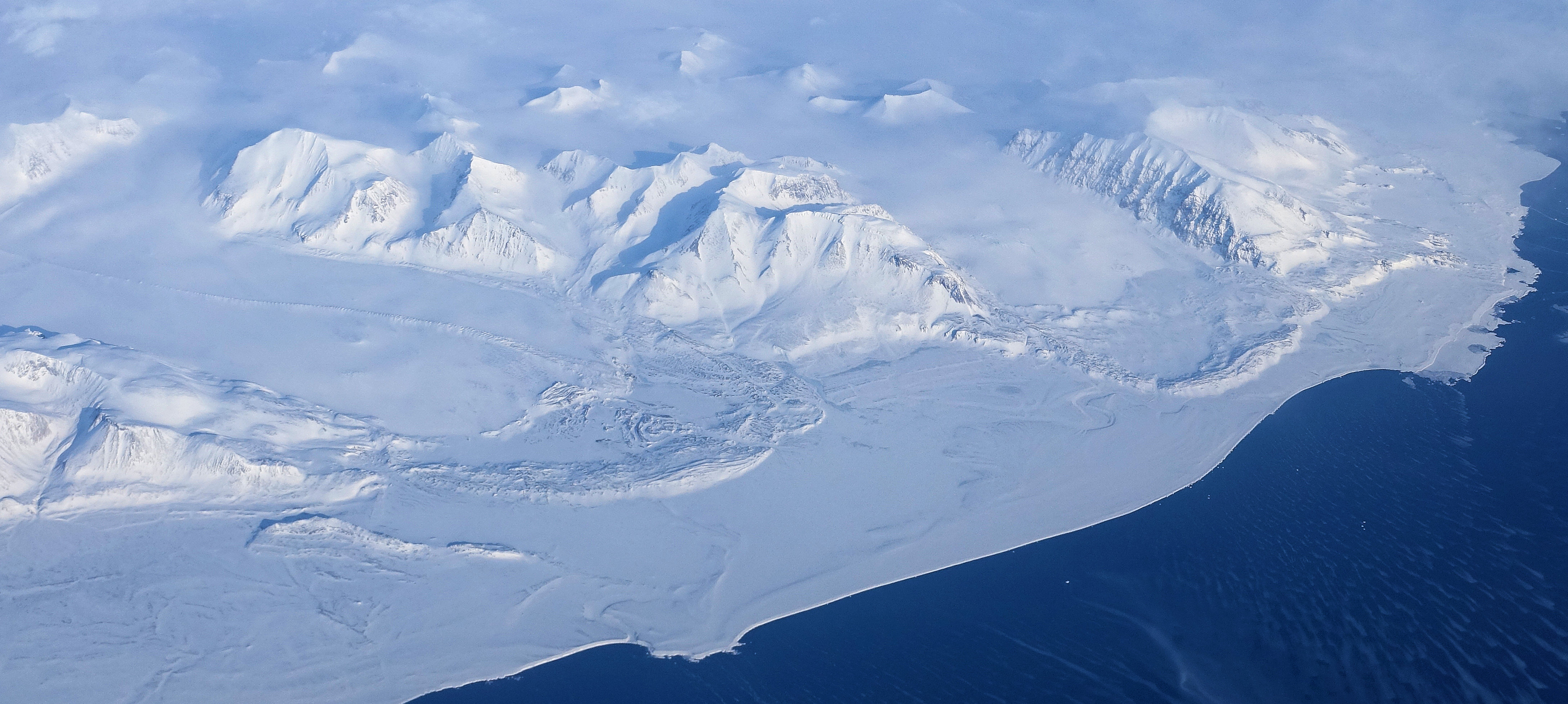
St. Nikolausfjellet in the top center, seen from a plane from the west

St. Nikolausfjellet is a mountain in Sørkapp Land at Spitsbergen, Svalbard. It has a height of 694 m.a.s.l., and is located north of Kistefjellet. It is surrounded by glaciers, with Lyngebreen to the south, Mathiasbreen to the southeast, St. Nikolausbreen to the northeast, and Belopol'skijbreen to the northwest. The mountain is named after Saint Nicholas, patron saint of sailors.
