= Lindbergtinden =

Mountain in Innlandet, Norway

- Lindebergtinden
- Interactive map of the mountain

Highest point
- Elevation: 2,120 m (6,960 ft)
- Prominence: 58 m (190 ft)
- Parent peak: Bukkehøe
- Isolation: 0.763 km (0.474 mi)
- Coordinates: 61°36′16″N 8°16′49″E

Geography
- Location: Innlandet, Norway
- Parent range: Jotunheimen
- Topo map: 1518 II Galdhøpiggen

Lindbergtinden is a mountain in Lom Municipality in Innlandet county, Norway. The 2,120-metre (6,960 ft) tall mountain is located in the Jotunheimen mountains within Jotunheimen National Park. The mountain sits about 30 kilometres (19 mi) southwest of the village of Fossbergom and about 40 kilometres (25 mi) northeast of the village of Øvre Årdal. The mountain is surrounded by several other notable mountains including Storjuvtinden and Store Tverråtinden to the north; Svellnosbreahesten and Midtre Tverråtinden to the northeast; Store Styggehøe and Bukkeholshøe to the southeast;Bukkeholstindene and Tverrbottindene to the south; and Sauhøe to the west.

== See also ==
- List of mountains of Norway by height
