= Mathiasbreen =

Glacier at Spitsbergen, Norway

Coordinates: 76.6281°N 16.7917°E

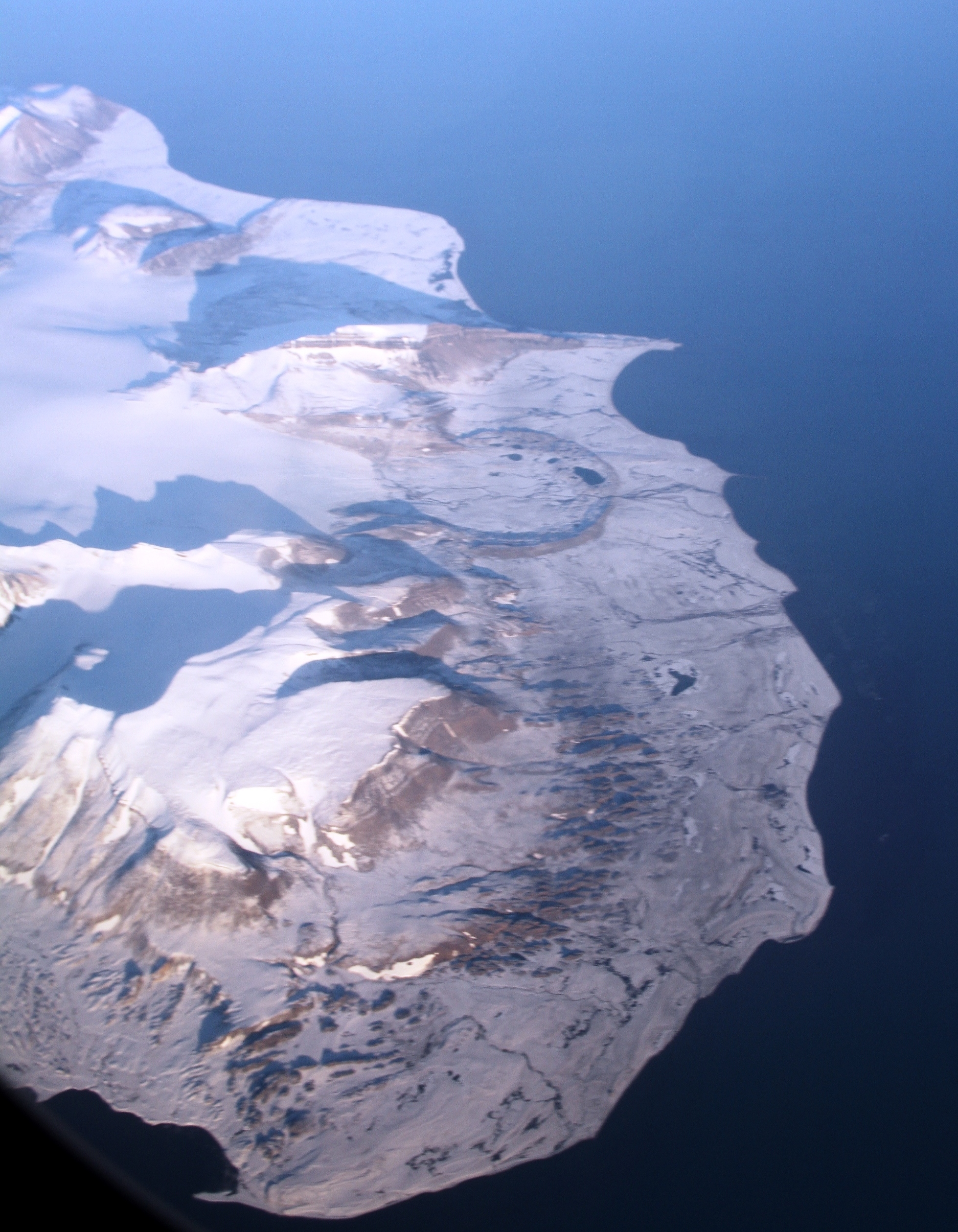
Kistefjellet mountain, Mathiasbreen glacier, and morains in Sörkapp Land, southernmost Svalbard.

Mathiasbreen is a glacier in Sørkapp Land at Spitsbergen, Svalbard. It has a length of about five kilometers, and is located between the mountains Keilhaufjellet and Kistefjellet. The glacier is named after Norwegian geologist Baltazar Mathias Keilhau.
