= Bukkehøe =

Mountain in Innlandet, Norway

- Interactive map of the mountain

Highest point
- Elevation: 2,314 m (7,592 ft)
- Prominence: 352 m (1,155 ft)
- Parent peak: Galdhøpiggen
- Isolation: 3.1 km (1.9 mi)
- Listing: #18 in Norway
- Coordinates: 61°36′15″N 8°15′59″E

Geography
- Location: Innlandet, Norway
- Parent range: Jotunheimen
- Topo map: 1518 II Galdhøpiggen

Bukkehøe is a mountain in Lom Municipality in Innlandet county, Norway. The 2,314-metre (7,592 ft) tall mountain is located in the Jotunheimen mountains within Jotunheimen National Park. The mountain sits about 30 kilometres (19 mi) southwest of the village of Fossbergom and about 40 kilometres (25 mi) northeast of the village of Øvre Årdal. The mountain is surrounded by several other notable mountains including Storjuvtinden, Svellnosbreahesten, Store Tverråtinden, and Midtre Tverråtinden to the northeast; Sauhøe to the west; Bukkeholstindene and Tverrbottindene to the southwest; Store Styggehøe and Bukkeholshøe to the southeast; and Lindbergtinden to the east.

== Name ==
The first element is bukk which means 'buck' (as in a male reindeer). The last element is the finite form of hø which is a word for a 'large and round mountain'.

== See also ==
- List of mountains of Norway by height
