= Svellnosbreahesten =

Mountain in Innlandet, Norway

- Interactive map of the mountain

Highest point
- Elevation: 2,182 m (7,159 ft)
- Prominence: 32 m (105 ft)
- Parent peak: Store Tverråtinden
- Isolation: 0.554 km (0.344 mi)
- Coordinates: 61°37′16″N 8°18′23″E

Geography
- Location: Innlandet, Norway
- Parent range: Jotunheimen
- Topo map: 1518 II Galdhøpiggen

Svellnosbreahesten is a mountain in Lom Municipality in Innlandet county, Norway. The 2,182-metre (7,159 ft) tall mountain is located in the Jotunheimen mountains within Jotunheimen National Park. The mountain sits about 28 kilometres (17 mi) southwest of the village of Fossbergom and about 42 kilometres (26 mi) northeast of the village of Øvre Årdal. The mountain is surrounded by several other notable mountains including Galdhøpiggen, Keilhaus topp to the northeast; Veslpiggen and Storjuvtinden to the north; Skardstinden to the northwest; Store Tverråtinden, Bukkehøe, and Lindbergtinden to the southwest; and Midtre Tverråtinden and Store Styggehøe to the southeast.

== See also ==
- List of mountains of Norway by height
