= Belopol'skijbreen =

Glacier in Svalbard, Norway

Coordinates: 76.6648°N 16.5974°E

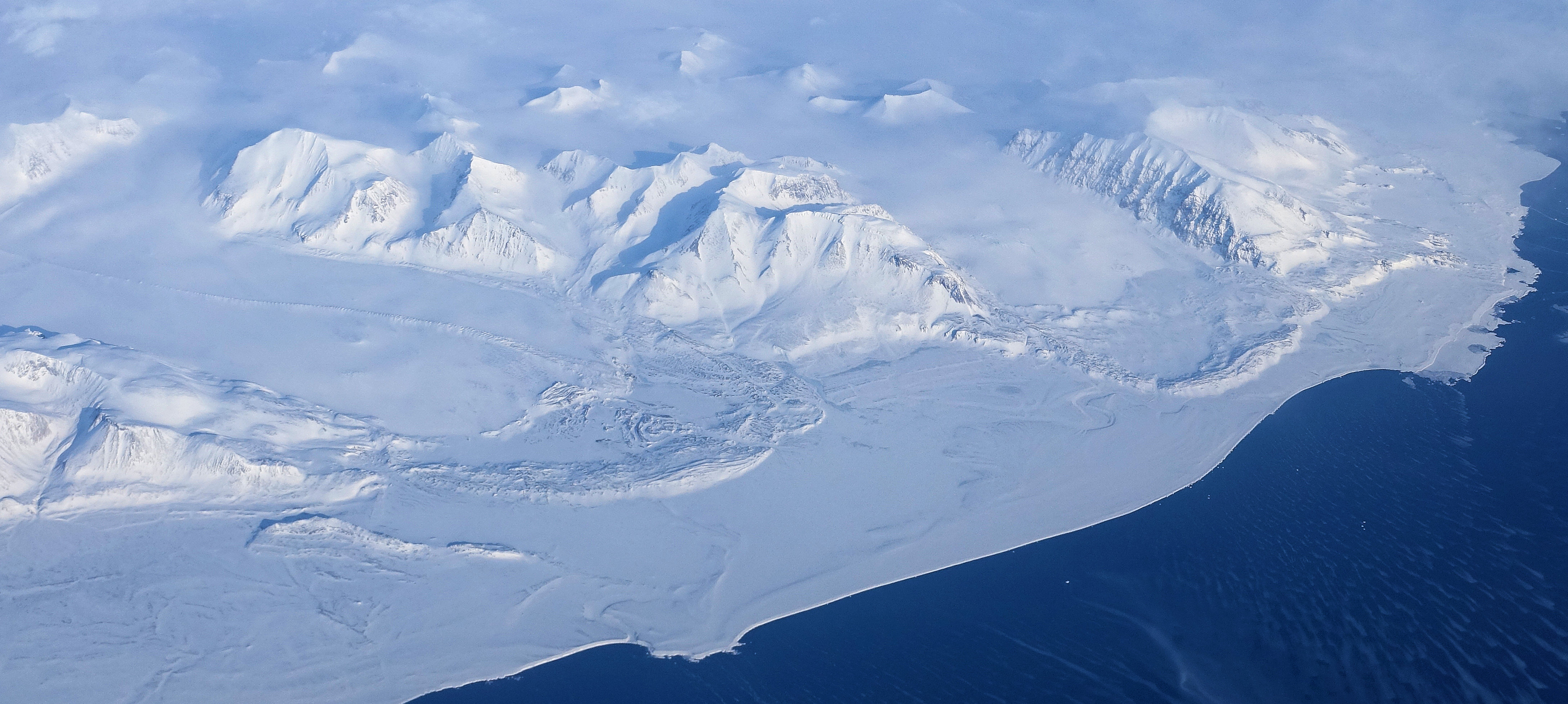
The Belopol'skij glacier seen on the left, flowing past St. Nikolausfjellet

Belopol'skijbreen is a glacier in Sørkapp Land at Spitsbergen, Svalbard. It is located northwest of St. Nikolausfjellet and flows towards the coastal plain of Øyrlandet. The glacier is named after Russian scientist Aristarkh Apollonovich Belopol'skij.
