= Bernt Arne Lynge =

Norwegian lichenologist

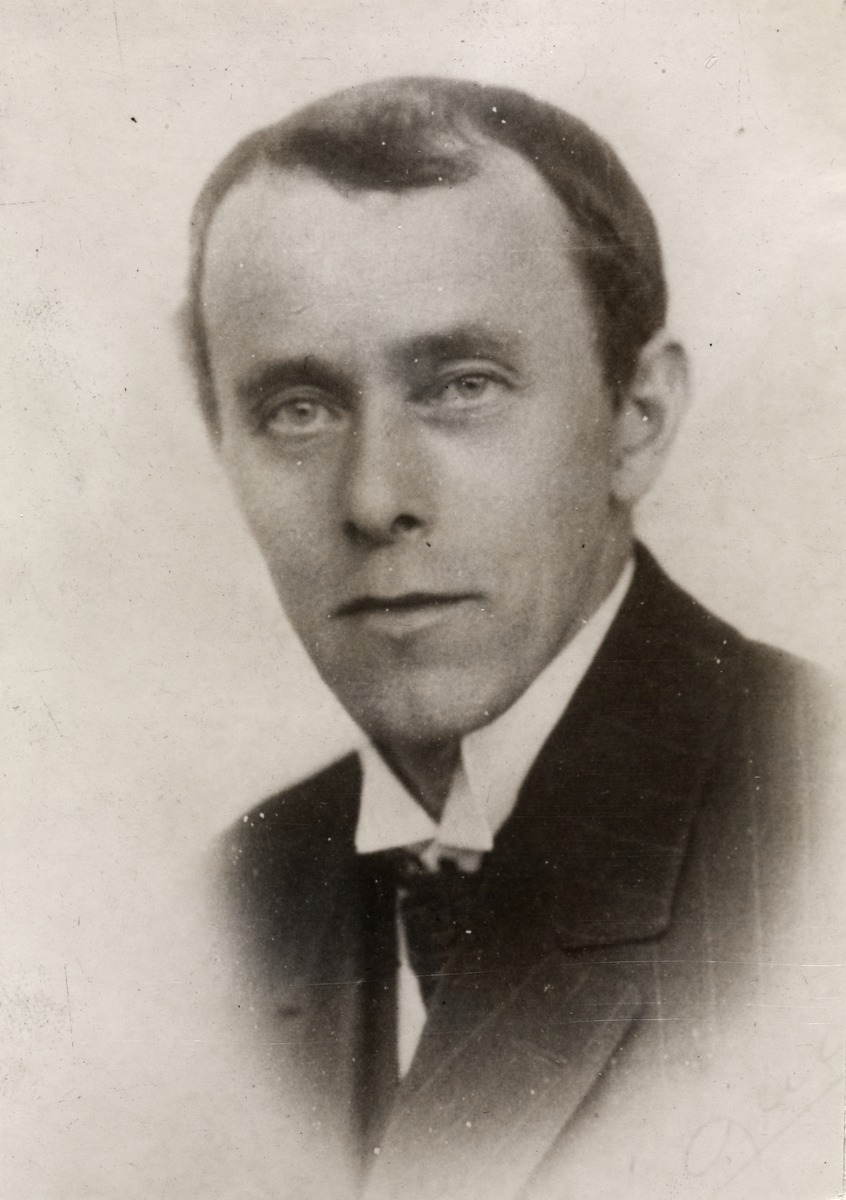
Bernt Arne in the 1930s

Bernt Arne Lynge (9 July 1884 – 28 January 1942) was a Norwegian botanist. He specialized in lichen, in particular species from the Arctic and Antarctica.

Lynge was born at Lyngør in Aust-Agder, Norway. After graduation, he was employed as an assistant in the University of Oslo Botanical Garden and later curator at the Natural History Museum at the University of Oslo. He was appointed professor of botany at the University of Oslo from 1935. Lynge was elected to the Norwegian Academy of Science. His publications included Studies on the Lichen Flora of Norway (1921) and Vascular Plants from Novaya Semlyen (1923). The Spitsbergen glacier Lyngebreen is named after him.

== See also ==
- Category:Taxa named by Bernt Arne Lynge
