= St. Nikolausbreen =

Glacier in Svalbard, Norway

Coordinates: 76.6437°N 16.6969°E

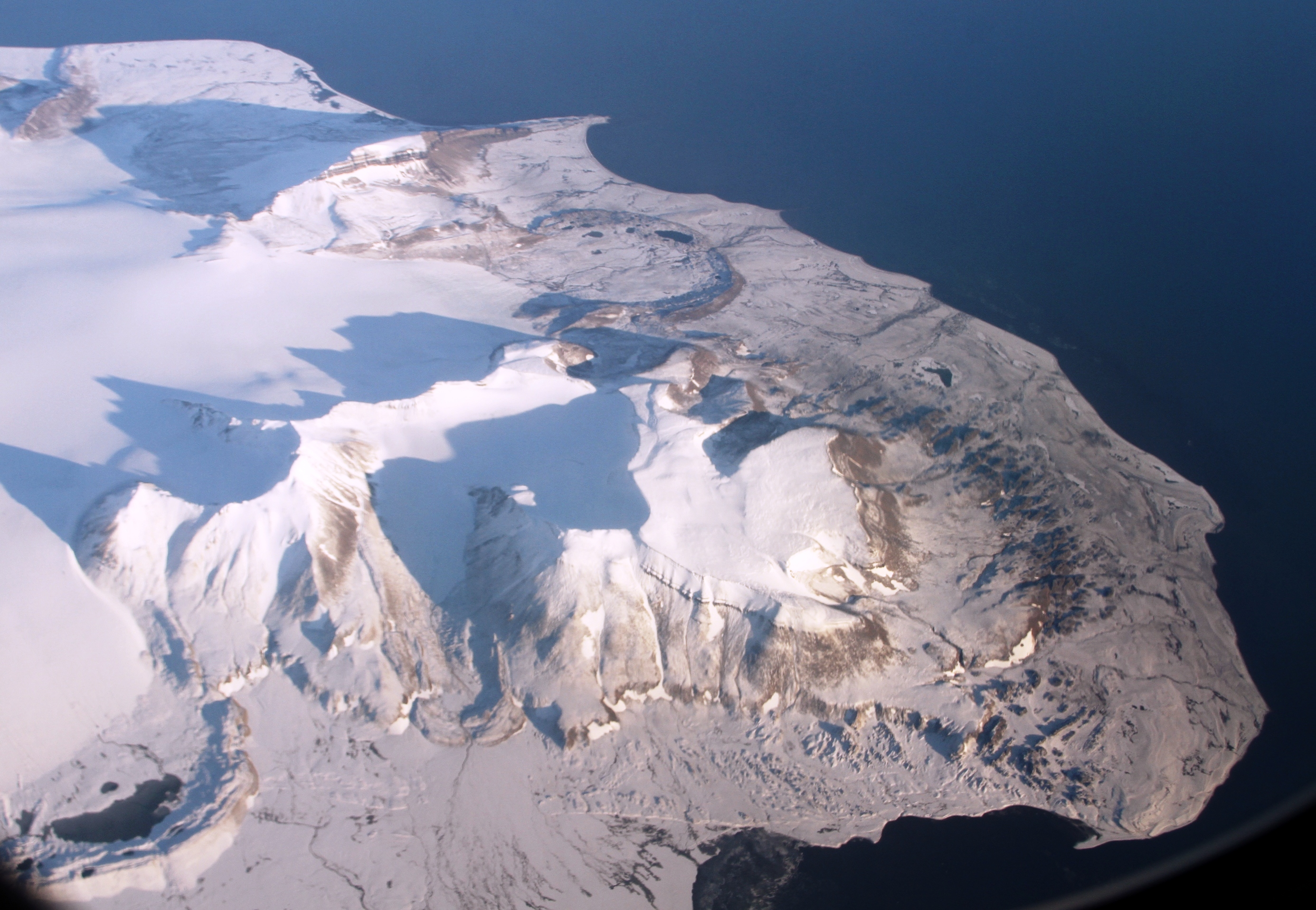

St. Nikolausbreen is a glacier in Sørkapp Land at Spitsbergen, Svalbard. It is located northeast of St. Nikolausfjellet. The glacier is named after Saint Nicholas, archbishop and patron saint of sailors.
