= Sørkapp Bird Sanctuary =

Protected area in Svalbard, Norway

Coordinates: 76°28′50″N 16°33′41″E

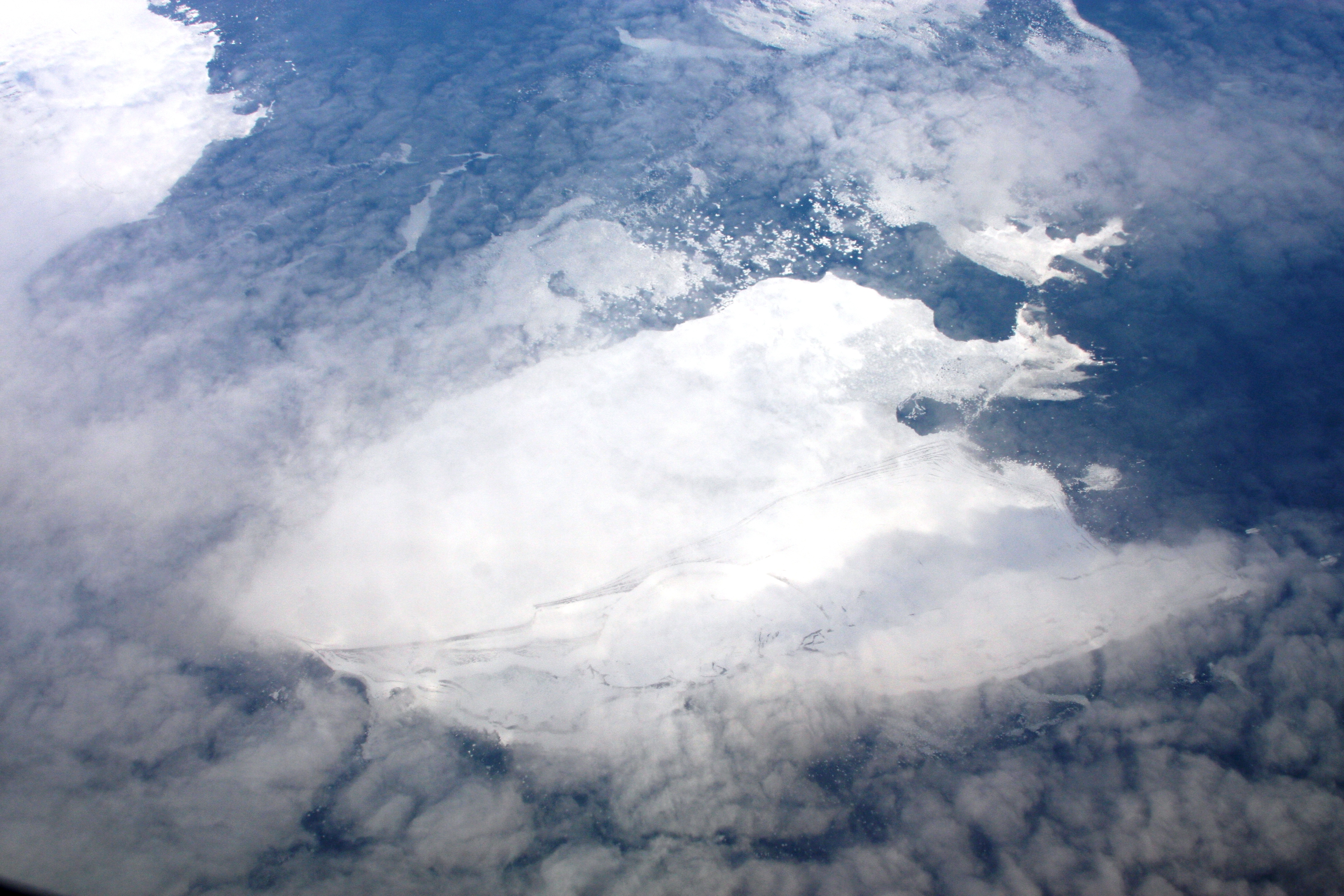
Sørkappøya.

Sørkapp Bird Sanctuary (Norwegian: Sørkapp fuglereservat) is a bird reserve at Svalbard, Norway, established in 1973. It includes Sørkappøya and other islands off Sørkapp Land, Spitsbergen. The protected area covers a total area of 3,599ha
