= Bukkeholshøe =

Mountain in Innlandet, Norway

- Bukkeholshøi (unofficial)
- Interactive map of the mountain

Highest point
- Elevation: 1,865 m (6,119 ft)
- Prominence: 108 m (354 ft)
- Parent peak: Galdhøpiggen
- Isolation: 1.1 km (0.68 mi)
- Coordinates: 61°34′47″N 8°21′21″E

Geography
- Location: Innlandet, Norway
- Parent range: Jotunheimen
- Topo map: 1518 II Galdhøpiggen

Bukkeholshøe is a mountain in Lom Municipality in Innlandet county, Norway. The 1,865-metre (6,119 ft) tall mountain is located in the Jotunheimen mountains within Jotunheimen National Park. The mountain sits about 32 kilometres (20 mi) southwest of the village of Fossbergom and about 41 kilometres (25 mi) northeast of the village of Øvre Årdal. The mountain is surrounded by several other notable mountains including Leirhøe to the east; Nørdre Hellstugutinden and Midtre Hellstugutinden to the southeast; Urdadalstindan and Semelholstinden to the south; Tverrbytthornet and Kyrkja to the southwest; Store Bukkeholstinden and the Tverrbottindene ridge to the west; Bukkehøe and Lindbergtinden to the northwest; and Store Styggehøe to the north.

== See also ==
- List of mountains of Norway by height
