= Baltazar Mathias Keilhau =

Norwegian geologist (1797–1858)

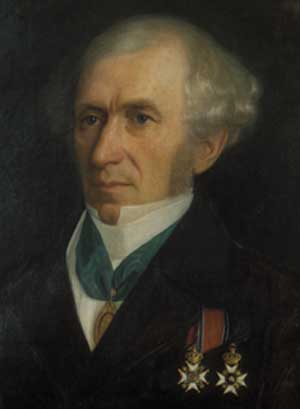
- Keilhau portrayed by Christiane Schreiber
- Born: 2 November 1797; Gjøvik
- Died: 1 January 1858 (aged 60)
- Occupations: Geologist and mountain pioneer
- Awards: Order of Vasa; Order of the Polar Star; Order of St. Olav

Balthazar Mathias Keilhau (2 November 1797 – 1 January 1858) was a Norwegian geologist and mountain pioneer. He is regarded as the founder of the discipline of geology in Norway, and has also been credited for the discovery of the Jotunheimen mountain range.

== Personal life ==
Keilhau was born in Gjøvik to parish priest Johan David Bertram Keilhau and Johanne Marie Bodom. In 1830 he married Christine Kemp. His wife had been engaged to mathematician Nils Henrik Abel, a friend of Keilhau. When Abel died of tuberculosis in 1829, Keilhau was worried about his fiancé, and offered to marry her, although they had never met, and she accepted. Keilhau died in Christiania in 1858.

== Career ==
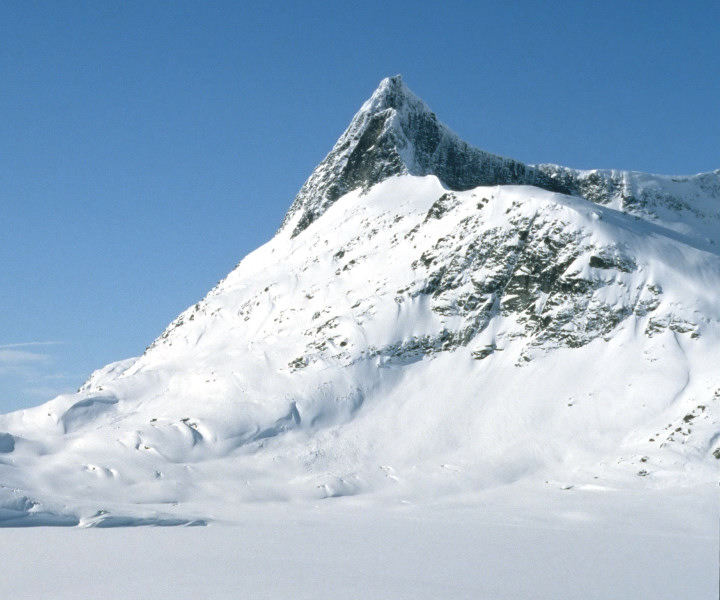
Falketind was first climbed in 1820 by Keilhau, Christian Peder Bianco Boeck and Ole Urdi

Keilhau is regarded as the founder of geology in Norway. He graduated from the Christiania Cathedral School in 1816. In 1821 he graduated in mining, the first one at the University in Christiania, and received further industrial practice in Kongsberg. He subsequently studied mineralogy in Berlin, and geology in Saxony.

Keilhau made the first ascent of Falketind in 1820 along with two other climbers. He has later been labeled the "discoverer" of the mountain range of Jotunheimen. The mountain of Keilhaus topp is named after him. The 1820 journey, which he made along with fellow student Christian Boeck, was thoroughly documented in the article "Nogle efterretninger om et hidtil ubekendt stykke af det söndenfjeldske Norge".

He lectured at the Royal Frederick University in Christiania from 1826. In 1827 he joined an expedition to Bjørnøya and Svalbard. At Svalbard, the mountain of Keilhaufjellet and the glacier of Mathiasbreen are named after him.

He was appointed professor from 1834. Among his publications is the three-volume Gaea Norvegica (1838–1850). The first volume from 1838 describes the Oslo Geological Region, the second volume from 1844 covers Northern Norway, and the third volume from 1850 covers Southern Norway. This work is the first complete overview of the Geology of Norway.

He was decorated Knight of the Order of Vasa, Knight of the Order of the Polar Star, and Knight of the Order of St. Olav.
