= Kistefjellet =

Mountain in Svalbard, Norway

Coordinates: 76.6054°N 16.6597°E

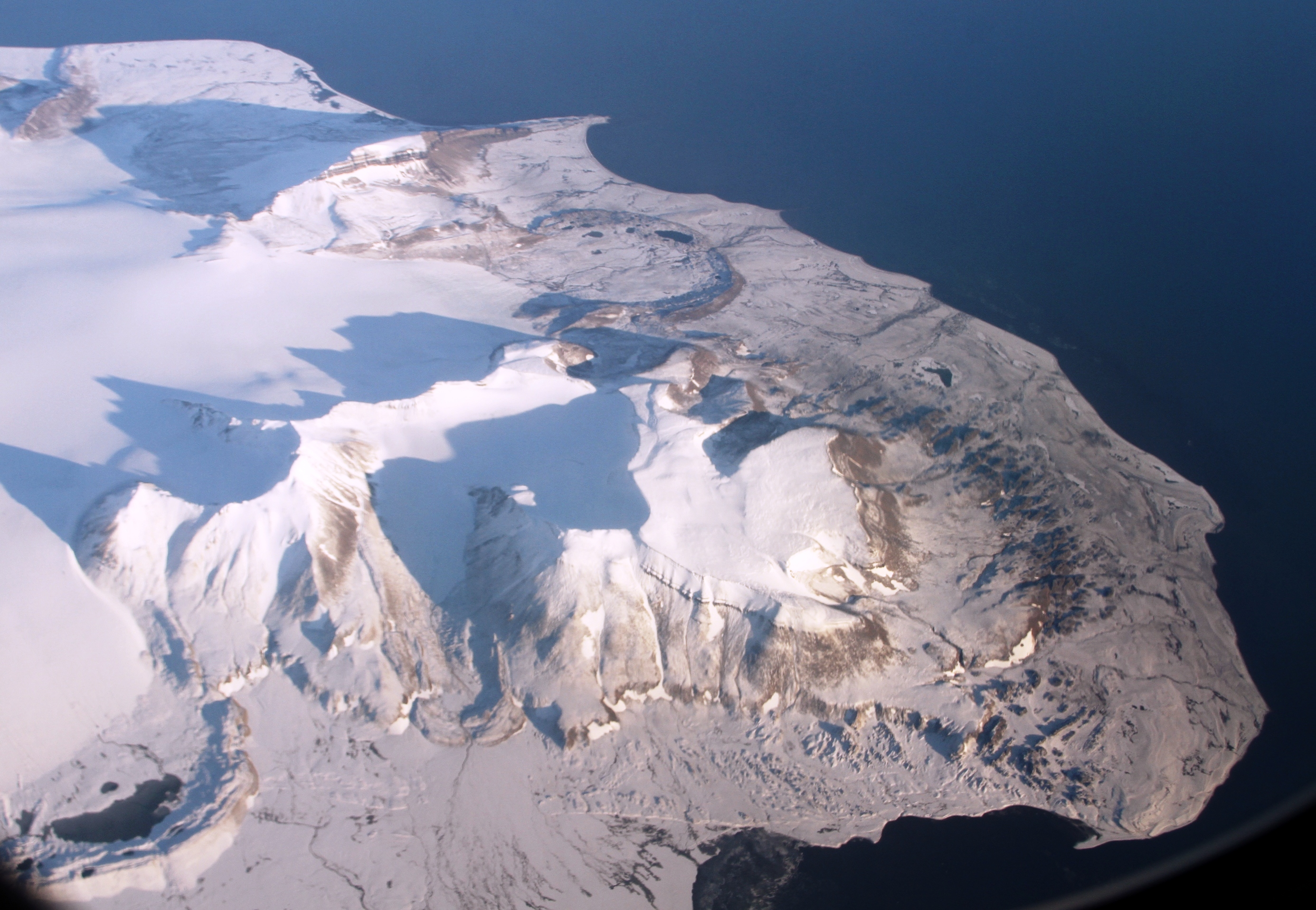
Kistefjellet in Sørkapp Land

Kistefjellet is a mountain in Sørkapp Land at Spitsbergen, Svalbard. It has a height of 665 m.a.s.l., and is the southernmost mountain of Spitsbergen. Nearby mountains are St. Nikolausfjellet to the north, separated from Kistefjellet by Lyngebreen, and Keilhaufjellet to the northeast, separated by the glacier Mathiasbreen.
