= Store Tverråtinden =

Mountain in Innlandet, Norway

- Interactive map of the mountain

Highest point
- Elevation: 2,308 m (7,572 ft)
- Prominence: 188 m (617 ft)
- Parent peak: Galdhøpiggen
- Isolation: 1.7 km (1.1 mi)
- Coordinates: 61°36′55″N 8°18′07″E

Geography
- Location: Innlandet, Norway
- Parent range: Jotunheimen
- Topo map: 1518 II Galdhøpiggen

Store Tverråtinden is a mountain in Lom Municipality in Innlandet county, Norway. The 2,308-metre (7,572 ft) tall mountain is located in the Jotunheimen mountains within Jotunheimen National Park. The mountain sits about 28 kilometres (17 mi) southwest of the village of Fossbergom and about 43 kilometres (27 mi) northeast of the village of Øvre Årdal. The mountain is surrounded by several other notable mountains including Storjuvtinden and Svellnosbreahesten to the north; Sauhøe to the west; Bukkehøe, Lindbergtinden, and Bukkeholstindene to the southwest; Store Styggehøe and Bukkeholshøe to the southeast; and Midtre Tverråtinden to the east.

== See also ==
- List of mountains of Norway by height
