= Store Styggehøe =

Mountain in Innlandet, Norway

Store Styggehøe Styggehøe
- Interactive map of the mountain

Highest point
- Elevation: 2,213 m (7,260 ft)
- Prominence: 233 m (764 ft)
- Parent peak: Bukkehøe
- Isolation: 2.6 km (1.6 mi) to Store Tverråtinden
- Coordinates: 61°35′50″N 8°20′48″E

Geography
- Location: Innlandet, Norway
- Parent range: Jotunheimen
- Topo map: 1518 II Galdhøpiggen

Store Styggehøe or Styggehøe is a mountain in Lom Municipality in Innlandet county, Norway. The 2,213-metre (7,260 ft) tall mountain is located in the Jotunheimen mountains within Jotunheimen National Park. The mountain sits about 30 kilometres (19 mi) southwest of the village of Fossbergom and about 43 kilometres (27 mi) northeast of the village of Øvre Årdal. The mountain is surrounded by several other notable mountains including Galdhøpiggen, Svellnosbreahesten, and Midtre Tverråtinden to the northwest; Bukkehøe and Lindbergtinden to the west; Store Bukkeholstinden to the southwest; Bukkeholshøe to the southeast; Leirhøe and Veobreahesten to the east; and Spiterhøe and Skauthøe to the northeast.

== See also ==
- List of mountains of Norway by height
