= Galdhøpiggen Summer Ski Centre =

Ski resort in Galdhøpiggen, Norway

- Location in Norway Galdhøpiggen Summer Ski Centre (Norway)
- Location: Juvbreen and Innlandet, Norway
- Nearest city: Bergen
- Coordinates: 61°39′57″N 8°21′46.5″E
- Top elevation: 2,200 m (7,200 ft) (onthesnow)
- Base elevation: 1,850 m (6,070 ft) (onthesnow)
- Trails: 1
- Total length: 1.5 km (0.93 mi)
- Lift system: 1
- Website: www.gpss.no

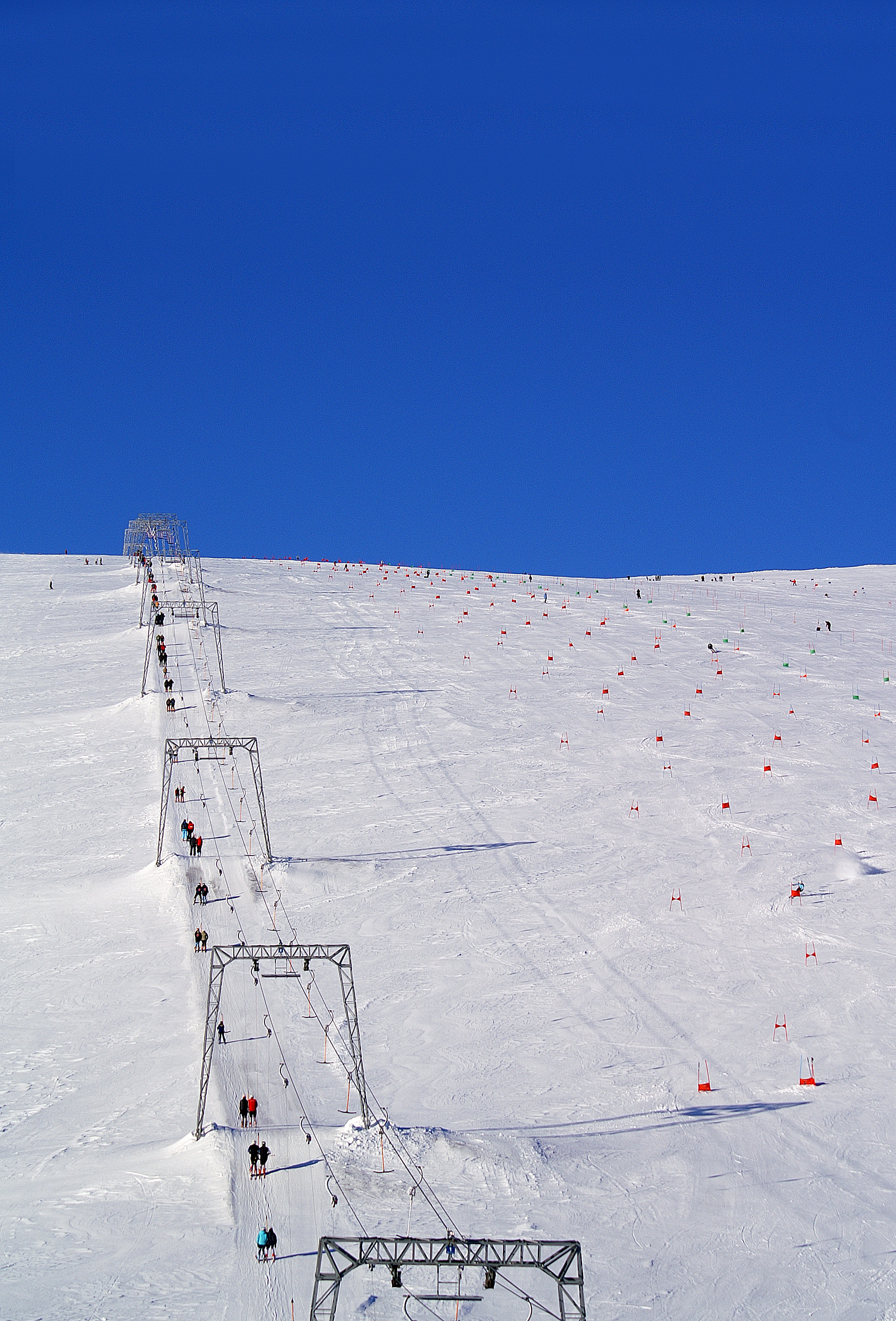
Galdhøpiggen Summer Ski Centre

Galdhøpiggen summer ski centre is a glacial ski resort which lies in Juvbreen at the foot of Galdhøpiggen in Innlandet. The resort has a T-bar lift, with capacity of 1200 persons per hour, and one slope which is 1400 meters long with a 350-meter height difference. The ground is well suited to both alpine skiing and snowboarding. It is the highest located ski centre in Scandinavia. The season is usually from late May until October.
