= Midtre Tverråtinden =

Mountain in Innlandet, Norway

- Interactive map of the mountain

Highest point
- Elevation: 2,302 m (7,552 ft)
- Prominence: 116 m (381 ft)
- Parent peak: Store Tverråtinden
- Isolation: 0.749 km (0.465 mi)
- Listing: #20 in Norway
- Coordinates: 61°36′52″N 8°18′57″E

Geography
- Location: Innlandet, Norway
- Parent range: Jotunheimen
- Topo map: 1518 II Galdhøpiggen

Midtre Tverråtinden is a mountain in Lom Municipality in Innlandet county, Norway. The 2,302-metre (7,552 ft) tall mountain is located in the Jotunheimen mountains within Jotunheimen National Park. The mountain sits about 28 kilometres (17 mi) southwest of the village of Fossbergom and about 43 kilometres (27 mi) northeast of the village of Øvre Årdal. The mountain is surrounded by several other notable mountains including Svellnosbreahesten to the north; Store Tverråtinden to the west, Bukkehøe and Lindbergtinden to the southwest, Store Bukkeholstinden to the southwest, and Store Styggehøe and Bukkeholshøe to the southeast.

== See also ==
- List of mountains of Norway by height
