= Visdalen =

Valley in Innlandet, Norway

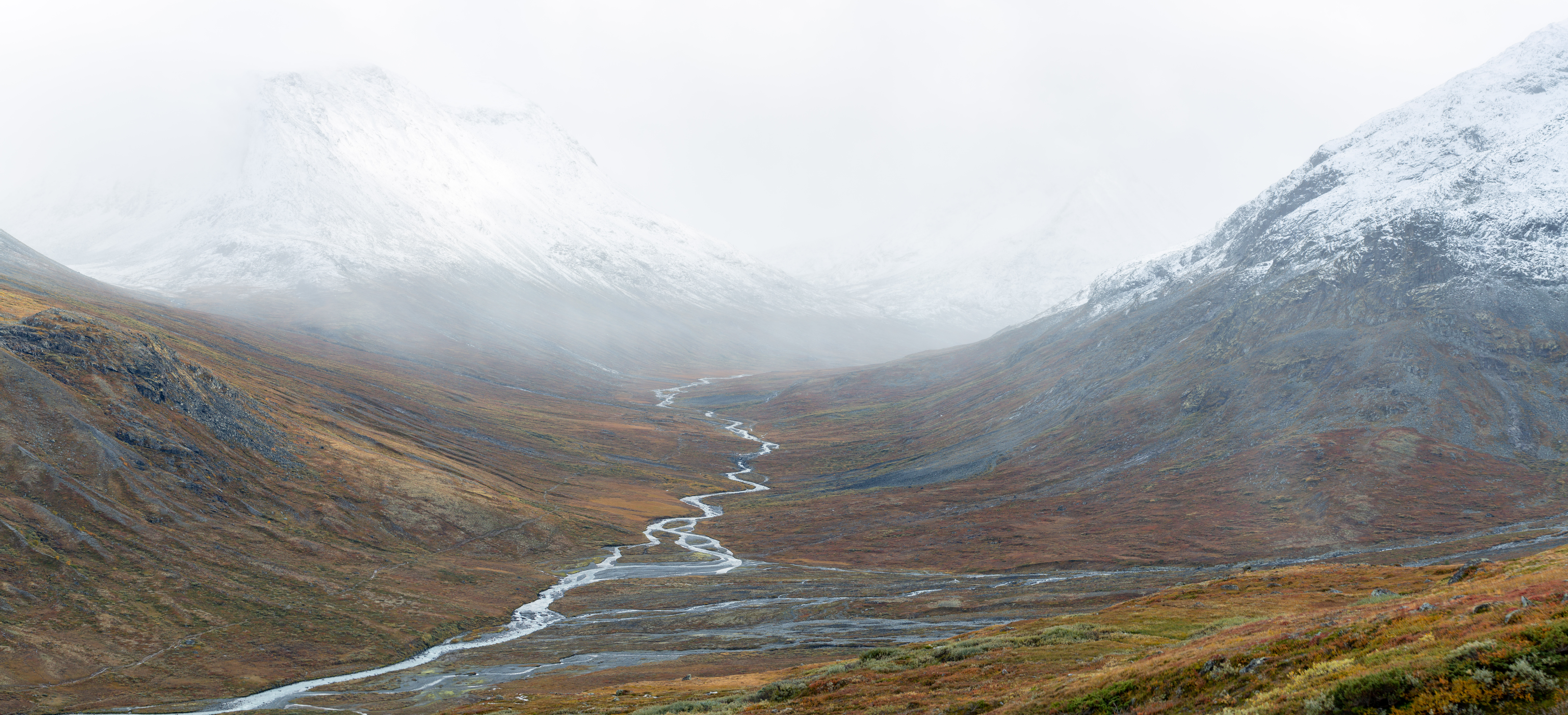
- Looking southwards down Visdalen in Autumn as seen from the way up to Galdhøpiggen from Spiterstulen.
- Floor elevation: 515–1,436 m (1,690–4,711 ft)
- Length: 25 km (16 mi) S-N

Geology
- Type: River valley

Geography
- Location: Innlandet, Norway
- Coordinates: 61.6726°N 8.4461°E
- River: Visa

Location
- Interactive map of the valley

Visdalen is a valley in Lom Municipality in Innlandet county, Norway. The 25-kilometre (16 mi) long valley lies on the southeast side of the Bøverdalen valley. The valley begins at the mountain Kyrkja in the Jotunheimen mountains, just south of the mountain Galdhøpiggen, the tallest mountain in Norway. It then follows the river Visa to the north. At the end of the valley, the river joins the river Bøvra and the valley becomes part of the Bøverdalen valley.

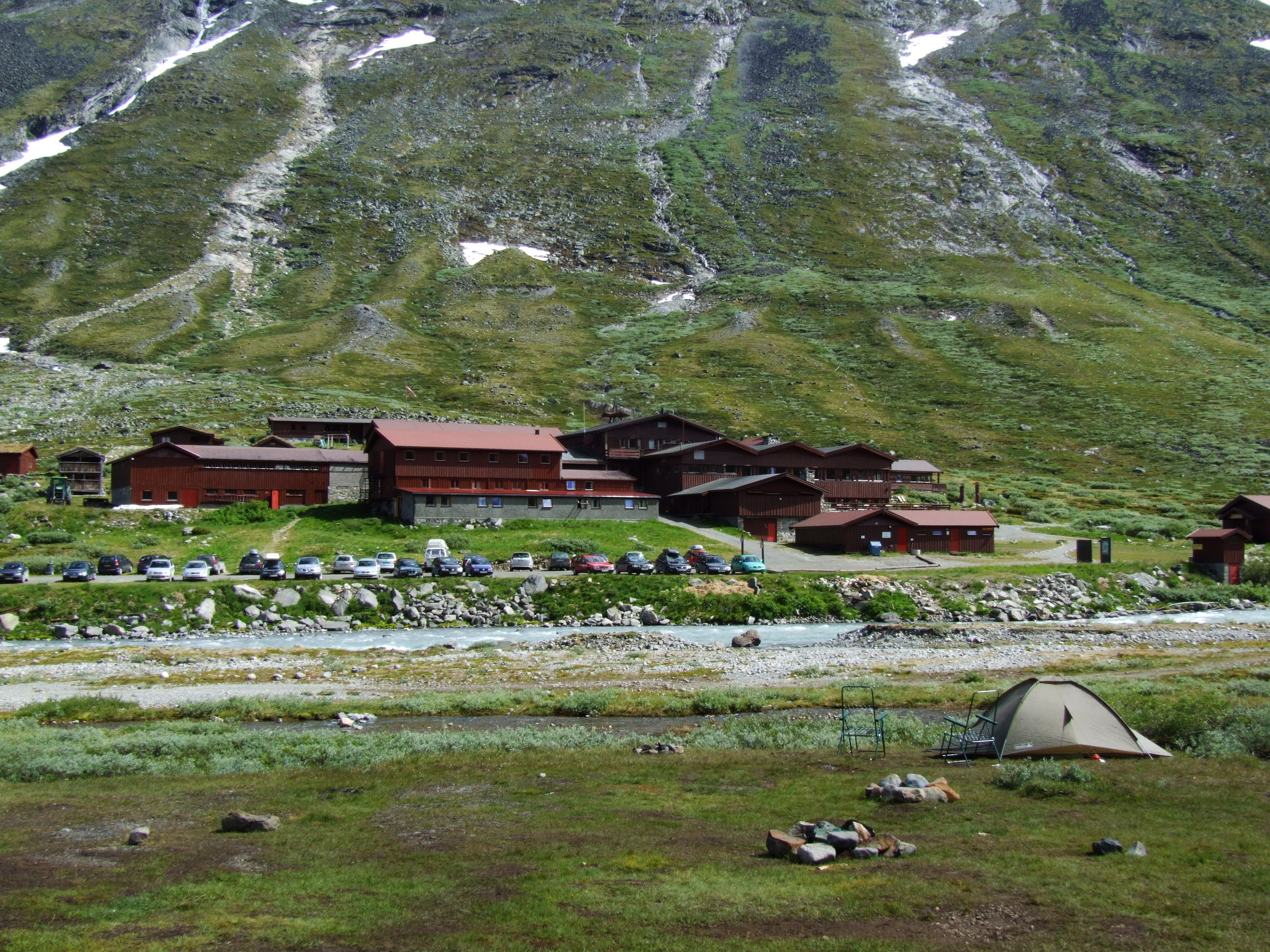
The mountain cabin Spiterstulen in Visdalen.

The inner part of the valley is located inside Jotunheimen National Park. The valley is notable because it runs in between two of Norway's tallest mountains: Galdhøpiggen and Glittertinden. There is a road that runs about two-thirds of the length of the valley, stopping at the Spiterstulen hotel, one of the largest such facilities in the Jotunheimen mountains.
