= Galdhøpiggen =

Mountain in Innlandet, Norway

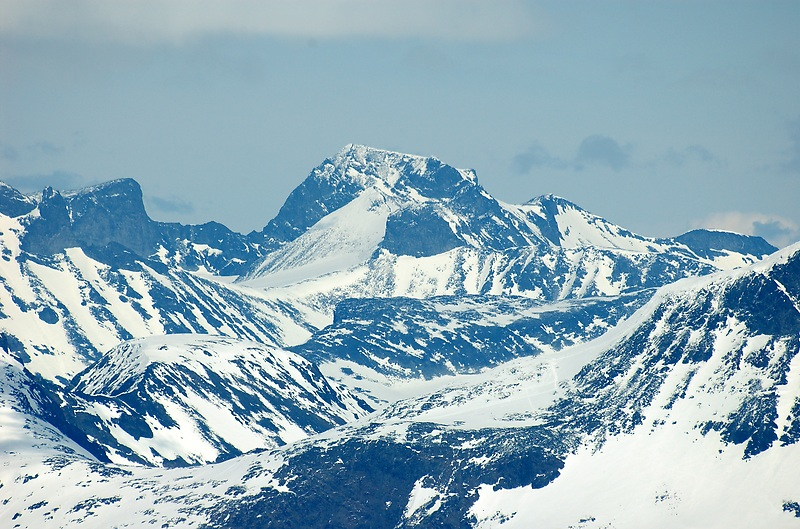
- Galdhøpiggen viewed from the west (Fannaråki)

Highest point
- Elevation: 2,469 m (8,100 ft)
- Prominence: 2,436 m (7,992 ft)
- Parent peak: Mont Blanc
- Isolation: 1,567.4 km (973.9 mi)
- Listing: Country high point Ultra
- Coordinates: 61°38′11″N 8°18′45″E

Naming
- Pronunciation: [ˈɡɑ̀ɫhøːˌpɪɡn̩]

Geography
- Interactive map of the mountain
- Location: Innlandet, Norway
- Parent range: Jotunheimen
- Topo map: 1518 II Galdhøpiggen

Climbing
- First ascent: 1850 (Steinar Sulheim, S. Flaatten and L. Arnesen)
- Easiest route: Hiking

Galdhøpiggen (Norwegian pronunciation: [ˈɡɑ̀ɫhøːˌpɪɡːən]) is the highest mountain in Norway, Scandinavia, and Northern Europe. The 2,469-metre-tall (8,100 ft) mountain is located in Lom Municipality in Innlandet county, Norway. It is in the Jotunheimen mountains within Jotunheimen National Park. The mountain sits about 25 kilometres (16 mi) southwest of the village of Fossbergom and about 45 kilometres (28 mi) northeast of the village of Øvre Årdal.

The mountain is surrounded by several other notable mountains including Keilhaus topp to the east; Store Styggehøe to the southeast; Svellnosbreahesten, Midtre Tverråtinden, and Store Tverråtinden to the south; Storjuvtinden and Skardstinden to the west; Veslpiggen, Storgrovtinden, and Storgrovhøe to the northwest; and Galdhøe and Juvvasshøe to the northeast.

== Etymology ==
Galdhøpiggen means "the peak/spike (piggen) of the mountain Galdhø." The first element in the name of the mountain is gald (m.) which means "steep mountain road". The part of the valley Bøverdalen closest to the mountain is called Galde. The last element is hø (f.) which means "(big and) rounded mountain." An old road between Gudbrandsdalen and Sogn passes beneath the mountain.

== History ==
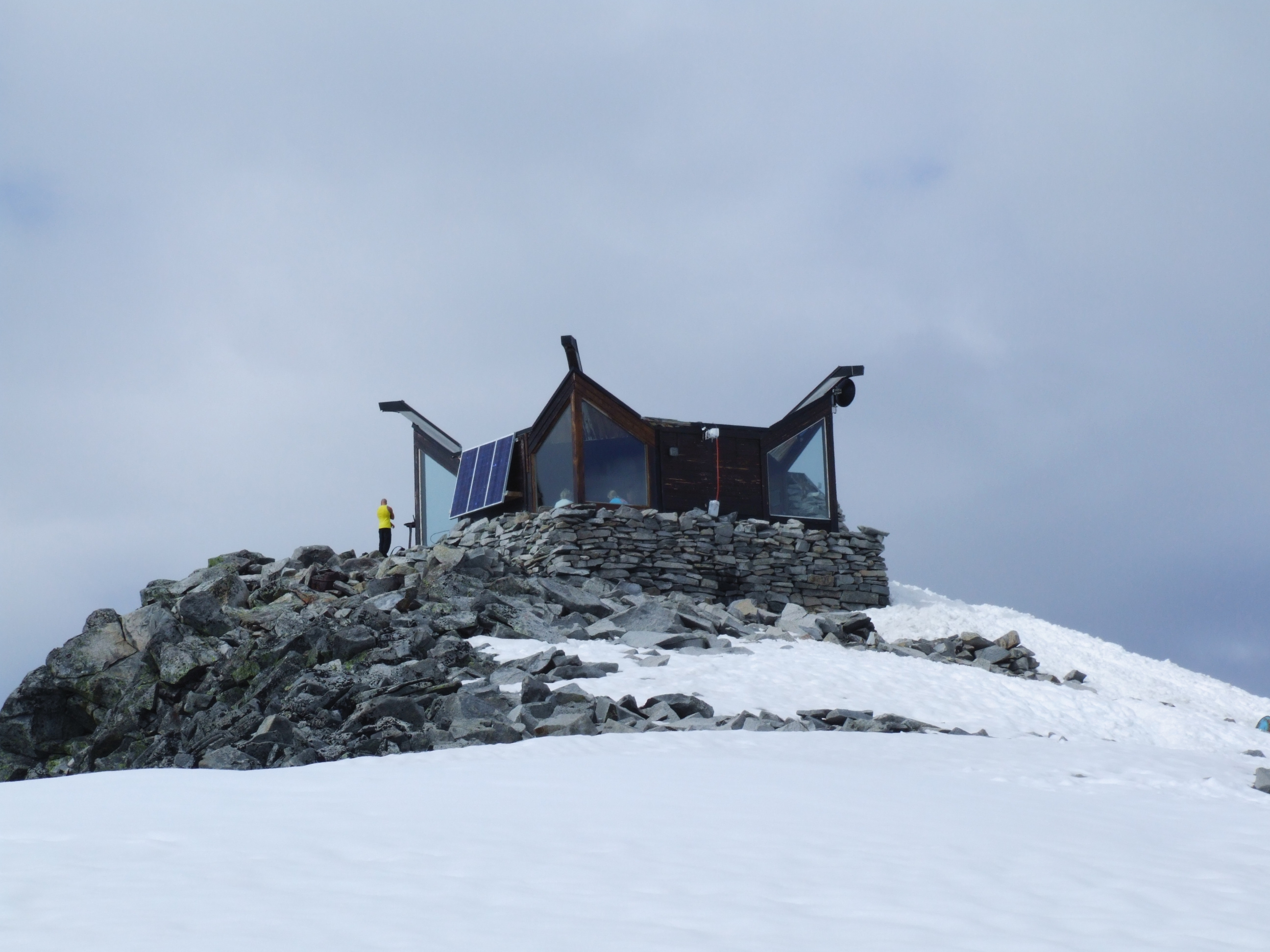
The cabin on top of Galdhøpiggen

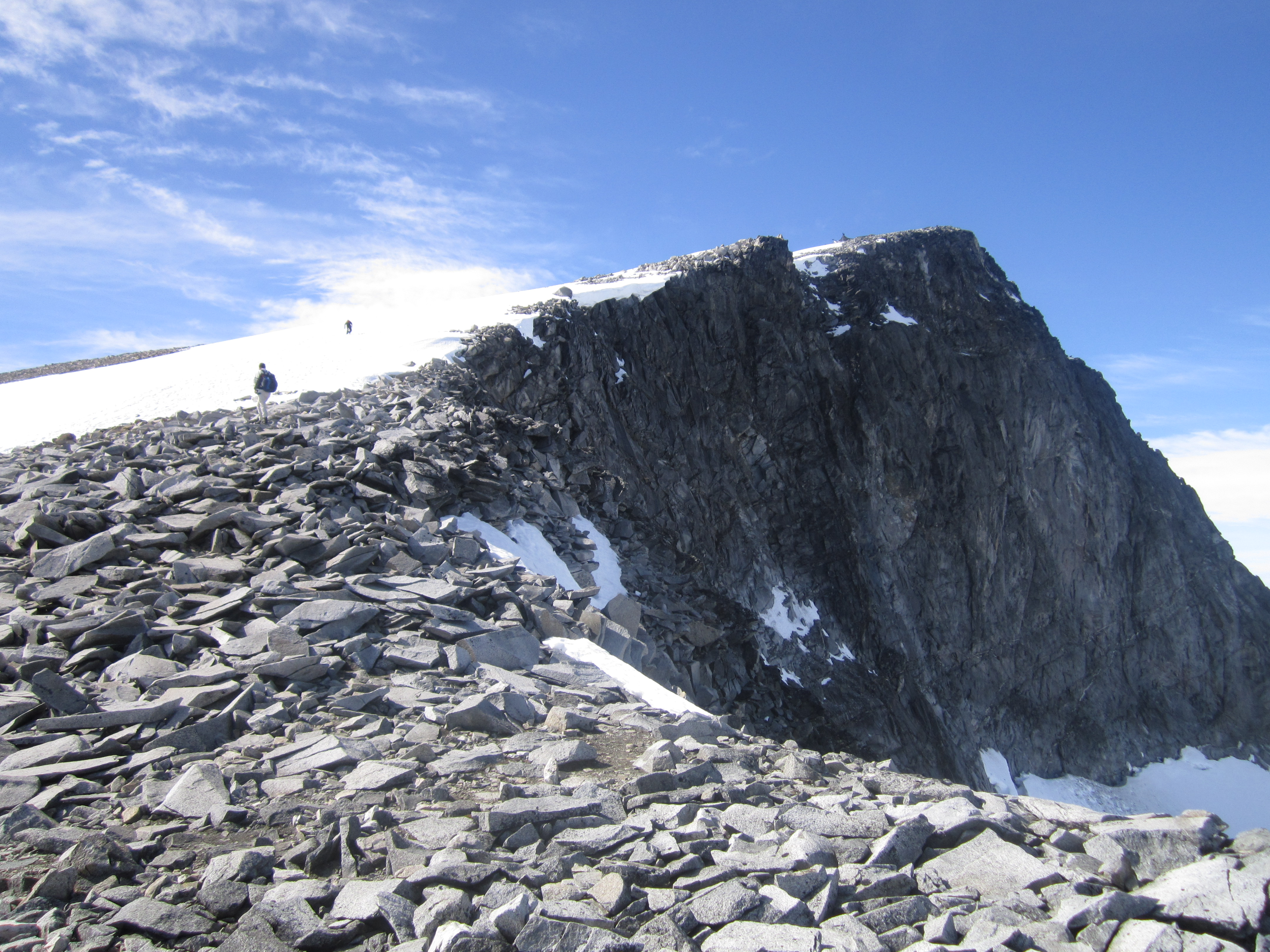
A close-up view of the mountain

Geologically, Galdhøpiggen belongs to the Caledonian folding, like most of South Norway's mountain ranges. The peak is made of gabbro, a hard but rather coarse-grained rock which is found in most of the Jotunheimen range. During the ice ages it was heavily glaciated and got its present form. The theory that the highest summits in Norway stayed above the ice as nunataks has been abandoned by most geologists. It fits well with the present flora in the area, but it does not fit well with the present knowledge of ice thickness and the results of glaciation.

For many years, geologists did not know that Galdhøpiggen was in fact the highest summit in Norway. That distinction was instead granted to Snøhetta in the Dovrefjell range, visible on the Oslo-Trondheim land route. Hence no attempts were made to climb the peak, while Snøhetta was visited for the first time in 1798 as part of a scientific trip to the area. In 1844 the geologist and mountaineer, Baltazar Mathias Keilhau, made two unsuccessful attempts to reach the summit. On one of these he reached a 2,355-metre (7,726 ft) tall summit, which was later named Keilhaus topp (very close to Galdhøpiggen), but the terrible weather forced him to return.

In 1850, three men from Lom reached the summit; the guide Steinar Sulheim, the local teacher Lars Arnesen and the church warden Ingebrigt Flotten.

== Access and modern tourism ==
There are two possible routes to reach the summit. One starts at Juvasshytta and the other at Spiterstulen. There are three summits on the route from Spiterstulen: Svellnose, Keilhaus topp and the summit itself. During the main season guided trips take one to the summit from Spiterstulen via the well known blue ice fall on Svellnosbreen.

The main season for hiking to Galdhøpiggen is between June and August. The season is determined by the melting and first appearance of snow, so it does not follow a set date. The peak is a common destination for backcountry skiers in the months of April and May.

At Juvasshytta there is an alpine ski resort with lift on a glacier, reaching an elevation of 2,200 metres (7,200 ft) above sea level, the highest in Scandinavia. It is called Galdhøpiggen Summer Ski Centre and is open from June and all the summer when the road is open.

== Summit ==
Galdhøpiggen had earlier been challenged for the title as the highest mountain in Norway by Glittertinden, as some measurements showed Glittertinden was slightly higher including the glacier at its peak.

This glacier has, however, shrunk in recent years, and Glittertinden is now only 2,464 metres (8,084 ft) even including the glacier. Hence, the dispute has been settled in Galdhøpiggen's favour.

At the summit a small cabin has been built. In the summer soft drinks, chocolate bars, postcards and other items are sold here. Earlier the Norwegian Postal Authority had a small post office here—being the highest in Northern Europe. Galdhøpiggen is not only the highest summit in Northern Europe, it also contains two probably unbreakable horticultural records in Northern Europe, being the upper limit for Ranunculus glacialis (2370 m) and Saxifraga oppositifolia (2350 m). Since the summer might not occur at all, some years, it tells something about these flowers' adaptation to the extremely harsh climate.

On sunny days in the later part of July and August, the summit is visited by hundreds of people.

== Media gallery ==
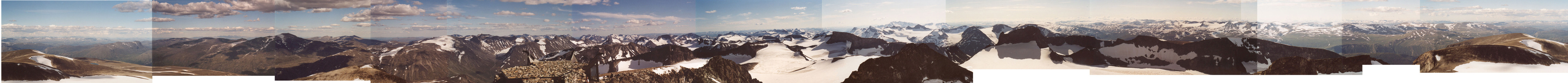
The view from the top (scroll left/right to see the view)
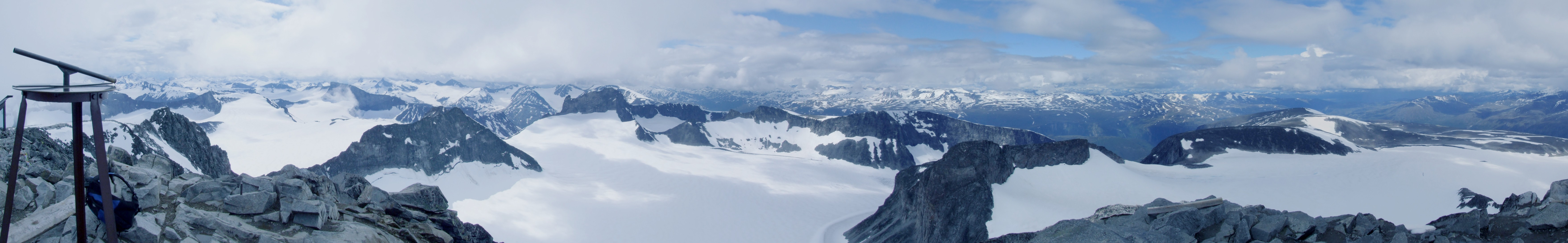
View from the top to west

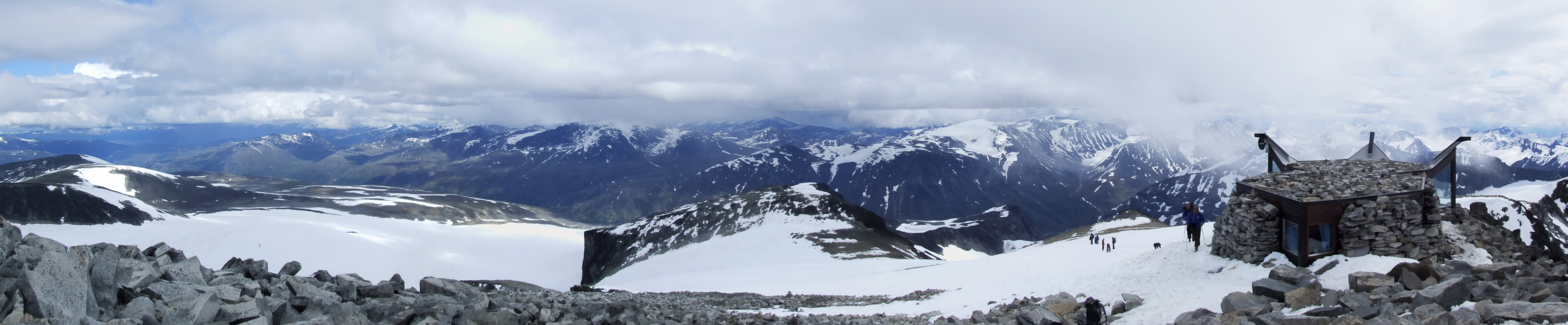
View from the top to east

== See also ==
- List of mountains in Norway by height
- Extreme points of Norway
- List of mountain peaks by prominence
- List of European ultra-prominent peaks
- Scandinavian mountain range
