= Øyrlandsodden =

Headland at Spitsbergen, Svalbard

Coordinates: 76.5673°N 16.2704°E

Øyrlandsodden is a headland in Sørkapp Land at Spitsbergen, Svalbard. It has a length of about 800 m (2,600 ft) and width of about 900 m (3,000 ft), located at the southern point of Øyrlandet.
