= Leirdalen =

Valley in Innlandet, Norway

- Leirdal
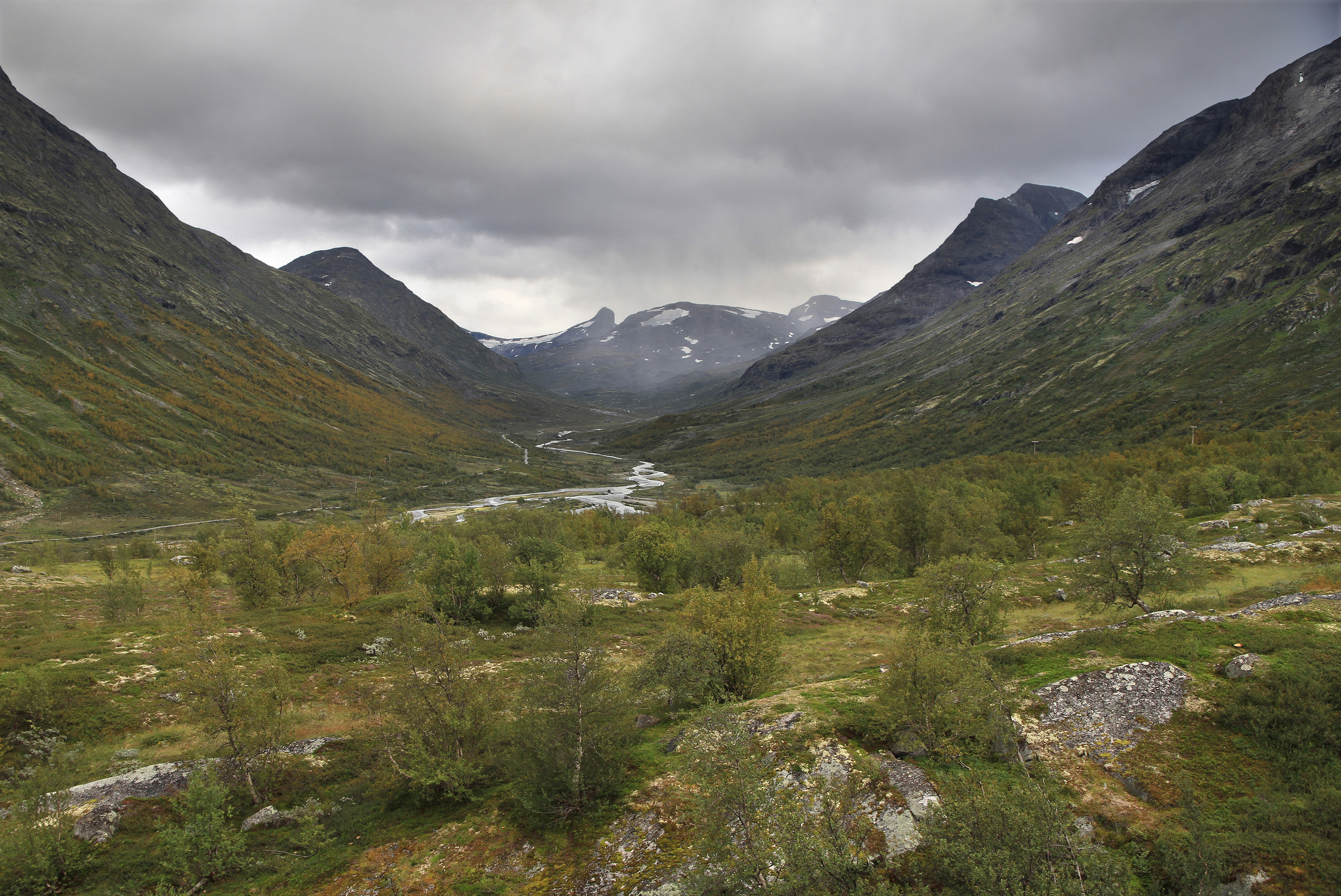
- View of the Leirdalen in Lom
- Length: 24 km (15 mi) SE-NW-NE

Geology
- Type: U-shaped valley

Geography
- Location: Innlandet, Norway
- Population centers: Elvesæter
- Coordinates: 61.69649°N 8.26689°E

Location
- Interactive map of the valley

Leirdalen is a U-shaped valley in Lom Municipality in Innlandet county, Norway. The 24-kilometre (15 mi) long valley lies on the south side of the larger Bøverdalen valley. The Leirdalen valley begins at the mountain Kyrkja, just north of the Høgvagltindene mountains and it then follows the river Leira to the northwest and then northeast to the village of Elvesæter where the valley ends and the river joins the river Bøvra and it becomes part of the Bøverdalen valley heading to the northeast. The valley goes into the Jotunheimen mountains and it lies just west of Galdhøpiggen, the tallest mountain in Norway.

There are two tourist cabins located in the valley. The Jotunheimen Fjellstue is located about half-way into the valley and Leirvassbu is located at the innermost part of the valley.
