= Leirvassbu =

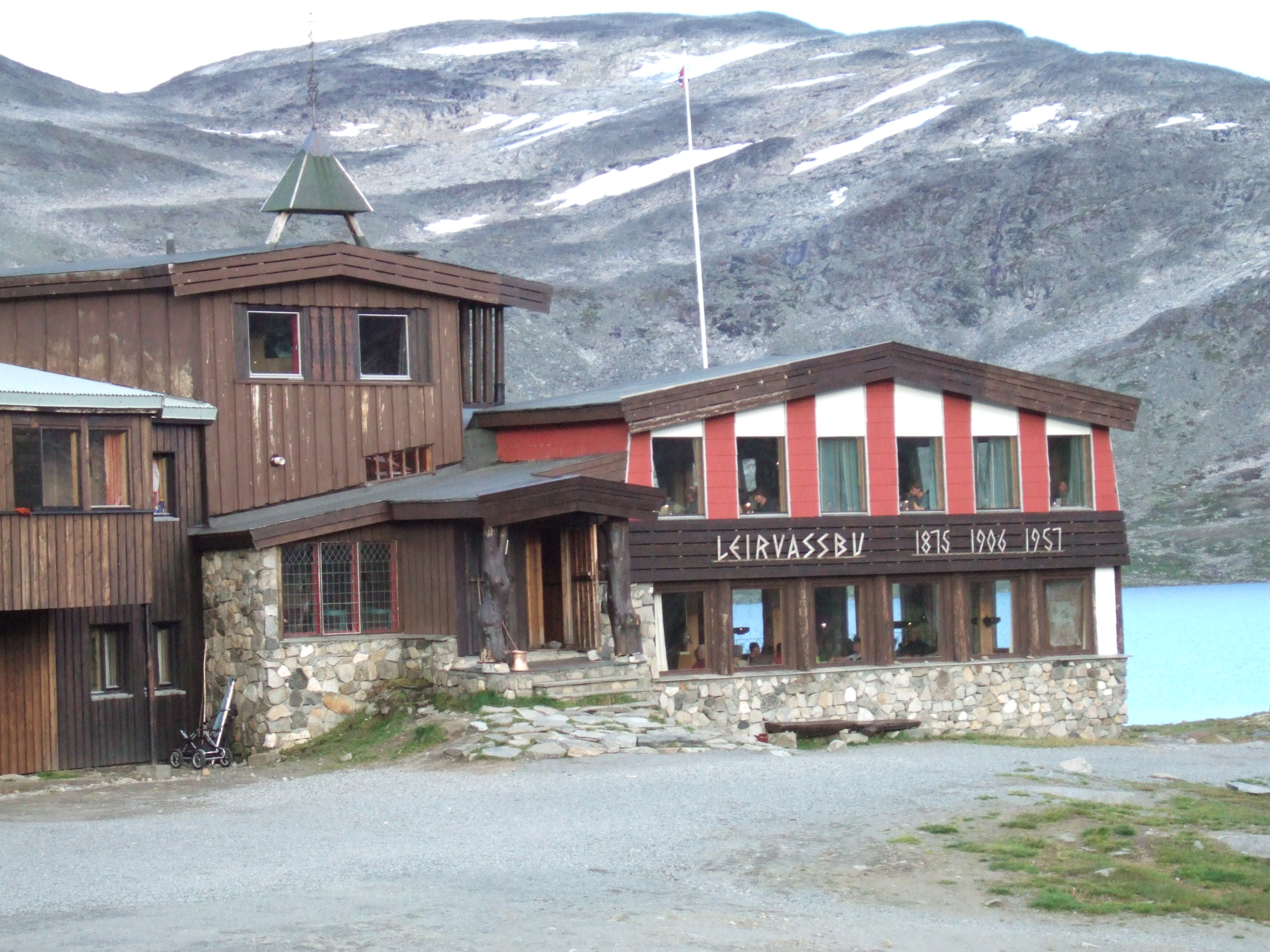
- Interactive map of the Leirvassbu area

General information
- Coordinates: 61°32′56″N 8°14′49″E
- Elevation: 1,400 m (4,600 ft)
- Owner: Norwegian Trekking Association

Website
- www.scandinavianmountains.com/areas/accommodation/leirvassbu-lodge.htm

Leirvassbu is a mountain lodge of the Norwegian Trekking Association (In Norwegian, Den Norske Turistforening – DNT) located in the Leirdal in the county Oppland in the middle of Norway. The lodge has a capacity of 205 beds.

The hut is located about 1400 meters above sea level in the high mountains Jotunheimen. Several walks are possible. It is located at the end of a side road off Norwegian County Road 55, the Sognefjellsvegen, just before Lake Bøvertunvatnet.

Surrounding places are Bøvertun, Krossbu and Elveseter.
