= Spiterstulen =

Mountain lodge in Oppland, Norway

Coordinates: 61°37′30″N 8°24′16″E

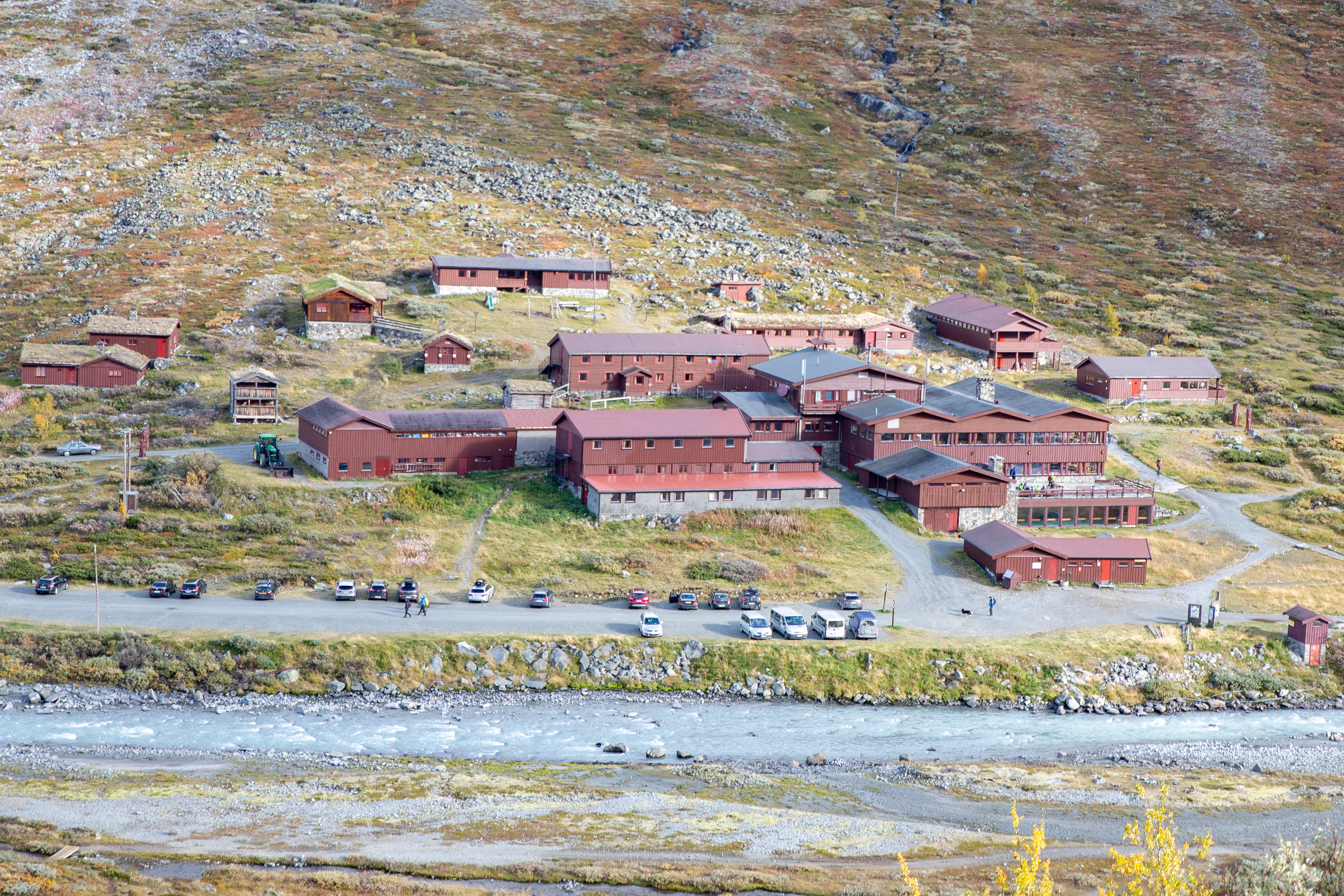
Spiterstulen

Spiterstulen is a former mountain farm, now a tourist station in the valley Visdalen in Lom Municipality in Innlandet county, Norway. Spiterstulen lies about 1,100 metres (3,600 ft) above sea level, between the two highest mountains in Norway, Galdhøpiggen and Glittertinden. It is the largest tourist cabin in Jotunheimen, with around 230 beds. It is reachable by car between March and October.

Spiterstulen was originally a cabin for shepherds. In 1836 it was extended for guests for the first time, since one of the paths used to cross the mountain was nearby (the Visdalen path reaches an elevation of 1,490 metres (4,890 ft), slightly higher than the present Norwegian County Road 55). In 1881, a proper tourist station was built, which has been extended several times.
