= Store Bukkeholstinden =

Mountain in Innlandet, Norway

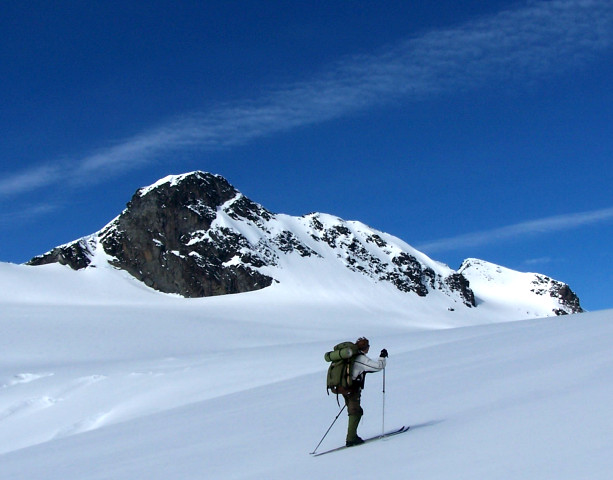
- The glacier Bukkeholsbreen in front

Highest point
- Elevation: 2,213 m (7,260 ft)
- Prominence: 153 m (502 ft)
- Parent peak: Bukkehøe
- Isolation: 2.1 km (1.3 mi)
- Coordinates: 61°34′45″N 8°18′28″E

Geography
- Interactive map of the mountain
- Location: Innlandet, Norway
- Parent range: Jotunheimen
- Topo map: 1518 II Galdhøpiggen

Climbing
- First ascent: 4 August 1887, Alexander Walnum and Lars Sulheim d.e.

Store Bukkeholstinden is a mountain in Lom Municipality in Innlandet county, Norway. The 2,213-metre (7,260 ft) tall mountain is located in the Jotunheimen mountains within Jotunheimen National Park. The mountain sits about 32 kilometres (20 mi) southwest of the village of Fossbergom and about 40 kilometres (25 mi) northeast of the village of Øvre Årdal. The mountain is surrounded by several other notable mountains including Bukkeholshøe to the east; Nørdre Hellstugutinden, Midtre Hellstugutinden, and Urdadalstindan to the southeast; Tverrbytthornet and Kyrkja to the south; the Tverrbottindene ridge to the southwest and west; Bukkehøe and Lindbergtinden to the northwest; and Store Styggehøe to the northeast.

This mountain is the highest among the mountains called Bukkeholstindane, and lies on a ridge between the Bukkeholsbreen glacier in the north and the Tverrbytnede valley in the south.

== See also ==
- List of mountains of Norway by height
