= Sørkappøya =

Island in Svalbard, Norway

Coordinates: 76°29.5′N 16°34′E

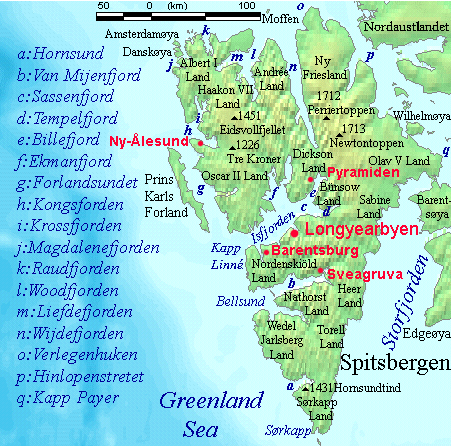
Sørkappøya is the small island south of Sørkapp, the southern tip of Spitsbergen.

Sørkappøya (English: South Cape Island) is an uninhabited 7 km long island of Greenland Sea at the southern tip of Spitsbergen, the largest island of the Svalbard archipelago. Five kilometers north of the island is Sørkapp (South Cape), the southern cape of Spitsbergen's main island.
