= Bøverdalen =

Valley in Innlandet, Norway

- Bøverdal
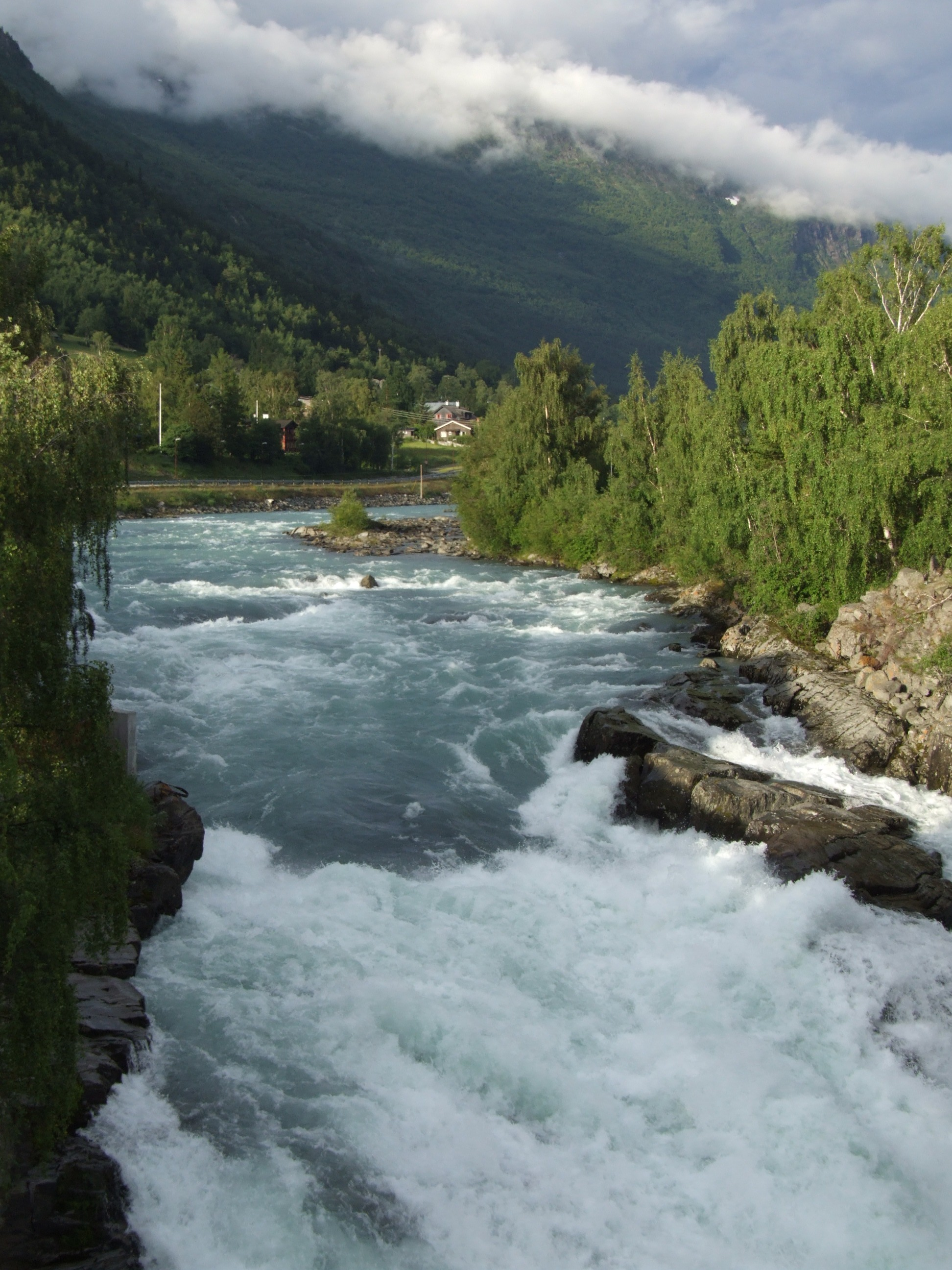
- River Bøvri in Lom
- Length: 50 km (31 mi) SW-NE

Geology
- Type: River valley

Geography
- Location: Innlandet, Norway
- Population centers: Fossbergom, Elvesæter
- Coordinates: 61.72707°N 8.34612°E
- River: Bøvra

Location
- Interactive map of the valley

Bøverdalen is a valley in Lom Municipality in Innlandet county, Norway. The 50-kilometre (31 mi) long valley lies on the south side of the main Ottadalen valley. The valley begins at the Bøverbrean glacier, just west of the Smørstabbtindene mountains and it then follows the river Bøvra to the northeast to the village of Fossbergom where the valley ends and the river joins the river Otta. The Leirdalen and Visdalen valleys are side valleys that lead to the Bøverdalen valley. The valley is the dividing line between the Breheimen mountains to the northwest and the Jotunheimen mountains to the southeast.

For many centuries a transportation route traversed this valley which connected Eastern Norway and Western Norway. It started at Fossbergom and then it followed the valley to the southwest before crossing the Sognefjellet mountains and then entering the Bergsdalen valley which leads into the Sogn region of Western Norway.

The 34-metre (112 ft) tall Saga Column (Norwegian: Sagasøyla), was erected in Bøverdalen in 1992. The history of the column is very convoluted. It started in 1926, when sculptor Wilhelm Rasmussen (1879–1965) won the competition for a column celebrating the Norwegian Constitution. The monument (Eidsvollsmonumentet) was originally intended to be placed by the Norwegian parliament in Oslo. The column shows the history of Norway from the time of the first king, Harald Fairhair in 872 to the first national assembly Riksforsamlingen at Eidsvoll in 1814.
