= Keilhaufjellet =

Mountain in Svalbard, Norway

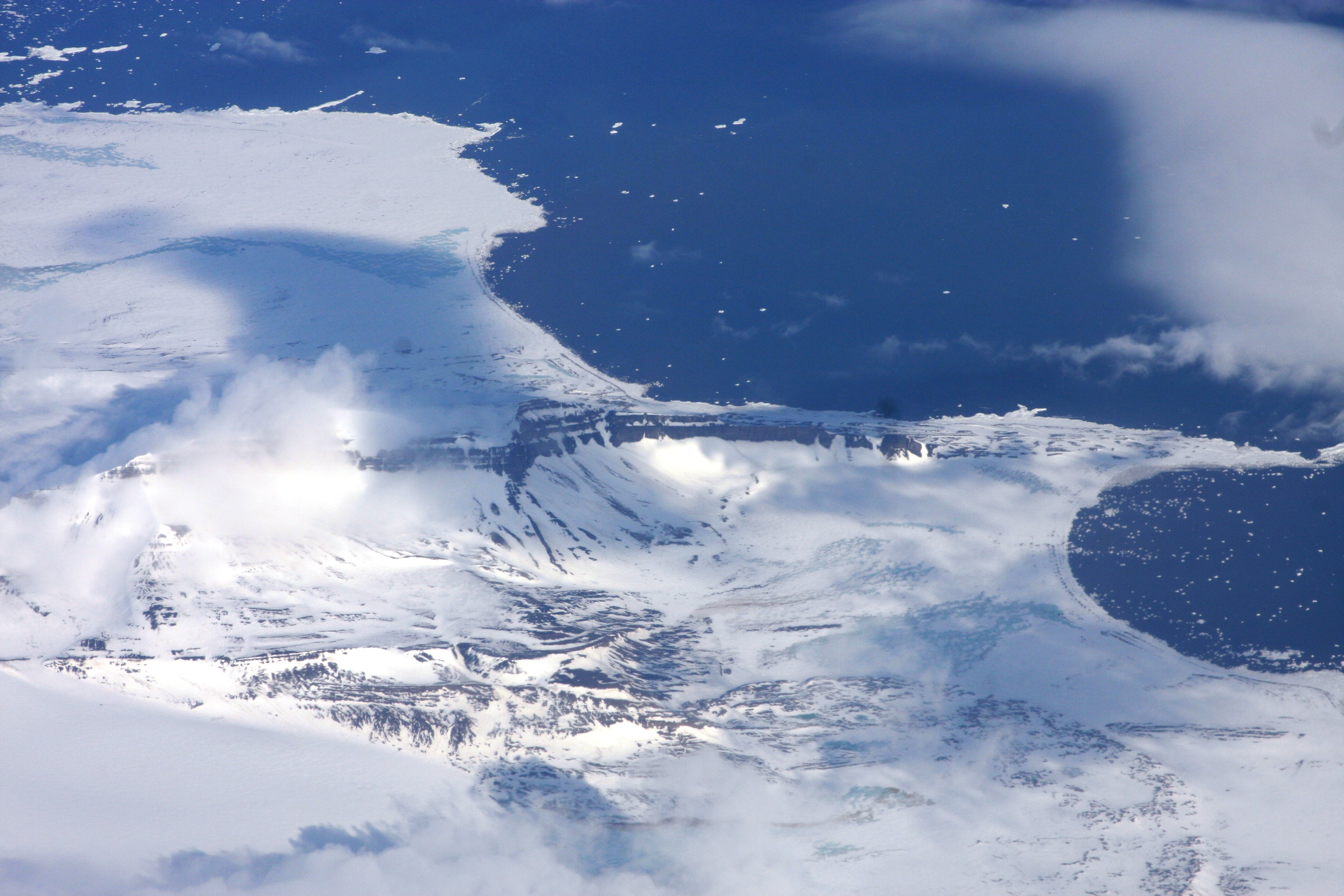

Highest point
- Elevation: 660 m (2,170 ft)
- Coordinates: 76.6285°N 16.9032°E

Geography
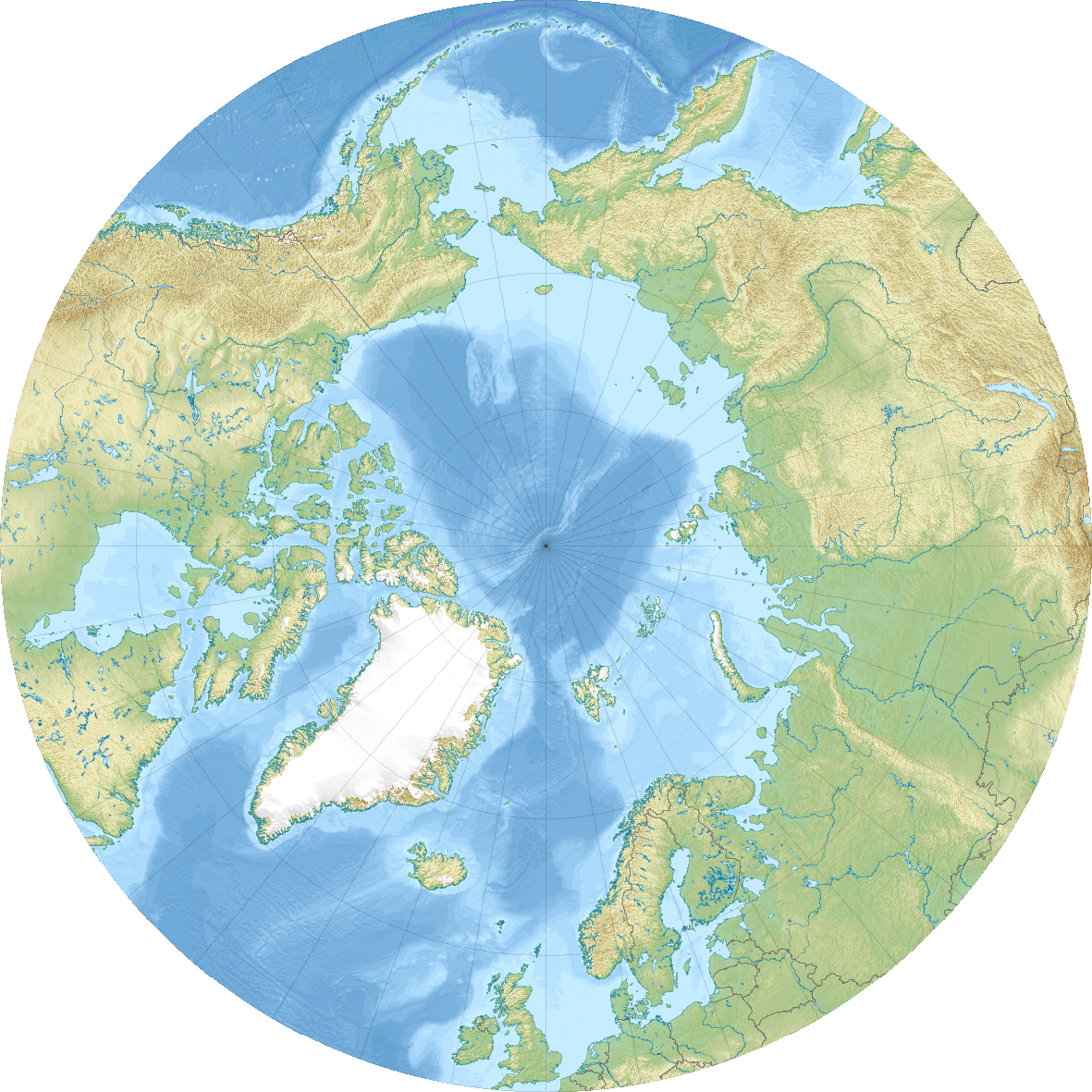
- Location within Arctic
- Location: Sørkapp Land at Spitsbergen, Svalbard, Norway

Climbing
- First ascent: 25 May 1900 by A. S. Wassiliew

Keilhaufjellet is a mountain in Sørkapp Land at Spitsbergen, Svalbard. It has a height of 660 m.a.s.l. The mountain is named after Norwegian geologist Baltazar Mathias Keilhau. Keilhaufjellet was the southernmost triangulation point established during the Swedish-Russian Arc-of-Meridian Expedition (from 1899).
