= Juvvasshøe =

Mountain in Innlandet, Norway

- Interactive map of the mountain

Highest point
- Elevation: 1,893 m (6,211 ft)
- Prominence: 52 m (171 ft)
- Parent peak: Galdhøpiggen
- Isolation: 0.869 km (0.540 mi)
- Coordinates: 61°40′39″N 8°22′07″E

Geography
- Location: Innlandet, Norway
- Parent range: Jotunheimen
- Topo map: 1518 II Galdhøpiggen

Juvvasshøe is a mountain in Lom Municipality in Innlandet county, Norway. The 1,893-metre (6,211 ft) tall mountain is located in the Jotunheimen mountains just outside the border of Jotunheimen National Park. The mountain sits about 20 kilometres (12 mi) southwest of the village of Fossbergom and about 50 kilometres (31 mi) northeast of the village of Øvre Årdal. The mountain is surrounded by several other notable mountains including Lauvhøe to the northeast, Glittertinden to the east, Galdhøe and Galdhøpiggen to the southwest, and Storhøe to the northwest.

== Climate and permafrost ==
The mean annual air temperature at Juvvasshøe is −4.1 °C (24.6 °F). This value is extrapolated from a larger number of official Norwegian weather stations. According to the experience in other alpine and polar regions this temperature indicates that permafrost must be widespread and probably extends to a depth of several hundred meters. Within the EU-sponsored project PACE (Permafrost and Climate in Europe), a 129-metre (423 ft) deep vertical borehole in bedrock was drilled in August 1999 on Juvvasshøe at an altitude of 1,893 metres (6,211 ft) above sea level. The stable ground temperature at a depth of 100 metres (330 ft) is still −2.6 °C (27.3 °F). The measured geothermal gradient in the drillhole of 1.19 °C (34.14 °F) per 100 metres (330 ft) allows a calculation of a permafrost thickness of 320 metres (1,050 ft), a proof that widespread permafrost occurrences must exist in the Jotunheimen area at these altitudes.

Juvvasshøe is surrounded by several other notable mountains of Jotunheimen including Glittertinden to the east, Galdhøe and Galdhøpiggen to the southwest. They are even several hundred meters higher. The expected mean annual air temperature at these highest peaks is in the order of −7 °C (19 °F), a value characteristic for areas with continuous permafrost and a considerable permafrost thickness. For many Scandinavian scientists, this was surprising and not accepted until the fifth International Conference on Permafrost (ICOP) in 1988 in Trondheim followed by field excursions in Norway and Sweden with international periglacial experts. However, the first permafrost findings date back to the 1970s and early 1980s when thick permafrost occurrences were proved with geophysical soundings.

== See also ==
- List of mountains of Norway by height
