= Galdhøe =

Mountain in Innlandet, Norway

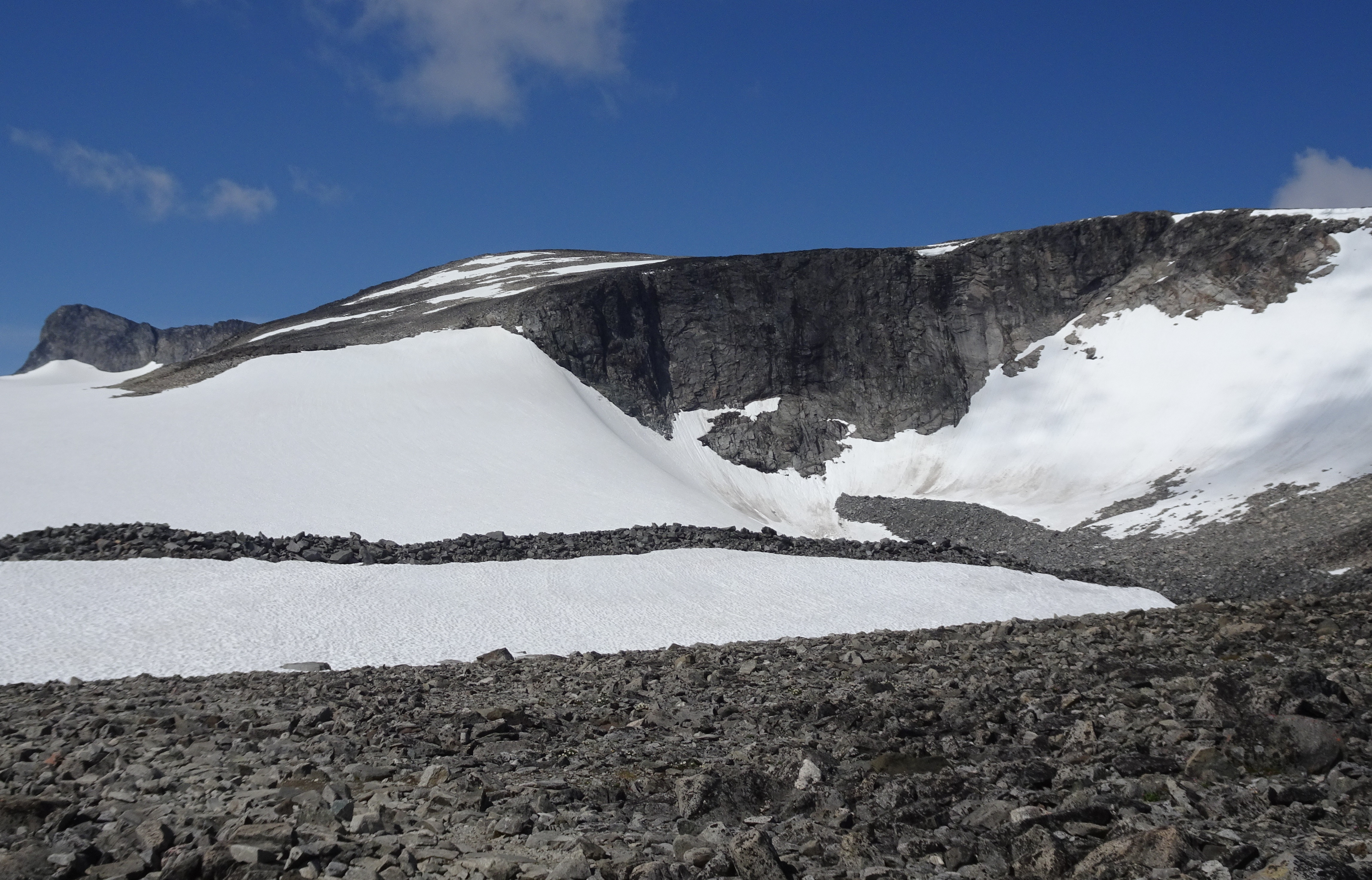

Highest point
- Elevation: 2,282 m (7,487 ft)
- Prominence: 102 m (335 ft)
- Parent peak: Galdhøpiggen
- Isolation: 0.783 km (0.487 mi)
- Coordinates: 61°39′22″N 8°19′41″E

Geography
- Interactive map of the mountain
- Location: Innlandet, Norway
- Parent range: Jotunheimen
- Topo map: 1518 II Galdhøpiggen

Galdhøe is a mountain in Lom Municipality in Innlandet county, Norway. The 2,282-metre (7,487 ft) tall mountain is located in the Jotunheimen mountains within Jotunheimen National Park. The mountain sits about 23 kilometres (14 mi) southeast of the village of Fossbergom and about 48 kilometres (30 mi) northeast of the village of Øvre Årdal. The mountain is surrounded by several other notable mountains including Juvvasshøe and Lauvhøe to the northeast, Glittertinden to the east, Galdhøpiggen to the southwest, and Storhøe to the northwest.

== See also ==
- List of mountains of Norway by height
