= Veobreatinden =

Mountain in Innlandet, Norway

- Veobretinden (unofficial)
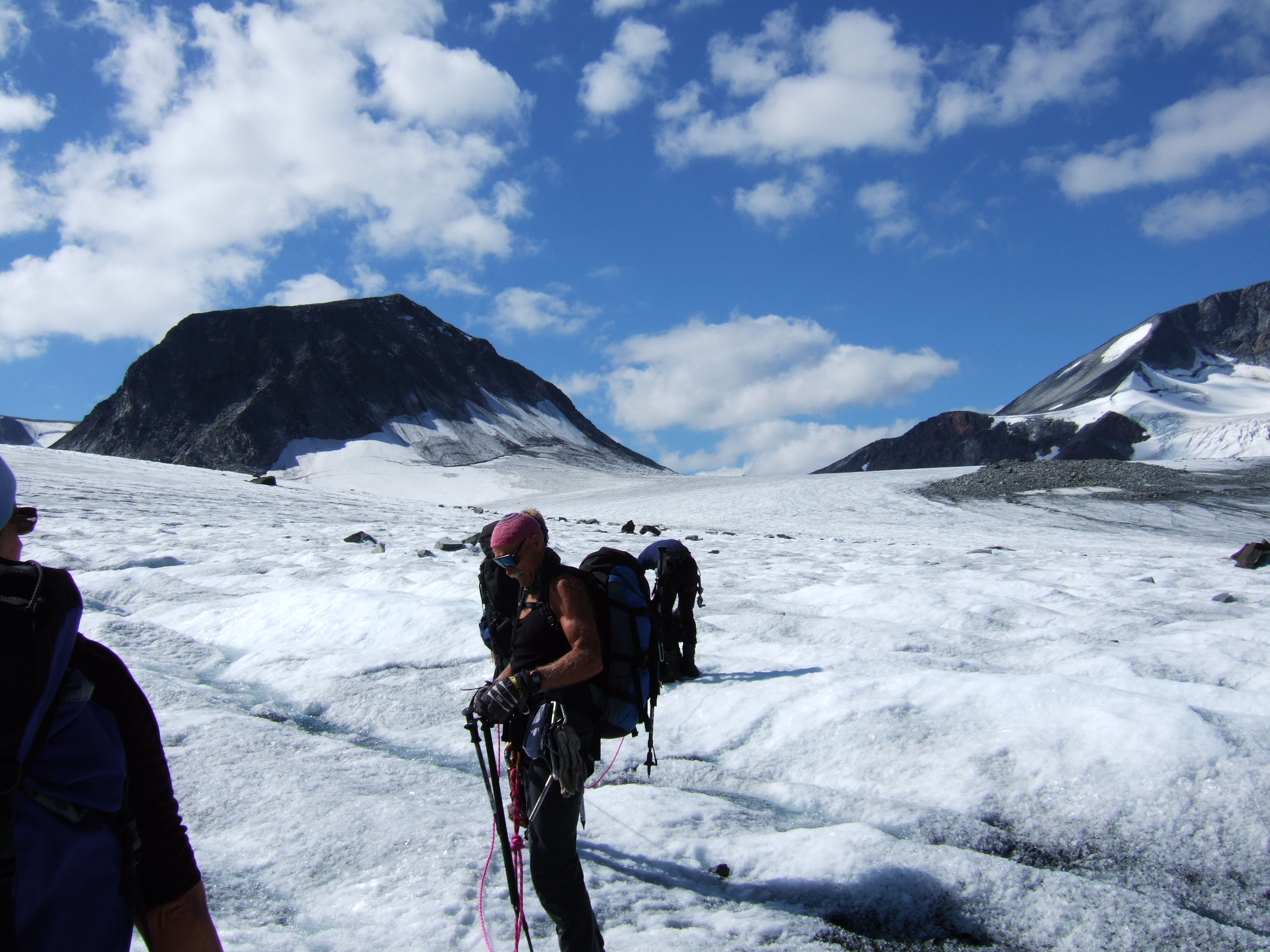

Highest point
- Elevation: 2,183 m (7,162 ft)
- Prominence: 103 m (338 ft)
- Parent peak: Store Memurutinden
- Isolation: 0.782 km (0.486 mi)
- Coordinates: 61°34′48″N 8°29′26″E

Geography
- Interactive map of the mountain
- Location: Innlandet, Norway
- Parent range: Jotunheimen
- Topo map: 1618 III Glittertinden

Veobreatinden is a mountain in Lom Municipality in Innlandet county, Norway. The 2,183-metre (7,162 ft) tall mountain is located in the Jotunheimen mountains within Jotunheimen National Park. The mountain sits about 30 kilometres (19 mi) south of the village of Fossbergom and about 45 kilometres (28 mi) southwest of the village of Vågåmo. The mountain is surrounded by several other notable mountains including Spiterhøe, Skauthøe, Leirhøi, and Veobreahesten to the northwest; Steinbukampen and Veopallan to the northeast; Veotinden to the east; Austre Memurutinden and Blåbreahøe to the southeast; Store Memurutinden to the south; and Nørdre Hellstugutinden, Midtre Hellstugutinden, Store Hellstugutinden, and Nestsøre Hellstugutinden to the southwest.

== See also ==
- List of mountains of Norway by height
