= Raudhamran =

Mountain in Innlandet, Norway

- Interactive map of the mountain

Highest point
- Elevation: 1,895 m (6,217 ft)
- Prominence: 115 m (377 ft)
- Parent peak: Surtningssue
- Isolation: 0.941 km (0.585 mi)
- Coordinates: 61°30′43″N 8°33′26″E

Geography
- Location: Innlandet, Norway
- Parent range: Jotunheimen
- Topo map: 1618 III Glittertinden

Raudhamran is a mountain in Lom Municipality in Innlandet county, Norway. The 1,895-metre (6,217 ft) tall mountain is located in the Jotunheimen mountains within Jotunheimen National Park. The mountain sits about 37 kilometres (23 mi) south of the village of Fossbergom and about 50 kilometres (31 mi) southwest of the village of Vågåmo. The mountain is surrounded by several other notable mountains including Surtningssue to the northeast; Blåbreahøe to the north; Memurutindene to the northwest; Reinstinden, Hinnotefjellet, and Storådalshøe to the west; and Knutsholstinden to the south.

== See also ==
- List of mountains of Norway by height
