= Midtre Hellstugutinden =

Mountain in Innlandet, Norway

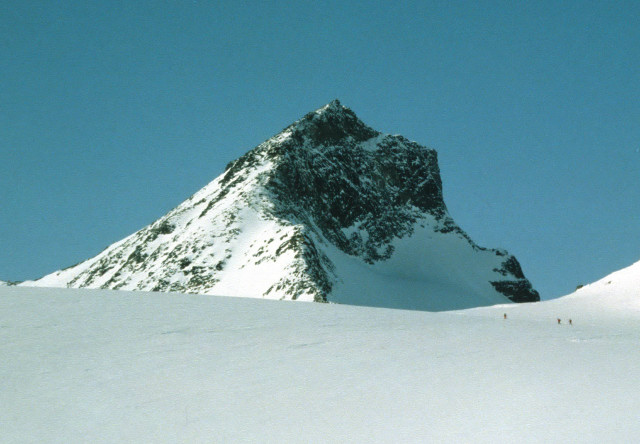
- View of the mountain, seen from Hellstugubreen

Highest point
- Elevation: 2,339 m (7,674 ft)
- Prominence: 160 m (520 ft)
- Parent peak: Store Hellstugutinden
- Isolation: 0.821 km (0.510 mi)
- Listing: #13 in Norway
- Coordinates: 61°33′06″N 8°25′30″E

Geography
- Interactive map of the mountain
- Location: Innlandet, Norway
- Parent range: Jotunheimen
- Topo map: 1518 II Galdhøpiggen

Climbing
- First ascent: 19 August 1886 (Edvard Alexander Westermarck, Lars Sulheim d.e.)

Midtre Hellstugutinden is a mountain in Lom Municipality in Innlandet county, Norway. The 2,339-metre (7,674 ft) tall mountain is located in the Jotunheimen mountains within Jotunheimen National Park. It is the second highest mountain on the Hellstugutindane ridge, and it lies just north of Store Hellstugutinden. The mountain sits about 42 kilometres (26 mi) northeast of the village of Øvre Årdal and about 52 kilometres (32 mi) southwest of the village of Vågåmo. The mountain is surrounded by several other notable mountains including Blåbreahøe and Surtningssue to the east; Reinstinden and Hinnotefjellet to the southeast; Store Hellstugutinden, Nestsøre Hellstugutinden, and Søre Hellstugutinden to the south; Urdadalstindene to the west; Nørdre Hellstugutinden to the north; and Veobreahesten, Leirhøe, Veobreatinden, Store Memurutinden, and Austre Memurutinden to the northeast.

== Name ==
The first element is the name of the Hellstugu cabin which was built as a shelter for hunters. The last element is the finite form of tind which means 'mountain peak'. The name of the cabin is a compound of hella which means 'flat stone' or 'flagstone' and stugu which means 'house with one room' or 'cabin'. Most houses in Norway are mostly made of wood, but here they had to use stone because the lack of wood. The first word in the name is midtre which means 'middle'.

== See also ==
- List of mountains of Norway by height
