= Spiterhøe =

Mountain in Innlandet, Norway

- Spiterhøi (unofficial)
- Interactive map of the mountain

Highest point
- Elevation: 2,033 m (6,670 ft)
- Prominence: 139 m (456 ft)
- Parent peak: Surtningssue
- Isolation: 1.1 km (0.68 mi) to Leirhøe
- Coordinates: 61°36′46″N 8°26′19″E

Geography
- Location: Innlandet, Norway
- Parent range: Jotunheimen
- Topo map: 1518 II Galdhøpiggen

Spiterhøe is a mountain in Lom Municipality in Innlandet county, Norway. The 2,033-metre (6,670 ft) tall mountain is located in the Jotunheimen mountains within Jotunheimen National Park. The mountain sits about 25 kilometres (16 mi) south of the village of Fossbergom and about 45 kilometres (28 mi) southwest of the village of Vågåmo. The mountain is surrounded by several other notable mountains including Skauthøe to the north; Glittertinden and Steinbukampen to the northeast; Veopallan to the east; Leirhøi, Veobreatinden, and Veobreahesten to the southeast; Nørdre Hellstugutinden to the south; and Galdhøpiggen to the west.

== See also ==
- List of mountains of Norway by height
