= Semeltinden =

Mountain in Innlandet, Norway

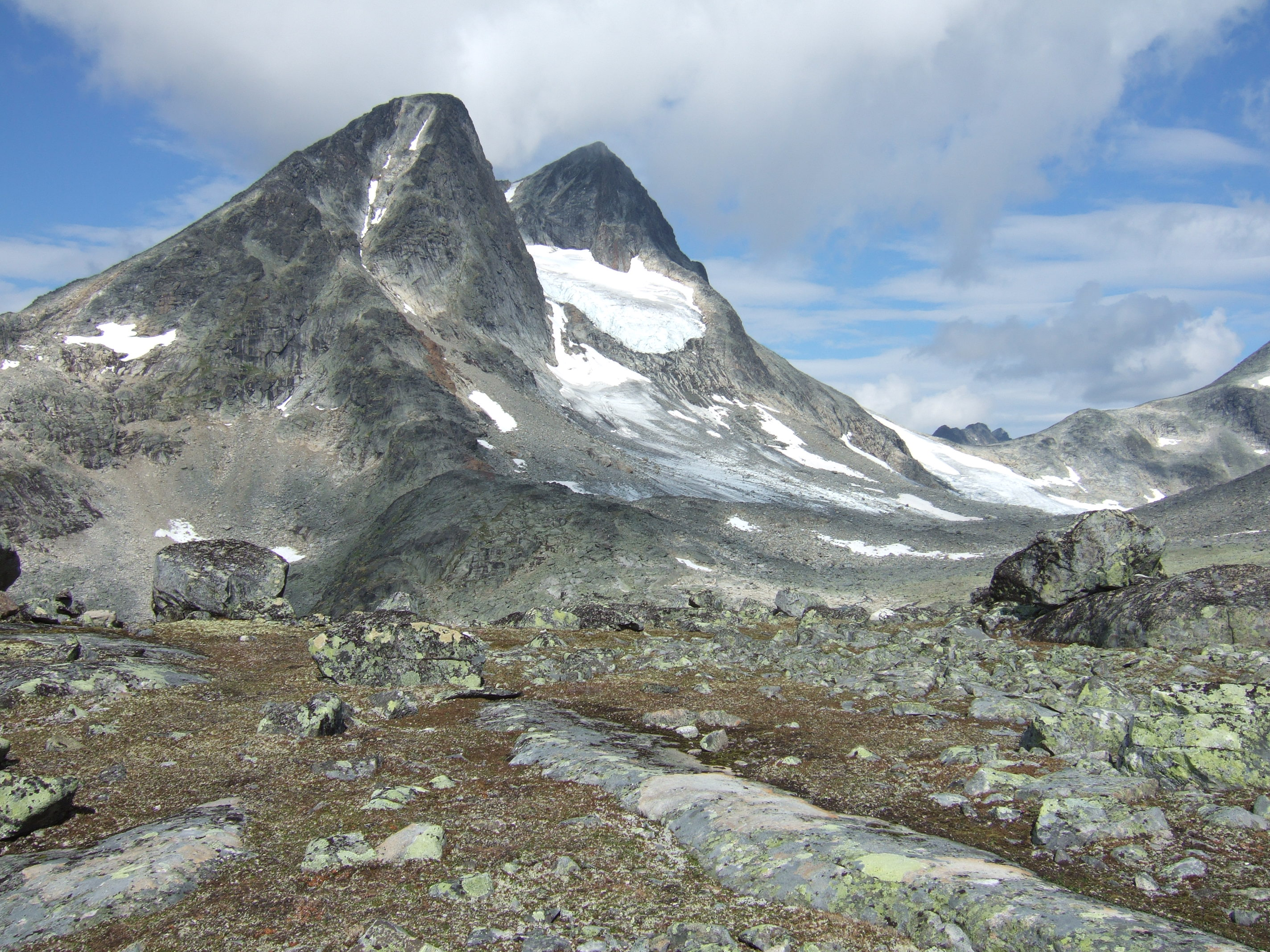

Highest point
- Elevation: 2,237 m (7,339 ft)
- Prominence: 438 m (1,437 ft)
- Parent peak: Surtingssue
- Isolation: 2.9 km (1.8 mi) to Nestsøre Hellstugutinden
- Coordinates: 61°30′48″N 8°24′24″E

Geography
- Interactive map of the mountain
- Location: Innlandet, Norway
- Parent range: Jotunheimen
- Topo map: 1518 II Galdhøpiggen

Semeltinden is a mountain in Lom Municipality in Innlandet county, Norway. The 2,237-metre (7,339 ft) tall mountain is located in the Jotunheimen mountains within Jotunheimen National Park. The mountain sits about 37 kilometres (23 mi) southeast of the village of Fossbergom and about 38 kilometres (24 mi) northeast of the village of Øvre Årdal. The mountain is surrounded by several other notable mountains including Hinnotefjellet and Reinstinden to the east; Storådalshøe and Høgtunga to the southeast; Skarddalseggje and Store Rauddalseggje to the southwest; Høgvagltindane to the west; Visbreatinden, Semelholstinden, Langvasshøe, and Urdadalstindan to the northwest; and Søre Hellstugutinden, Nestsøre Hellstugutinden, and Store Hellstugutinden to the northeast.

== See also ==
- List of mountains of Norway by height
