= Nørdre Hellstugutinden =

Mountain in Innlandet, Norway

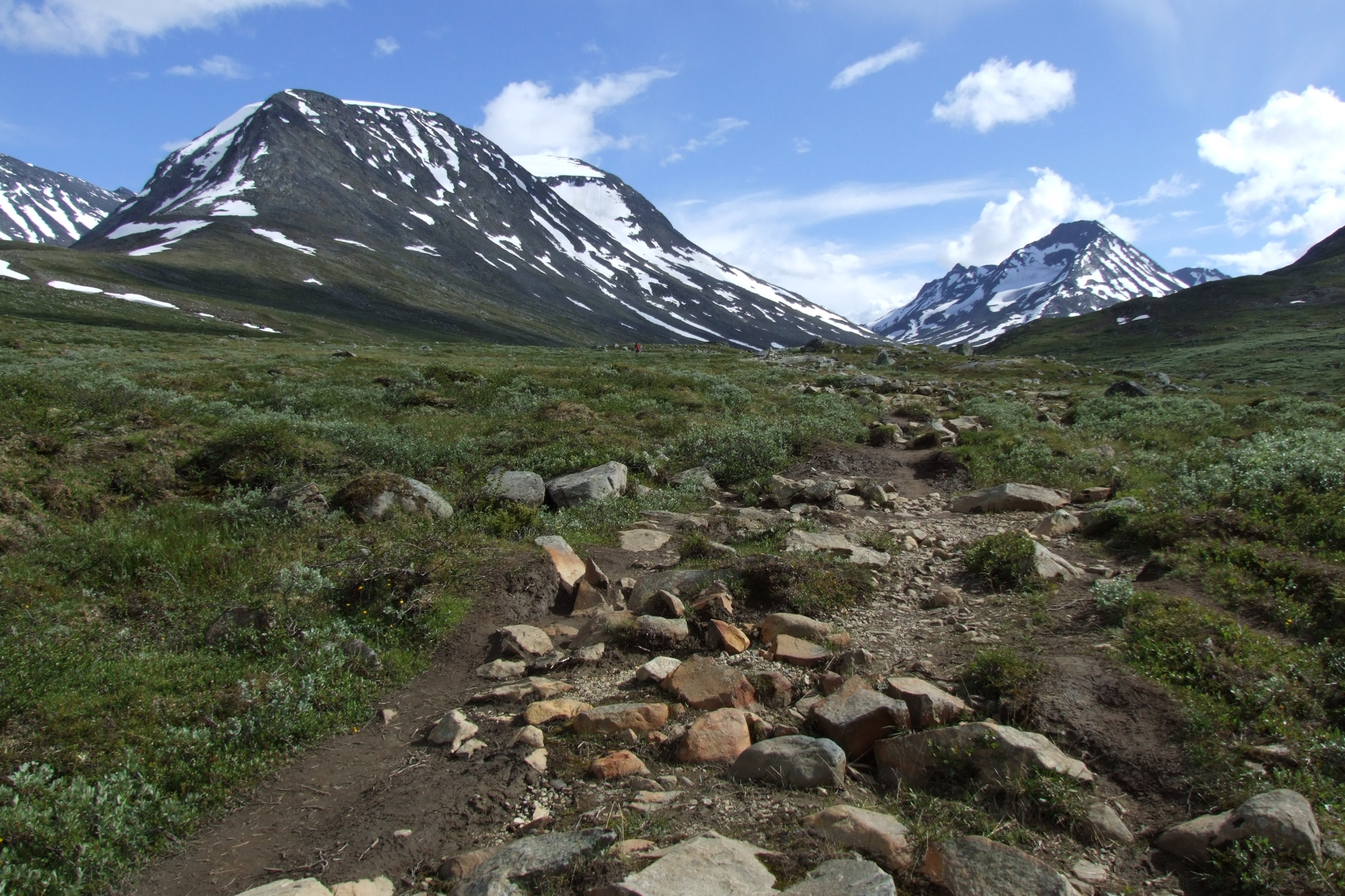
- View of the mountains from left: Hellstuguhøe (2,072 m), Nørdre Hellstugutinden (2,218 m), Urdadalstinden (2,116 m)

Highest point
- Elevation: 2,218 m (7,277 ft)
- Prominence: 93 m (305 ft)
- Parent peak: Store Hellstugutinden
- Isolation: 1.2 km (0.75 mi)
- Coordinates: 61°33′43″N 8°25′14″E

Geography
- Interactive map of the mountain
- Location: Innlandet, Norway
- Parent range: Jotunheimen
- Topo map: 1518 II Galdhøpiggen

Nørdre Hellstugutinden is a mountain in Lom Municipality in Innlandet county, Norway. The 2,218-metre (7,277 ft) tall mountain is located in the Jotunheimen mountains within Jotunheimen National Park. The mountain sits about 42 kilometres (26 mi) northeast of the village of Øvre Årdal and about 50 kilometres (31 mi) southwest of the village of Vågåmo. The mountain is surrounded by several other notable mountains including Blåbreahøe and Surtningssue to the southeast; Midtre Hellstugutinden, Store Hellstugutinden, Nestsøre Hellstugutinden, and Søre Hellstugutinden to the south; Urdadalstindene to the southwest; Hellstuguhøi to the north; Veobreahesten, Leirhøe, Veobreatinden to the northeast; and Store Memurutinden and Austre Memurutinden to the east.

== Name ==
The first element is the name of the Hellstugu cabin which was built as a shelter for hunters. The last element is the finite form of tind which means 'mountain peak'. The name of the cabin is a compound of hella which means 'flat stone' or 'flagstone' and stugu which means 'house with one room' or 'cabin'. Most houses in Norway are mostly made of wood, but here they had to use stone because the lack of wood. The first word in the name is nordre which means 'northern' since it is on the northern end of the mountain ridge.

== See also ==
- List of mountains of Norway by height
