= Austre Memurutinden =

Mountain in Innlandet, Norway

- Interactive map of the mountain

Highest point
- Elevation: 2,301 m (7,549 ft)
- Prominence: 178 m (584 ft)
- Parent peak: Store Memurutinden
- Isolation: 0.852 km (0.529 mi)
- Coordinates: 61°33′56″N 8°30′27″E

Geography
- Location: Innlandet, Norway
- Parent range: Jotunheimen

Austre Memurutinden is a mountain in Lom Municipality in Innlandet county, Norway. The 2,301-metre (7,549 ft) tall mountain is located in the Jotunheimen mountains within Jotunheimen National Park. It is the 21st tallest peak in Norway.

The mountain is situated approximately 30 kilometres (19 mi) southeast of the village of Fossbergom and about 46 kilometres (29 mi) southwest of the village of Vågåmo. The mountain is surrounded by several other notable mountains including Veotinden and Styggehøbretindan to the northeast; Blåbreahøe and Surtningssue to the southeast; Reinstinden to the south; Hinnotefjellet, Søre Hellstugutinden, Nestsøre Hellstugutinden, and Store Hellstugutinden to the southwest; Midtre Hellstugutinden, Nørdre Hellstugutinden, and Store Memurutinden to the west; and Veobreatinden, Veobreahesten, and Leirhøe to the northeast.

== See also ==
- List of mountains of Norway by height
