= Skauthøe =

Mountain in Innlandet, Norway

- Skauthøi (unofficial)
- Interactive map of the mountain

Highest point
- Elevation: 1,993 m (6,539 ft)
- Prominence: 73 m (240 ft)
- Parent peak: Spiterhøe
- Isolation: 0.929 km (0.577 mi)
- Coordinates: 61°37′31″N 8°26′53″E

Geography
- Location: Innlandet, Norway
- Parent range: Jotunheimen
- Topo map: 1518 II Galdhøpiggen

Skauthøe is a mountain in Lom Municipality in Innlandet county, Norway. The 1,993-metre (6,539 ft) tall mountain is located in the Jotunheimen mountains within Jotunheimen National Park. The mountain sits about 25 kilometres (16 mi) south of the village of Fossbergom and about 45 kilometres (28 mi) southwest of the village of Vågåmo. The mountain is surrounded by several other notable mountains including Glittertinden to the northeast; Steinbukampen to the east; Veopallan and Veotinden to the southeast; Spiterhøe, Leirhøi, and Veobreahesten to the south; and Galdhøpiggen to the west.

== See also ==
- List of mountains of Norway by height
