= Reinstinden (Lom) =

Mountain in Innlandet, Norway

- Interactive map of the mountain

Highest point
- Elevation: 1,756 m (5,761 ft)
- Prominence: 64 m (210 ft)
- Parent peak: Surtningssue
- Isolation: 1.1 km (0.68 mi)
- Coordinates: 61°31′01″N 8°29′47″E

Geography
- Location: Innlandet, Norway
- Parent range: Jotunheimen
- Topo map: 1518 II Galdhøpiggen

Reinstinden is a mountain in Lom Municipality in Innlandet county, Norway. The 1,756-metre (5,761 ft) tall mountain is located in the Jotunheimen mountains within Jotunheimen National Park. The mountain sits about 43 kilometres (27 mi) northeast of the village of Øvre Årdal and about 50 kilometres (31 mi) southwest of the village of Vågåmo. The mountain is surrounded by several other notable mountains including Høgtunga to the south; Storådalshøe to the southwest; Hinnotefjellet, Semeltinden, and Søre Hellstugutinden to the west; Nestsøre Hellstugutinden, Store Hellstugutinden, and Nørdre Hellstugutinden to the northwest; Store Memurutinden and Austre Memurutinden to the north; Blåbreahøe to the northeast; and Surtningssue and Raudhamran to the east.

== See also ==
- List of mountains of Norway by height
