= Leirhøe =

Mountain in Innlandet, Norway

- Leirhøi (unofficial)
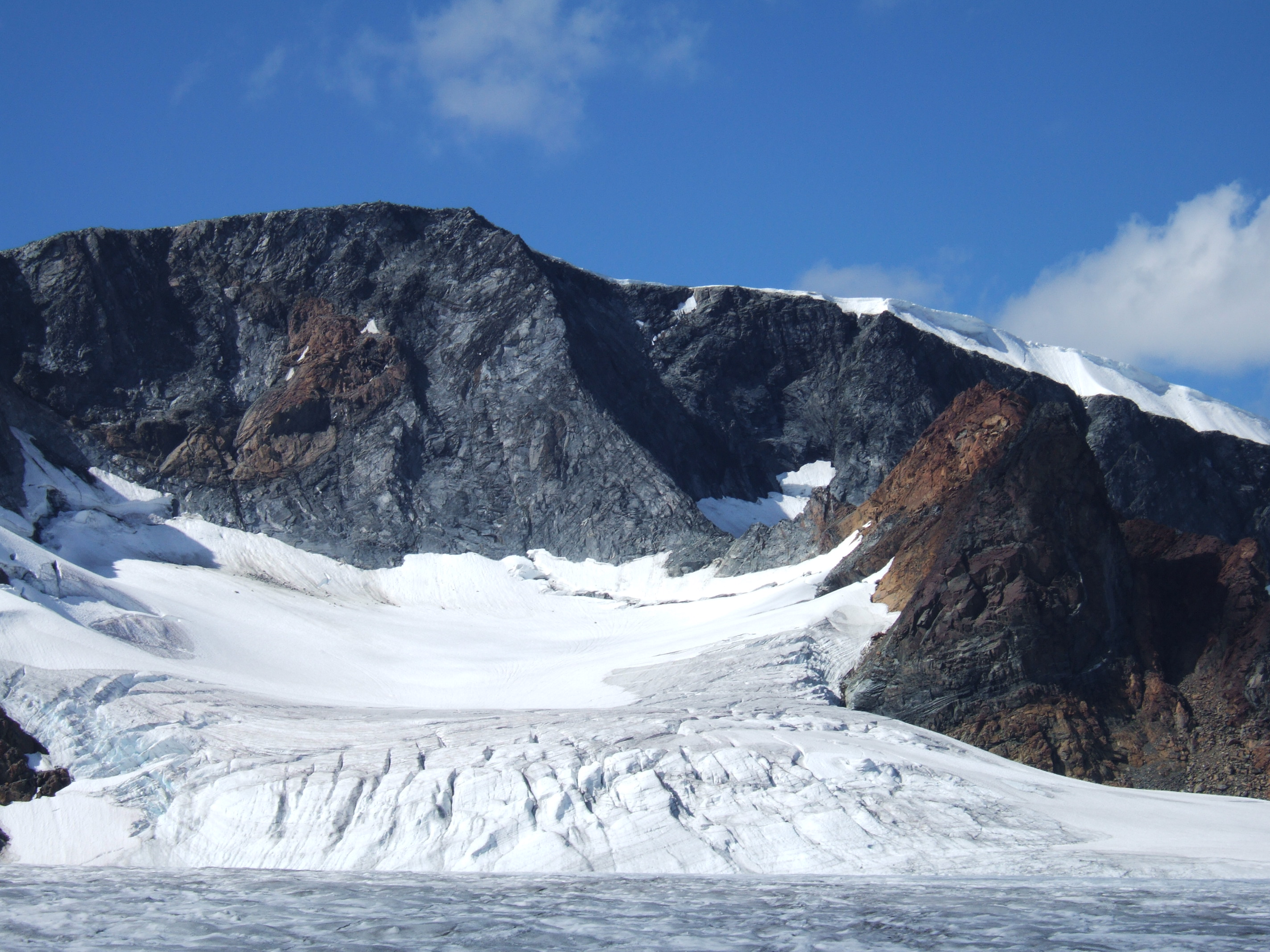

Highest point
- Elevation: 2,334 m (7,657 ft)
- Prominence: 294 m (965 ft)
- Parent peak: Store Memurutinden
- Isolation: 2.7 km (1.7 mi)
- Listing: #16 at Norway
- Coordinates: 61°35′28″N 8°28′03″E

Geography
- Interactive map of the mountain
- Location: Innlandet, Norway
- Parent range: Jotunheimen
- Topo map: 1518 II Galdhøpiggen

Leirhøe is a mountain in Lom Municipality in Innlandet county, Norway. The 2,334-metre (7,657 ft) tall mountain is located in the Jotunheimen mountains within Jotunheimen National Park. The mountain sits about 28 kilometres (17 mi) south of the village of Fossbergom and about 47 kilometres (29 mi) southwest of the village of Vågåmo. The mountain is surrounded by several other notable mountains including Spiterhøe and Skauthøe to the northwest; Veobreahesten and Veopallan to the northeast; Veotinden and Veobreatinden to the southeast; Store Memurutinden to the south; and Nørdre Hellstugutinden, Midtre Hellstugutinden, Store Hellstugutinden, and Nestsøre Hellstugutinden to the southwest.

== Name ==
The mountain is named after the lake Leirtjønne or the brook Leirgrove. The last element is the finite form of hø which means '(large) round mountain'. The name of the lake is a compound of leir which means 'clay', and the finite form of tjønn which means 'tarn' or 'small lake'. The last element in the name of the river is the finite form of grov which means 'brook'.

== See also ==
- List of mountains of Norway by height
