= Veobrean =

Glacier in Innlandet, Norway

- Veobreen (historic)
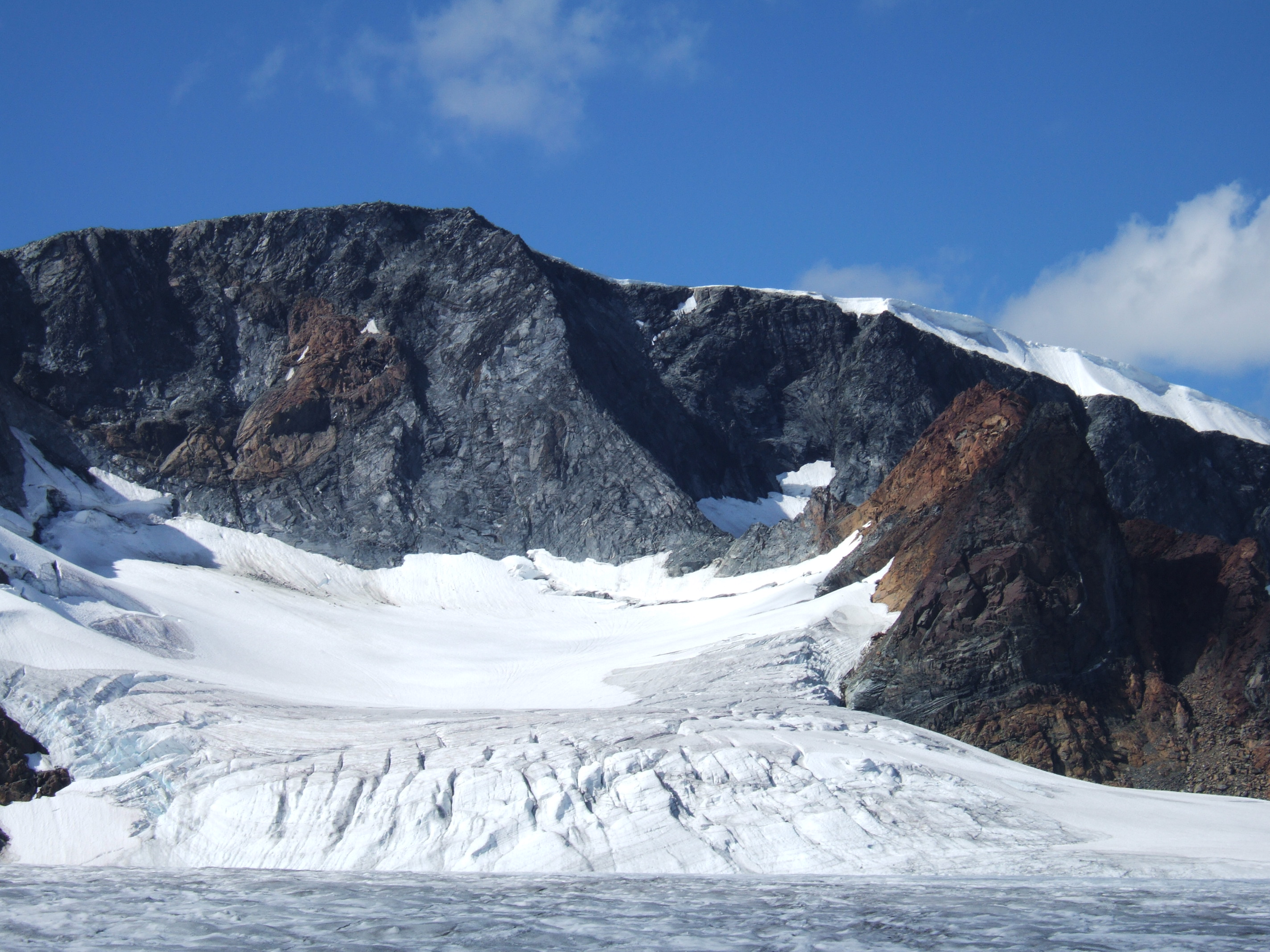
- View of the mountain Leirhøi and the Veobreen glacier
- Interactive map of the glacier
- Location: Innlandet, Norway
- Coordinates: 61.58436°N 8.50005°E
- Area: 9 km^{2} (3.5 sq mi)

Veobrean is a glacier in Lom Municipality and Vågå Municipality in Innlandet county, Norway. The 9-square-kilometre (3.5 sq mi) glacier is located within the Jotunheimen National Park. The glacier is located on the west side of the mountain Veotinden, north of the mountain Store Memurutinden, east of Veobreahesten, Veobretinden, and Leirhøi, and south of Veopallan.

== See also ==
- List of glaciers in Norway
