= Storådalshøe =

Mountain in Innlandet, Norway

- Storådalshøi (unofficial)
- Interactive map of the mountain

Highest point
- Elevation: 1,884 m (6,181 ft)
- Prominence: 263 m (863 ft)
- Parent peak: Glittertinden
- Isolation: 2.3 km (1.4 mi) to Hinnotefjellet
- Coordinates: 61°29′16″N 8°27′10″E

Geography
- Location: Innlandet, Norway
- Parent range: Jotunheimen
- Topo map: 1518 II Galdhøpiggen

Storådalshøe is a mountain in Lom Municipality in Innlandet county, Norway. The 1,884-metre (6,181 ft) tall mountain is located in the Jotunheimen mountains within Jotunheimen National Park. The mountain sits about 41 kilometres (25 mi) northeast of the village of Øvre Årdal and about 54 kilometres (34 mi) southwest of the village of Vågåmo. The mountain is surrounded by several other notable mountains including Reinstinden and Raudhamran to the northeast, Høgtunga to the southeast, Semeltinden and Søre Hellstugutinden to the northwest, and Hinnotefjellet to the north.

== See also ==
- List of mountains of Norway by height
