= Urdadalstindan =

Mountain ridge in Innlandet, Norway

- Urdadalstindene (unofficial)
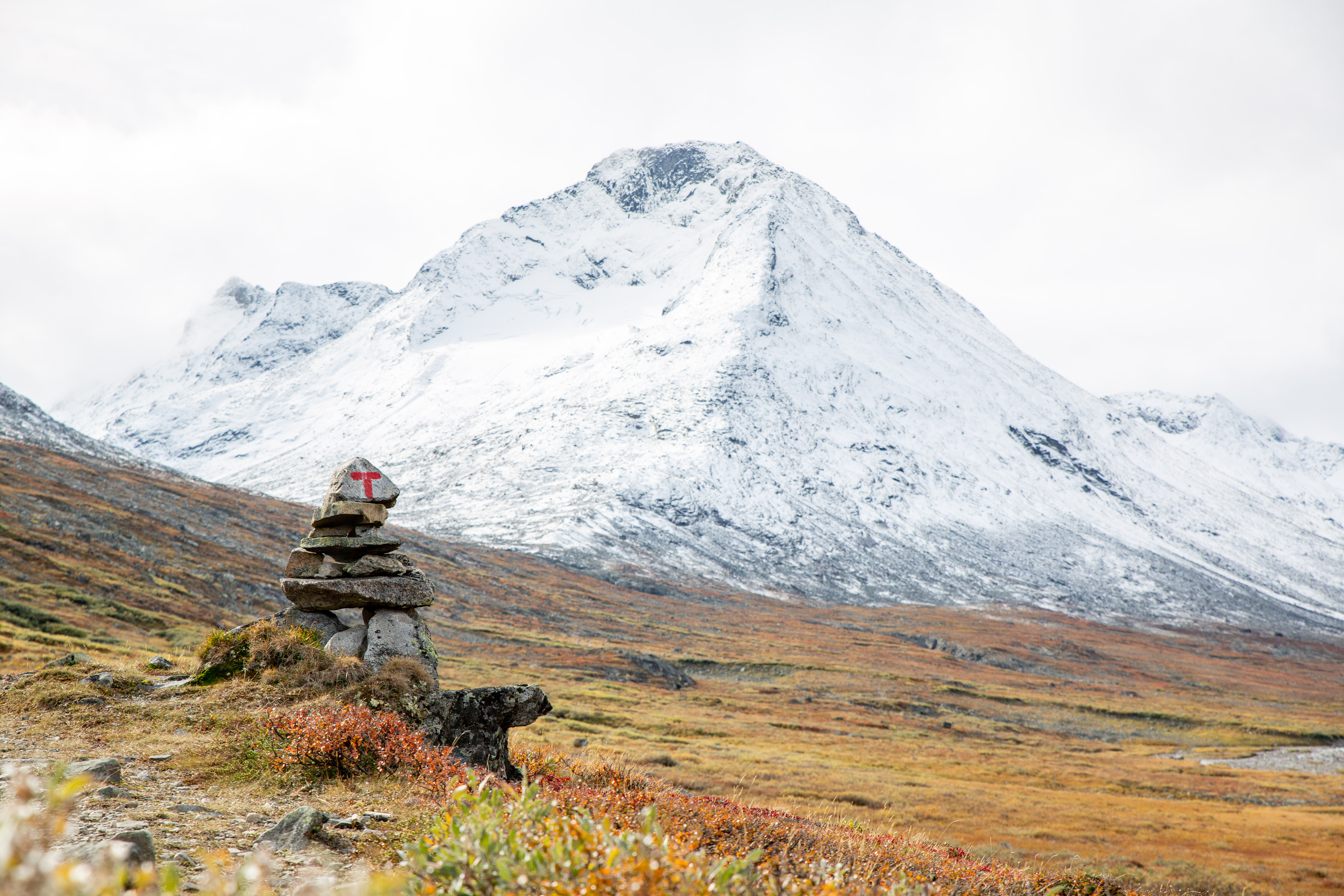
- Store Urdadalstinden in Autumn as seen from the path from Spiterstulen

Highest point
- Elevation: 2,116 m (6,942 ft)
- Prominence: 264 m (866 ft)
- Parent peak: Visbreatinden
- Isolation: 2.1 km (1.3 mi)
- Coordinates: 61°33′06″N 8°22′39″E

Geography
- Interactive map of the mountain
- Location: Innlandet, Norway
- Parent range: Jotunheimen
- Topo map: 1518 II Galdhøpiggen

Urdadalstindan is a mountain ridge in Lom Municipality in Innlandet county, Norway. The highest peak is the northernmost peak, the 2,116-metre (6,942 ft) tall Store Urdadalstinden. The other peaks include Midtre Urdadalstinden, Søre Urdadalstinden, and Sørevestre Urdadalstinden. The mountains are located south of the Visdalen valley in the Jotunheimen mountains within Jotunheimen National Park. The ridge sits about 41 kilometres (25 mi) northeast of the village of Skjolden and about 35 kilometres (22 mi) south of the village of Fossbergom. The mountains are surrounded by several other notable mountains including Nørdre Hellstugutinden, Midtre Hellstugutinden, Store Hellstugutinden, Nestsøre Hellstugutinden, and Søre Hellstugutinden to the east; Semeltinden to the southwest; and Langvasshøe, Visbreatinden, and Semelholstinden to the west.

== See also ==
- List of mountains of Norway by height
