= Søre Blåbreahøe =

Mountain in Innlandet, Norway

- Interactive map of the mountain

Highest point
- Elevation: 2,196 m (7,205 ft)
- Prominence: 65 m (213 ft)
- Parent peak: Surtningssue
- Isolation: 0.615 km (0.382 mi)
- Coordinates: 61°32′37″N 8°33′23″E

Geography
- Location: Innlandet, Norway
- Parent range: Jotunheimen

Søre Blåbreahøe is a mountain on the border of Vågå Municipality and Lom Municipality in Innlandet county, Norway. The 2,196-metre (7,205 ft) tall mountain is located in the Jotunheimen mountains within Jotunheimen National Park. The mountain sits about 33 kilometres (21 mi) south of the village of Fossbergom and about 45 kilometres (28 mi) southwest of the village of Vågåmo. The mountain is surrounded by several other notable mountains including Veotinden and Styggehøbretindan to the north; Surtningssuoksle to the east; Surtningssue and Gloptinden to the southeast; Reinstinden, Raudhamran, and Hinnotefjellet to the southwest; Store Hellstugutinden, Nestsøre Hellstugutinden, and Søre Hellstugutinden to the west; and Austre Memurutinden and Store Memurutinden to the northwest.

== See also ==
- List of mountains of Norway by height
