= Høgtunga (Lom) =

Mountain in Innlandet, Norway

- Interactive map of the mountain

Highest point
- Elevation: 1,634 m (5,361 ft)
- Prominence: 33 m (108 ft)
- Parent peak: Memurutunga
- Isolation: 0.545 km (0.339 mi)
- Coordinates: 61°28′50″N 8°28′53″E

Geography
- Location: Innlandet, Norway
- Parent range: Jotunheimen

Høgtunga is a mountain in Lom Municipality in Innlandet county, Norway. The 1,634-metre (5,361 ft) tall mountain is located in the Jotunheimen mountains within Jotunheimen National Park. The mountain sits about 40 kilometres (25 mi) northeast of the village of Øvre Årdal and about 33 kilometres (21 mi) southwest of the village of Beitostølen. The mountain is surrounded by several other notable mountains including Reinstinden to the north; Surtningssue to the northeast; Tjønnholstinden and Knutsholstinden to the southeast; Store Rauddalseggje to the west; and Storådalshøe, Hinnotefjellet, Nestsøre Hellstugutinden, and Søre Hellstugutinden to the northwest.

== See also ==
- List of mountains of Norway by height
