= Store Memurutinden =

Mountain in Innlandet, Norway

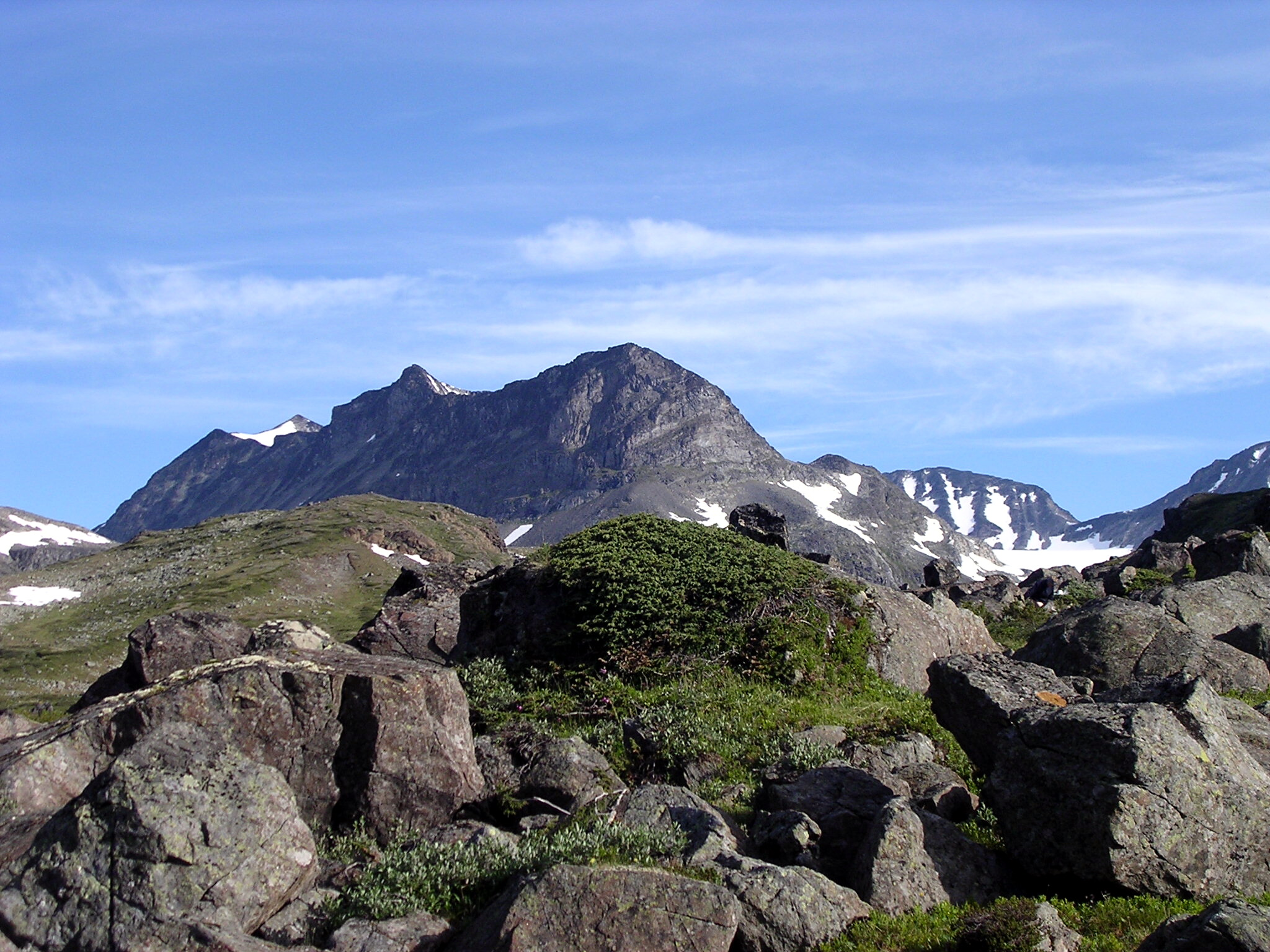
- Memurutinden, seen from Memurudalen valley

Highest point
- Elevation: 2,367 m (7,766 ft)
- Prominence: 335 m (1,099 ft)
- Parent peak: Surtningssue
- Isolation: 5.8 km (3.6 mi)
- Listing: #8 in Norway
- Coordinates: 61°34′02″N 8°28′39″E

Geography
- Interactive map of the mountain
- Location: Innlandet, Norway
- Parent range: Jotunheimen
- Topo map: 1618 III Glittertinden

Store Memurutinden is the eighth-highest mountain in Norway. It is in Lom Municipality in Innlandet county, Norway. The 2,367-metre (7,766 ft) tall mountain is located on the Memurutindene mountains within Jotunheimen National Park. The mountain sits about 30 kilometres (19 mi) south of the village of Fossbergom and about 50 kilometres (31 mi) southwest of the village of Vågåmo. The mountain is surrounded by several other notable mountains including Leirhøi, Veobreahesten, and Veobreatinden to the north; Veotinden to the northeast; Austre Memurutinden to the east; Blåbreahøe and Surtningssue to the southeast; Reinstinden to the south; Søre Hellstugutinden, Nestsøre Hellstugutinden, Store Hellstugutinden, and Midtre Hellstugutinden to the southwest; and Nordre Hellstugutinden to the west.

== Name ==
The first element is the old name of the river Memuru (now called the Muru). The last element is the finite form of tind which means 'mountain peak'. The river name is derived from the verb mara which means 'dig' - the first element Me- is from Old Norse mið meaning 'in the middle', because the mouth of the river is almost exactly at the middle of the lake Gjendin. The first word store means 'the big'.

== See also ==
- List of mountains of Norway by height
