= Styggehøbretindan =

Mountain in Innlandet, Norway

Styggehøbretindan Styggehøbreatinden
- Interactive map of the mountain

Highest point
- Elevation: 2,232 m (7,323 ft)
- Prominence: 93 m (305 ft)
- Parent peak: Søre Veotinden
- Isolation: 1.2 km (0.75 mi)
- Coordinates: 61°34′38″N 8°32′43″E

Geography
- Location: Innlandet, Norway
- Parent range: Jotunheimen
- Topo map: 1618 III Glittertinden

Styggehøbretindan or Styggehøbreatinden is a mountain in Vågå Municipality in Innlandet county, Norway. The 2,232-metre (7,323 ft) tall mountain is located in the Jotunheimen mountains within Jotunheimen National Park. The mountain sits about 45 kilometres (28 mi) southwest of the village of Vågåmo and about 40 kilometres (25 mi) northwest of the village of Beitostølen. The mountain is surrounded by several other notable mountains including Veotinden to the northwest, Styggehøi to the northeast, Gloptinden to the southeast, Surtningssue and Blåbreahøe to the south, and Austre Memurutinden to the west.

The mountain has two peaks which are located on the north and south sides of the Styggehøbrean glacier. The highest peak is Søraustre Styggehøbreatinden in the south which reaches 2,232 metres (7,323 ft) above sea level. The northern peak is Nørdre Styggehøbreatinden which reaches an elevation of 2,167 metres (7,110 ft).

== See also ==
- List of mountains of Norway by height
