= Veobreahesten =

Mountain in Innlandet, Norway

- Veobrehesten (unofficial)
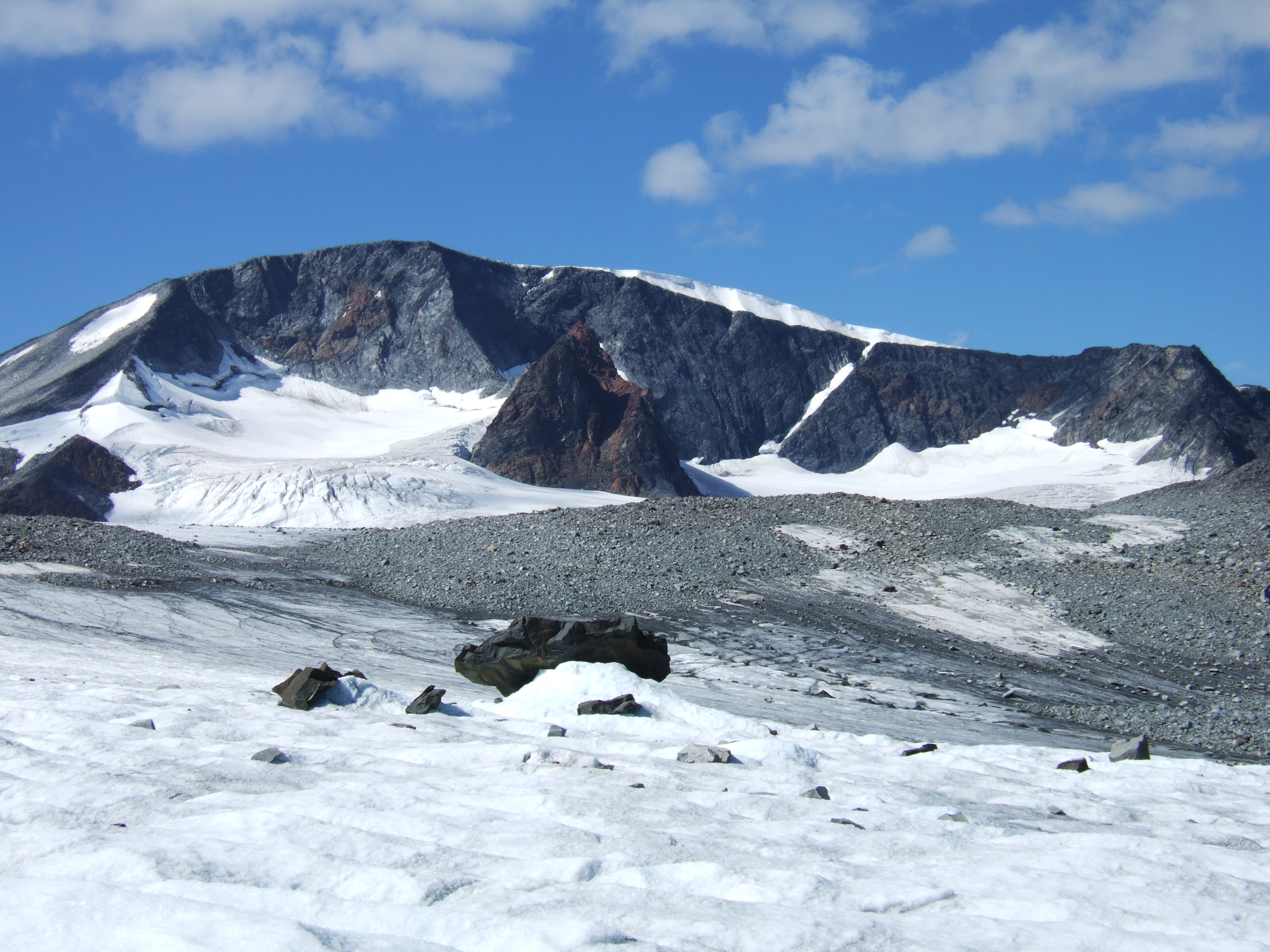

Highest point
- Elevation: 2,185 m (7,169 ft)
- Prominence: 50 m (160 ft)
- Parent peak: 1618 III Glittertinden
- Listing: #61 in Norway
- Coordinates: 61°35′33″N 8°28′21″E

Geography
- Interactive map of the mountain
- Location: Innlandet, Norway
- Parent range: Jotunheimen

Climbing
- First ascent: 1949

Veobreahesten is the 61st highest mountain in Norway. It is located in Lom Municipality in Innlandet county. The 2,185-metre (7,169 ft) tall mountain is in the Jotunheimen mountains within Jotunheimen National Park. The mountain sits about 27 kilometres (17 mi) south of the village of Fossbergom and about 45 kilometres (28 mi) southwest of the village of Vågåmo. The mountain is surrounded by several other notable mountains including Spiterhøe and Skauthøe to the northwest; Steinbukampen and Veopallan to the northeast; Veotinden, Veobreatinden, Austre Memurutinden to the southeast; Store Memurutinden to the south; and Leirhøi to the southwest.

The mountain was first climbed to the peak in 1949, making it the last of the Norwegian peaks higher than 2,000 metres (6,600 ft) to be climbed. The mountain is a nunatak standing in the middle of the glacier under the neighboring mountain Leirhøi. Its late ascent is due to this remote location, and the rather challenging approach.

== Name ==
The first element is the name of the glacier Veobreen. The last element is the finite form of hest which means 'horse' (several mountains in Norway are named after animals). The name of the glacier is a compound of the river name Veo and the finite form of bre which means 'glacier'. The river name (Old Norse: Viða) is derived from the word viðr which means 'wood' or 'forest'.

== See also ==
- List of mountains of Norway by height
