= Memurutindan =

Mountain ridge in Lom, Norway

- Memurutindene
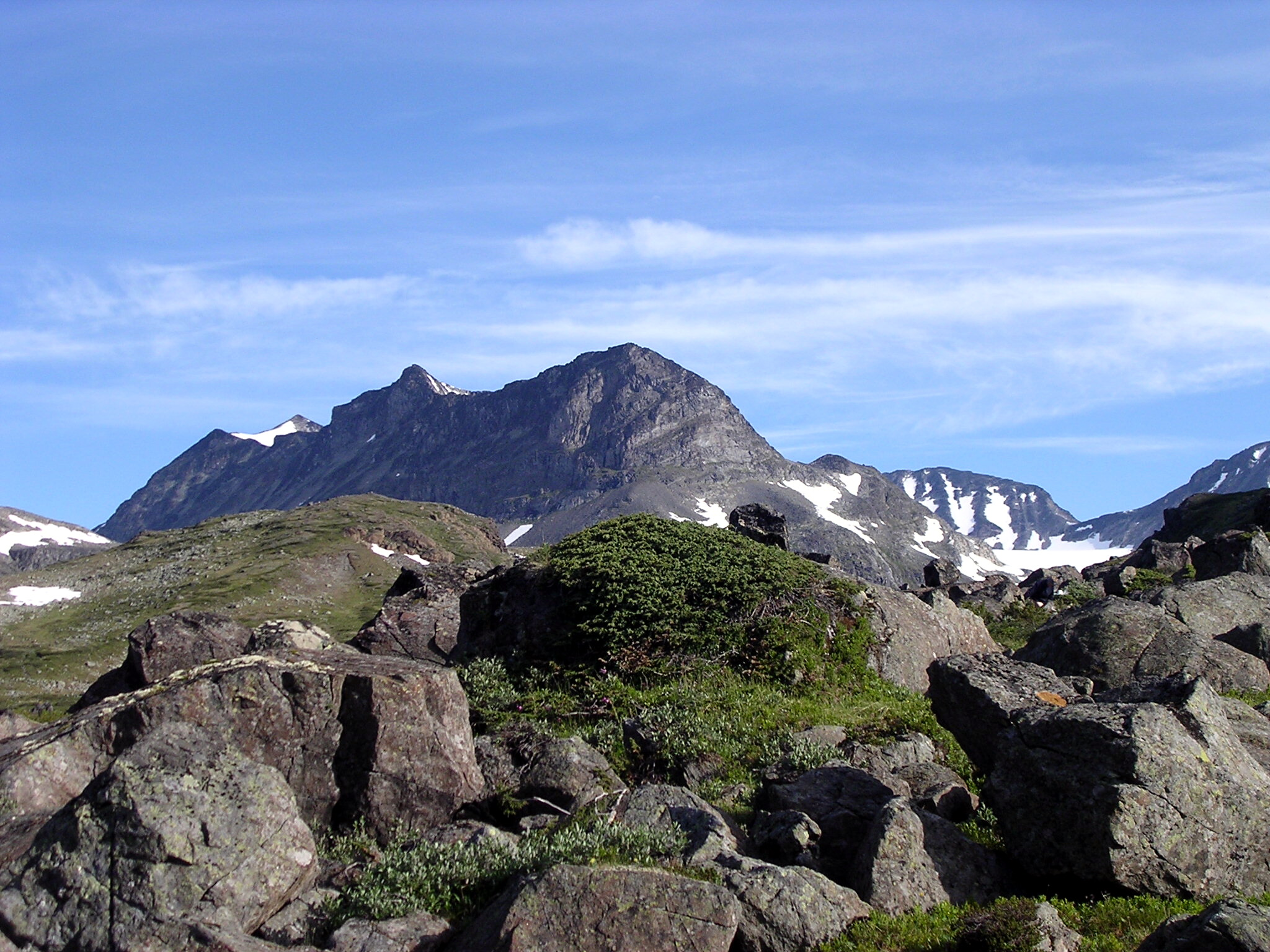
- Store Memurutinden

Highest point
- Peak: Store Memurutinden, Lom Municipality, Norway
- Elevation: 2,366 m (7,762 ft)
- Coordinates: 61.56627°N 8.48301°E

Geography
- Location: Innlandet, Norway
- Range coordinates: 61.55799°N 8.4639°E
- Topo map: 1618 III Glittertinden

Memurutindan is a chain of mountains in the Memurutind massif in Norway. It is located in Lom Municipality in Innlandet county. The massif is home to 13 mountains, many of which have peaks over 2,000 metres (6,600 ft).

Four peaks form the highest parts of the chain:

- Store Memurutinden which reaches 2,364 metres (7,756 ft) at the highest point
- Austtoppen which reaches 2,367 metres (7,766 ft) at its highest point
- Vestre Memurutindane which reaches 2,243 metres (7,359 ft) at its highest point
- Austre Memurutinden which reaches 2,301 metres (7,549 ft) at its highest point

The mountains surround a glacier field called Austre Memurubrean, and to the south of Vestre Memurutinden is another glacier called Vestre Memurubrean, and to the north of the massif lies the large Veobreen glacier.

== See also ==
- List of mountains of Norway by height
