= Veotinden =

Mountain in Innlandet, Norway

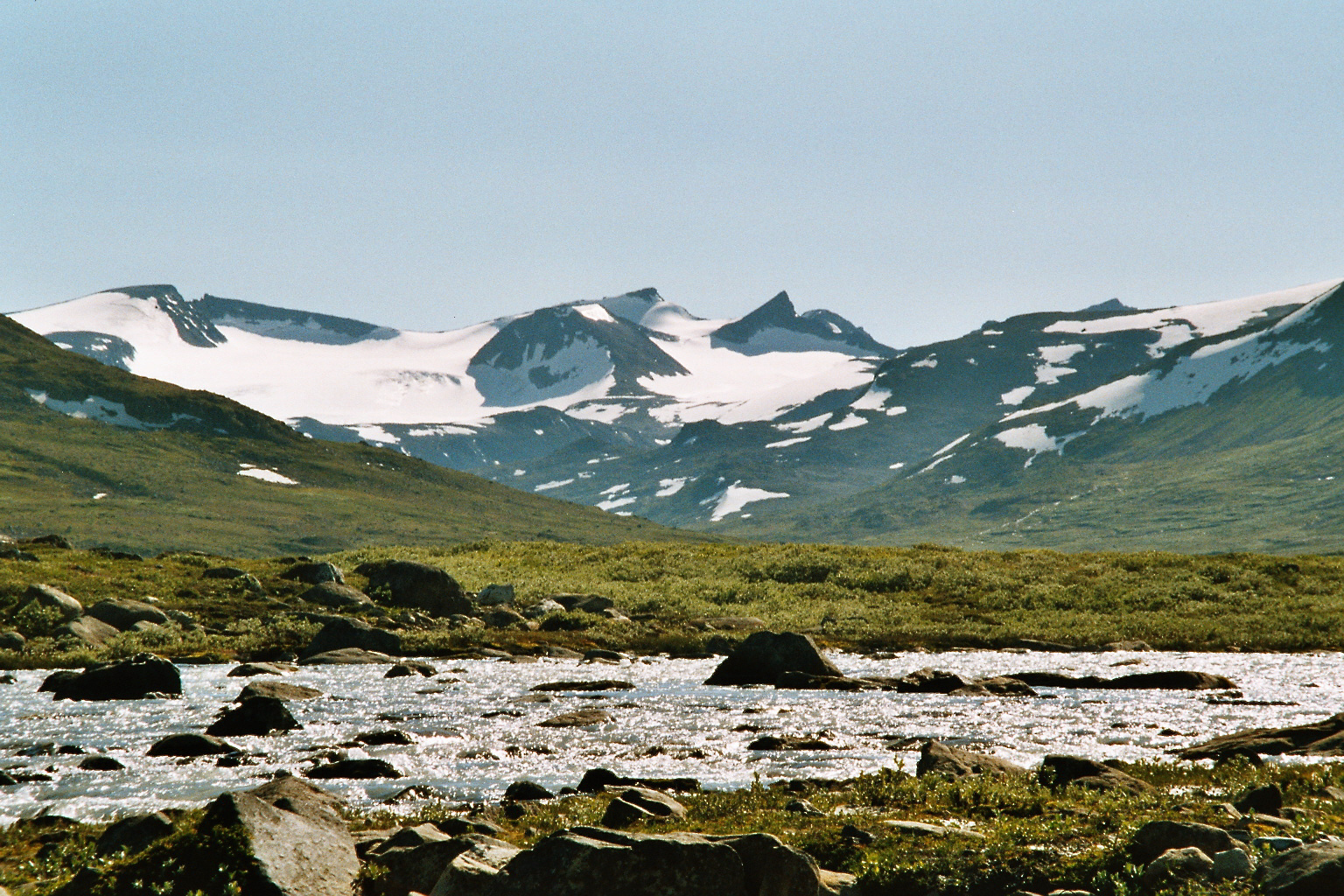
- View of the mountain

Highest point
- Elevation: 2,267 m (7,438 ft)
- Prominence: 145 m (476 ft)
- Parent peak: Store Memurutinden
- Isolation: 1.5 km (0.93 mi)
- Coordinates: 61°34′20″N 8°31′56″E

Geography
- Interactive map of the mountain
- Location: Innlandet, Norway
- Parent range: Jotunheimen

Veotinden is a mountain on the border of Vågå Municipality and Lom Municipality in Innlandet county, Norway. The 2,267-metre (7,438 ft) tall mountain is located in the Jotunheimen mountains within Jotunheimen National Park. The mountain sits about 30 kilometres (19 mi) south of the village of Fossbergom and about 45 kilometres (28 mi) southwest of the village of Vågåmo. The mountain is surrounded by several other notable mountains including Styggehøbretindan and Styggehøi to the east; Blåbreahøe to the southeast; Memurutindene to the southwest; Veobreahesten, Veobretinden, and Leirhøi to the northwest; and Veopallan to the north.

Veotinden is a large mountain that has a nearly 2-kilometre (1.2 mi) long ridge with three main peaks. The northern and southern peaks form part of the municipal border between Lom and Vågå municipalities while the middle peak lies just inside Lom municipality. The three peaks are:

- Nørdre Veotinden is the northern peak which reaches an elevation of 2,120 metres (6,960 ft).
- Store Veotinden lies in the middle of the ridge and it reaches 2,241 metres (7,352 ft) above sea level.
- Søre Veotinden is the southern peak and this one reaches an elevation of 2,267 metres (7,438 ft).

Both the east and west sides of this steep, narrow mountain ridge are covered by glaciers. The Veobreen glacier is on the west side and the Styggehøbrean glacier lies on the east side.

== See also ==
- List of mountains of Norway by height
