= Høgtunga =

Høgtunga may refer to:

- Høgtunga (Lesja), a mountain in Lesja municipality in Innlandet county, Norway
- Høgtunga (Lom), a mountain in Lom municipality in Innlandet county, Norway
- Høgtunga (Rauma), a mountain in Rauma municipality in Møre og Romsdal county, Norway
