= Hinnotefjellet =

Mountain in Innlandet, Norway

- Interactive map of the mountain

Highest point
- Elevation: 2,114 m (6,936 ft)
- Prominence: 208 m (682 ft)
- Parent peak: Surtningssue
- Isolation: 1.7 km (1.1 mi)
- Coordinates: 61°31′08″N 8°27′04″E

Geography
- Location: Innlandet, Norway
- Parent range: Jotunheimen
- Topo map: 1518 II Galdhøpiggen

Hinnotefjellet is a mountain in Lom Municipality in Innlandet county, Norway. The 2,114-metre (6,936 ft) tall mountain is located in the Jotunheimen mountains within Jotunheimen National Park. The mountain sits about 41 kilometres (25 mi) northeast of the village of Øvre Årdal and about 50 kilometres (31 mi) southwest of the village of Vågåmo. The mountain is surrounded by several other notable mountains including Reinstinden to the east; Storådalshøe and Høgtunga to the south; Semeltinden to the west; Søre Hellstugutinden, Nestsøre Hellstugutinden, Store Hellstugutinden and Midtre Hellstugutinden to the northwest; and the Memurutindene mountains to the northeast. The Vestre Memurubrean glacier lies north of this mountain.

== See also ==
- List of mountains of Norway by height
