= Store Hellstugutinden =

Mountain in Innlandet, Norway

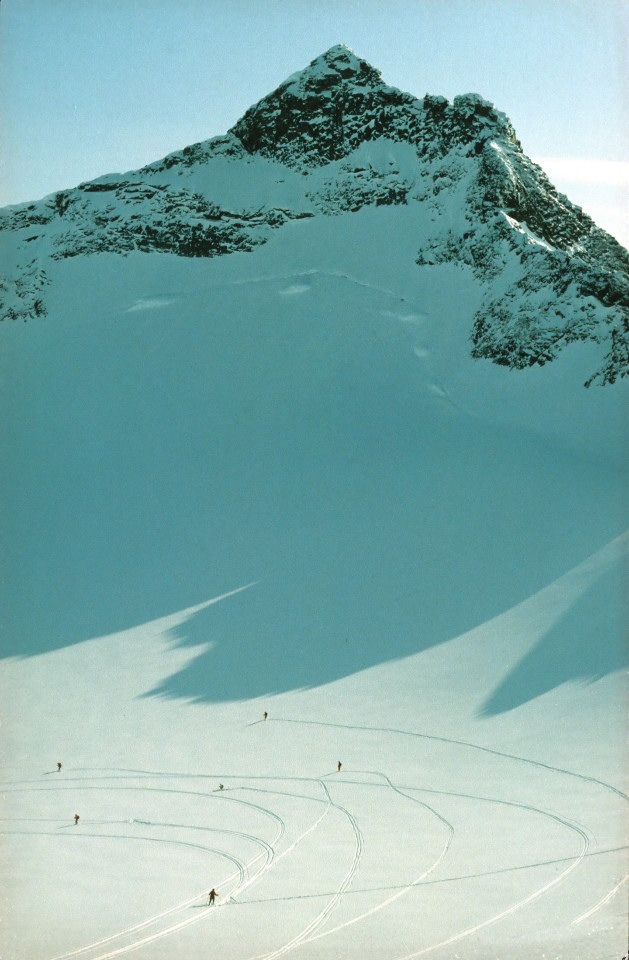

Highest point
- Elevation: 2,345 m (7,694 ft)
- Prominence: 402 m (1,319 ft)
- Parent peak: Surtingssue
- Isolation: 3.6 km (2.2 mi)
- Listing: #11 in Norway
- Coordinates: 61°32′40″N 8°25′41″E

Geography
- Interactive map of the mountain
- Location: Innlandet, Norway
- Parent range: Jotunheimen
- Topo map: 1518 II Galdhøpiggen

Climbing
- First ascent: 1 September 1881 (William Cecil Slingsby, Johannes Vigdal)

Store Hellstugutinden is a mountain in Lom Municipality in Innlandet county, Norway. The 2,345-metre (7,694 ft) tall mountain is located in the Jotunheimen mountains within Jotunheimen National Park. The mountain sits about 42 kilometres (26 mi) northeast of the village of Øvre Årdal and about 52 kilometres (32 mi) southwest of the village of Vågåmo. The mountain is surrounded by several other notable mountains including Blåbreahøe and Surtningssue to the east; Reinstinden and Hinnotefjellet to the southeast; Nestsøre Hellstugutinden and Søre Hellstugutinden to the south; Semeltinden to the southwest; Urdadalstindene to the west; Midtre Hellstugutinden and Nørdre Hellstugutinden to the north; and Store Memurutinden and Austre Memurutinden to the northeast.

Store Hellstugutinden is the highest of several peaks along the Hellstugutindane ridge which runs between the Hellstugubrean/Vestre Memurubrean glaciers in east and Urdadalen valley in the west. The ridge Hellstugutindane consists of these mountain peaks:

- Nordre Hellstugutinden
- Midtre Hellstugutinden
- Store Hellstugutinden
- Nestsøndre Hellstugutinden
- Søndre Hellstugutinden

== Name ==
The first element is the name of the Hellstugu cabin which was built as a shelter for hunters. The last element is the finite form of tind which means 'mountain peak'. The name of the cabin is a compound of hella which means 'flat stone' or 'flagstone' and stugu which means 'house with one room' or 'cabin'. Most houses in Norway are mostly made of wood, but here they had to use stone because the lack of wood. The first word in the name is store which means 'big'.

== See also ==
- List of mountains of Norway by height
