= Søre Hellstugutinden =

Mountain in Innlandet, Norway

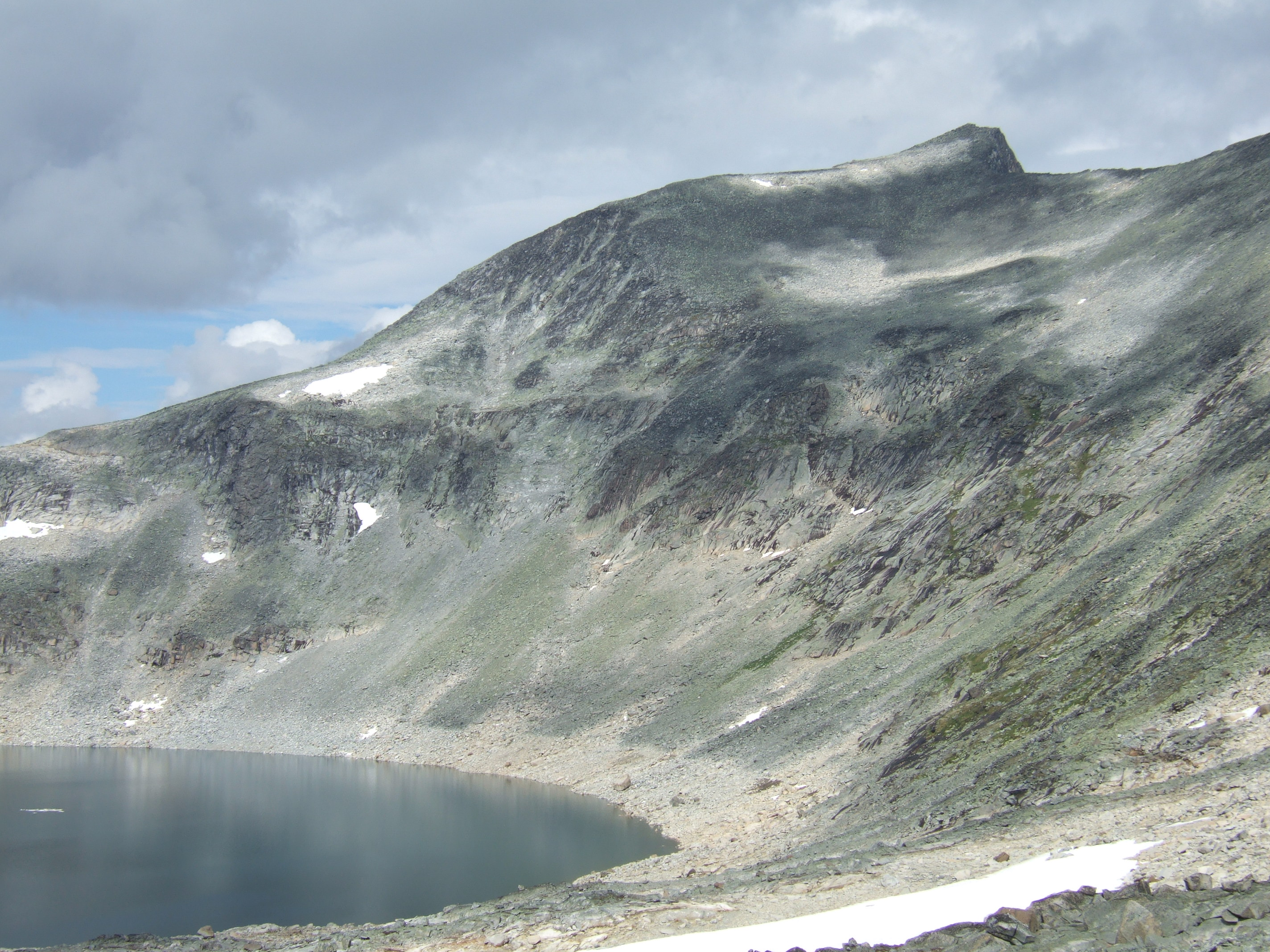
- View of the mountain seen from Semelholet

Highest point
- Elevation: 2,189 m (7,182 ft)
- Prominence: 148 m (486 ft)
- Parent peak: Store Hellstugutinden
- Isolation: 0.755 km (0.469 mi) to Nestsøre Hellstugutinden
- Coordinates: 61°31′42″N 8°25′20″E

Geography
- Interactive map of the mountain
- Location: Innlandet, Norway
- Parent range: Jotunheimen
- Topo map: 1518 II Galdhøpiggen

Søre Hellstugutinden is a mountain in Lom Municipality in Innlandet county, Norway. The 2,189-metre (7,182 ft) tall mountain is located in the Jotunheimen mountains within Jotunheimen National Park. The mountain sits about 40 kilometres (25 mi) northeast of the village of Øvre Årdal and about 53 kilometres (33 mi) southwest of the village of Vågåmo. The mountain is surrounded by several other notable mountains including Surtningssue to the east; Reinstinden and Hinnotefjellet to the southeast; Storådalshøe to the south; Semeltinden to the southwest; Urdadalstindene to the northwest; Nestsøre Hellstugutinden, Store Hellstugutinden, Midtre Hellstugutinden, and Nørdre Hellstugutinden to the north; and Store Memurutinden and Austre Memurutinden to the northeast.

== Name ==
The first element is the name of the Hellstugu cabin which was built as a shelter for hunters. The last element is the finite form of tind which means 'mountain peak'. The name of the cabin is a compound of hella which means 'flat stone' or 'flagstone' and stugu which means 'house with one room' or 'cabin'. Most houses in Norway are mostly made of wood, but here they had to use stone because the lack of wood. The first word in the name is søre which means 'south' since it is the southernmost peak on the mountain ridge.

== See also ==
- List of mountains of Norway by height
