= Surtningssue =

Mountain in Innlandet, Norway

- Surtningssui (unofficial)
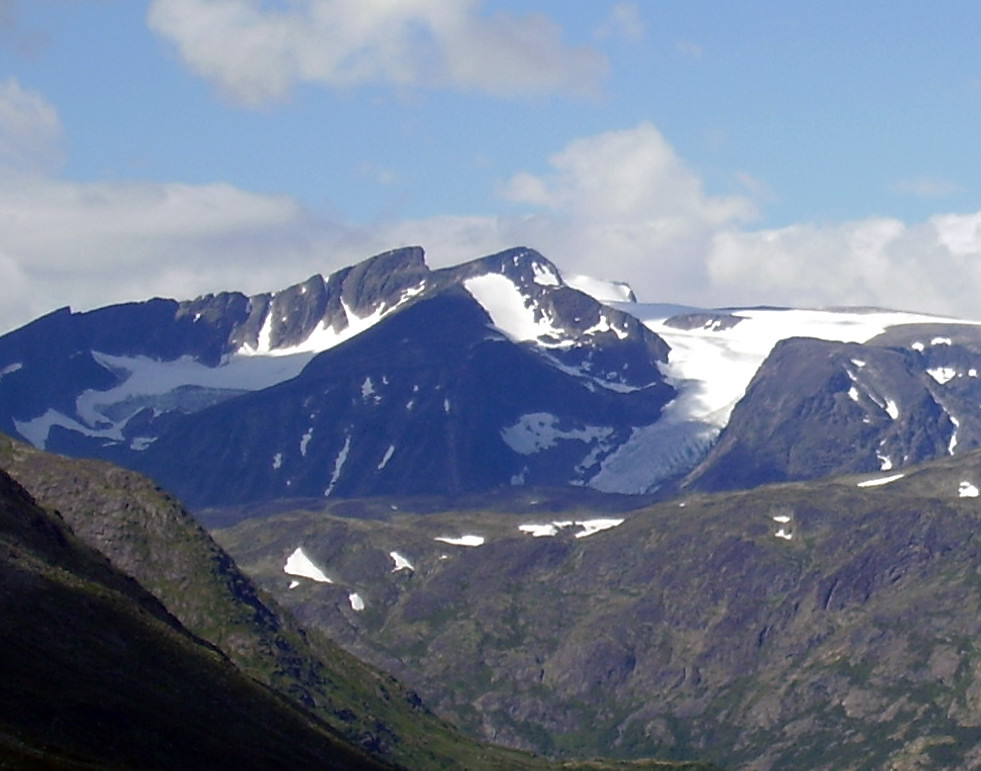
- Surtningssue seen from Valdresflya

Highest point
- Elevation: 2,368 m (7,769 ft)
- Prominence: 718 m (2,356 ft)
- Parent peak: Glittertinden
- Isolation: 12.8 km (8.0 mi)
- Listing: #7 in Norway
- Coordinates: 61°32′03″N 8°34′22″E

Geography
- Interactive map of the mountain
- Location: Innlandet, Norway
- Parent range: Jotunheimen
- Topo map: 1618 III Glittertinden

Climbing
- First ascent: ca. 1840 (Johan Sverdrup)
- Easiest route: Hiking

Surtningssue is a mountain on the border of Vågå Municipality and Lom Municipality in Innlandet county, Norway. The 2,368-metre (7,769 ft) tall mountain is the seventh-highest mountain in Norway. It is located in the Jotunheimen mountains within Jotunheimen National Park. The mountain sits about 11 kilometres (6.8 mi) southeast of the village of Fossbergom and about 14 kilometres (8.7 mi) southwest of the village of Vågåmo. The mountain is surrounded by several other notable mountains including Veotinden, Styggehøbretindan, and Blåbreahøe to the north; Surtningssuoksle to the northeast; Besshøe and Gloptinden to the southeast; Reinstinden, Raudhamran, and Hinnotefjellet to the southwest; Store Hellstugutinden, Nestsøre Hellstugutinden, and Søre Hellstugutinden to the west; and Austre Memurutinden and Store Memurutinden to the northwest.

Surtningssue has several distinct peaks, of which Store Surtningssue is the highest. The river Muru runs through the valley on the southwestern side of the mountain. Surtningssue is most easily reached from the cabin Memurubu, along the northern shore of the lake Gjendin.

== Name ==
The first element is the genitive of a word *surtning which means 'the black one'. The last element is the finite form of su which means 'sow' - thus 'the black sow'. (It is common in Norway to compare the shape of mountains with animals.)

== See also ==
- List of mountains of Norway by height
