= List of mountains in Norway by height =

There are 291 peaks in Norway with elevations of over 2,000 metres (6,562 ft) above sea level and that have a topographic prominence of more than 10 m (33 ft). The following list includes those 186 that have a topographic prominence of 50 m (160 ft) or more. The topographic isolation refers to the shortest horizontal distance one would have to travel to find a higher summit.

== Location of peaks ==
Most of these peaks are in Lom Municipality, Skjåk Municipality, Luster Municipality, and Vågå Municipality, connected to the mountain chain that reaches its prominence with Jotunheimen. There are also several peaks in Dovrefjell, Rondane, Dovre, Lesja, and Folldal that also reach above 2,000 metres (6,600 ft). All the peaks are to be found in 14 topographical maps (Norge 1:50000) published by the Norwegian government cartography office, of which 21 peaks are in 1518 II Galdhøpiggen, 18 in 1618 III Glittertinden, and 13 in 1617 IV Gjende. The northernmost is in the Dovre area, meaning there are no 2000 m peaks in northern Norway, even though there are some almost 2000 m there, and some above 2000 m in Sweden near the border.

Most of the difficult summits were ascended in the late 19th and early 20th century by a combination of Norwegian explorers, local guides (in particular the Sulheim family), and British adventurers. Five women – "Margaret S. Green", "Theresa Bertheau", "Antonette Kamstrup", "Anne Aukrust", and "Rønnaug Garmo" – were the first to ascend some of these peaks. Aukrust and Garmo were from farms in Lom, where many of the peaks are located. The peak most recently climbed for the first time was Veobrehesten, first ascended in 1949.

== Highest peaks in Norway with prominence above 50 m ==
The listing originates from www.nfo2000m.no.

Rank	Name	Elevation (m)	Prominence (m)	Municipality	Topo map	Isolation (m)	Coordinates
1	Galdhøpiggen	2469	2372	Lom	1518 II Galdhøpiggen		61°38′10″N 8°18′44″E
2	Glittertinden	2452	975	Lom	1618 III Glittertinden	13090	61°39′4″N 8°33′26″E
3	Store Skagastølstinden	2405	1010	Luster / Årdal	1517 IV Hurrungane	30470	61°27′41″N 7°52′17″E
4	Store Styggedalstinden, E	2387	155	Luster	1517 IV "Hurrungane"	1630	61°27′52″N 7°54′5″E
5	Skardstinden	2377	280	Lom	1518 II "Galdhøpiggen"	2470	61°38′0″N 8°15′58″E
6	Vesle Galdhøpiggen or Veslepiggen	2369	150	Lom	1518 II "Galdhøpiggen"	580	61°38′27″N 8°18′23″E
7	Surtningssue or Surtningssui	2368	710	Lom / Vågå	1618 III "Glittertinden"	13070	61°32′3″N 8°34′20″E
8	Store Memurutinden, E	2366	336	Lom	1618 III "Glittertinden"	5820	61°34′3″N 8°29′17″E
9	Jervvasstind	2351	120	Luster	1517 IV "Hurrungane"	450	61°27′52″N 7°54′35″E
10	Sentraltind	2348	115	Luster	1517 IV "Hurrungane"	650	61°27′49″N 7°52′57″E
11	Store Hellstugutinden	2346	450	Lom	1518 II "Galdhøpiggen"	3680	61°32′39″N 8°25′41″E
12	Storjuvtinden or Storgjuvtinden	2344	110	Lom	1518 II "Galdhøpiggen"	1190	61°37′49″N 8°17′37″E
13	Store Knutsholstinden	2340	970	Vågå	1617 IV "Gjende"	12210	61°25′28″N 8°33′45″E
14	Vetle Skagastølstind	2340	70	Luster	1517 IV "Hurrungane"	380	61°27′52″N 7°52′27″E
15	Midtre Hellstugutinden	2339	158	Lom	1518 II "Galdhøpiggen"	820	61°33′5″N 8°25′27″E
16	Leirhøe	2330	290	Lom	1518 II "Galdhøpiggen"	2710	61°35′28″N 8°28′1″E
17	Tjørnholstinden	2329	340	Vågå	1617 IV "Gjende"	5030	61°26′42″N 8°38′47″E
18	Bukkehøe or Bukkehøi	2314	350	Lom	1518 II "Galdhøpiggen"	3250	61°36′15″N 8°15′57″E
19	Store Tverråtinden	2309	190	Lom	1518 II "Galdhøpiggen"	1750	61°36′54″N 8°18′5″E
20	Tverråtinden, M	2302	70	Lom	1518 II "Galdhøpiggen"	760	61°36′51″N 8°18′56″E
21	Memurutinden, E1	2301	170	Lom	1618 III "Glittertinden"	1070	61°33′57″N 8°30′28″E
22	Trollsteinseggje	2300	90	Lom	1618 III "Glittertinden"	1000	61°39′37″N 8°33′29″E
23	Leirungstinden, E	2288	270	Vågå	1617 IV "Gjende"	2070	61°25′19″N 8°36′3″E
24	Snøhetta; Stortoppen	2286	1675	Dovre	1519 IV "Snøhetta"	82380	62°19′12″N 9°16′6″E
25	Galdhøe	2283	90	Lom	1518 II "Galdhøpiggen"	1190	61°38′59″N 8°19′7″E
26	Memurutinden V-1	2280	80	Lom	1518 II "Galdhøpiggen"	1290	61°33′28″N 8°27′49″E
27	Veotinden, S	2267	130	Lom / Vågå	1618 III "Glittertinden"	1480	61°34′19″N 8°31′56″E
28	Mesmogtinden	2264	770	Vågå	1617 IV "Gjende"	2770	61°24′14″N 8°32′1″E
29	Snøhetta; Hettpiggen	2261	50	Dovre	1519 IV "Snøhetta"	250	62°18′59″N 9°15′3″E
30	Storgrovhøe	2259	180	Lom	1518 II "Galdhøpiggen"	1100	61°38′35″N 8°16′1″E
31	Besshøe	2258	650	Vågå	1618 III "Glittertinden"	5770	61°31′4″N 8°41′13″E
32	Nautgardstinden	2258	573	Lom / Vågå	1618 III "Glittertinden"	10270	61°36′11″N 8°45′35″E
33	Hellstugutinden, S1	2255	114	Lom	1518 II "Galdhøpiggen"	660	61°32′19″N 8°25′48″E
34	Snøhetta; Vesttoppen	2253	70	Dovre	1519 IV "Snøhetta"	70	62°18′57″N 9°14′59″E
35	Storgrovhøe, N	2253	60	Lom	1518 II "Galdhøpiggen"	960	61°39′0″N 8°16′41″E
36	Leirungstinden, W	2250	200	Vågå	1617 IV "Gjende"	1190	61°24′58″N 8°34′56″E
37	Memurutinden, W3	2243	80	Lom	1518 II "Galdhøpiggen"	710	61°33′6″N 8°27′43″E
38	Veotinden	2240	70	Lom	1618 III "Glittertinden"	450	61°34′34″N 8°31′52″E
39	Semeltinden	2236	450	Lom	1518 II "Galdhøpiggen"	3090	61°30′48″N 8°24′22″E
40	Visbreatinden	2234	560	Lom	1518 II "Galdhøpiggen"	4230	61°31′49″N 8°20′7″E
41	Styggehøbretindan, SE	2232	95	Vågå	1618 III "Glittertinden"	1350	61°34′4″N 8°33′21″E
42	Memurutinden, W4	2230	80	Lom	1618 III "Glittertinden"	920	61°32′47″N 8°28′30″E
43	Høgdebrotet	2226	80	Vågå	1617 IV "Gjende"	1310	61°27′11″N 8°40′8″E
44	Storebjørn	2222	800	Lom	1518 II "Galdhøpiggen"	9240	61°32′53″N 8°8′14″E
45	Heillstugutinden, N3	2218	90	Lom	1518 II "Galdhøpiggen"	1170	61°33′42″N 8°25′13″E
46	Store Bukkeholstinden	2213	160	Lom	1518 II "Galdhøpiggen"	2020	61°34′45″N 8°18′28″E
46	Store Styggehøe	2213	230	Lom	1518 II "Galdhøpiggen"	2020	61°35′28″N 8°20′13″E
48	Skarvflytindene, S	2210	60	Vågå	1617 IV "Gjende"	460	61°25′59″N 8°36′36″E
49	Storstyggesvånåtinden	2209	540	Lesja	1419 I "Storskrymten"	4780	62°17′3″N 9°11′16″E
50	Kalvehøgdi, W2	2208	530	Vang / Vågå	1617 IV "Gjende"	3310	61°23′34″N 8°37′15″E
50	Store Smørstabbtinden	2208	200	LomStore StyggehøeLom	1518 II "Galdhøpiggen"	2820	61°34′19″N 8°7′8″E
51	Langedalstinden	2206	100	Vang / Vågå	1617 IV "Gjende"	650	61°24′2″N 8°31′24″E
52	Vesle Knutsholstinden	2205	75	Vågå	1617 IV "Gjende"	400	61°25′4″N 8°34′32″E
53	Store Austanbotntind	2203	475	Luster / Årdal	1517 IV "Hurrungane"	5200	61°25′55″N 7°47′44″E
54	Store Trollhøin, N	2201	347	Lom	1618 III "Glittertinden"	4780	61°42′5″N 8°34′56″E
55	Blåbreahøe, S2	2196	60	Lom / Vågå	1618 III "Glittertinden"	1390	61°32′38″N 8°33′22″E
56	Kvitskardtinden	2193	300	Vang / Vågå	1617 IV "Gjende"	1360	61°23′48″N 8°33′16″E
57	Slettmarkhøe	2190	440	Lom	1617 IV "Gjende"	2250	61°24′2″N 8°28′53″E
58	Søre Hellstugutinden, S2	2189	140	Lom	1518 II "Galdhøpiggen"	1230	61°31′41″N 8°25′19″E
59	Sokse	2189	160	Lom	1518 II "Galdhøpiggen"	1370	61°33′42″N 8°8′0″E
60	Knutsholstinden, N	2185	55	Vågå	1617 IV "Gjende"	1150	61°26′4″N 8°33′21″E
61	Veobreahesten	2185	50	Lom	1618 III "Glittertinden"	340	61°35′33″N 8°28′21″E
62	Veobreatinden	2183	100	Lom	1618 III "Glittertinden"	1410	61°34′48″N 8°29′26″E
63	Kalvehøgde	2178	85	Vang / Vågå	1617 IV "Gjende"	1360	61°23′30″N 8°38′46″E
64	Rondeslottet	2178	1232	Dovre / Folldal	1718 I "Rondane"	53760	61°54′54″N 9°51′4″E
65	Stornubben	2174	170	Lom / Vågå	1618 III "Glittertinden"	2260	61°37′39″N 8°47′43″E
66	Store Svartdalspiggen	2174	180	Vågå / Lom	1617 IV "Gjende"	1860	61°25′2″N 8°30′46″E
67	Hestbreapiggan, N2	2172	870	Skjåk	1518 IV "Pollfoss"	15090	61°45′1″N 8°5′10″E
68	Loftet	2170	340	Lom	1518 II "Galdhøpiggen"	5720	61°37′23″N 8°7′33″E
69	Trollsteinrundhøe	2170	140	Lom	1618 III "Glittertinden"	900	61°40′30″N 8°33′25″E
70	Store Rauddalseggje	2168	650	Luster	1517 I "Tyin"	7050	61°28′3″N 8°18′37″E
71	Skagastølstinden, N	2167	60	Luster	1517 IV "Hurrungane"	410	61°28′23″N 7°51′55″E
72	Styggehøbretinden, N	2168	60	Vågå	1618 III "Glittertinden"	760	61°34′37″N 8°32′43″E
73	Bukkeholstinden, W4	2166	50	Lom	1518 II "Galdhøpiggen"	600	61°35′47″N 8°16′11″E
74	Store Svartdalspiggen	2165	170	Lom / Vågå		1800	61°25′1″N 8°30′46″E
75	Slettmarkpiggen	2163	150	Vang / Lom	1517 I "Tyin"	850	61°23′52″N 8°27′59″E
76	Tverrbottindene	2161	280	Lom	1518 II "Galdhøpiggen"	2210	61°34′33″N 8°15′19″E
77	Hestbreapiggan, mid-1	2160	190	Skjåk	1518 III "Sygnefjell"	1130	61°44′25″N 8°4′55″E
78	Skarddalseggje	2159	570	Lom	1517 I "Tyin"	2490	61°29′6″N 8°20′21″E
79	Store Rauddalstinden	2157	639	Luster	1517 I "Tyin"	6520	61°29′41″N 8°11′12″E
80	Urdanostindene	2157	692	Vang / Luster / Årdal	1517 I "Tyin"	7820	61°25′36″N 8°9′0″E
81	Veslfjelltinden	2157	190	Lom	1518 II "Galdhøpiggen"	1590	61°36′36″N 8°6′50″E
82	Gråhøe	2154	60	Lom	1618 III "Glittertinden"	980	61°41′25″N 8°33′41″E
83	Skarvflytindene, mid	2154	60	Vågå	1617 IV "Gjende"	680	61°26′12″N 8°35′59″E
84	Tverrbottindene, E1	2151	90	Lom	1518 II "Galdhøpiggen"	930	61°34′15″N 8°16′10″E
85	Veslebjørn, S	2150	100	Lom	1518 II "Galdhøpiggen"	760	61°33′19″N 8°7′40″E
86	Bukkeholstinden, N	2149	100	Lom	1518 II "Galdhøpiggen"	840	61°35′35″N 8°18′4″E
87	Store Dyrhaugstinden	2147	410	Luster	1517 IV "Hurrungane"	2210	61°27′35″N 7°49′49″E
88	Semelholstinden	2147	140	Lom	1518 II "Galdhøpiggen"	1250	61°32′6″N 8°21′25″E
89	Tjønnholsoksle	2145	130	Vågå	1617 IV "Gjende"	1410	61°25′58″N 8°38′14″E
90	Hestbreapiggan, mid-2	2143	50	Skjåk	1518 III "Sygnefjell"	1600	61°44′26″N 8°3′5″E
91	Ryggehøe	2142	300	Lom	1618 III "Glittertinden"	3600	61°37′8″N 8°33′38″E
92	Snøholstinden or Sjogholstinden	2141	676	Vang	1517 I "Tyin"	2900	61°26′29″N 8°18′36″E
93	Memurutinden, W5	2140	80	Lom	1618 III "Glittertinden"	1060	61°32′21″N 8°29′18″E
94	Hestbreapiggan, W2	2139	50	Skjåk / Lom	1518 III "Sygnefjell"	2330	61°43′56″N 8°0′40″E
95	Storronden	2138	390	Sel	1718 I "Rondane"	2670	61°53′30″N 9°51′43″E
96	Mjølkedalstinden	2137	550	Luster	1517 I "Tyin"	3310	61°27′34″N 8°15′2″E
97	Svartdalspiggen, N	2137	50	Vågå / Lom	1617 IV "Gjende"	540	61°25′18″N 8°30′33″E
98	Kniven	2133	100	Lom	1518 II "Galdhøpiggen"	540	61°34′4″N 8°7′28″E
99	Hestbreapiggan, E1	2132	50	Skjåk	1518 II "Galdhøpiggen"	1460	61°44′31″N 8°6′33″E
100	Store Ringstinden	2124	270	Årdal / Luster	1517 IV "Hurrungane"	1130	61°26′31″N 7°48′0″E
101	Veotinden, N	2120	50	Lom / Vågå	1618 III "Glittertinden"	910	61°35′3″N 8°31′58″E
102	Torfinnstinden, E	2119	190	Vang	1617 IV "Gjende"	2860	61°22′24″N 8°34′38″E
103	Skeie	2118	60	Lom	1518 II "Galdhøpiggen"	670	61°33′24″N 8°6′56″E
104	Store Urdadalstinden	2116	270	Lom	1518 II "Galdhøpiggen"	2110	61°33′5″N 8°22′38″E
105	Høgronden	2115	700	Folldal	1718 I "Rondane"	4170	61°56′39″N 9°54′2″E
106	Hinnotefjellet	2114	210	Lom	1518 II "Galdhøpiggen"	1870	61°31′8″N 8°27′4″E
107	Gravdalstinden	2113	240	Lom / Luster	1518 II "Galdhøpiggen"	3010	61°31′22″N 8°7′3″E
108	Tverrbottindene, W1	2113	120	Lom	1518 II "Galdhøpiggen"	830	61°34′57″N 8°14′54″E
109	Torfinnstinden, mid	2110	100	Vang	1617 IV "Gjende"	320	61°22′27″N 8°34′18″E
110	Larstinden	2106	250	Dovre / Lesja	1519 IV "Snøhetta"	1530	62°19′14″N 9°13′19″E
111	Tverrbottindene, E2	2106	50	Lom	1518 II "Galdhøpiggen"	760	61°33′51″N 8°16′4″E
112	Rasletinden	2105	110	Vang / Vågå	1617 IV "Gjende"	1980	61°23′43″N 8°41′58″E
113	Tverrbytthornet	2102	275	Lom	1518 II "Galdhøpiggen"	2210	61°33′29″N 8°18′27″E
114	Skarddalstinden	2100	150	Lom	1517 I "Tyin"	1100	61°29′21″N 8°19′13″E
115	Skagsnebb W1 or Katedralen	2093	120	Lom	1518 II "Galdhøpiggen"	1310	61°36′6″N 8°7′52″E
116	Veslbreatinden	2092	120	Lom	1518 II "Galdhøpiggen"	1380	61°35′36″N 8°6′42″E
117	Hestdalshøgdi	2091	660	Skjåk	1518 IV "Pollfoss"	6200	61°48′2″N 8°2′11″E
118	Nautgardsoksle	2089	50	Lom	1618 III "Glittertinden"	1610	61°36′37″N 8°44′0″E
119	Tverrådalskyrkja	2087	650	Skjåk / Luster	1418 II "Mørkrisdalen"	17170	61°44′35″N 7°41′13″E
120	Rauddalstinden, E3	2086	415	Luster	1517 I "Tyin"	2950	61°29′21″N 8°15′53″E
121	Store Langvasstinden	2085	160	Lesja	1419 I "Storskrymten"	1120	62°18′58″N 9°12′9″E
122	Lodalskåpa	2083	760	Luster / Stryn	1418 IV "Lodalskåpa"	25980	61°47′26″N 7°12′18″E
123	Store Soleibotntinden	2083	170	Luster	1517 IV "Hurrungane"	960	61°26′51″N 7°47′12″E
124	Leirungskampen	2079	70	Vågå	1617 IV "Gjende"	1110	61°23′45″N 8°36′4″E
125	Hestbreapiggan, W3	2078	110	Skjåk	1518 III "Sygnefjell"	1010	61°43′41″N 7°59′39″E
126	Galdeberget or Galdebergtinden	2075	390	Vang	1517 I "Tyin"	2300	61°22′50″N 8°26′32″E
127	Stølsnostinden	2074	640	Årdal	1517 IV "Hurrungane"	5450	61°23′46″N 8°4′13″E
128	Søre Dyrhaugstinden	2072	60	Luster / Årdal	1517 IV "Hurrungane"	500	61°27′19″N 7°50′40″E
129	Fannaråki or Fannaråken	2068	450	Luster	1518 III "Sygnefjell"	5340	61°30′59″N 7°54′29″E
130	Lomseggje or Storivilen	2068	290	Lom / Skjåk	1518 I "Skjåk"	15320	61°49′11″N 8°22′1″E
131	Falketind	2067	175	Årdal	1517 I "Tyin"	1910	61°23′4″N 8°5′49″E
132	Svartholshøe	2067	55	Lom	1618 III "Glittertinden"	700	61°40′51″N 8°33′42″E
133	Høgvagltinden, mid	2066	460	Luster	1518 II "Galdhøpiggen"	1810	61°30′19″N 8°15′38″E
134	Svartdalspiggen, S	2065	55	Vang / Vågå / Lom	1617 IV "Gjende"	550	61°24′12″N 8°30′40″E
135	Store Kvitingskjølen	2064	770	Lom	1618 IV "Lom"	9410	61°45′45″N 8°44′9″E
136	Midtmaradalstinden, N1	2062	90	Luster / Årdal	1517 IV "Hurrungane"	650	61°26′58″N 7°50′37″E
137	Kvitingskjølen, W	2060	110	Lom	1618 IV "Lom"	2020	61°45′35″N 8°41′52″E
138	Midtronden, W	2060	290	Dovre	1718 I "Rondane"	2200	61°56′39″N 9°51′31″E
139	Urdadalstinden, mid	2060	110	Lom	1518 II "Galdhøpiggen"	1030	61°32′34″N 8°23′6″E
140	Rauddalstinden, W1	2059	140	Luster	1518 II "Galdhøpiggen"	930	61°30′5″N 8°10′34″E
141	Bukkeholstinden, SE	2058	55	Lom	1518 II "Galdhøpiggen"	1010	61°34′31″N 8°19′30″E
142	Store Midtmaradalstinden	2056	300	Årdal	1517 IV "Hurrungane"	1680	61°26′31″N 7°52′16″E
143	Soleibotntinden, S2	2049	50	Luster	1517 IV "Hurrungane"	470	61°26′39″N 7°47′32″E
144	Stornubben, NE	2049	95	Lom / Vågå	1618 III "Glittertinden"	740	61°38′13″N 8°48′44″E
145	Urdanostinden, S2	2048	55	Vang	1517 I "Tyin"	720	61°25′13″N 8°9′11″E
146	Holåtinden, mid	2047	220	Skjåk	1518 III "Sygnefjell"	6780	61°44′34″N 7°52′11″E
147	Smørstabbtinden, SW1	2045	90	Lom	1518 II "Galdhøpiggen"	1300	61°31′59″N 8°6′21″E
148	Moldurhøe	2044	145	Lom / Skjåk	1518 I "Skjåk"	5340	61°48′30″N 8°16′7″E
149	Vinjeronden	2044	90	Dovre / Sel / Folldal	1718 I "Rondane"	1250	61°54′14″N 9°50′56″E
150	Holåtinden, E	2043	200	Skjåk	1518 III "Sygnefjell"	1760	61°44′50″N 7°54′6″E
151	Midtronden, E	2042	90	Dovre / Folldal	1718 I "Rondane"	850	61°56′58″N 9°52′12″E
152	Eggen	2041	70	Vågå	1617 IV "Gjende"	1290	61°27′45″N 8°39′17″E
153	Mjølkedalspiggen	2040	130	Luster	1517 I "Tyin"	1100	61°26′36″N 8°10′53″E
154	Sagi, S	2040	250	Luster	1517 I "Tyin"	420	61°26′37″N 8°9′39″E
155	Holåtinden, W	2039	150	Skjåk / Luster	1518 III "Sygnefjell"	1400	61°44′35″N 7°50′35″E
156	Smørstabbtinden, S1	2033	50	Lom	1518 II "Galdhøpiggen"	740	61°31′52″N 8°7′8″E
157	Spiterhøe	2033	140	Lom	1518 II "Galdhøpiggen"	1270	61°36′45″N 8°26′21″E
158	Kyrkja	2032	280	Lom	1518 II "Galdhøpiggen"	1840	61°32′29″N 8°17′30″E
159	Langvasshøe, S or Visbretinden	2030	70	Lom	1518 II "Galdhøpiggen"	960	61°31′28″N 8°19′20″E
160	Stølsmaradalstinden	2026	210	Årdal	1517 IV "Hurrungane"	1990	61°25′56″N 7°49′59″E
161	Urdanostinden, N or Slingsbytind	2026	90	Luster	1517 I "Tyin"	970	61°26′5″N 8°8′36″E
162	Ringstinden, mid	2025	265	Årdal / Luster	1517 IV "Hurrungane"	1130	61°26′33″N 7°49′41″E
163	Steindalsnosi	2025	180	Luster	1518 III "Sygnefjell"	1170	61°31′36″N 7°54′14″E
164	Hesthøe	2021	210	Lom / Skjåk	1518 I "Skjåk"	5260	61°46′40″N 8°11′33″E
165	Stetinden	2020	445	Lom / Luster	1518 II "Galdhøpiggen"	2940	61°32′51″N 8°11′41″E
166	Nørdre Kalvehølotinden	2019	110	Vang	1617 IV "Gjende"	1860	61°22′17″N 8°37′53″E
167	Brenibba	2018	300	Luster	1418 IV "Lodalskåpa"	2970	61°45′52″N 7°11′39″E
168	Steinkollen; SW of Fortundalsbreen	2018	80	Luster	1418 II "Mørkrisdalen"	910	61°43′45″N 7°40′58″E
169	Grjotbrehesten	2018	100	Lom	1618 III "Glittertinden"	1100	61°40′28″N 8°34′40″E
170	Trolltinden earlier Sagtinden	2018	780	Dovre	1718 I "Rondane"	7510	61°55′10″N 9°42′30″E
171	Storbreatinden	2018	90	Lom	1518 II "Galdhøpiggen"	1030	61°35′14″N 8°7′33″E
172	Rauddalseggje, mid	2016	130	Lom	1517 I "Tyin"	1370	61°27′45″N 8°20′2″E
173	Storsmeden	2016	270	Dovre / Sel	1718 I "Rondane"	1980	61°54′34″N 9°44′22″E
174	Digerronden	2015	190	Dovre	1718 I "Rondane"	1660	61°57′5″N 9°49′52″E
175	Veslesmeden	2015	200	Dovre	1718 I "Rondane"	1200	61°54′59″N 9°45′25″E
176	Gråhø	2014	985	Lesja	1319 II "Tordsvatnet"	30410	62°4′17″N 8°6′36″E
177	Langeskavltinden	2014	200	Vang	1517 I "Tyin"	1560	61°25′41″N 8°10′45″E
178	Skredahøin	2004	380	Lesja	1419 I "Storskrymten"	2950	62°15′29″N 9°11′54″E
179	Nordre Svånåtinden	2004	50	Lesja	1419 I "Storskrymten"	1460	62°18′16″N 9°10′46″E
180	Skagsnebb	2003	50	Lom	1518 II "Galdhøpiggen"	990	61°36′22″N 8°8′49″E
181	Geiti wrongly placed on topo map	2002	70	Lom	1518 II "Galdhøpiggen"	810	61°33′50″N 8°9′41″E
182	Ringstinden, E	2002	130	Årdal / Luster	1517 IV "Hurrungane"	560	61°26′42″N 7°50′21″E
183	Bruri or Svånåkollen	2001	150	Lesja	1419 I "Storskrymten"	1360	62°17′50″N 9°12′2″E
184	Storbreahøe	2001	95	Lom	1518 II "Galdhøpiggen"	1080	61°35′22″N 8°8′44″E
185	Stølsnostinden, E1	2001	115	Årdal	1517 IV "Hurrungane"	560	61°23′43″N 8°4′51″E
186	Puttegga	1999	570	Fjord / Rauma	1319 III "Tafjord"		62°12′52″N 7°41′29″E
187	Sutningstinden	1997	350	Luster		2300	61°31′50″N 8°10′03″E
187	Steinbukampen	1997	120	Lom		1000	61°37′50″N 8°32′58″E
188	Steet	1996	190	Sel		1300	61°54′8″N 9°43′8″E
189	Lauvhøe (Store Lauvhøi)	1991	567	Lom		3700	61°44′23″N 8°32′34″E
190	Hjelledalstind	1989	695	Årdal		1710	61°22′06″N 8°05′53″E
191	Storskrymten	1985	610	Oppdal / Sunndal / Lesja		9000	62°22′29″N 9°03′42″E
192	Karitinden	1982	330	Skjåk / Fjord / Rauma		3900	62°11′05″N 7°44′04″E
193	Gjelhøi	1982	180	Skjåk		2900	61°46′19″N 7°55′22″E
194	Tordsnose	1975	685	Skjåk / Fjord	1319 III Tafjord	6000	62°8′32″N 7°39′12″E
195	Tundradalskyrkja	1970	380	Luster / Skjåk		3200	61°45′17″N 7°45′09″E
196	Mjølkedalstinden E	1970	150	Luster		800	61°27′33″N 8°15′02″E
197	Storegut	1968	450	Luster / Vang		2700	61°25′48″N 8°14′30″E
198	Vestre Høgvagltinden	1967	150	Luster		1000	61°39′51″N 8°14′55″E
199	Kleneggen	1964	1105	Molde		33000	62°23′48″N 8°12′21″E
200	Holåtindan	1964	70	Skjåk		6800	61°44′38″N 7°53′04″E
201	Skridulaupen	1962	719	Skjåk		22600	61°56′44″N 7°36′14″E
202	Skarvedalseggen	1960	324	Lesja / Skjåk		2500	62°02′54″N 8°04′52″E
201	Oksskolten	1916	1380	Hemnes			66°00′52″N 14°20′17″E

== Cross tabulation of number of peaks by height and primary factor ==
Cross tabulation of Norwegian peaks by height and primary factor (topographic prominence)
Height	>2400 m	>2300 m	>2200 m	>2100 m	>2000 m
Prime factor					
>500 m	3	5	13	22	29
>250 m	3	11	23	42	62
>100 m	3	19	38	73	121
>50 m	3	21	54	105	172
>30 m	3	22	60	125	209
>10 m	3	28	77	170	291

== See also ==
- List of highest points of Norwegian counties
- List of mountains in Norway by prominence
