= Fossbergom =

Village in Lom Municipality, Norway

Fossbergom Lom
- Village
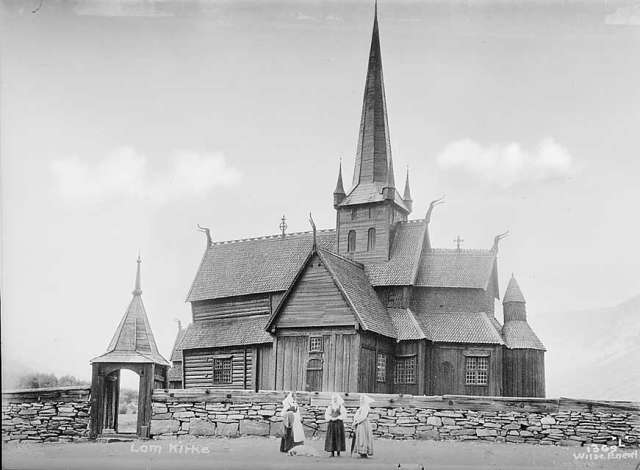
- View of the old Lom Stave Church
- Interactive map of Fossbergom; Lom
- Location within Innlandet Location within Norway
- Coordinates: 61.83772°N 8.56842°E
- Country: Norway
- Region: Eastern Norway
- County: Innlandet
- District: Gudbrandsdalen
- Municipality: Lom Municipality

Area
  - Total: 1.47 km^{2} (0.57 sq mi)
- Elevation: 379 m (1,243 ft)

Population (2024)
  - Total: 839
  - Density: 571/km^{2} (1,480/sq mi)
- Time zone: UTC+01:00 (CET)
  - Summer (DST): UTC+02:00 (CEST)
- Post Code: 2686 Lom

Fossbergom or Lom is the administrative centre of Lom Municipality in Innlandet county, Norway. The village is located on the south shore of the river Otta, at the north end of the Bøverdal valley. The 1.47-square-kilometre (360-acre) village has a population (2024) of 839 and a population density of 571 inhabitants per square kilometre (1,480/sq mi). Fossbergom is the main population centre for the municipality and a large portion of the residents work in the tourism, commerce, and the service sectors.

== Geography ==
Bøverdalen, a valley in the western part of Lom Municipality, stretches from Fossbergom to the Sogn area in Western Norway. Fossbergom is situated where the river Bøvra falls over Prestfossen waterfall into the river Otta.

== Transportation ==
Fossbergom is located on a main transportation junction with roads leading to Stryn (Rv.15 Strynefjellsvegen road), Sogn (Rv. 55 Sognefjellsvegen road), and Eastern Norway. During the summer months, this is an important road junction connecting Eastern and Western Norway. The Sognefjellsvegen road is closed from October/November until about the end of April/beginning of May. Fossbergom is also accessible by taking the train from Trondheim or Oslo to Otta, and then traveling the remaining 60 kilometres (37 mi) by bus.

== Attractions ==
The Fossheim Hotel (Norwegian: Fossheim Turisthotell) first opened in 1897. It is a two-story log building with an attic, kitchen, two living rooms, and seven bedrooms. The site was run both as a farm and as a hotel until World War I, after which cars became the more common means of transportation. In the 1950s and 1960s, several renovations were carried out in order to satisfy demands made by new groups of tourists. Today, the main building has 26 double rooms and 3 single rooms and a connecting restaurant. The new annex building was also built to satisfy foreign visitors.

The Fossheim Stone Center geological museum (Norwegian: Fossheim Steinsenter) has one of the larger collections of minerals and precious stones in the country.

The thirteenth-century Lom Stave Church (Norwegian: Lom Stavkyrkje), which is one of the biggest stave churches in Norway, is located here. The church was built in the 12th century and restored in the 17th century.
