= Vågåmo =

Village in Vågå Municipality, Norway

- Village
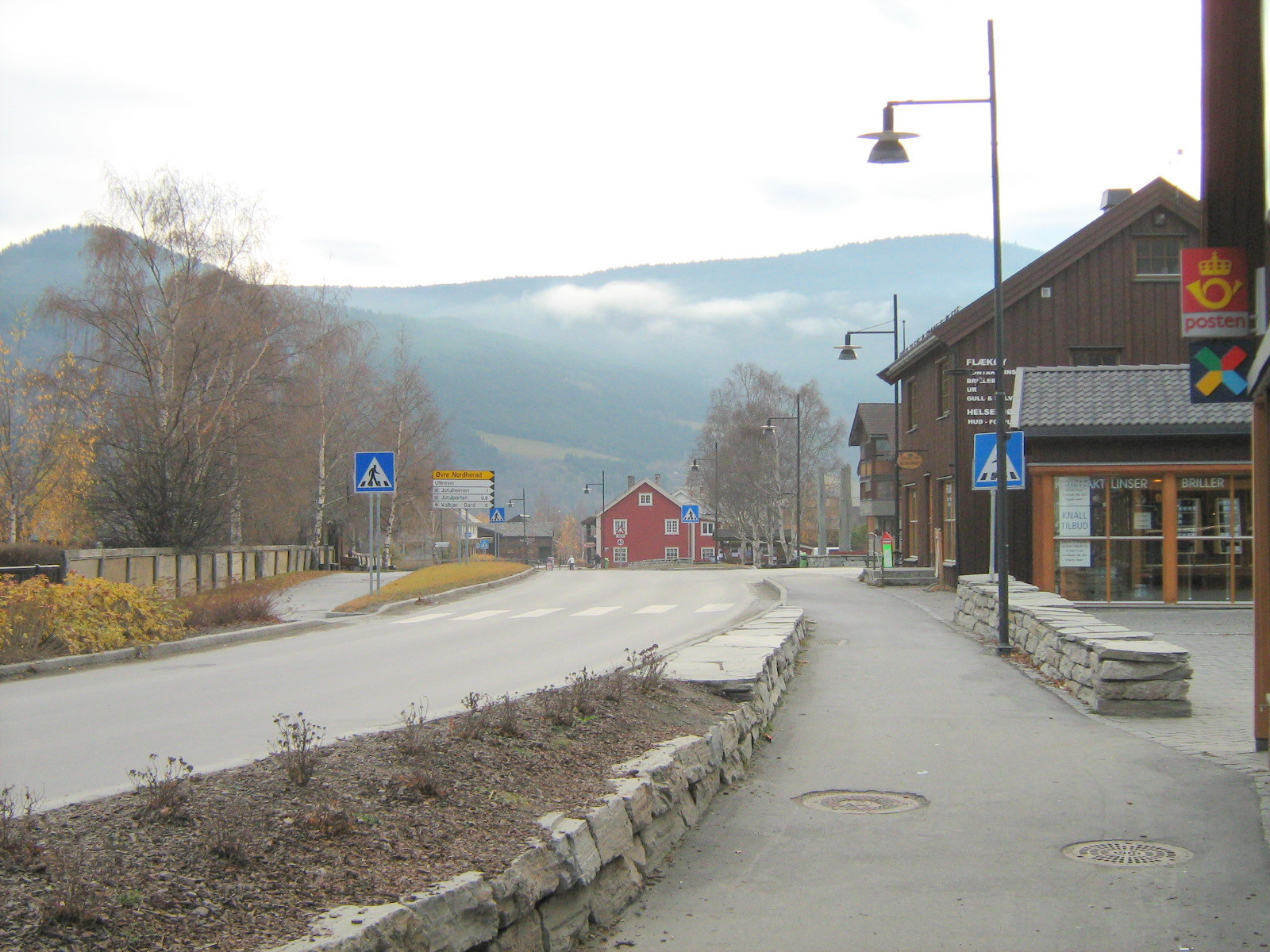
- View of the village, looking down the main street
- Interactive map of Vågåmo
- Location within Innlandet Location within Norway
- Coordinates: 61.87504°N 9.09667°E
- Country: Norway
- Region: Eastern Norway
- County: Innlandet
- District: Gudbrandsdalen
- Municipality: Vågå Municipality

Area
  - Total: 1.68 km^{2} (0.65 sq mi)
- Elevation: 375 m (1,230 ft)

Population (2024)
  - Total: 1,471
  - Density: 876/km^{2} (2,270/sq mi)
- Time zone: UTC+01:00 (CET)
  - Summer (DST): UTC+02:00 (CEST)
- Post Code: 2680 Vågå

Vågåmo is the administrative centre of Vågå Municipality in Innlandet county, Norway. The village is located along the Otta River, at the eastern end of the lake Vågåvatn in the Ottadalen valley. The Norwegian National Road 15 passes through the village. The 1.68-square-kilometre (420-acre) village has a population (2024) of 1,471 and a population density of 876 inhabitants per square kilometre (2,270/sq mi).

Vågåmo is home to a local museum, the Jutulheimen Bygdemuseum, and to the historical Klones farm which is also the location of the Nord-Gudbrandsdalen Upper Secondary School (videregående skole) which specializes in agriculture. The Klones farm dates back to the 15th century and has been the location of the school since 1919. There are also many horses and a store named Jutulbue there. Vågå Church is located in the village.
