= Norge 1:50000 =

Norwegian topographical map series

Example maps

Norge 1:50 000 (Norway 1:50 000) is the main series of 727 topographical maps in 1:50,000 scale that cover the entire mainland area of Norway and proximate islands. The civilian designation is Norway 1:50 000 and the military designation is M711.

The military series includes 727 maps. The production of the map series was begun in 1952, and the series was completed for whole Norway in 1988. The maps are subject to ongoing revision, and about 60 maps are issued in new release each year. From 2012, a civilian series printed on plastic sheets on both sides and in a larger format were produced. Each map sheet is now equivalent to four different maps in the military series. The civilian series include 212 different maps.

Statens kartverk (Norwegian Mapping Authority), the governmental cartography office, is responsible for updating and maintaining the maps. The geodetic datum of the series is EUREF89 (European Reference Frame 1989), which is approximately equal to WGS84 (World Geodetic System 1984). The maps are in full color, complete with place names and political boundaries. Contour line spacing is 20 meters (66 ft), and the maps are usable for hiking and other navigation.

The maps are available for sale in most bookstores, though it may vary how complete their collection is.
