= Lom Municipality (Norway) =

Municipality in Innlandet, Norway

Lom Municipality Lom kommune
- Municipality
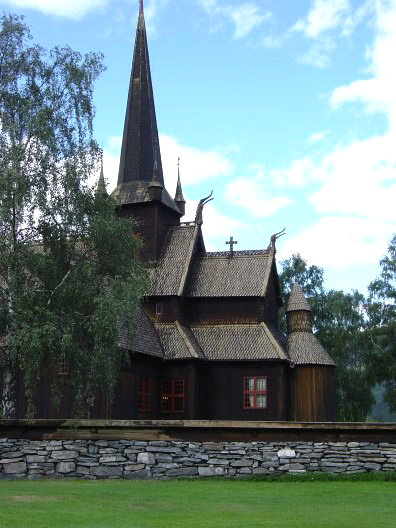
- View of the local Lom Stave Church

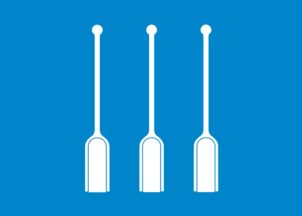
- Flag Coat of arms

- Innlandet within Norway

- Lom within Innlandet
- Coordinates: 61°48′39″N 8°38′21″E
- Country: Norway
- County: Innlandet
- District: Gudbrandsdalen
- Established: 1 Jan 1838
  - Created as: Formannskapsdistrikt
- Administrative centre: Fossbergom

Government
  - Mayor (2023): Kristian Frisvold (LL)

Area
  - Total: 1,968.55 km^{2} (760.06 sq mi)
  - Land: 1,887.24 km^{2} (728.67 sq mi)
  - Water: 81.31 km^{2} (31.39 sq mi) 4.1%
  - Rank: #38 in Norway
- Highest elevation: 2,468.53 m (8,098.9 ft)

Population (2025)
  - Total: 2,215
  - Rank: #271 in Norway
  - Density: 1.1/km^{2} (2.8/sq mi)
  - Change (10 years): ▼ −6.3%
- Demonym: Lomvær

Official language
  - Norwegian form: Nynorsk
- Time zone: UTC+01:00 (CET)
  - Summer (DST): UTC+02:00 (CEST)
- ISO 3166 code: NO-3434
- Website: Official website

Lom is a municipality in Innlandet county, Norway. It is located in the traditional district of Gudbrandsdal. The administrative centre of the municipality is the village of Fossbergom. Another village area in Lom is Elvesæter.

The 1,969-square-kilometre (760 sq mi) municipality is the 38th largest by area out of the 357 municipalities in Norway. Lom Municipality is the 271st most populous municipality in Norway with a population of 2,215. The municipality's population density is 1.1 inhabitants per square kilometre (2.8/sq mi) and its population has decreased by 6.3% over the previous 10-year period.

Lom Municipality is famous for its extensive history. Lom Stave Church, one of the few remaining stave churches in Norway, is located here. It's also notable for being located in the midst of several of the highest mountains in Northern Europe.

== General information ==
The prestegjeld (parish) of Lom was established as a municipality on 1 January 1838 (see formannskapsdistrikt law). On 1 January 1866, the municipality was divided. The western district (population: 2,691) became the new Skiaker Municipality and the eastern district (population: 3,299) remained as a smaller Lom Municipality. The boundaries of Lom Municipality have not changed since that time.

Historically, the municipality was part of the old Oppland county. On 1 January 2020, the municipality became a part of the newly-formed Innlandet county (after Hedmark and Oppland counties were merged).

=== Name ===
The municipality (originally the parish) is named after the old Lom farm since the first Lom Stave Church was built there. The Old Norse form of the name was Lóar (nominative case) and Lóm (dative case). The name is derived from the plural form of ló which means "clearing" or "meadow".

=== Coat of arms ===
The coat of arms was granted on 6 February 1987. The official blazon is "Azure, three shovels argent palewise in fess" (Norwegian: På blå grunn tre sølv skjeltrekor). This means the arms have a blue field (background) and the charge is three vertical spades lined up horizontally. The charge has a tincture of argent which means it is commonly colored white, but if it is made out of metal, then silver is used. These spades (Norwegian: skjeltrekor) were historically used to scoop water from the irrigation channels typical for the area. The area is one of the driest in Norway, but the soil is good for agriculture. It thus needs irrigation. In the 17th century, a system was developed in which melting water from the mountains was transported to the area using wooden channels or aqueducts. The water was further divided using irrigation channels. The arms were designed by Einar H. Skjervold. The municipal flag has the same design as the coat of arms.

=== Churches ===
The Church of Norway has three parishes (sokn) within Lom Municipality. It is part of the Nord-Gudbrandsdal prosti (deanery) in the Diocese of Hamar.

Churches in Lom Municipality
Parish (sokn)	Church name	Location of the church	Year built
Bøverdalen	Bøverdal Church	Galdesanden (Bøverdalen)	1864
Garmo	Garmo Church	Garmo	1879
Lom	Lom Stave Church	Fossbergom	c. 1160

== History ==
Number of minorities (1st and 2nd generation) in Lom by country of origin in 2017
Ancestry	Number
Somalia	31
Germany	18
Eritrea	17

An ancient trade route passed up from Sunnmøre through Lom and Skjåk and down the Gudbrandsdalen valley into Eastern Norway. The trade consisted of fish and salt heading inland, and grain heading to the coast.

The Saga of Olaf Haraldson relates that St. Olaf commented as he first looked down on Lom, "What a pity to have to lay waste to such a beautiful valley." In the face of such a clear motivation, the residents of the valley converted to Christianity (it has since been a recurring discussion whether he looked towards the present-day Lom Municipality or the neighbouring Skjåk Municipality since at the time both were considered to be Lom). St. Olafs-stuggu, a building where St. Olaf is reported to have spent a night in 1021, can still be found here. The building is part of the Presthaugen District Museum.

Lom Stave Church, which is located in Fossbergom, is believed to have been built in 1158, making 2008 the 850th anniversary. It was enlarged in 1634, with further addition of two naves in 1667. It is believed that the church was originally surrounded by a circumambulatory passage, like many other Norwegian stave churches, but that this passage was removed when the two side wings were added. A few Runic inscriptions can still be seen in the church. The church also contains numerous paintings from the 17th and 18th centuries with religious motifs. Many of the paintings were made by local artist Eggert Munch, a distant relation of the famous Edvard Munch. The church also contains numerous examples of local woodcarving, as seen in the elaborate acanthus scrolls adorning the pulpit. Carved dragon figures on the roof are old symbols of protection against evil. It is still in use as the local church.

The Garmo Stave Church, which was built around 1150, has been relocated from Lom Municipality and is now at Maihaugen in Lillehammer Municipality. It was replaced with a new Garmo Church.

During the 1940 Norwegian Campaign German prisoners of war were kept by the Norwegian Army at Lom prisoner of war camp. Lom was bombed twice by the German Luftwaffe in April 1940.

== Government ==
Lom Municipality is responsible for primary education (through 10th grade), outpatient health services, senior citizen services, welfare and other social services, zoning, economic development, and municipal roads and utilities. The municipality is governed by a municipal council of directly elected representatives. The mayor is indirectly elected by a vote of the municipal council. The municipality is under the jurisdiction of the Gudbrandsdal District Court and the Eidsivating Court of Appeal.

=== Municipal council ===
The municipal council (Kommunestyre) of Lom Municipality is made up of 17 representatives that are elected to four year terms. The tables below show the current and historical composition of the council by political party.

Lom kommunestyre 2023–2027
Party name (in Nynorsk)	Number of representatives
Labour Party (Arbeidarpartiet)	3
Centre Party (Senterpartiet)	4
Lom List (Lomslista)	4
Local List (Bygdalista)	5
Cross-party List (Tverrpolitisk liste)	1
Total number of members:	17

Lom kommunestyre 2019–2023
Party name (in Nynorsk)	Number of representatives
Labour Party (Arbeidarpartiet)	4
Centre Party (Senterpartiet)	7
Lom List (Lomslista)	4
Local List (Bygdalista)	2
Total number of members:	17

Lom kommunestyre 2015–2019
Party name (in Nynorsk)	Number of representatives
Labour Party (Arbeidarpartiet)	4
Centre Party (Senterpartiet)	8
Lom List (Lomslista)	2
Local List (Bygdalista)	3
Total number of members:	17

Lom kommunestyre 2011–2015
Party name (in Nynorsk)	Number of representatives
Labour Party (Arbeidarpartiet)	5
Centre Party (Senterpartiet)	6
Lom List (Lomslista)	3
Local List in Lom (Bygdalista i Lom)	3
Total number of members:	17

Lom kommunestyre 2007–2011
Party name (in Nynorsk)	Number of representatives
Labour Party (Arbeidarpartiet)	3
Centre Party (Senterpartiet)	11
Local list in Lom (Bygdelista i Lom)	3
Total number of members:	17

Lom kommunestyre 2003–2007
Party name (in Nynorsk)	Number of representatives
Labour Party (Arbeidarpartiet)	5
Centre Party (Senterpartiet)	9
Local list in Lom (Bygdelista i Lom)	3
Total number of members:	17

Lom kommunestyre 1999–2003
Party name (in Nynorsk)	Number of representatives
Labour Party (Arbeidarpartiet)	8
Centre Party (Senterpartiet)	6
Local list for cross-party cooperation (Bygdalista for tverrpolitisk samarbeid)	7
Total number of members:	21

Lom kommunestyre 1995–1999
Party name (in Nynorsk)	Number of representatives
Labour Party (Arbeidarpartiet)	11
Centre Party (Senterpartiet)	8
Local list for cross-party cooperation (Bygdalista for tverrpolitisk samarbeid)	2
Total number of members:	21

Lom kommunestyre 1991–1995
Party name (in Nynorsk)	Number of representatives
Labour Party (Arbeidarpartiet)	10
Conservative Party (Høgre)	1
Centre Party (Senterpartiet)	7
Local list for cross-party cooperation (Bygdalista for tverrpolitisk samarbeid)	3
Total number of members:	21

Lom kommunestyre 1987–1991
Party name (in Nynorsk)	Number of representatives
Labour Party (Arbeidarpartiet)	11
Conservative Party (Høgre)	2
Centre Party (Senterpartiet)	4
Local list for cross-party cooperation (Bygdalista for tverrpolitisk samarbeid)	4
Total number of members:	21

Lom kommunestyre 1983–1987
Party name (in Nynorsk)	Number of representatives
Labour Party (Arbeidarpartiet)	11
Conservative Party (Høgre)	2
Centre Party (Senterpartiet)	6
Local list for cross-party cooperation (Bygdalista for tverrpolitisk samarbeid)	2
Total number of members:	21

Lom kommunestyre 1979–1983
Party name (in Nynorsk)	Number of representatives
Labour Party (Arbeidarpartiet)	9
Conservative Party (Høgre)	2
Centre Party (Senterpartiet)	7
Local list for cross-party cooperation (Bygdalista for tverrpolitisk samarbeid)	3
Total number of members:	21

Lom kommunestyre 1975–1979
Party name (in Nynorsk)	Number of representatives
Labour Party (Arbeidarpartiet)	10
Centre Party (Senterpartiet)	7
Local list for cross-party cooperation (Bygdalista for tverrpolitisk samarbeid)	4
Total number of members:	21

Lom kommunestyre 1971–1975
Party name (in Nynorsk)	Number of representatives
Labour Party (Arbeidarpartiet)	11
Joint List(s) of Non-Socialist Parties (Borgarlege Felleslister)	10
Total number of members:	21

Lom kommunestyre 1967–1971
Party name (in Nynorsk)	Number of representatives
Labour Party (Arbeidarpartiet)	11
Joint List(s) of Non-Socialist Parties (Borgarlege Felleslister)	10
Total number of members:	21

Lom kommunestyre 1963–1967
Party name (in Nynorsk)	Number of representatives
Labour Party (Arbeidarpartiet)	11
Centre Party (Senterpartiet)	7
Joint List(s) of Non-Socialist Parties (Borgarlege Felleslister)	3
Total number of members:	21

Lom heradsstyre 1959–1963
Party name (in Nynorsk)	Number of representatives
Labour Party (Arbeidarpartiet)	13
Centre Party (Senterpartiet)	5
Joint List(s) of Non-Socialist Parties (Borgarlege Felleslister)	3
Total number of members:	21

Lom heradsstyre 1955–1959
Party name (in Nynorsk)	Number of representatives
Labour Party (Arbeidarpartiet)	12
Joint List(s) of Non-Socialist Parties (Borgarlege Felleslister)	9
Total number of members:	21

Lom heradsstyre 1951–1955
Party name (in Nynorsk)	Number of representatives
Labour Party (Arbeidarpartiet)	12
Joint List(s) of Non-Socialist Parties (Borgarlege Felleslister)	12
Total number of members:	24

Lom heradsstyre 1947–1951
Party name (in Nynorsk)	Number of representatives
Labour Party (Arbeidarpartiet)	13
Farmers' Party (Bondepartiet)	3
Joint List(s) of Non-Socialist Parties (Borgarlege Felleslister)	8
Total number of members:	24

Lom heradsstyre 1945–1947
Party name (in Nynorsk)	Number of representatives
Labour Party (Arbeidarpartiet)	12
Local List(s) (Lokale lister)	12
Total number of members:	24

Lom heradsstyre 1937–1941*
Party name (in Nynorsk)	Number of representatives
Labour Party (Arbeidarpartiet)	14
Farmers' Party (Bondepartiet)	9
Local List(s) (Lokale lister)	1
Total number of members:	24
Note: Due to the German occupation of Norway during World War II, no elections were held for new municipal councils until after the war ended in 1945.

=== Mayors ===
The mayor (Nynorsk: ordførar) of Lom Municipality is the political leader of the municipality and the chairperson of the municipal council. Here is a list of people who have held this position:

- 1838–1844: Ole J. Staff
- 1845–1848: Mr. Strømsøe
- 1848–1851: Ole J. Staff
- 1851–1853: Ola G. Kvåle
- 1854–1857: Julius Aars
- 1858–1861: Ola G. Kvåle
- 1862–1865: Rolv S. Blakar
- 1866–1869: Ola G. Kvåle
- 1870–1873: Rolv S. Blakar
- 1874–1879: Gunder Lindsøe
- 1880–1889: Sevald R. Blakar
- 1890–1893: Rasmus K. Nordal
- 1894–1897: Gregor Kvåle
- 1898–1901: Olav O. Aukrust
- 1902–1907: Rasmus K. Nordal
- 1908–1910: Olav O. Aukrust
- 1911–1913: Kristen Kjæstad
- 1914–1916: Rasmus K. Nordal
- 1917–1922: Rasmus Elvesæter
- 1923–1925: Halvor Offigsbø
- 1926–1928: Rasmus Elvesæter
- 1929–1931: Hallvard Holm
- 1932–1934: Jonas Galde
- 1935–1940: Hans Bruøygard
- 1941–1945: Paal O. Aukrust (NS)
- 1945–1945: Hans Bruøygard (Ap)
- 1946–1951: Jo Kveum (Ap)
- 1952–1955: Paal O. Aukrust (Bp)
- 1955–1969: Jo Kveum (Ap)
- 1970–1971: Steinar Bruøygard (Ap)
- 1972–1975: Jon P. Kolden (Ap)
- 1976–1983: Kristen Brandsar (Sp)
- 1984–1987: Steinar Bruøygard (Ap)
- 1988–1991: Jarmund Øyen (Ap)
- 1992–1995: Erik Frisvold (Sp)
- 1996–1999: Jarmund Øyen (Ap)
- 1999–2003: Magnar Mundhjeld (LL)
- 2003–2011: Simen Bjørgen (Sp)
- 2011–2023: Bjarne Eiolf Holø (Sp)
- 2023–present: Kristian Frisvold (LL)

== Geography ==
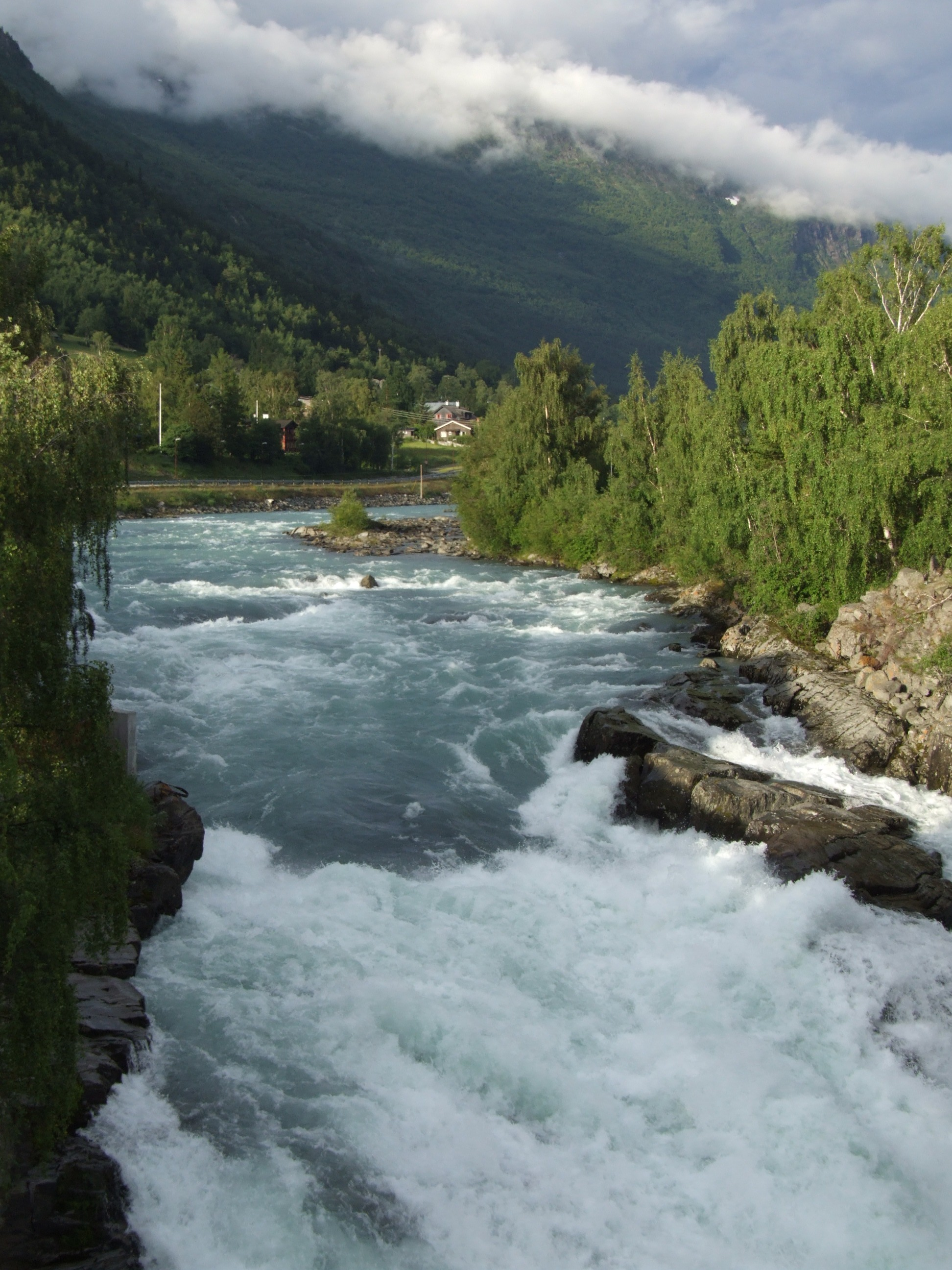
River Bøvra in Lom

Lom Municipality is the "gateway" to the Jotunheimen Mountains and to Jotunheim National Park. The municipality contains the two highest peaks in all of Norway, Galdhøpiggen at 2,468.53 metres (8,098.9 ft) and Glittertinden at 2,464 metres (8,084 ft), which both lie within the park. Galdhøpiggen is the highest mountain in the municipality (and all of Scandinavia).

Lom Municipality is bordered on the northwest by Skjåk Municipality, in the north by Lesja Municipality, in the east and southeast by Vågå Municipality, in the south by Vang Municipality all in Innlandet county. In the southwest, it is bordered by Luster Municipality in Vestland county. The main village of Fossbergom is situated in the Ottadalen valley at an elevation of 382 metres (1,253 ft) above sea level.

=== Climate ===
The climate is very continental by Norwegian standards. Average annual precipitation (in Fossbergom) is 321 millimetres (12.6 in), and monthly 24-hr averages range from −10 °C (14 °F) in January to 14 °C (57 °F) in July. Summers are often sunny with daytime temperatures typically ranging from 14 °C (57 °F) to 25 °C (77 °F). The large mountain areas in Lom are much colder and have more precipitation; snowy weather is possible even in summer at altitudes above 2,000 metres (6,600 ft). Agriculture has for centuries used irrigation.

== Economy ==
Agriculture has long been important in Lom. The natural environment and history of this mountainous region also make Lom Municipality a tourist destination.

== Notable people ==
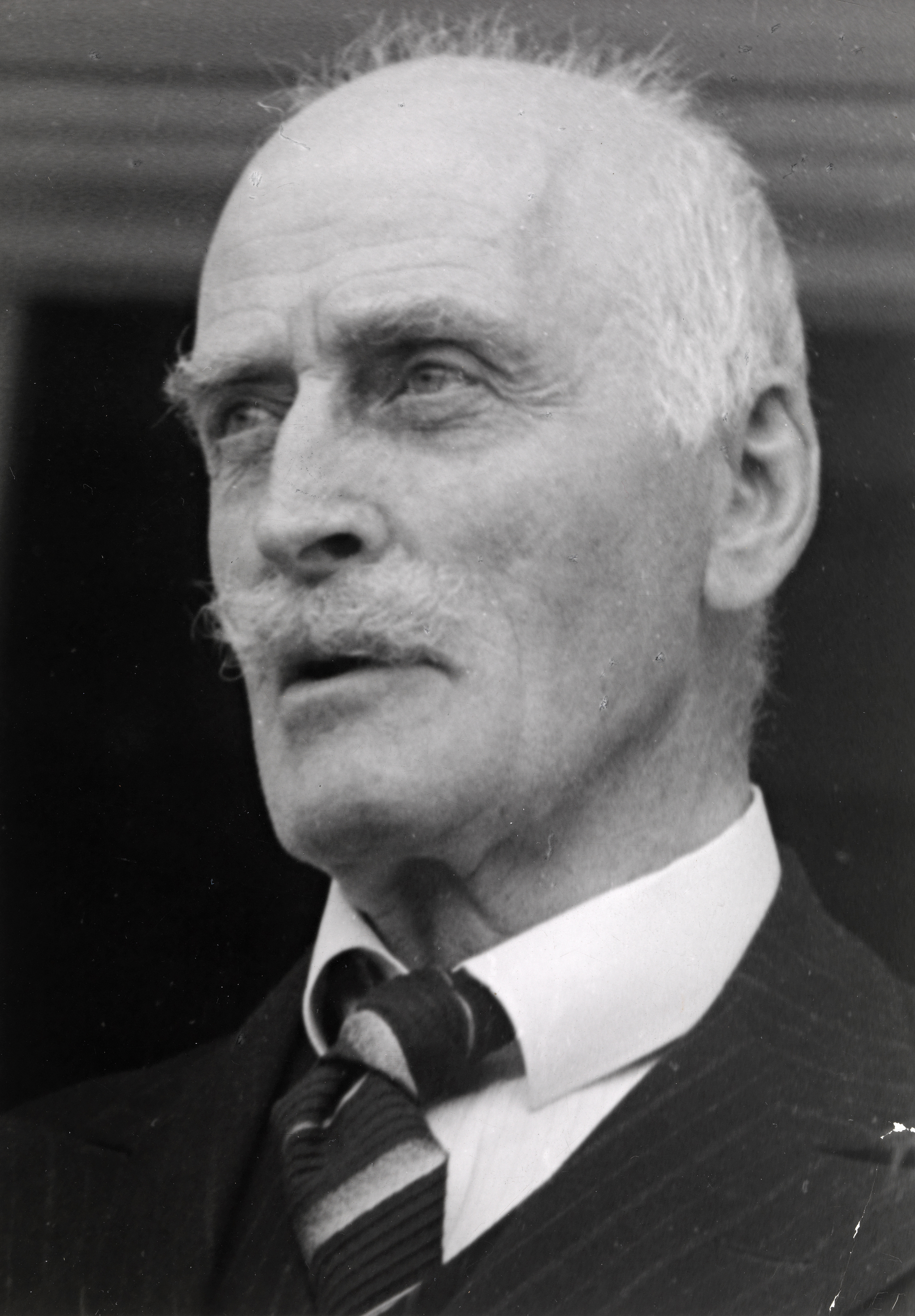
Knut Hamsun, 1939

- Jakob Klukstad (1705 in Lom – 1773), a wood carver and painter
- Knut Hamsun (1859 in Lom – 1952), a novelist and winner of the 1920 Nobel Prize in Literature; his childhood home can be seen 12 kilometres (7.5 mi) east of Lom
- Erland Frisvold (1877 in Lom – 1971), a Norwegian politician and Army colonel
- Olav Aukrust (1883 in Lom – 1929), a poet and teacher who used Nynorsk; there is a memorial to him near the church
- Jørgine Boomer (1887 in Bøverdalen – 1971), a Norwegian-American rags-to-riches hotel manager
- Carl Gustav Sparre Olsen (1903–1984), a violinist and composer, buried in Lom
- Tor Jonsson (1916 in Lom – 1951), a poet and author and winner of The Norwegian Critics Prize for Literature; his childhood cottage is on the sunny-side road Solsidevegen
- Anstein Gjengedal (born 1944 in Lom), the Chief of Police of Oslo from 2000 to 2012
- Arne Brimi (born 1957), a chef and food writer
- Vidar Johansen (born 1953), a jazz musician, music arranger and composer; he lives on a mountain farm in Lom since 2015
- Morten Schakenda (1966 – 2022), a cook

== Attractions ==
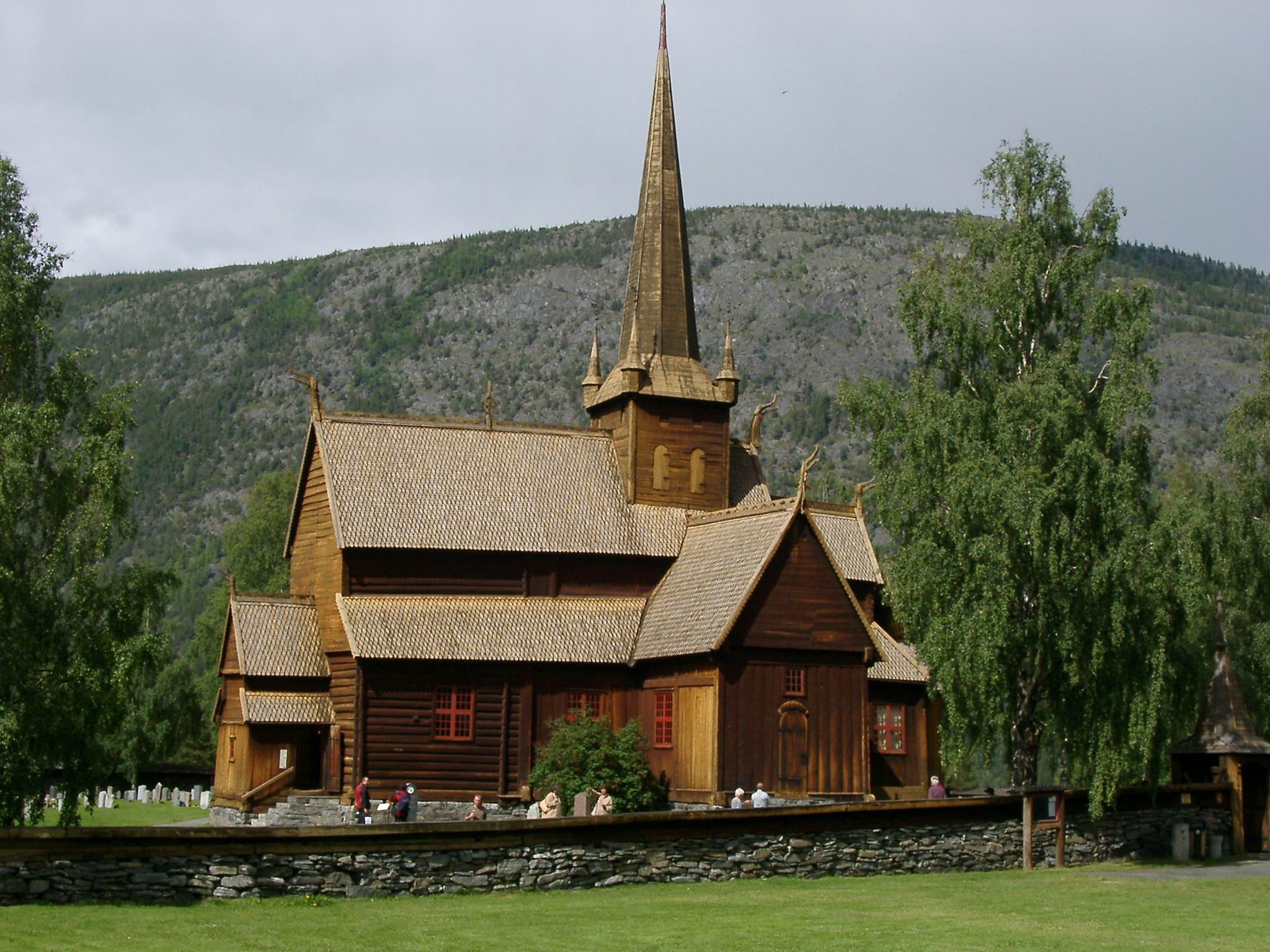
Lom Stave Church

- Lom Stave Church
- Jotunheim National Park
- Norsk Fjellmuseum, the Norwegian Mountain Museum and information center for Jotunheim National Park
- Lom District Museum in Presthaugen – an open-air museum
- Fossheim Stone/Mineral Center
- County Route 55 (known as the Sognefjellsvegen) from Lom over the Sognefjell (the highest mountain pass in Northern Europe)
- Knut Hamsun's cottage located at Garmostrædet
- The Sagasøyla Column in Bøverdalen
- Steinahøfjellet, 1,711 m (5,614 ft)
- Lom's irrigation canals

== See also ==
- Bjørn Turtums gammeldansorkester
