= Smådalshøe =

Mountain in Innlandet, Norway

- Interactive map of the mountain

Highest point
- Elevation: 1,889 m (6,198 ft)
- Prominence: 148 m (486 ft)
- Parent peak: Glittertinden
- Isolation: 1.9 km (1.2 mi)
- Coordinates: 61°41′54″N 8°40′27″E

Geography
- Location: Innlandet, Norway
- Parent range: Jotunheimen
- Topo map: 1618 III Glittertinden

Smådalshøe is a mountain in Lom Municipality in Innlandet county, Norway. The 1,889-metre (6,198 ft) tall mountain is located in the Jotunheimen mountains within Jotunheimen National Park. The mountain sits about 16 kilometres (9.9 mi) south of the village of Fossbergom and about 32 kilometres (20 mi) southwest of the village of Vågåmo. The mountain is surrounded by several other notable mountains including Kvitingskjølen to the northeast; Heranoshøi to the east; Hindnubben and Stornubben to the southeast; Veslekjølen and Austre Hestlægerhøe to the south; Glittertinden, Trollsteineggje, and Trollsteinrundhøe to the southwest; Svartholshøe, Gråhøe, and Store Trollhøin to the west, and Finnshalspiggen, Lauvhøe, and Eisteinhovde to the northwest.

== See also ==
- List of mountains of Norway
