= Gråhøe (Lom) =

Mountain in Innlandet, Norway

- Gråhøi (unofficial)
- Interactive map of the mountain

Highest point
- Elevation: 2,154 m (7,067 ft)
- Prominence: 54 m (177 ft)
- Parent peak: Nørdre Trollsteinhøe
- Isolation: 0.928 km (0.577 mi)
- Coordinates: 61°41′24″N 8°33′43″E

Geography
- Location: Innlandet, Norway
- Parent range: Jotunheimen
- Topo map: 1618 III Glittertinden

Gråhøe is a mountain in Lom Municipality in Innlandet county, Norway. The 2,154-metre (7,067 ft) tall mountain is located in the Jotunheimen mountains within Jotunheimen National Park. The mountain sits about 16 kilometres (9.9 mi) south of the village of Fossbergom and about 36 kilometres (22 mi) southwest of the village of Vågåmo. The mountain is surrounded by several other notable mountains including Finnshalspiggen to the north; Smådalshøe and Nørdre Trollsteinhøe to the east; Grotbreahesten to the southeast; Svartholshøe, Trollsteinrundhøe, Trollsteineggi, and Glittertinden to the south; and Lauvhøe to the northwest.

== See also ==
- List of mountains of Norway
