= Gråvåhøe =

Mountain in Innlandet, Norway

- Gråvåhøi / Gråvåhøa
- Interactive map of the mountain

Highest point
- Elevation: 1,762 m (5,781 ft)
- Prominence: 142 m (466 ft)
- Parent peak: Kvitingskjølen
- Isolation: 2.6 km (1.6 mi)
- Coordinates: 61°47′50″N 8°47′00″E

Geography
- Location: Innlandet, Norway
- Parent range: Jotunheimen

Gråvåhøe is a mountain in Lom Municipality in Innlandet county, Norway. The 1,762-metre (5,781 ft) tall mountain is located in the Jotunheimen mountains. The mountain sits about 12 kilometres (7.5 mi) southeast of the village of Fossbergom and about 20 kilometres (12 mi) southwest of the village of Vågåmo. The mountain is surrounded by several other notable mountains including Skarvhøe to the northwest; Veslekjølen and Ilvetjørnhøe to the west; Kvitingskjølen to the southwest; and Grjothovden, Saukampen, and Liaberget to the southeast.

== See also ==
- List of mountains of Norway
