= Veopallan =

Mountain in Innlandet, Norway

- Interactive map of the mountain

Highest point
- Elevation: 1,847 m (6,060 ft)
- Prominence: 196 m (643 ft)
- Parent peak: Glittertinden
- Isolation: 1.4 km (0.87 mi)
- Coordinates: 61°36′09″N 8°32′45″E

Geography
- Location: Innlandet, Norway
- Parent range: Jotunheimen
- Topo map: 1618 III Glittertinden

Veopallan is a mountain in Lom Municipality in Innlandet county, Norway. The 1,847-metre (6,060 ft) tall mountain is located in the Jotunheimen mountains within Jotunheimen National Park. The mountain sits about 25 kilometres (16 mi) south of the village of Fossbergom and about 40 kilometres (25 mi) southwest of the village of Vågåmo. The mountain is surrounded by several other notable mountains including Veotinden to the south, Styggehøi and Vestre Hestlægerhøe to the southeast, Austre Hestlægerhøe and Nautgardstinden to the east, Glittertinden and Steinbukampen to the north, Galdhøpiggen to the west, and Veobreahesten to the southwest.

== See also ==
- List of mountains of Norway
