= Steinbukampen =

Mountain in Innlandet, Norway

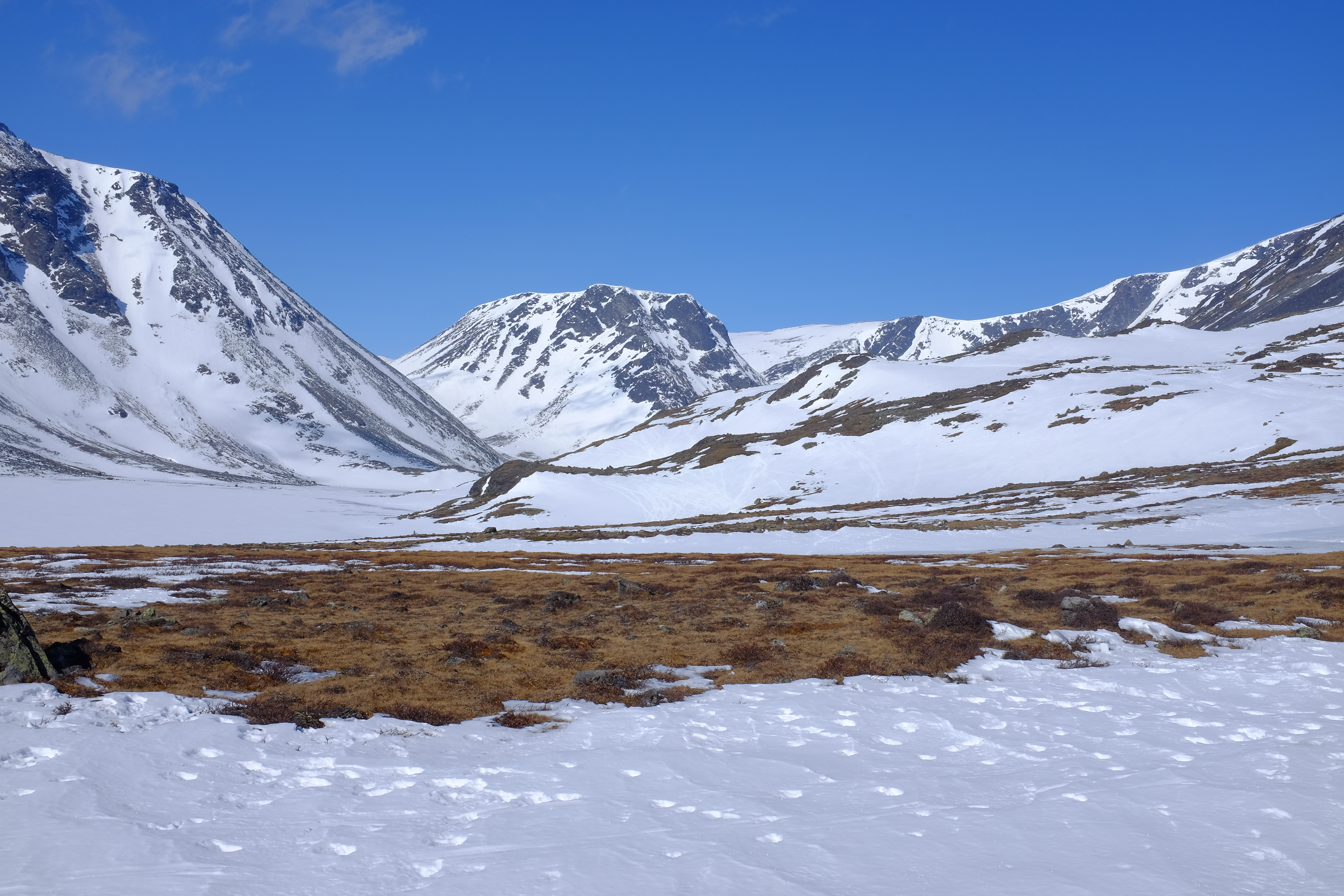
- View of the mountain (centre with the flat top)

Highest point
- Elevation: 1,997 m (6,552 ft)
- Prominence: 120 m (390 ft)
- Parent peak: Glittertinden
- Isolation: 0.923 km (0.574 mi) to Ryggehøe
- Coordinates: 61°37′50″N 8°32′59″E

Geography
- Interactive map of the mountain
- Location: Innlandet, Norway
- Parent range: Jotunheimen
- Topo map: 1618 III Glittertinden

Steinbukampen is a mountain in Lom Municipality in Innlandet county, Norway. The 1,997-metre (6,552 ft) tall mountain is located in the Jotunheimen mountains within Jotunheimen National Park. The mountain sits about 24 kilometres (15 mi) south of the village of Fossbergom and about 40 kilometres (25 mi) southwest of the village of Vågåmo. The mountain is surrounded by several other notable mountains including Veopallan and Veotinden to the south, Styggehøi and Vestre Hestlægerhøe to the southeast, Nautgardstinden to the east, Glittertinden to the north, Galdhøpiggen to the west, and Veobreahesten to the southwest.

== See also ==
- List of mountains of Norway
