= Svartholshøe =

Mountain in Innlandet, Norway

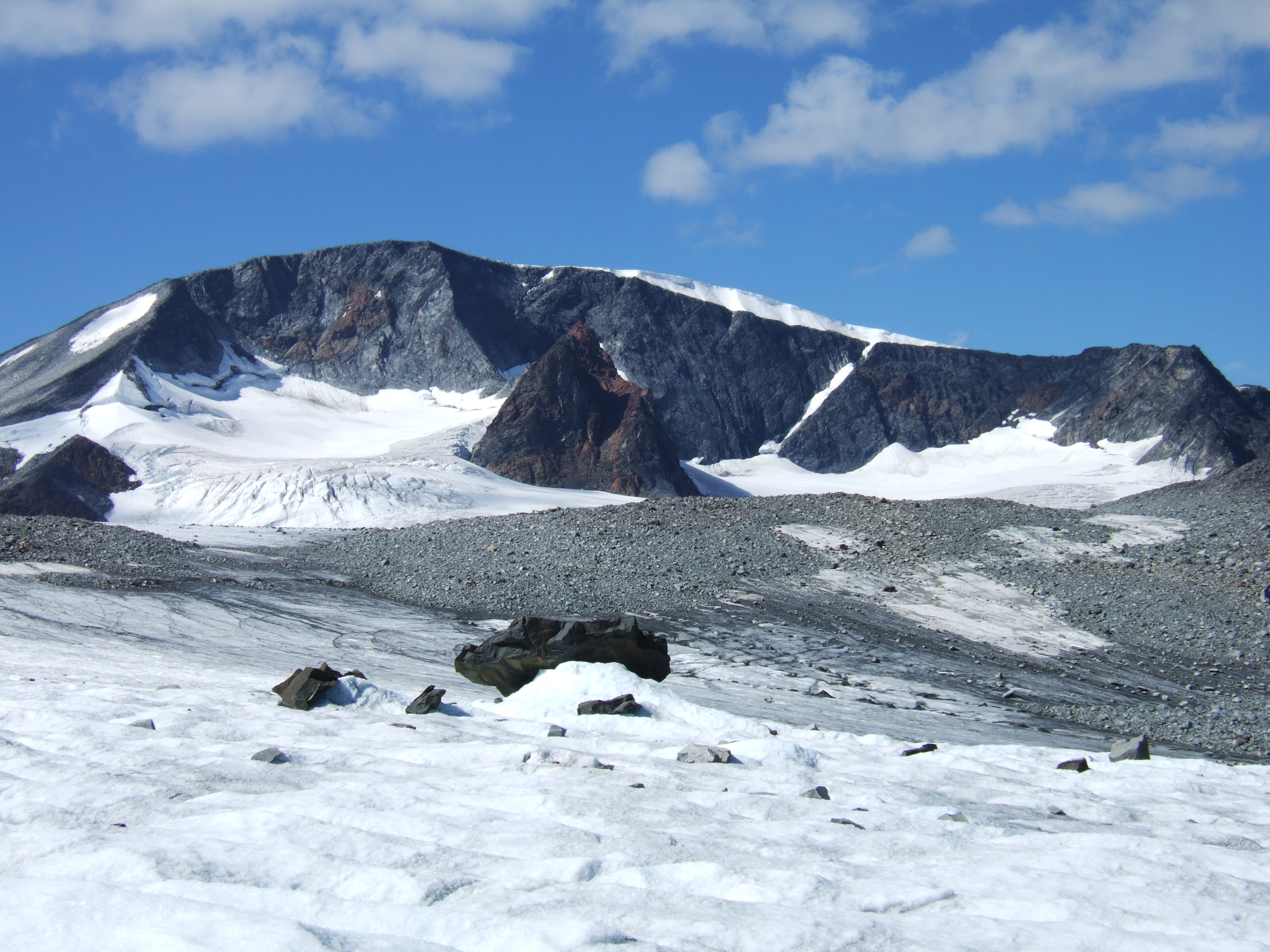

Highest point
- Elevation: 2,067 m (6,781 ft)
- Prominence: 60 m (200 ft)
- Parent peak: Glittertinden
- Isolation: 0.447 km (0.278 mi)
- Coordinates: 61°40′51″N 8°33′43″E

Geography
- Interactive map of the mountain
- Location: Innlandet, Norway
- Parent range: Jotunheimen
- Topo map: 1618 III Glittertinden

Svartholshøe is a mountain in Lom Municipality in Innlandet county, Norway. The 2,067-metre (6,781 ft) tall mountain is located in the Jotunheimen mountains within Jotunheimen National Park. The mountain sits about 18 kilometres (11 mi) south of the village of Fossbergom and about 36 kilometres (22 mi) southwest of the village of Vågåmo. The mountain is surrounded by several other notable mountains including Finnshalspiggen, Gråhøe, and Nørdre Trollsteinhøe to the north; Smådalshøe to the east; Grotbreahesten to the southeast; Trollsteinrundhøe, Trollsteineggi, and Glittertinden to the south; and Lauvhøe to the northwest.

== See also ==
- List of mountains of Norway
