= Trollsteinrundhøe =

Mountain in Innlandet, Norway

- Interactive map of the mountain

Highest point
- Elevation: 2,170 m (7,120 ft)
- Prominence: 136 m (446 ft)
- Parent peak: Glittertinden
- Isolation: 0.778 km (0.483 mi) to Trollsteineggje
- Coordinates: 61°40′29″N 8°33′25″E

Geography
- Location: Innlandet, Norway
- Parent range: Jotunheimen
- Topo map: 1618 III Glittertinden

Trollsteinrundhøe is a mountain in Lom Municipality in Innlandet county, Norway. The 2,170-metre (7,120 ft) tall mountain is located in the Jotunheimen mountains within Jotunheimen National Park. The mountain sits about 18 kilometres (11 mi) south of the village of Fossbergom and about 36 kilometres (22 mi) southwest of the village of Vågåmo. The mountain is surrounded by several other notable mountains including Finnshalspiggen, Gråhøe, Svartholshøe, and Nørdre Trollsteinhøe to the north; Smådalshøe to the northeast; Grotbreahesten to the east; Trollsteineggi and Glittertinden to the south; and Lauvhøe to the northwest.

== See also ==
- List of mountains of Norway
