= Grjotbreahesten =

Mountain in Innlandet, Norway

- Grotbreahesten
- Interactive map of the mountain

Highest point
- Elevation: 2,013 m (6,604 ft)
- Prominence: 94 m (308 ft)
- Parent peak: Glittertinden
- Isolation: 1.1 km (0.68 mi)
- Coordinates: 61°40′29″N 8°34′39″E

Geography
- Location: Innlandet, Norway
- Parent range: Jotunheimen
- Topo map: 1618 III Glittertinden

Grjotbreahesten is a mountain in Lom Municipality in Innlandet county, Norway. The 2,013-metre (6,604 ft) tall mountain is located in the Jotunheimen mountains within Jotunheimen National Park. The mountain sits about 18 kilometres (11 mi) south of the village of Fossbergom and about 36 kilometres (22 mi) southwest of the village of Vågåmo. The mountain is surrounded by several other notable mountains including Finnshalspiggen and Nørdre Trollsteinhøe to the north, Smådalshøe to the northeast, Trollsteineggje and Glittertinden to the south, Trollsteinrundhøe to the west, and Gråhøe and Svartholshøe to the northwest.

== See also ==
- List of mountains of Norway
