= Nautgardsoksle =

Mountain in Innlandet, Norway

- Interactive map of the mountain

Highest point
- Elevation: 2,089 m (6,854 ft)
- Prominence: 77 m (253 ft)
- Parent peak: Nautgardstinden
- Isolation: 1.6 km (0.99 mi)
- Coordinates: 61°36′37″N 8°43′59″E

Geography
- Location: Innlandet, Norway
- Parent range: Jotunheimen

Nautgardsoksle is a mountain in Lom Municipality in Innlandet county, Norway. The 2,089-metre (6,854 ft) tall mountain is located in the Jotunheimen mountains within Jotunheimen National Park. The mountain sits about 36 kilometres (22 mi) southwest of the village of Vågåmo. The mountain is surrounded by several other notable mountains including Stornubben and Hindnubben to the northeast, Nautgardstinden to the east, Besshøe to the south, and Austre Hestlægerhøe and Vestre Hestlægerhøe to the west.

== See also ==
- List of mountains of Norway
