= Liaberget =

Mountain in Innlandet, Norway

- Interactive map of the mountain

Highest point
- Elevation: 1,720 m (5,640 ft)
- Prominence: 170 m (560 ft)
- Isolation
- Coordinates: 61°44′45″N 8°51′57″E

Geography
- Location: Innlandet, Norway
- Parent range: Jotunheimen

Liaberget is a mountain in Lom Municipality, Norway. The 1,720-metre (5,640 ft) tall mountain is located in the Jotunheimen mountains about 17 kilometres (11 mi) southeast of the village of Fossbergom and about 18 kilometres (11 mi) southwest of the village of Vågåmo. The mountain is surrounded by several other notable mountains including Kvitingskjølen and Grjothovden to the west; Veslkjølen, Skarvhøe, and Ilvetjørnhøe to the northwest; Saukampen to the north; and Heranoshøe to the southwest. The lake Tesse lies about 4 kilometres (2.5 mi) to the east of the mountain.

== See also ==
- List of mountains of Norway
