= Russlirundhøe =

Mountain in Innlandet, Norway

- Interactive map of the mountain

Highest point
- Elevation: 1,825 m (5,988 ft)
- Prominence: 81 m (266 ft)
- Parent peak: Nautgardstinden
- Isolation: 3.2 km (2.0 mi)
- Coordinates: 61°35′42″N 8°49′20″E

Geography
- Location: Innlandet, Norway
- Parent range: Jotunheimen

Russlirundhøe is a mountain in Vågå Municipality in Innlandet county, Norway. The 1,825-metre (5,988 ft) tall mountain is located in the Jotunheimen mountains within Jotunheimen National Park. The mountain sits about 35 kilometres (22 mi) southwest of the village of Vågåmo and about 40 kilometres (25 mi) north of the village of Beitostølen. The mountain is surrounded by several other notable mountains including Hindnubban to the northeast, Stornubben to the north, Nautgardstinden to the west, and Besshøe and Kollhøin to the southwest. The lake Russvatnet lies about 5 kilometres (3.1 mi) to the southwest of the mountain.

== See also ==
- List of mountains of Norway by height
