= Blåhø =

Blåhø or variations thereof (Blåhøa, Blåhøe, or Blåhøi) may refer to:

== Places ==
- Blåhøa, Trøndelag, a mountain in Oppdal Municipality in Trøndelag county, Norway
- Blåhøa, Møre og Romsdal, a mountain in Sunndal Municipality in Møre og Romsdal county, Norway
- Blåhøe, Skjåk, a mountain in Skjåk Municipality in Innlandet county, Norway
- Blåhøe, Vågå, a mountain on the border of Dovre Municipality and Vågå Municipality in Innlandet county, Norway
- Blåhøe, Lesja, a mountain in Lesja Municipality in Innlandet county, Norway
- Blåhøe, Bøverdalen, a mountain the Bøverdalen valley in Lom Municipality in Innlandet county, Norway
- Blåhøe is a secondary peak on the mountain Eisteinhovde in Lom Municipality in Innlandet county, Norway
- Blåhøin and Blåhøe are two of the secondary peaks on the mountain Falketind in Dovre Municipality in Innlandet county, Norway
