= Stornubben =

Mountain in Innlandet, Norway

- Interactive map of the mountain

Highest point
- Elevation: 2,174 m (7,133 ft)
- Prominence: 176 m (577 ft)
- Parent peak: Nautgardstinden
- Isolation: 2 km (1.2 mi)
- Coordinates: 61°37′39″N 8°47′43″E

Geography
- Location: Innlandet, Norway
- Parent range: Jotunheimen

Stornubben is a mountain on the border of Vågå Municipality and Lom Municipality in Innlandet county, Norway. The 2,174-metre (7,133 ft) tall mountain is located in the Jotunheimen mountains within Jotunheimen National Park. The mountain sits about 32 kilometres (20 mi) southwest of the village of Vågåmo. The mountain is surrounded by several other notable mountains including Hindnubban to the northeast, Heranoshøi to the north, Glittertinden to the northwest, Nautgardstinden and Nautgardsoksli to the southwest, and Russlirundhøe to the south.

== See also ==
- List of mountains of Norway
