= Austre Hestlægerhøe =

Mountain in Innlandet, Norway

- Interactive map of the mountain

Highest point
- Elevation: 1,951 m (6,401 ft)
- Prominence: 219 m (719 ft)
- Parent peak: Nautgardstinden
- Isolation: 1.5 km (0.93 mi)
- Coordinates: 61°36′00″N 8°41′26″E

Geography
- Location: Innlandet, Norway
- Parent range: Jotunheimen

Austre Hestlægerhøe is a mountain on the border of Vågå Municipality and Lom Municipality in Innlandet county, Norway. The 1,951-metre (6,401 ft) tall mountain is located in the Jotunheimen mountains within Jotunheimen National Park. The mountain sits about 37 kilometres (23 mi) southwest of the village of Vågåmo. The mountain is surrounded by several other notable mountains including Styggehøi and Vestre Hestlægerhøe to the west, Glittertinden to the northwest, Nautgardsoksli and Nautgardstinden to the east, and Stornubben and Hindnubben to the northeast.

== See also ==
- List of mountains of Norway
