= Saukampen (Lom) =

Mountain in Innlandet, Norway

- Interactive map of the mountain

Highest point
- Elevation: 1,682 m (5,518 ft)
- Prominence: 124 m (407 ft)
- Parent peak: Kvitingskjølen
- Isolation: 2.5 km (1.6 mi)
- Coordinates: 61°46′31″N 8°51′49″E

Geography
- Location: Innlandet, Norway
- Parent range: Jotunheimen

Saukampen is a mountain in Lom Municipality in Innlandet county, Norway. The 1,682-metre (5,518 ft) tall mountain is located in the Jotunheimen mountains about 17 kilometres (11 mi) southeast of the village of Fossbergom and about 17 kilometres (11 mi) southwest of the village of Vågåmo. The mountain is surrounded by several other notable mountains including Kvitingskjølen and Grjothovden to the west; Veslkjølen, Skarvhøe, and Ilvetjørnhøe to the northwest; Liaberget to the south; and Heranoshøe to the southwest. The lake Tesse lies about 4 kilometres (2.5 mi) to the east of the mountain.

== See also ==
- List of mountains of Norway
