= Øvre Leirungen =

Lake in Innlandet, Norway

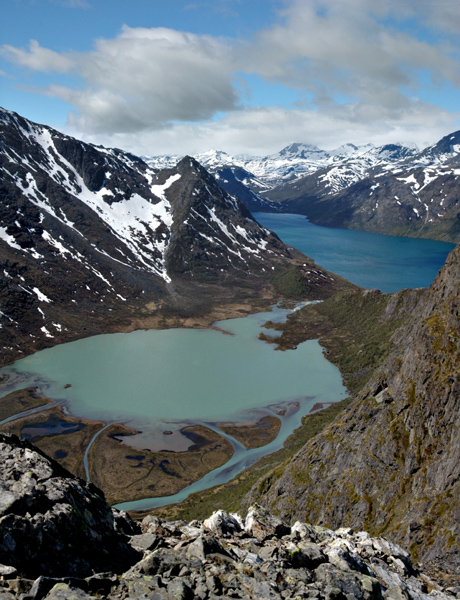
- Øvre Leirungen is the lake in front, Gjende is in the back.
- Interactive map of the lake
- Location: Vågå Municipality, Innlandet
- Coordinates: 61°4′8″N 08°7′7″E
- Basin countries: Norway
- Max. length: 350 metres (1,150 ft)
- Max. width: 280 metres (920 ft)
- Surface area: 0.5728 km^{2} (0.2212 sq mi)
- References: NVE

Øvre Leirungen is a lake in Vågå Municipality in Innlandet county, Norway. It is located in the Jotunheimen mountain range and also inside Jotunheimen National Park. The lake is located between Gjende lake and Leirungåse river. The lake Bukkehåmårtjønne lies just south of this lake.

== See also ==
- List of lakes in Norway
