= Grjothovden =

Mountain in Innlandet, Norway

- Interactive map of the mountain

Highest point
- Elevation: 1,747 m (5,732 ft)
- Prominence: 68 m (223 ft)
- Parent peak: Kvitingskjølen
- Isolation: 1.2 km (0.75 mi)
- Coordinates: 61°46′17″N 8°48′41″E

Geography
- Location: Innlandet, Norway
- Parent range: Jotunheimen

Grjothovden is a mountain in Lom Municipality in Innlandet county, Norway. The 1,747-metre (5,732 ft) tall mountain is located in the Jotunheimen mountains about 15 kilometres (9.3 mi) southeast of the village of Fossbergom and about 19 kilometres (12 mi) southwest of the village of Vågåmo. The mountain is surrounded by several other notable mountains including Kvitingskjølen to the west; Veslkjølen, Skarvhøe, and Ilvetjørnhøe to the northwest; Gråvåhøe to the north; Saukampen to the east; Liaberget to the southeast; and Heranoshøe to the south.

== See also ==
- List of mountains of Norway
