= Store Trollhøin =

Mountain in Innlandet, Norway

- Nørdre Trollsteinhøe
- Interactive map of the mountain

Highest point
- Elevation: 2,201 m (7,221 ft)
- Prominence: 347 m (1,138 ft)
- Parent peak: Glittertinden
- Isolation: 4.7 km (2.9 mi)
- Coordinates: 61°42′05″N 8°34′56″E

Geography
- Location: Innlandet, Norway
- Parent range: Jotunheimen
- Topo map: 1618 III Glittertinden

Store Trollhøin or Nørdre Trollsteinhøe is a mountain in Lom Municipality in Innlandet county, Norway. The 2,201-metre (7,221 ft) tall mountain is located in the Jotunheimen mountains within Jotunheimen National Park. The mountain sits about 16 kilometres (9.9 mi) south of the village of Fossbergom and about 32 kilometres (20 mi) southwest of the village of Vågåmo. The mountain is surrounded by several other notable mountains including Finnshalspiggen to the north; Smådalshøe to the east; Grotbreahesten, Trollsteineggi, and Glittertinden to the south; Trollsteinrundhøe, Svartholshøe, and Gråhøe to the southeast; and Lauvhøe to the northwest.

== See also ==
- List of mountains of Norway by height
