= Nautgardstinden =

Mountain in Innlandet, Norway

- Nautgardstind
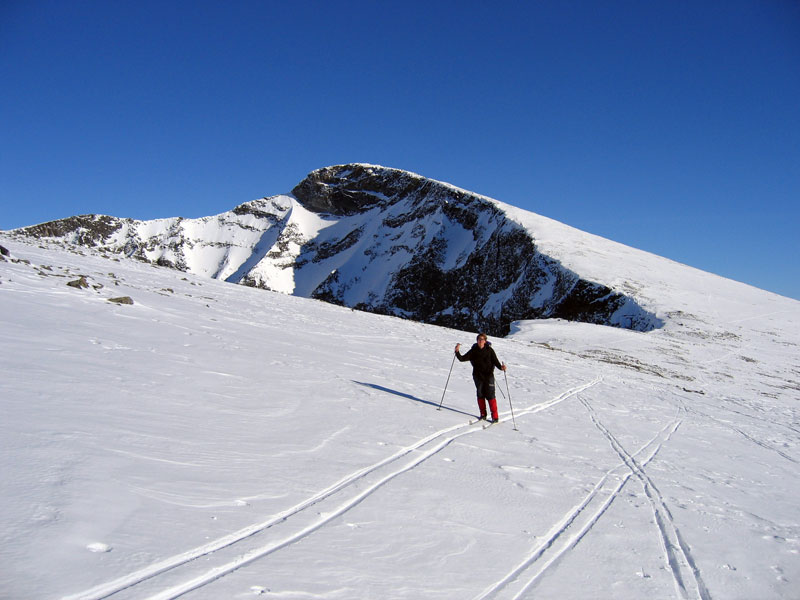

Highest point
- Elevation: 2,258 m (7,408 ft)
- Prominence: 574 m (1,883 ft)
- Isolation: 10.2 km (6.3 mi)
- Coordinates: 61°36′12″N 8°45′34″E

Geography
- Interactive map of the mountain
- Location: Innlandet, Norway
- Parent range: Jotunheimen
- Topo map: 1618 III Glittertinden

Climbing
- First ascent: 1841 (Wergeland)
- Easiest route: Skiing

Nautgardstinden or Nautgardstind is a mountain on the border of Vågå Municipality and Lom Municipality in Innlandet county, Norway. The 2,258-metre (7,408 ft) tall mountain is located in the Jotunheimen mountains within Jotunheimen National Park. The mountain sits about 35 kilometres (22 mi) southwest of the village of Vågåmo. The mountain is surrounded by several other notable mountains including Hindnubban and Stornubben to the northeast; Heranoshøi to the north; Glittertinden to the northwest; Nautgardsoksli, Austre Hestlægerhøe, and Vestre Hestlægerhøe to the west; Besshøe to the south; and Russlirundhøe to the east.

The mountain is situated on the absolute eastern flank of Jotunheimen between the Veodalen and Sjodalen valleys and is the southernmost and highest summit on a rather long ridge containing six other 2,000-metre (6,600 ft) peaks. The summit can be observed along parts of County Road 51 from Båtskaret in the south to Hindsæter in the north. From the south it is an almost perfect cone, and with fresh snow covering the peak, it is a sight admired by many tourists.

The summit is easily climbed from Sjodalen valley either from Hindsæter Mountain Lodge, which is the longer route, or from the confluence of the Russa and Sjoa rivers. Both ways the route will start in low birch forest and gradually enter long talus slopes and plains with many snow patches in the summer. In the winter, the summit is easily reached, but one should be very wary about the proximity of the northern wall, falling 500 metres (1,600 ft) into Nautgarden. From Hindsæter the rest of the summits in the massif is also reached on a rather long day hike. The views are enormous. There are no peaks in southern and eastern direction reaching higher than 1,850 metres (6,070 ft), and you see almost all of the eastern Oppland highlands. Theoretically you can see the hills north of Oslo, but it might be difficult to discern them. Snøhetta, the Rondane mountain range and all the mountains of Valdres, like Bitihorn can be seen from this summit. To the west many of the summits in Jotunheimen can be admired - most prominent among them from this vantage point - Glittertind, the distant neighbor to the northwest.

== Name ==
The first element is the name of the valley Nautgarden (also called Stornautgarden which means 'the big Nautgarden'). The last element is the finite form of tind which means 'mountain peak'. The name of the valley is the finite form of nautgard which means 'fencing for cattle'.

A smaller valley, about 3 kilometres (1.9 mi) to the east, is called Veslnautgarden which means 'the small Nautgarden'. There are two small side valleys of Stornautgarden which are named Båsen, the finite form of bås which means 'stall'. The reason for these names are probably based on likeness and comparison.

== See also ==
- List of mountains of Norway
