= Ilvetjørnhøe =

Mountain in Innlandet, Norway

- Ilvetjørnhøi / Ilvetjørnhøa
- Interactive map of the mountain

Highest point
- Elevation: 1,873 m (6,145 ft)
- Prominence: 92 m (302 ft)
- Parent peak: Kvitingskjølen
- Isolation: 0.956 km (0.594 mi)
- Coordinates: 61°47′14″N 8°44′16″E

Geography
- Location: Innlandet, Norway
- Parent range: Jotunheimen

Ilvetjørnhøe is a mountain in Lom Municipality in Innlandet county, Norway. The 1,873-metre (6,145 ft) tall mountain is located in the Jotunheimen mountains about 11 kilometres (6.8 mi) southeast of the village of Fossbergom and about 20 kilometres (12 mi) southwest of the village of Vågåmo. The mountain is surrounded by several other notable mountains including Veslekjølen to the west; Skarvhøe to the north; Gråvåhøe to the east; Grjothovden, Liaberget, and Saukampen to the southeast; and Kvitingskjølen to the south.

== See also ==
- List of mountains of Norway
