= Bukkehåmårtjønne =

Lake in Innlandet, Norway

- Interactive map of the lake
- Location: Vågå Municipality, Innlandet
- Coordinates: 61.4634°N 8.7124°E
- Basin countries: Norway
- Max. length: 700 metres (2,300 ft)
- Max. width: 450 metres (1,480 ft)
- Surface area: 0.214 km^{2} (53 acres)
- Surface elevation: 1,594 metres (5,230 ft)
- References: NVE

Bukkehåmårtjønne is a small lake in Vågå Municipality in Innlandet county, Norway. The lake is located in the eastern part of the Jotunheimen mountains, just inside the boundaries of the Jotunheimen National Park. At an elevation of 1,594 metres (5,230 ft) above sea level, this is the highest lake that has been investigated as a climate archive in southern Norway.

A small glacier, Bukkehåmmårbreen, is draining meltwater into the lake at present. This glacier reformed just short of 6,000 years ago following the Holocene climate optimum and has existed continuously since. After growing gradually towards 4,000 years before present (BP) the glacier has been of near present size over the last 4,000 years, growing slightly larger over the last 2,000–2,500 years. Prior to the climate optimum and following the deglaciation the glacier melted some 10,000 years before present.

The flat valley-shoulder that the lake is eroded into is locally known as a "fly". This particular level at about 1,600 metres (5,200 ft) above sea level and is believed to have been formed between 100 and 85 million years ago during the Cretaceous period. Standing on the shore-line of Bukkehåmmårtjørna thus means that you are standing on the remnants of a landscape that the Dinosaurs ruled.

The small lake existed prior to the Last Glacial Maximum since it contains organic material older than 30,000 years old. Currently being reassessed, growing evidence now indicates that much of the landscape that can be seen from this site is practically unchanged since the age of the Mammoth who lived on the wide plateaus more than 40,000 years ago.

The view from the lake, or higher up on the mountain-peak Høgdebrotet therefore includes a view into the landscapes of the distant past, including the landscape of the dinosaurs, the pre-ice age landscape, the landscape of the Mammoth during the last glacial period. By squinting your eyes and imagining the present forest-limit below, located some 300 m higher than at present and by imagining the glaciers of Leirungsalpene being absent one can also see the landscape as it was 7,000 years ago.

== See also ==
- List of lakes in Norway
