= Veodalen =

Valley in Innlandet, Norway

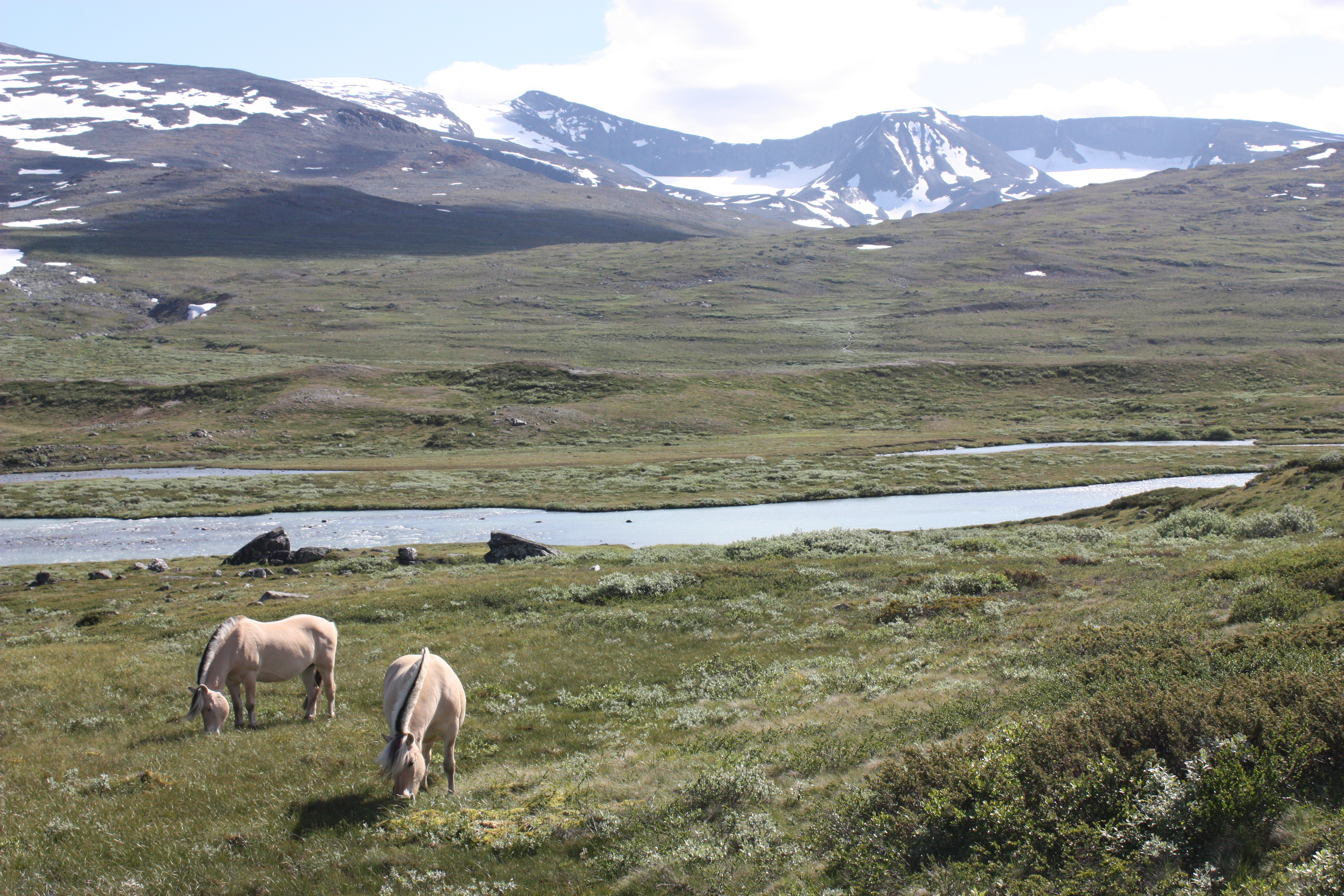
- Horses grazing in Veodalen
- Length: 30 kilometres (19 mi) W-E

Geology
- Type: River valley

Geography
- Location: Innlandet, Norway
- Coordinates: 61.6333°N 8.6842°E
- River: Veo

Location
- Interactive map of the valley

Veodalen is a valley in Lom Municipality and Vågå Municipality in Innlandet county, Norway. The 30-kilometre (19 mi) long valley lies on the south side of the main Ottadalen valley. The valley begins at the Veobreen glacier, which is surrounded by the mountains Veobretinden, Veopallan, and Veotinden in the Jotunheimen mountains. The valley then follows the river Veo to the east. The valley ends where the river joins the river Sjoa and the valley becomes part of the larger Sjodalen valley. A road runs through most of the valley, all the way up to the Glitterheim tourist cabin, about 8 kilometres (5.0 mi) from the innermost part of the valley. The inner half of the valley is located inside Jotunheimen National Park.
