= Eisteinhovde =

Mountain in Innlandet, Norway

- Einsteinhovde
- Interactive map of the mountain

Highest point
- Elevation: 1,841 m (6,040 ft)
- Prominence: 361 m (1,184 ft)
- Parent peak: Store Lauvhøi
- Isolation: 2.2 km (1.4 mi) to Lauvhøe
- Coordinates: 61°45′33″N 8°33′54″E

Geography
- Location: Innlandet, Norway
- Parent range: Jotunheimen

Eisteinhovde is a mountain in Lom Municipality in Innlandet county, Norway. The 1,841-metre (6,040 ft) tall mountain is located in the Jotunheimen mountains about 9 kilometres (5.6 mi) south of the village of Fossbergom and about 30 kilometres (19 mi) southwest of the village of Vågåmo. The mountain is surrounded by several other notable mountains including Lauvhøe to the southwest, Lomseggje to the northwest, Veslkjølen and Skarvhøe to the northeast, Kvitingskjølen to the east, Heranoshøe to the southeast, and Finnshalspiggen and Store Trollhøin to the south.

== See also ==
- List of mountains of Norway
