= Hindnubban =

Mountain in Innlandet, Norway

- Hindnubben (unofficial)
- Interactive map of the mountain

Highest point
- Elevation: 1,874 m (6,148 ft)
- Prominence: 14 m (46 ft)
- Parent peak: Nautgardstinden
- Isolation: 0.684 km (0.425 mi)
- Coordinates: 61°38′38″N 8°51′13″E

Geography
- Location: Innlandet, Norway
- Parent range: Jotunheimen

Hindnubban is a mountain on the border of Vågå Municipality and Lom Municipality in Innlandet county, Norway. The 1,874-metre (6,148 ft) tall mountain is located in the Jotunheimen mountains on the border of Jotunheimen National Park. The mountain sits about 28 kilometres (17 mi) southwest of the village of Vågåmo. The mountain is surrounded by several other notable mountains including Heranoshøi to the northwest, Glittertinden to the west, Stornubben and Nautgardstinden to the southwest, and Russlirundhøe to the south.

== See also ==
- List of mountains of Norway
