= Styggehøi =

Mountain in Innlandet, Norway

- Styggehøe
- Interactive map of the mountain

Highest point
- Elevation: 1,885 m (6,184 ft)
- Prominence: 132 m (433 ft)
- Isolation: 4 km (2.5 mi)
- Coordinates: 61°35′19″N 8°37′10″E

Geography
- Location: Innlandet, Norway
- Parent range: Jotunheimen

Styggehøi is a mountain on the border of Vågå Municipality and Lom Municipality in Innlandet county, Norway. The 1,885-metre (6,184 ft) tall mountain is located in the Jotunheimen mountains within Jotunheimen National Park. The mountain sits about 40 kilometres (25 mi) southwest of the village of Vågåmo. The mountain is surrounded by several other notable mountains including Austre Hestlægerhøe and Vestre Hestlægerhøe to the east, Glittertinden to the north, Veotinden and Veobreahesten to the east, and Surtningssue to the southwest.

== See also ==
- List of mountains of Norway
