= Russvatnet =

Lake in Innlandet, Norway

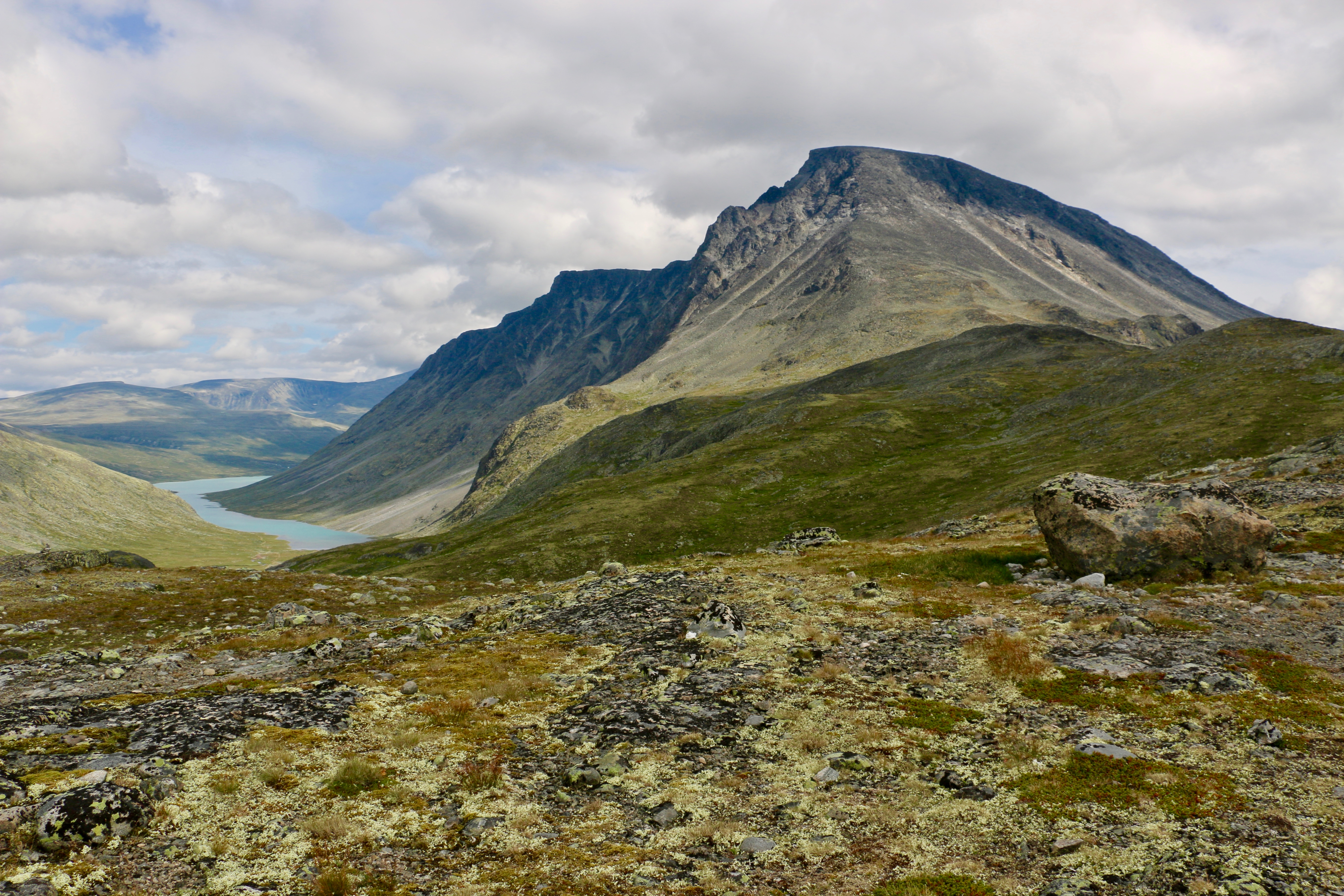
- View of the lake with Besshø to the right
- Interactive map of the lake
- Location: Vågå Municipality, Innlandet
- Coordinates: 61°33′1.7″N 8°40′33.3″E
- Primary outflows: River Russa
- Catchment area: Sjoa
- Basin countries: Norway
- Max. length: 10.3 kilometres (6.4 mi)
- Max. width: 500 metres (1,600 ft)
- Surface area: 4.6221 km^{2} (1.7846 sq mi)
- Shore length^{1}: 22.93 kilometres (14.25 mi)
- Surface elevation: 1,175 metres (3,855 ft)
- References: NVE
- ^{1} Shore length is not a well-defined measure.

Russvatnet is a lake in Vågå Municipality in Innlandet county, Norway. The 4.6-square-kilometre (1.8 sq mi) lake is located in the Jotunheimen mountain range and also within Jotunheimen National Park. It lies in a U-shaped valley between the mountains Surtningssue, Nautgardstinden, and Besshø.

== See also ==
- List of lakes in Norway
