= Vestre Hestlægerhøe =

Mountain in Innlandet, Norway

- Interactive map of the mountain

Highest point
- Elevation: 1,758 m (5,768 ft)
- Prominence: 53 m (174 ft)
- Coordinates: 61°35′35″N 8°39′27″E

Geography
- Location: Innlandet, Norway
- Parent range: Jotunheimen

Climbing
- Easiest route: path from Glitterheim then up 70 vertical meters on mountain's mildest spur.

Vestre Hestlægerhøe is a mountain on the border of Vågå Municipality and Lom Municipality in Innlandet county, Norway. The 1,758-metre (5,768 ft) tall mountain is located in the Jotunheimen mountains within Jotunheimen National Park. The mountain sits about 40 kilometres (25 mi) southwest of the village of Vågåmo.

The peak of Vestre Hestlægerhøe rises to a height of 1,758 metres (5,768 ft) and has a topographic prominence of 53 metres (174 ft). The mountain is surrounded by several other notable mountains including Styggehøi to the west, Glittertinden to the north, and Austre Hestlægerhøe and Nautgardsoksli to the east. The mountain area drains via the river Veo to the north and the river Russa to the south, both tributaries of the river Sjoa.

== See also ==
- List of mountains of Norway
