= Heranoshøe =

Mountain in Innlandet, Norway

- Interactive map of the mountain

Highest point
- Elevation: 1,665 m (5,463 ft)
- Prominence: 199 m (653 ft)
- Parent peak: Glittertinden
- Isolation: 3.8 km (2.4 mi)
- Coordinates: 61°41′22″N 8°48′09″E

Geography
- Location: Innlandet, Norway
- Parent range: Jotunheimen

Heranoshøe is a mountain in Lom Municipality in Innlandet county, Norway.

== Location ==
The 1,665-metre (5,463 ft) tall mountain is located in the Jotunheimen mountains about 21 kilometres (13 mi) southeast of the village of Fossbergom and about 27 kilometres (17 mi) southwest of the village of Vågåmo. The mountain is surrounded by several other notable mountains including Liaberget, Grjothovden, and Saukampen to the northeast; Kvitingskjølen to the north; Finnshalspiggen and Store Trollhøin to the northeast; and Nautgardstinden to the south.

== See also ==
- List of mountains of Norway
