= Tesse =

Lake in Innlandet, Norway

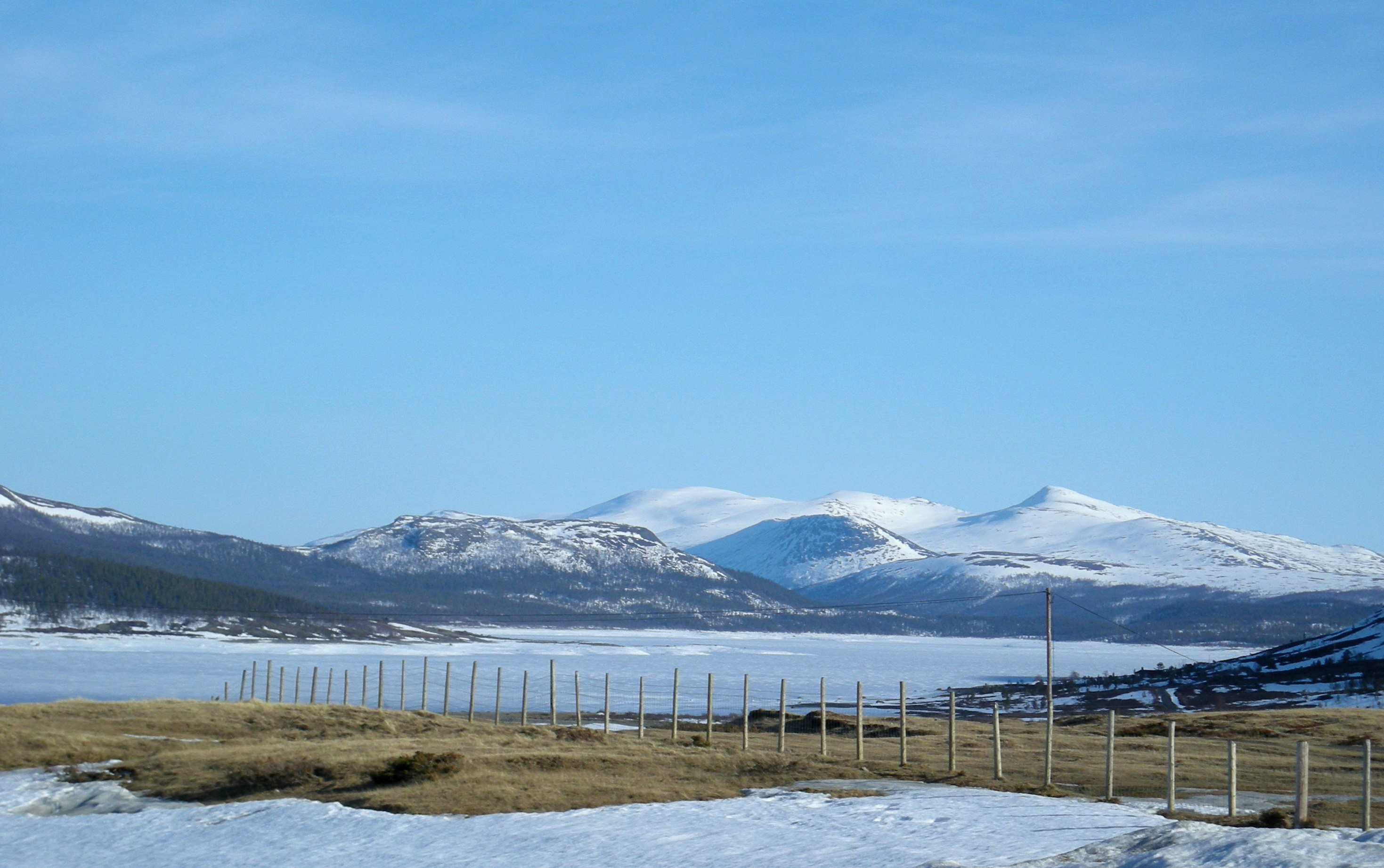
- Interactive map of the lake
- Location: Lom Municipality, Innlandet
- Coordinates: 61.74517°N 8.97548°E
- Basin countries: Norway
- Max. length: 8.8 kilometres (5.5 mi)
- Max. width: 2.1 kilometres (1.3 mi)
- Surface area: 12.78 km^{2} (4.93 sq mi)
- Max. depth: 68 metres (223 ft)
- Shore length^{1}: 24.14 kilometres (15.00 mi)
- Surface elevation: 856 metres (2,808 ft)
- References: NVE
- ^{1} Shore length is not a well-defined measure.

Tesse is a lake that lies in Lom Municipality and Vågå Municipality in Innlandet county, Norway. The 12.78-square-kilometre (4.93 sq mi) lake lies about 10 kilometres (6.2 mi) east of the mountain Kvitingskjølen and about 4 kilometres (2.5 mi) south of the river Otta. The lake is mostly located in Lom Municipality, but some very small parts of the lake cross over into Vågå Municipality.

== See also ==
- List of lakes in Norway
