= Blåhøe, Vågå =

Mountain in Innlandet, Norway

Blåhøe
- Blåhø (unofficial)
- Interactive map of the mountain

Highest point
- Elevation: 1,617 m (5,305 ft)
- Prominence: 761 m (2,497 ft)
- Isolation: 17.3 km (10.7 mi)
- Coordinates: 61°53′50″N 9°17′06″E

Geography
- Location: Innlandet, Norway

Blåhøe is a mountain in Innlandet county in Norway. The 1,617-metre (5,305 ft) tall mountain is located on the border of Vågå Municipality and Dovre Municipality. It is located about 10 kilometres (6.2 mi) south of the village of Dovre and about 10 kilometres (6.2 mi) east of the village of Vågåmo. The European route E6 highway runs past the east side of the mountain.

== Media gallery ==
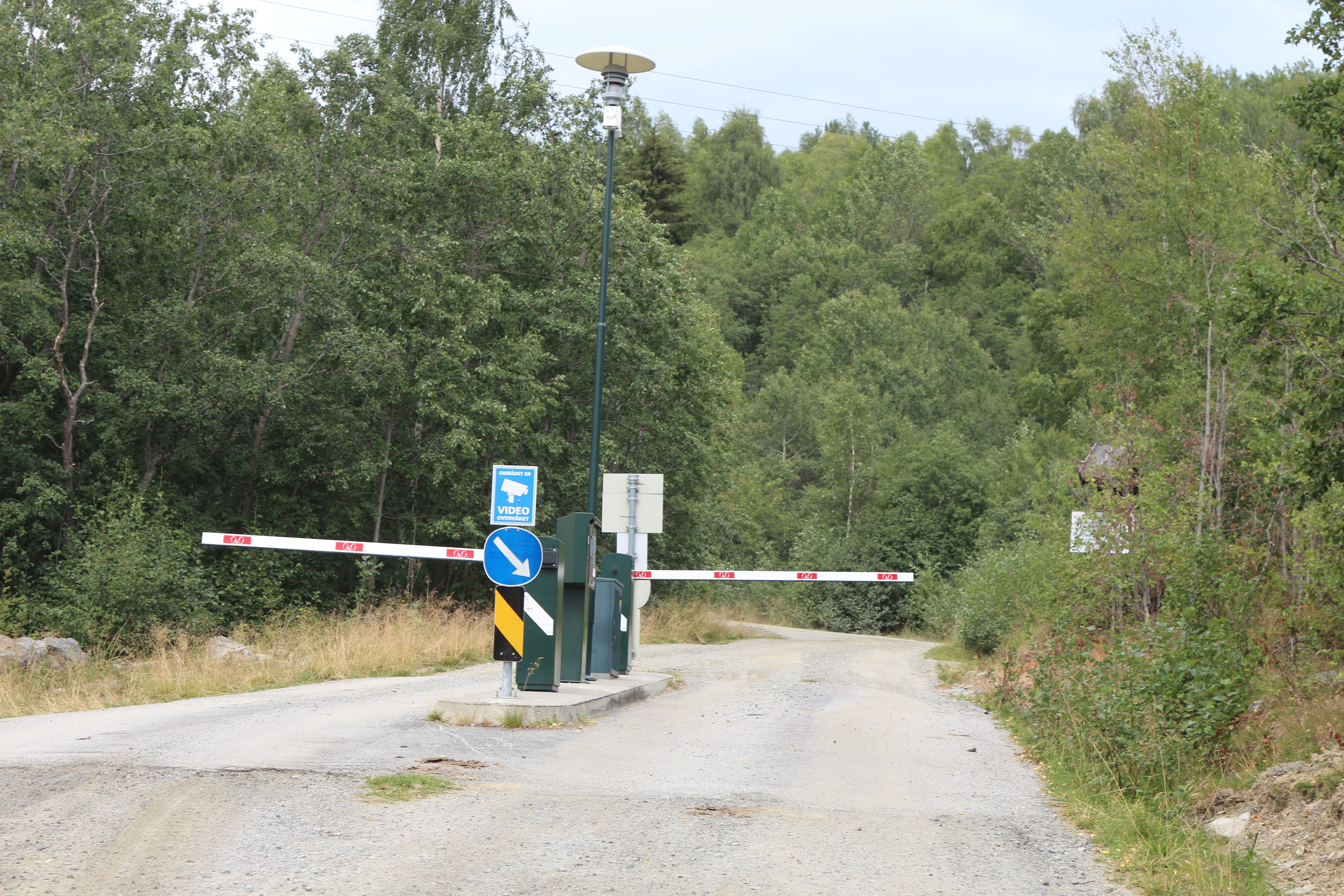
Tollroad

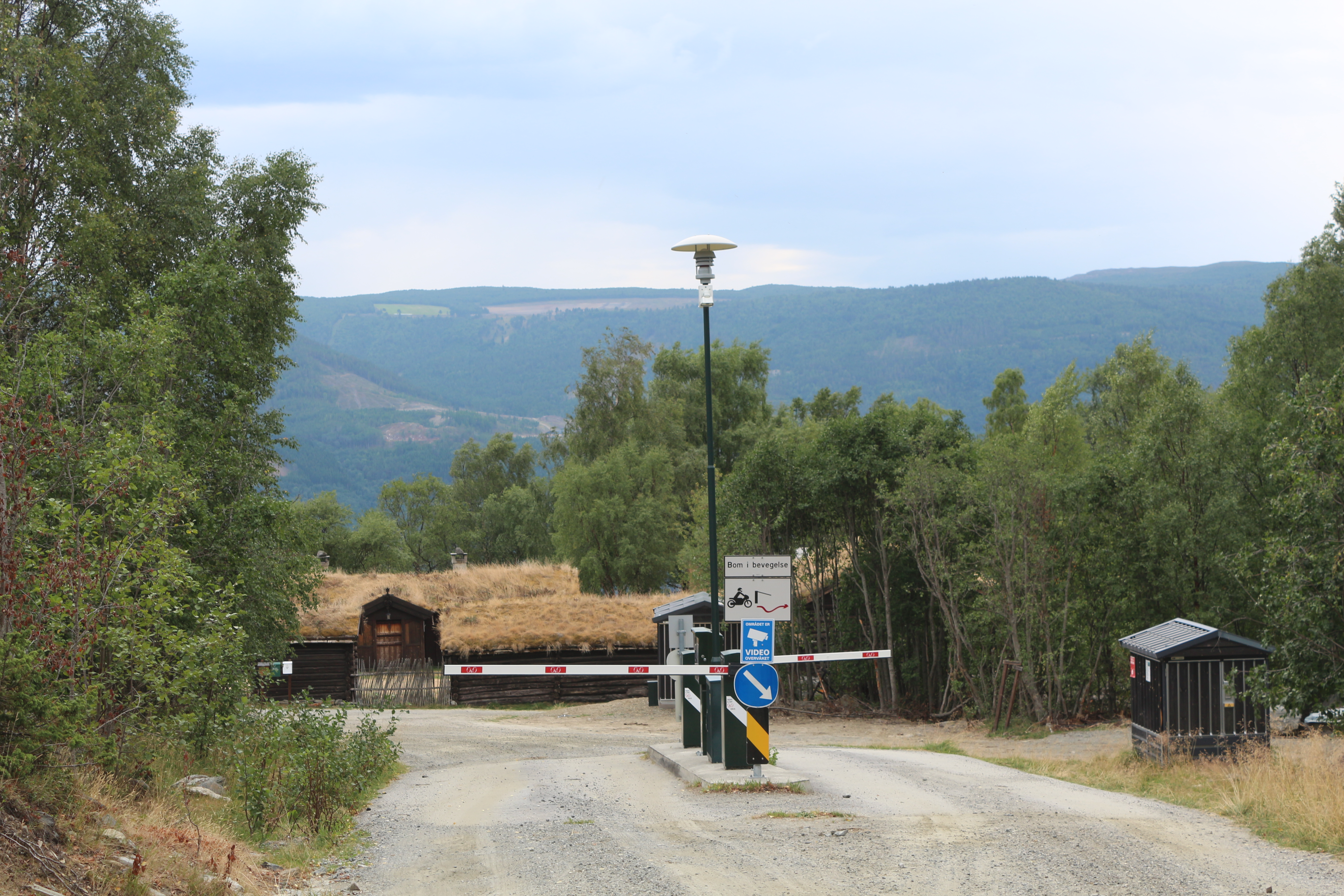
Tollroad

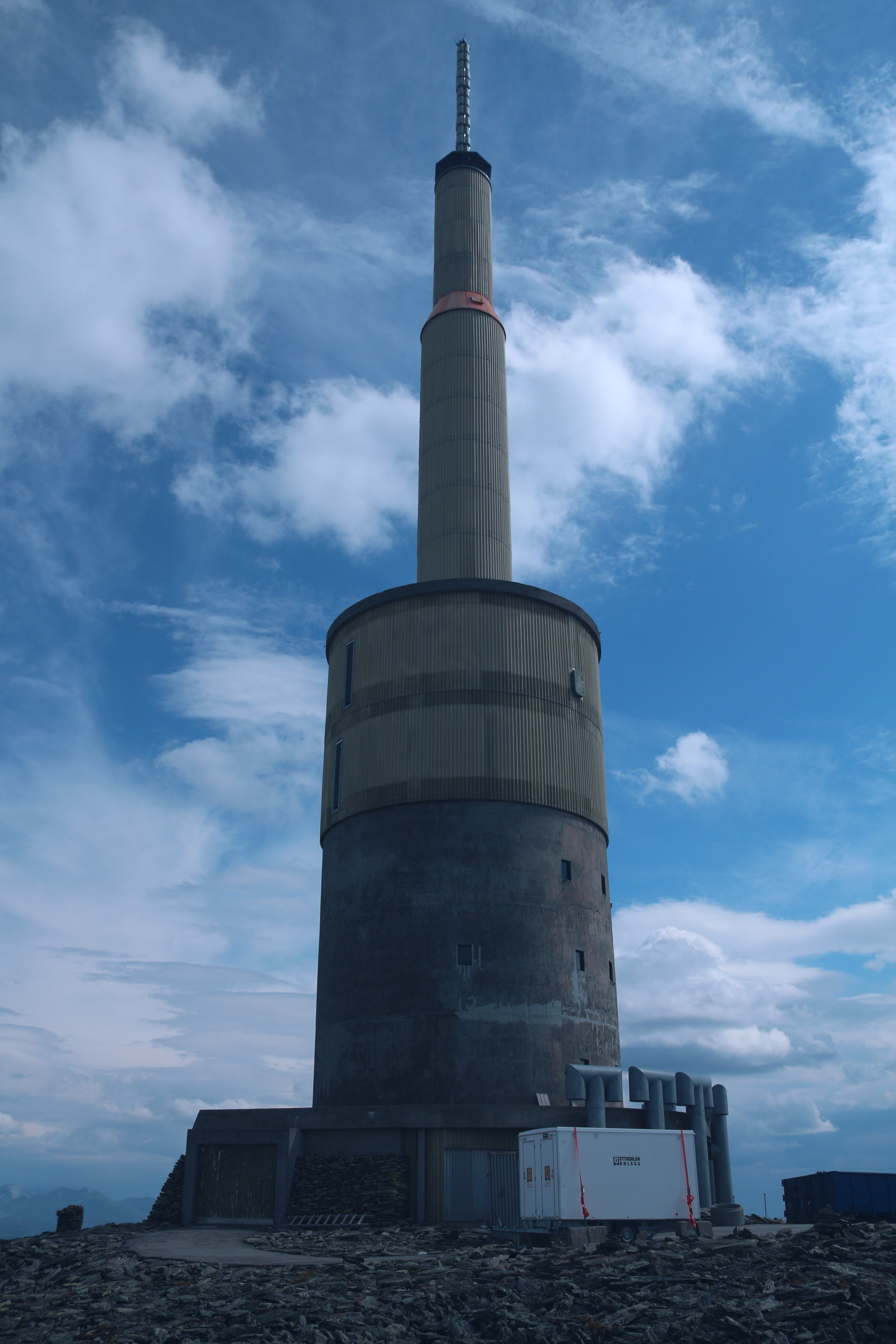
Radiolink

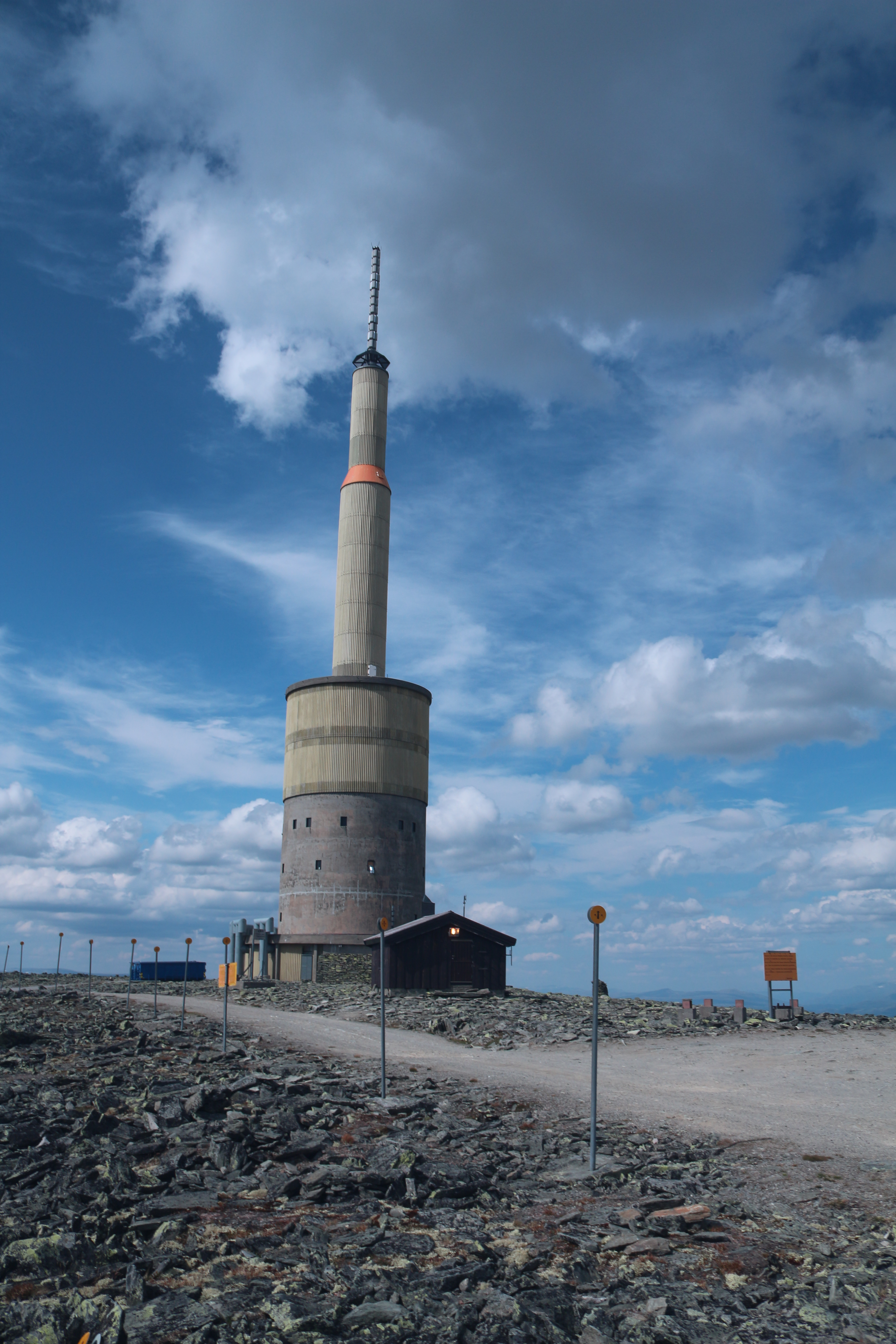
Radiolink

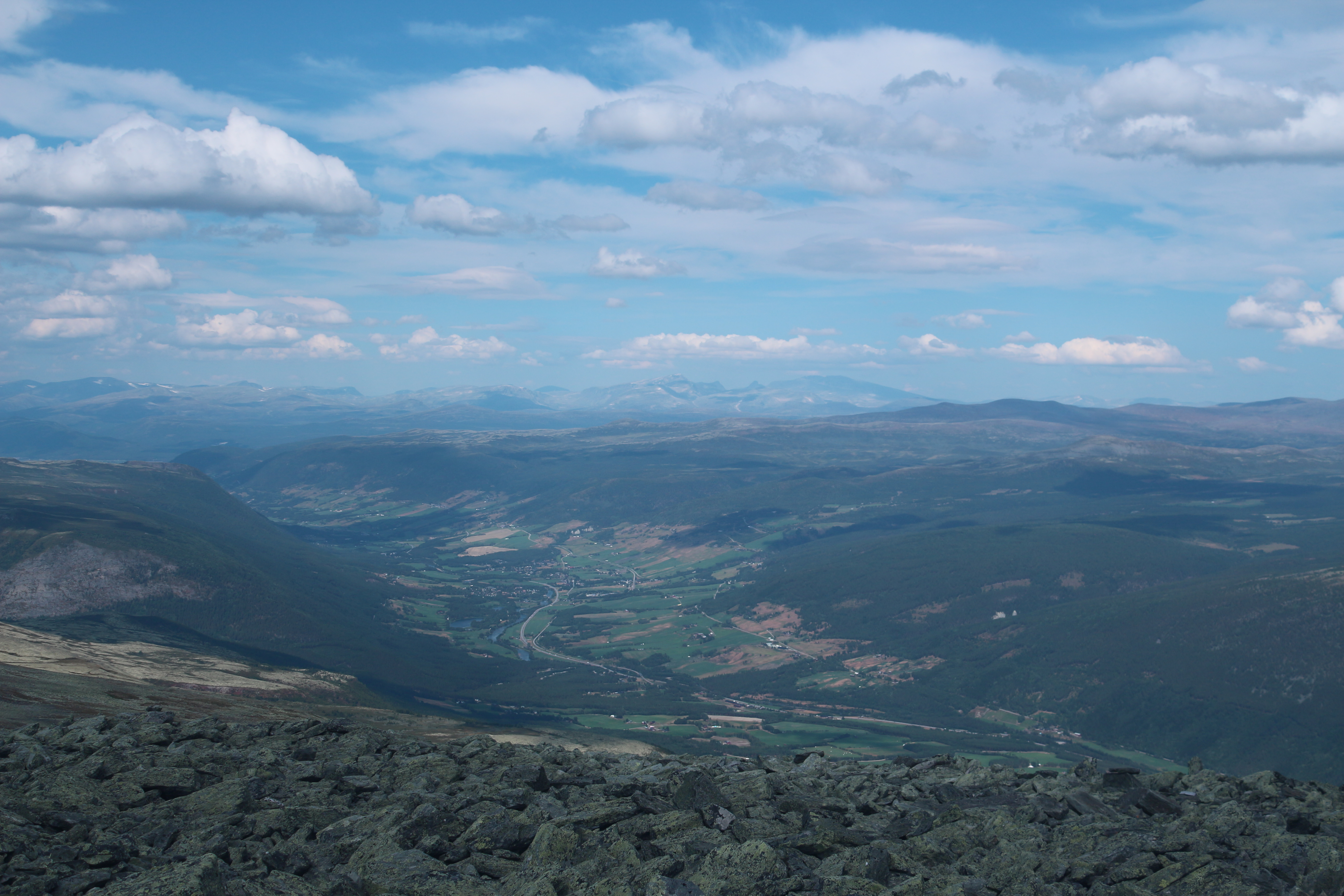
Gubrandsdalen

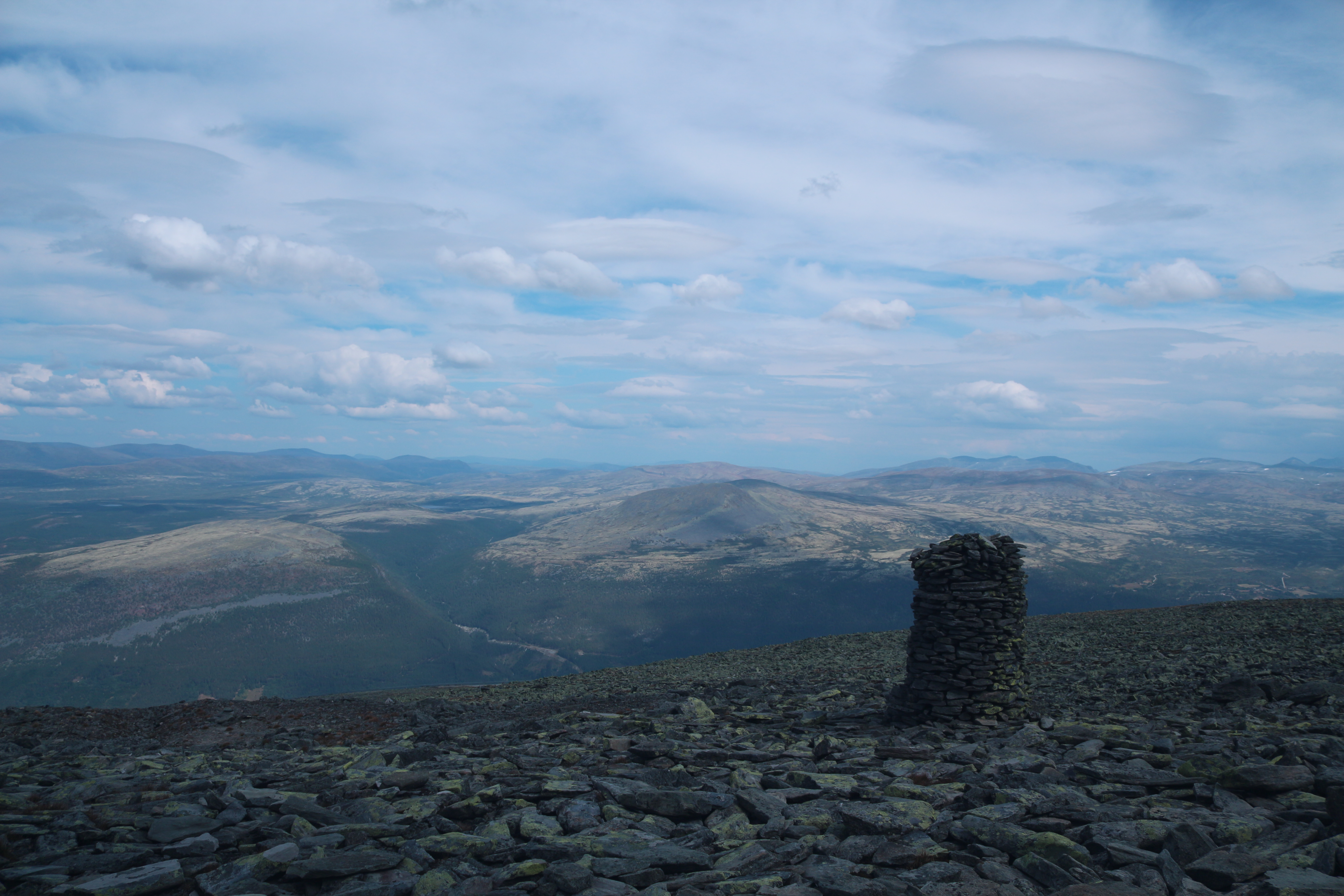
Mountainpeaks

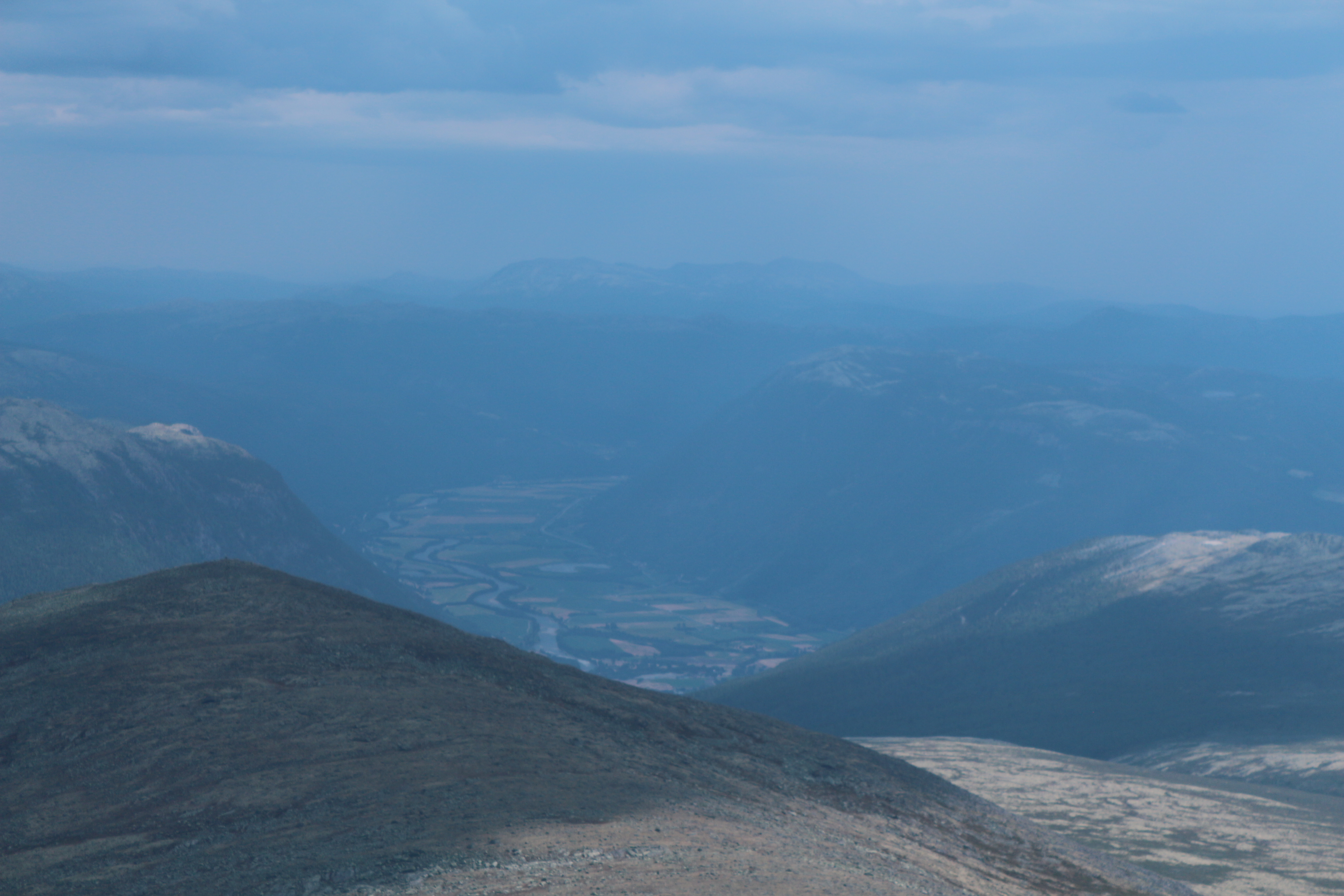
Otta

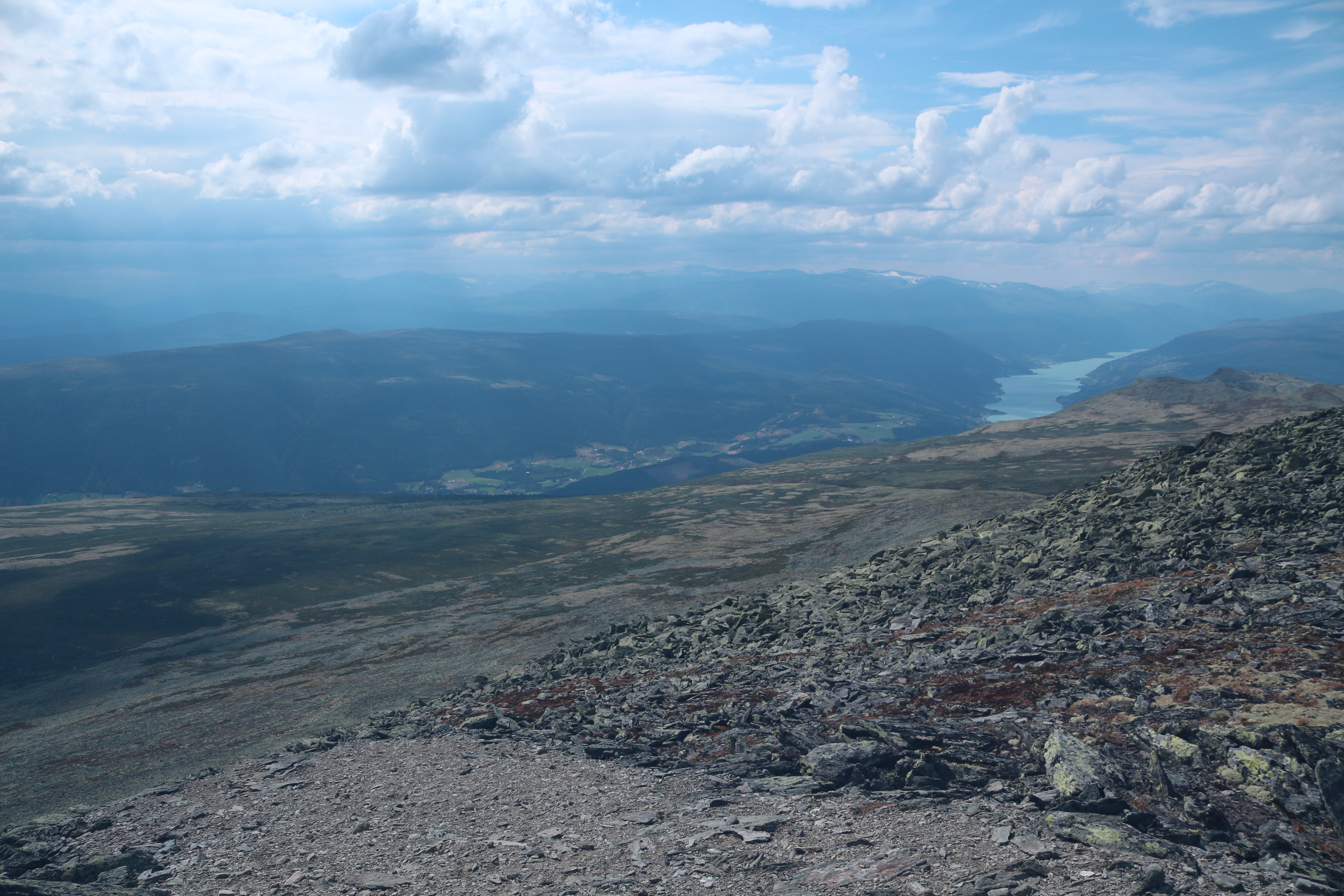
Lom

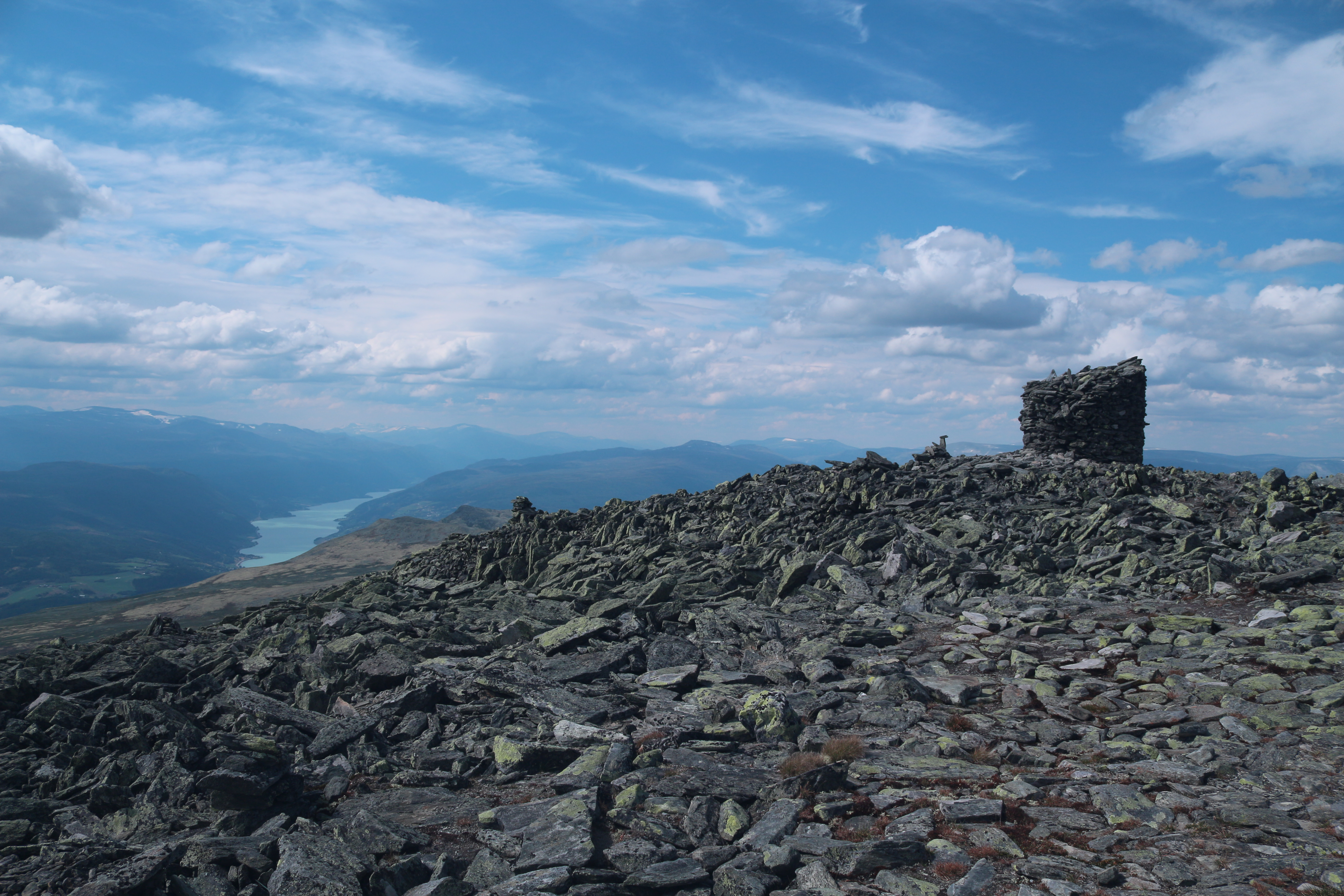
The top

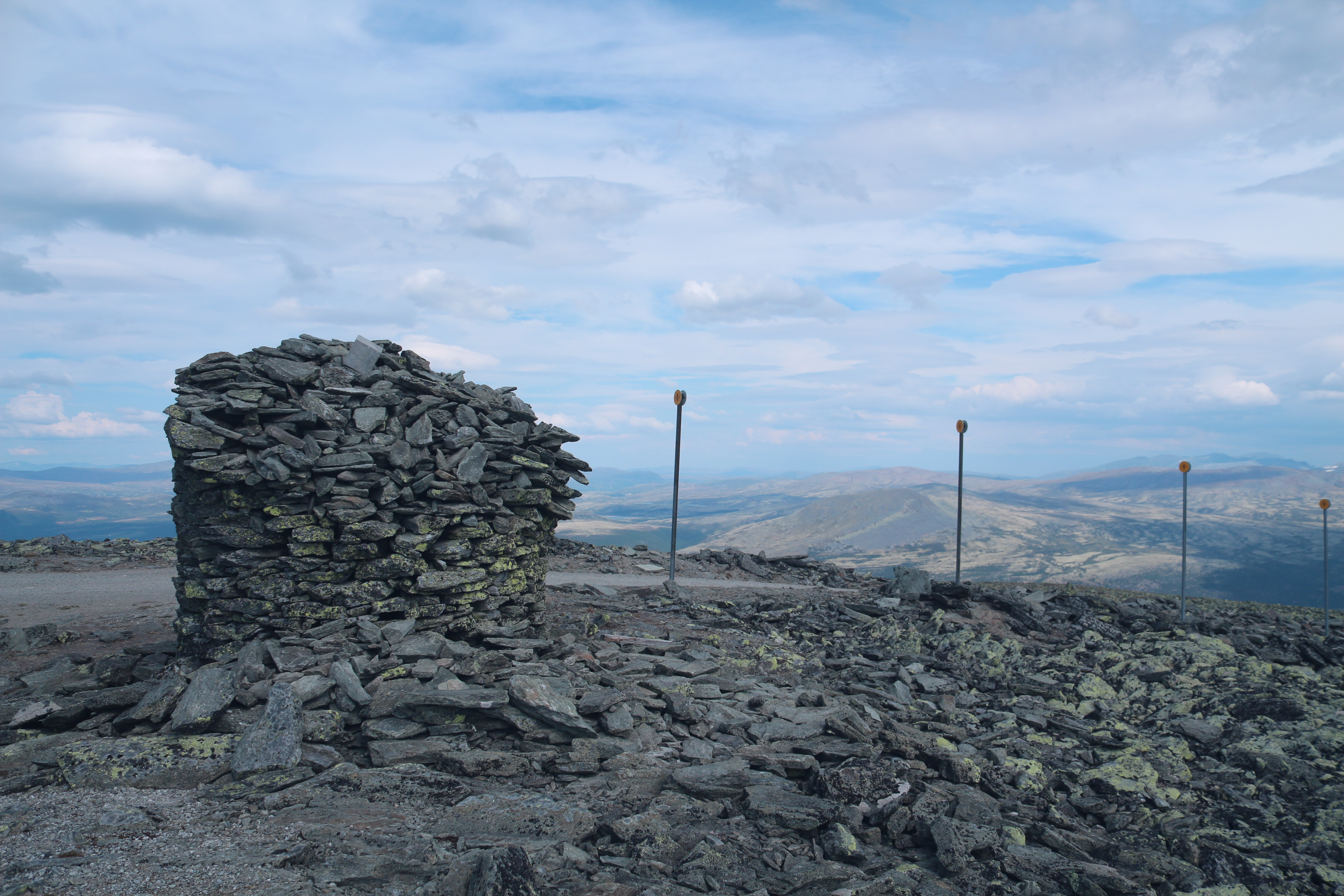
The top

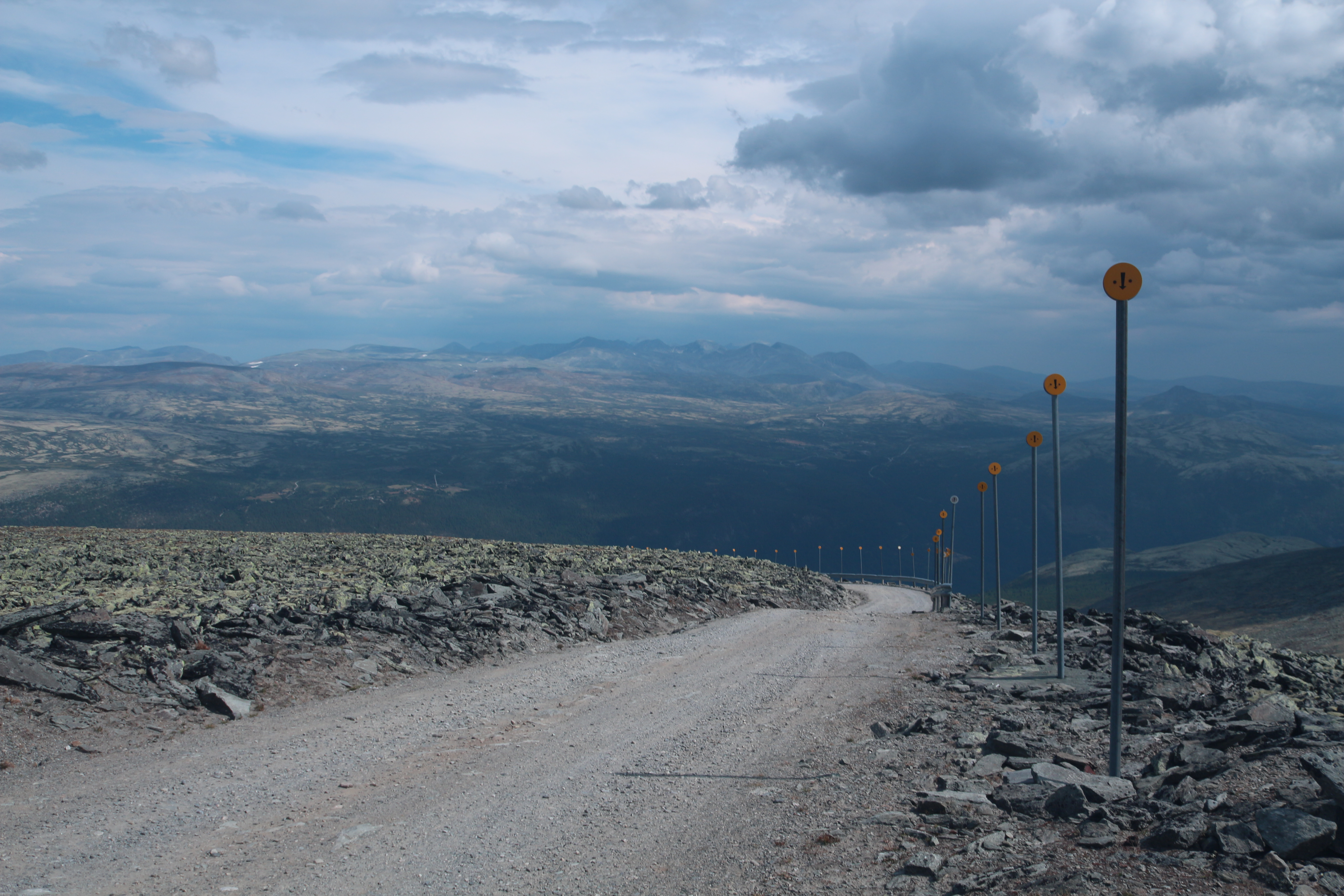
Road down

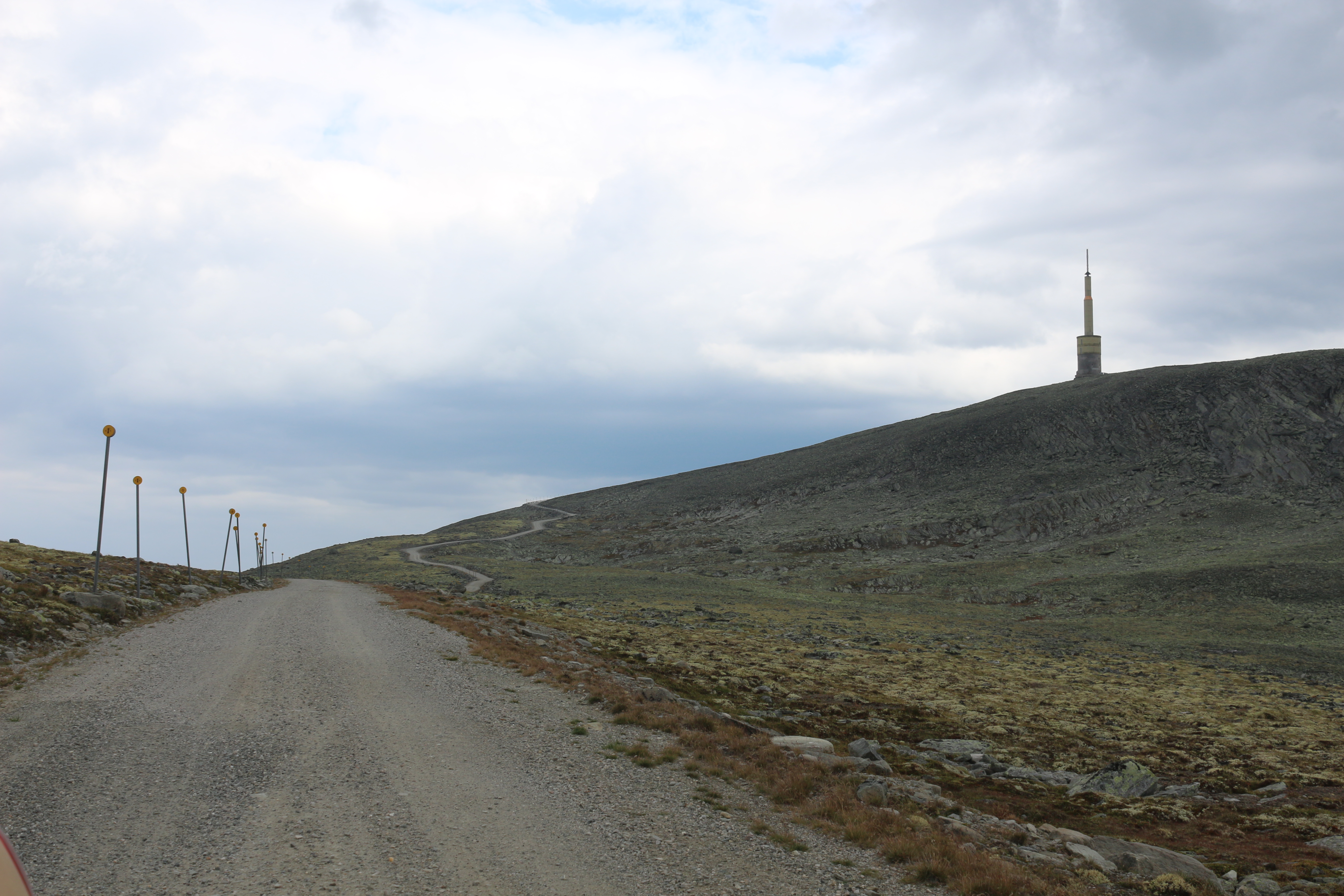
Road up

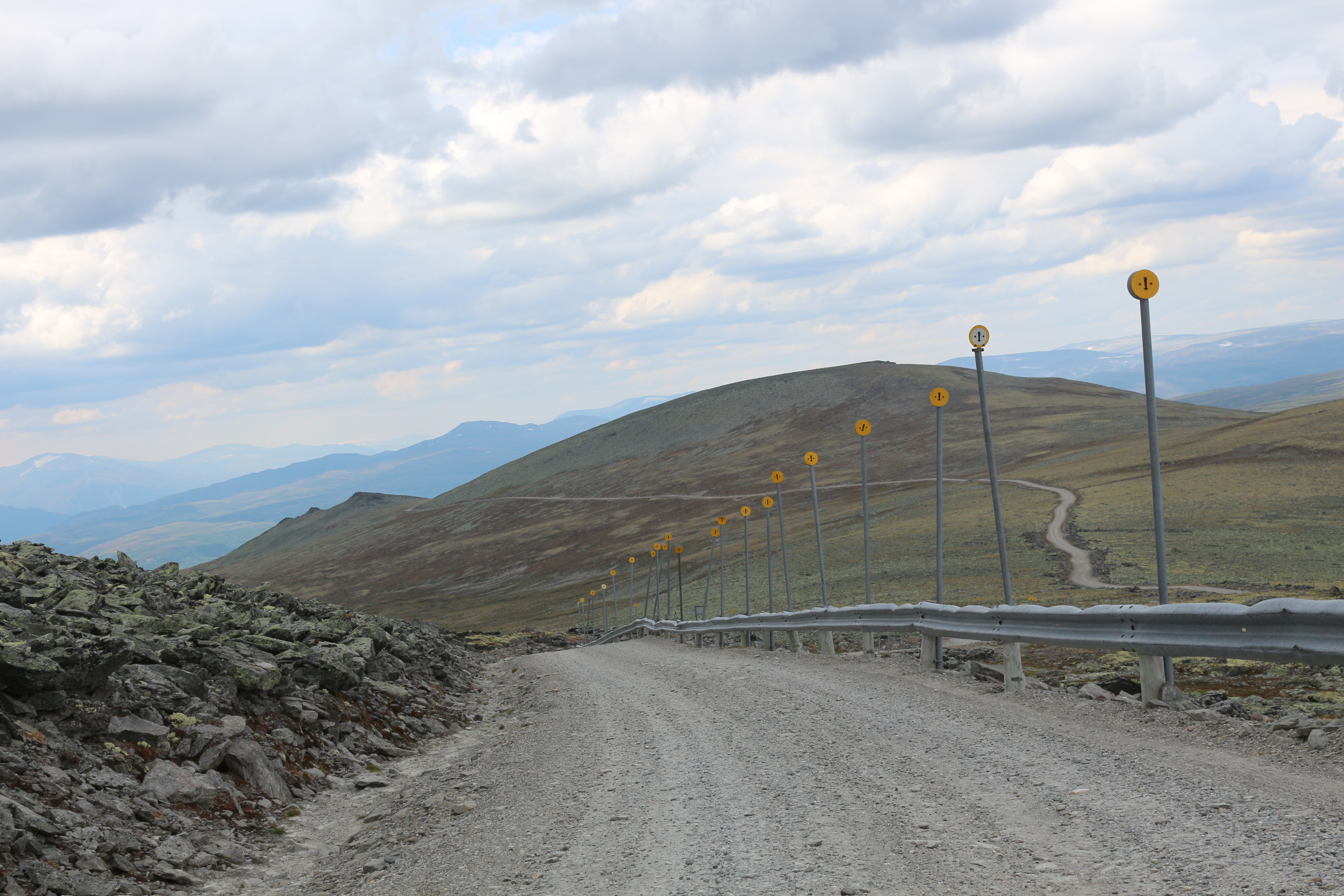
Road down

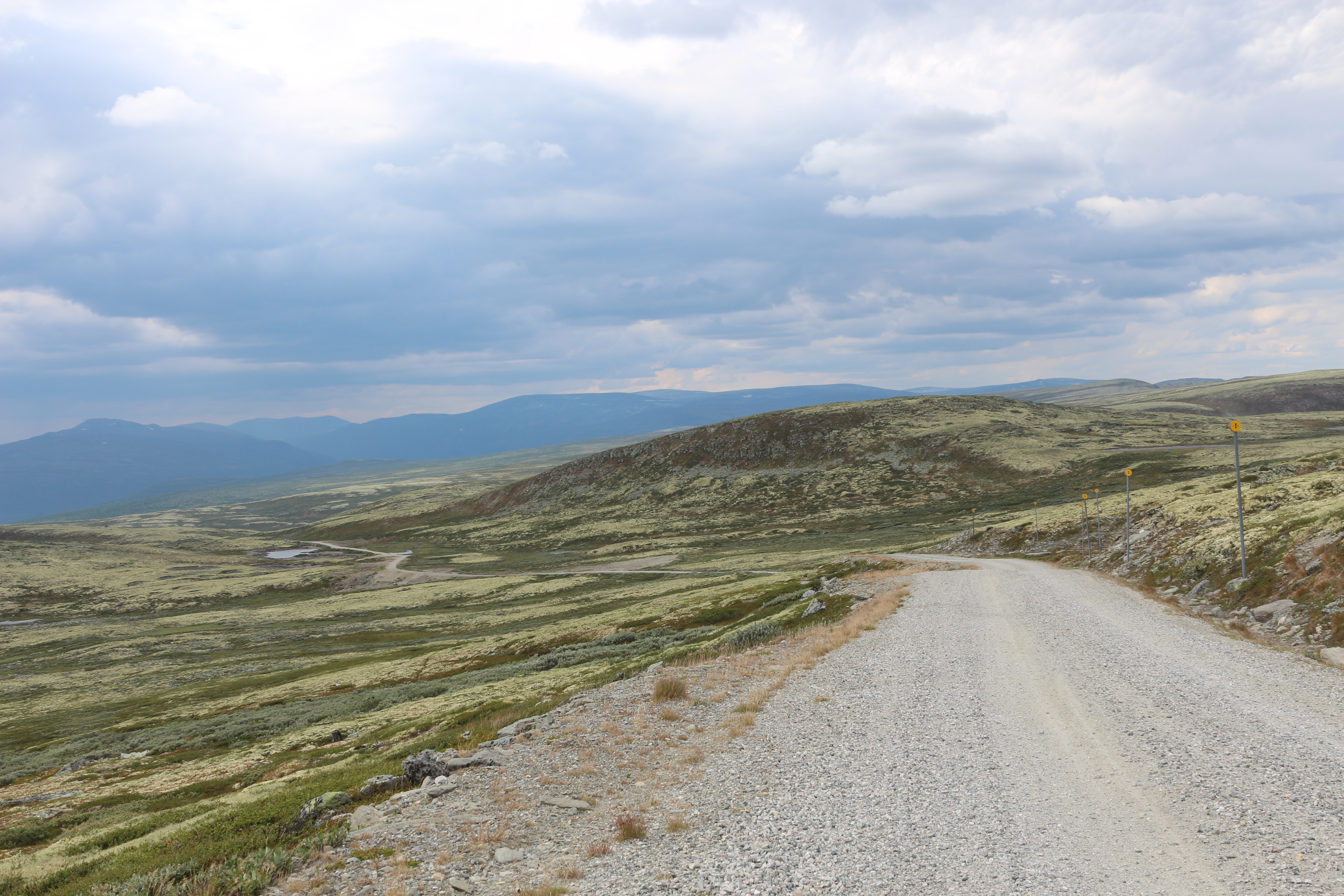
Road down

== See also ==
- List of mountains of Norway
