= Skarvhøe =

Mountain in Innlandet, Norway

- Skarvhøi / Skarvhøa
- Interactive map of the mountain

Highest point
- Elevation: 1,739 m (5,705 ft)
- Prominence: 79 m (259 ft)
- Parent peak: Kvitingskjølen
- Isolation: 0.918 km (0.570 mi)
- Coordinates: 61°48′10″N 8°43′22″E

Geography
- Location: Innlandet, Norway
- Parent range: Jotunheimen

Skarvhøe is a mountain in Lom Municipality in Innlandet county, Norway. The 1,739-metre (5,705 ft) tall mountain is located in the Jotunheimen mountains about 9 kilometres (5.6 mi) southeast of the village of Fossbergom and about 21 kilometres (13 mi) southwest of the village of Vågåmo. The mountain is surrounded by several other notable mountains including Eisteinhovde and Veslkjølen to the southwest; Ilvetjørnhøe to the south; Gråvåhøe, Grjothovden, and Saukampen to the southeast; and Kvitingskjølen to the south. The name loosely translates to "Scarf Hill" in English.

== See also ==
- List of mountains of Norway
