= Glitterheim =

Cabin in Norway

Coordinates: 61°37′22″N 8°37′57″E

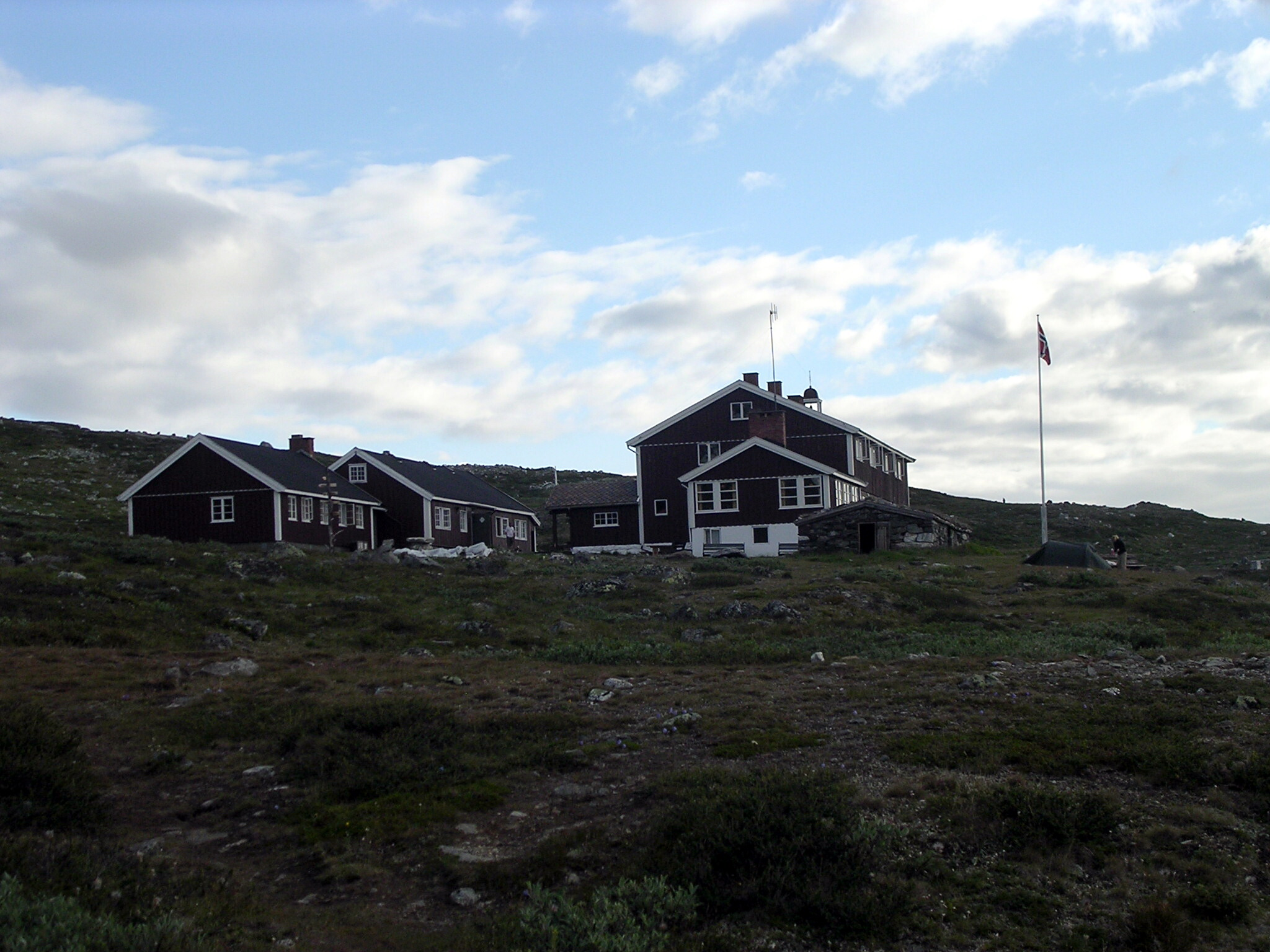
Glitterheim

Glitterheim is a mountain cabin in the valley of Veodalen in Jotunheimen, Norway. It is owned by the Norwegian Mountain Touring Association (DNT). The cabin lies 1,384 meters above sea level, at the foot of the mountain Glittertind. It was designed by architect Hjalmar Welhaven, and built in 1901.
