= Lauvhøe =

Mountain in Innlandet, Norway

- Interactive map of the mountain

Highest point
- Elevation: 1,991 m (6,532 ft)
- Prominence: 567 m (1,860 ft)
- Parent peak: Galdhøpiggen
- Isolation: 4.6 km (2.9 mi) to Trollhøin
- Coordinates: 61°43′41″N 8°27′28″E

Geography
- Location: Innlandet, Norway
- Parent range: Jotunheimen

Lauvhøe is a mountain in Lom Municipality in Innlandet county, Norway. The 1,991-metre (6,532 ft) tall mountain is located in the Jotunheimen mountains. The mountain sits about 11 kilometres (6.8 mi) south of the village of Fossbergom. The mountain is surrounded by several other notable mountains including Eisteinhovde to the northeast, Kvitingskjølen to the east, Finnshalspiggen and Nørdre Trollsteinhøe to the southeast, Galdhøpiggen to the southwest, and Storhøe to the west.

== See also ==
- List of mountains of Norway
