= Trollsteineggje =

Mountain in Innlandet, Norway

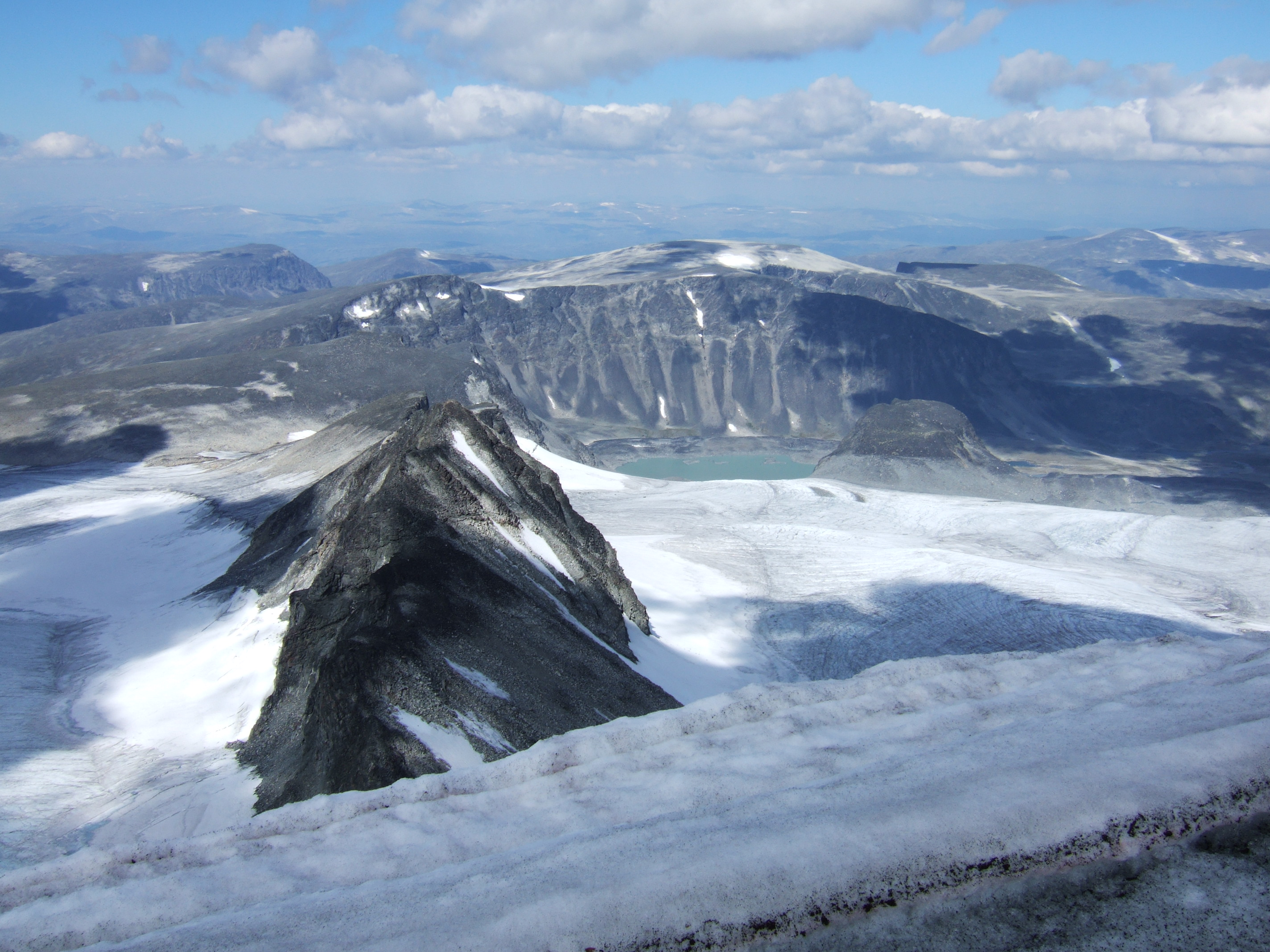
- Trollsteineggje seen from Glittertinden

Highest point
- Elevation: 2,300 m (7,500 ft)
- Prominence: 111 m (364 ft)
- Parent peak: Glittertinden
- Isolation: 0.898 km (0.558 mi)
- Listing: #22 in Norway
- Coordinates: 61°39′37″N 8°33′30″E

Geography
- Interactive map of the mountain
- Location: Innlandet, Norway
- Parent range: Jotunheimen
- Topo map: 1618 III Glittertinden

Trollsteineggje is a mountain in Lom Municipality in Innlandet county, Norway. The 2,300-metre (7,500 ft) tall mountain is the 22nd tallest mountain in Norway. It is located in the Jotunheimen mountains within Jotunheimen National Park. The mountain sits about 20 kilometres (12 mi) south of the village of Fossbergom and about 14 kilometres (8.7 mi) southeast of the village of Elvesæter. The mountain is surrounded by several other notable mountains including Trollsteinrundhøe to the north, Grotbreahesten to the northeast, and Glittertinden to the south.

The population density of the area around Trollseteinseggi is less than 2 inhabitants per square kilometre (5.2/sq mi). The area around Trollsteineggi is almost completely covered with grass. The climate is boreal.

== See also ==
- List of mountains in Norway by height
