= Kvitingskjølen =

Mountain in Innlandet, Norway

- Store Kvitingskjølen
- Interactive map of the mountain

Highest point
- Elevation: 2,064 m (6,772 ft)
- Prominence: 778 m (2,552 ft)
- Isolation: 9 km (5.6 mi) to Trollhøin
- Coordinates: 61°45′46″N 8°44′09″E

Geography
- Location: Innlandet, Norway
- Parent range: Jotunheimen

Kvitingskjølen is a mountain in Lom Municipality in Innlandet county, Norway. The 2,064-metre (6,772 ft) tall mountain is located in the Jotunheimen mountains about 12 kilometres (7.5 mi) southeast of the village of Fossbergom and about 23 kilometres (14 mi) southwest of the village of Vågåmo. The mountain is surrounded by several other notable mountains including Eisteinhovde to the west; Veslkjølen to the northwest; Skarvhøe and Ilvetjørnhøe to the north; Grjothovden, Saukampen, and Liaberget to the east; Heranoshøe to the south; and Store Trollhøin and Finnshalspiggen.

== See also ==
- List of mountains of Norway
