= Finnshalspiggen =

Mountain in Innlandet, Norway

- Finnhalspiggen (historic)
- Interactive map of the mountain

Highest point
- Elevation: 1,800 m (5,900 ft)
- Prominence: 313 m (1,027 ft)
- Parent peak: Glittertinden
- Isolation: 1.3 km (0.81 mi)
- Coordinates: 61°43′15″N 8°35′14″E

Geography
- Location: Innlandet, Norway
- Parent range: Jotunheimen

Finnshalspiggen is a mountain in Lom Municipality in Innlandet county, Norway. The 1,800-metre (5,900 ft) tall mountain is located in the Jotunheimen mountains within Jotunheimen National Park. The mountain sits about 12 kilometres (7.5 mi) south of the village of Fossbergom. The mountain is surrounded by several other notable mountains including Lauvhøe to the northwest, Eisteinhovde to the north, Kvitingskjølen to the northeast, and Nørdre Trollsteinhøe and Gråhøe to the south.

== See also ==
- List of mountains of Norway
