= Veslkjølen =

Mountain in Innlandet, Norway

- Interactive map of the mountain

Highest point
- Elevation: 1,705 m (5,594 ft)
- Prominence: 26 m (85 ft)
- Parent peak: Kvitingskjølen
- Isolation: 0.586 km (0.364 mi)
- Coordinates: 61°47′32″N 8°40′59″E

Geography
- Location: Innlandet, Norway
- Parent range: Jotunheimen

Veslkjølen is a mountain in Lom Municipality in Innlandet county, Norway. The 1,705-metre (5,594 ft) tall mountain is located in the Jotunheimen mountains about 9 kilometres (5.6 mi) southeast of the village of Fossbergom and about 25 kilometres (16 mi) southwest of the village of Vågåmo. The mountain is surrounded by several other notable mountains including Eisteinhovde to the southwest, Skarvhøe to the northeast, Ilvetjørnhøe to the east, Kvitingskjølen to the south, and Finnshalspiggen to the southwest.

== See also ==
- List of mountains of Norway
