= Glittertind =

Mountain in Innlandet, Norway

Glittertinden
- Glittertind (historic)
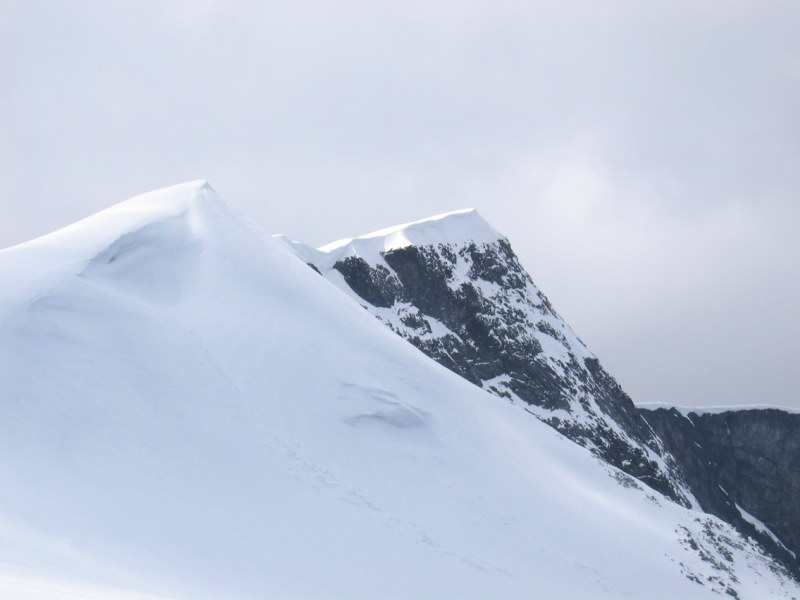
- Glittertind, seen from the east

Highest point
- Elevation: 2,452 m (8,045 ft)
- Prominence: 975 m (3,199 ft)
- Parent peak: Galdhøpiggen
- Isolation: 13 km (8.1 mi) to Galdhøpiggen
- Listing: #2 in Norway
- Coordinates: 61°39′04″N 8°33′27″E

Geography
- Interactive map of the mountain
- Location: Innlandet, Norway
- Parent range: Jotunheimen
- Topo map: 1618 III Glittertinden

Climbing
- First ascent: 1841 (Wergeland, Sletten)
- Easiest route: Hiking

Glittertinden (or historically Glittertind) is a mountain in Lom Municipality in Innlandet county, Norway. The 2,452-metre (8,045 ft) tall mountain is the second highest mountain in Norway. It is located in the Jotunheimen mountains within Jotunheimen National Park. The mountain sits about 22 kilometres (14 mi) southeast of the village of Fossbergom and about 38 kilometres (24 mi) southwest of the village of Vågåmo. The mountain is surrounded by several other notable mountains including Trollsteineggje, Trollsteinrundhøe, and Svartholshøe to the north; Grotbreahesten to the northeast; Veslkjølen to the east; Austre Hestlægerhøe and Nautgardstinden to the southeast; Steinbukampen and Veopallan to the south; and Galdhøpiggen to the west.

== Height ==
The mountain reaches an elevation of 2,452 metres (8,045 ft) without the glacier on top of its peak. As of 2008 it reached 2,465 metres (8,087 ft) above sea level including the glacier, measured as summer minimum. But in August 2022, the mountain was seen basically without the glacier.

Glittertind had earlier been a challenger for the title as the highest mountain in Norway, as measurements showed Glittertind including the glacier was slightly higher than Galdhøpiggen which reaches an elevation of 2,469 metres (8,100 ft) above sea level with no glacier at the summit. In a 1917 official map, the mountain was indicated to be 2,481 metres (8,140 ft). So it was a matter of defining a glacier as a part of a mountain or not. The glacier has, however, shrunk in recent years, and the dispute has been settled in Galdhøpiggen's favour. The summit of Glittertind was reached for the first time in 1841 by Harald Nicolai Storm Wergeland and Hans Sletten.

== Access ==
Glittertind is accessible from Spiterstulen lodge in the west, by a climb of 1,300 metres (4,300 ft), and from Glitterheim lodge in the east, by a climb of about 1,000 metres (3,300 ft). The hike from Glitterheim is the easier, but Glitterheim is inside the Jotunheimen National Park and can therefore only be reached by foot. The summit hike is a popular one, only surpassed in seasonal numbers by Galdhøpiggen, its western neighbor.

The route across the glacier that crowns the summit is completely without crevasses, but on a hot summer day it might be a wet hike across the melting snow which covers the ice. Visitors might even experience that the meltwater blows up across the summit, leaving hikers soaked. The view is magnificent. East and southeast of Glittertind there are hardly any high peaks, and hence most of the northern and eastern parts of Innlandet can be seen. All famous photos of Glittertind are taken on the eastern flank slightly below the top.

There used to be a cabin at the summit, but because of the impossibility of mooring it sufficiently, it was knocked down by a storm and landed on the Grjotbreen glacier, under the steep north wall of the summit.

== Name ==
The mountain is named after the river Glitra and the last element is the finite form of tind (m) which means 'mountain peak'. The name of the river is derived from the verb glitre which means 'glitter' or 'sparkle'.

== Legacy ==
Folk rock band Glittertind is named after the mountain.

== Media gallery ==
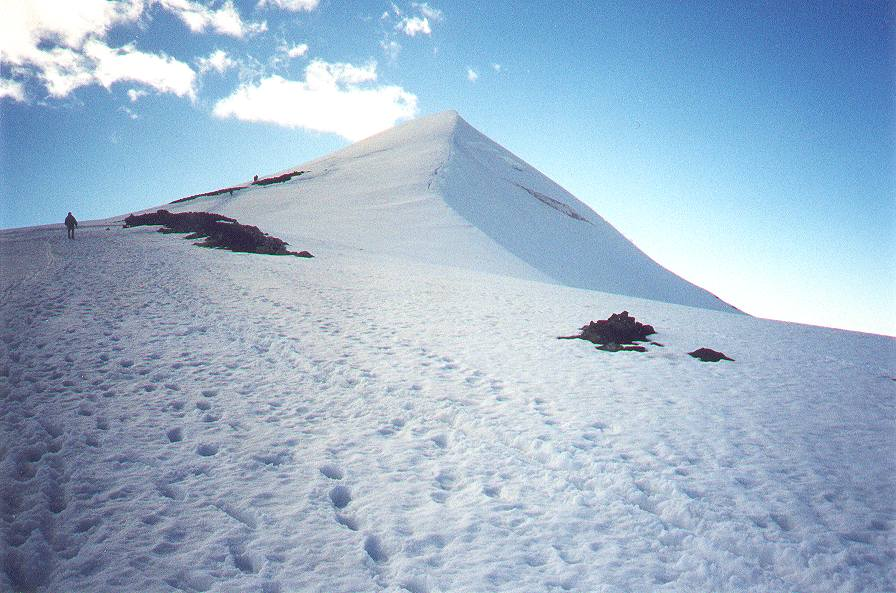
Glittertind seen from east in July 1999.

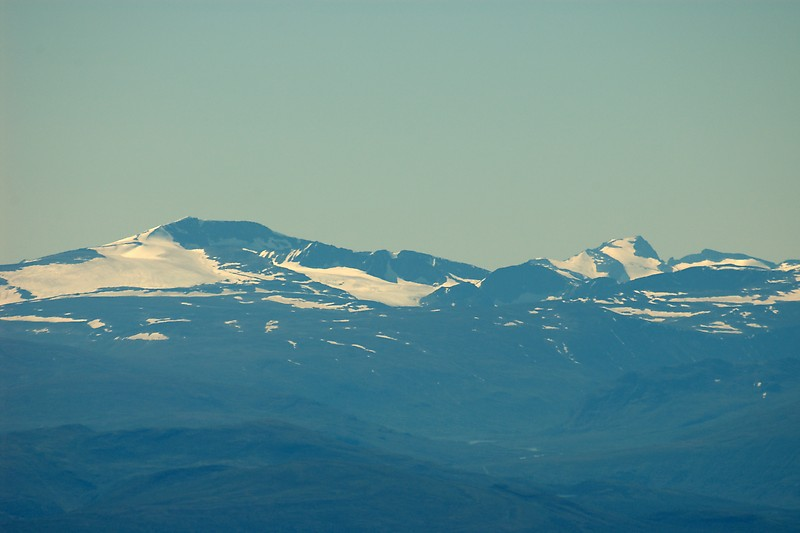
Glittertind (left) seen from Rondeslottet (2,178 m) in Rondane (Summer 2006).

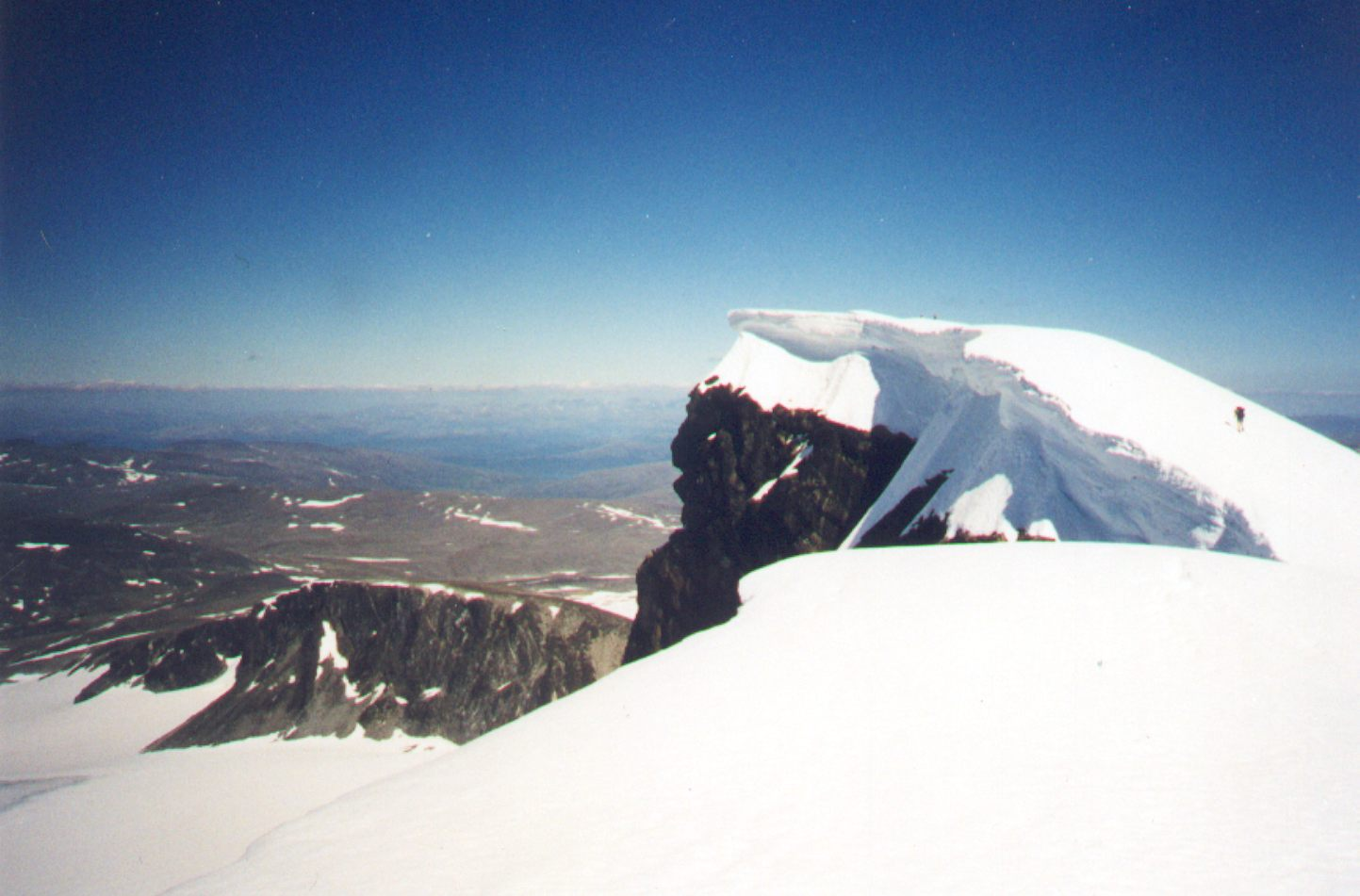
The summit seen from west in July 1999.

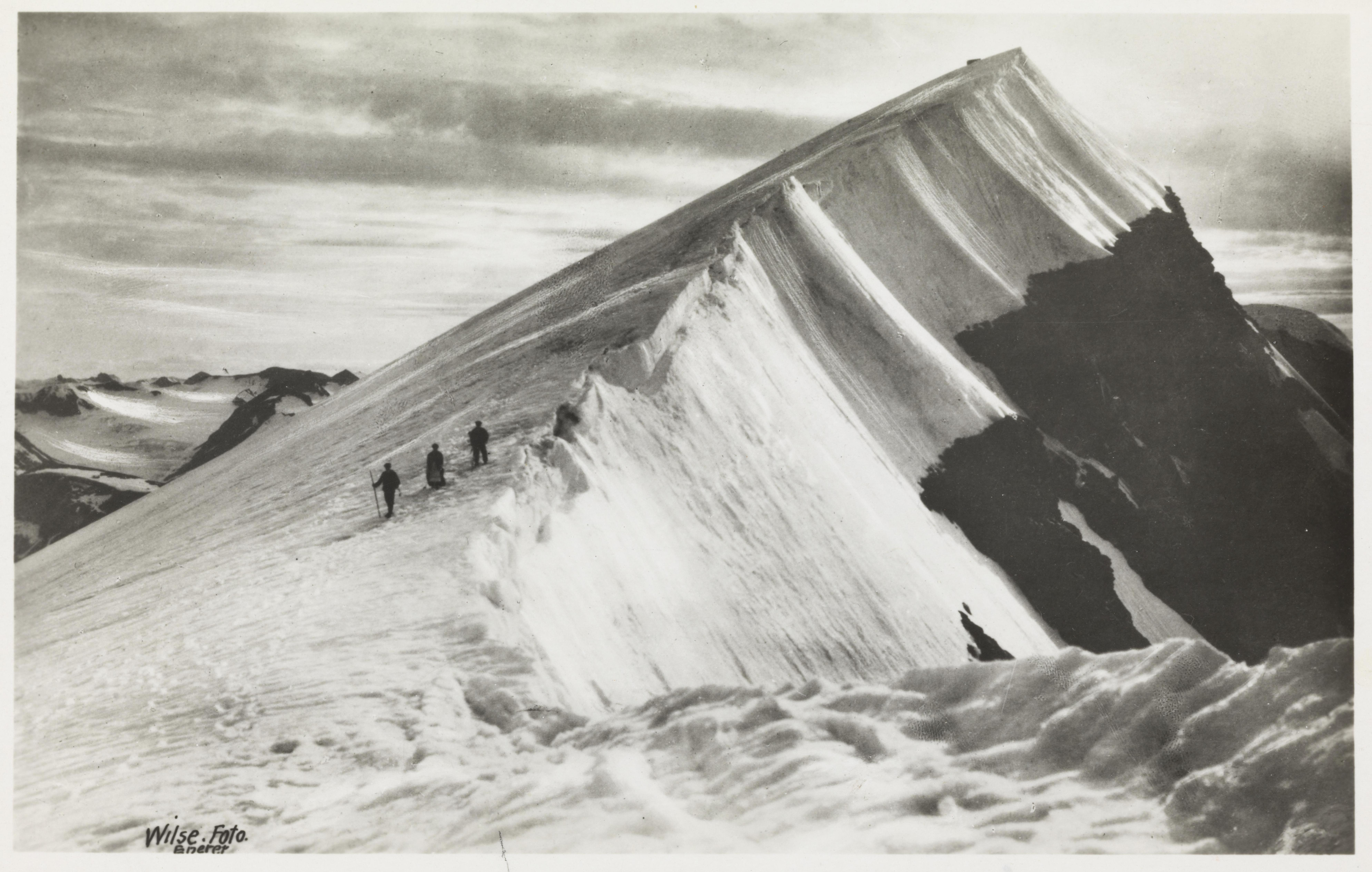
Glittertind in year 1910

== See also ==
- List of mountains of Norway by height
