= Jotunheimen National Park =

National park

- IUCN category II (national park)

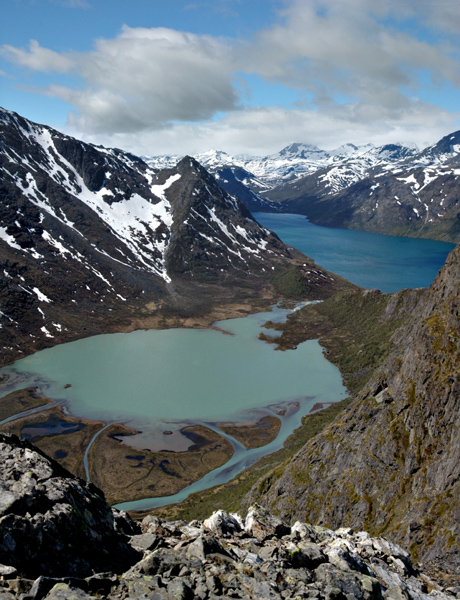
- View from Knutshøi towards central Jotunheimen. Øvre Leirungen is the lake in front, Gjende in the back.
- Interactive map of Jotunheimen National Park
- Location: Vestland and Innlandet, Norway
- Coordinates: 61°30′N 8°22′E
- Area: 1,151 km^{2} (444 sq mi)
- Established: 1980
- Governing body: Directorate for Nature Management

Jotunheimen National Park (Norwegian: Jotunheimen nasjonalpark, lit. 'Home of the Giants') is a national park in Norway, recognized as one of the country's premier hiking and fishing regions. The national park covers 1,151 square kilometres (444 sq mi) and is part of the larger area Jotunheimen. More than 250 peaks rise above an elevation of 1,900 metres (6,200 ft), including Northern Europe's three highest peaks: Galdhøpiggen at 2,469 metres (8,100 ft), Glittertind at 2,452 metres (8,045 ft) and Store Skagastølstind at 2,405 metres (7,890 ft).

The national park covers most of the mountainous region of Jotunheimen, including Hurrungane, but Utladalen and its surroundings are within Utladalen Landscape Protection Area. Geographically, it lies in both Innlandet and Vestland counties. Geologically the Jotunheimen is a Precambrian province. Glaciers have carved the hard gabbro rock massifs of the Jotunheimen, leaving numerous valleys and the many peaks.

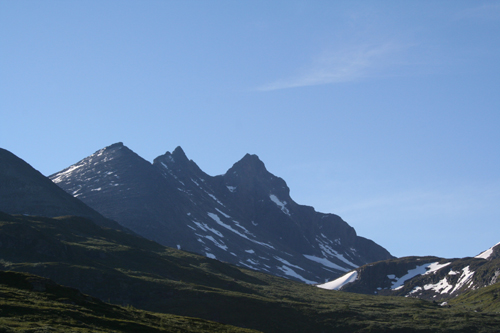
Hurrungane

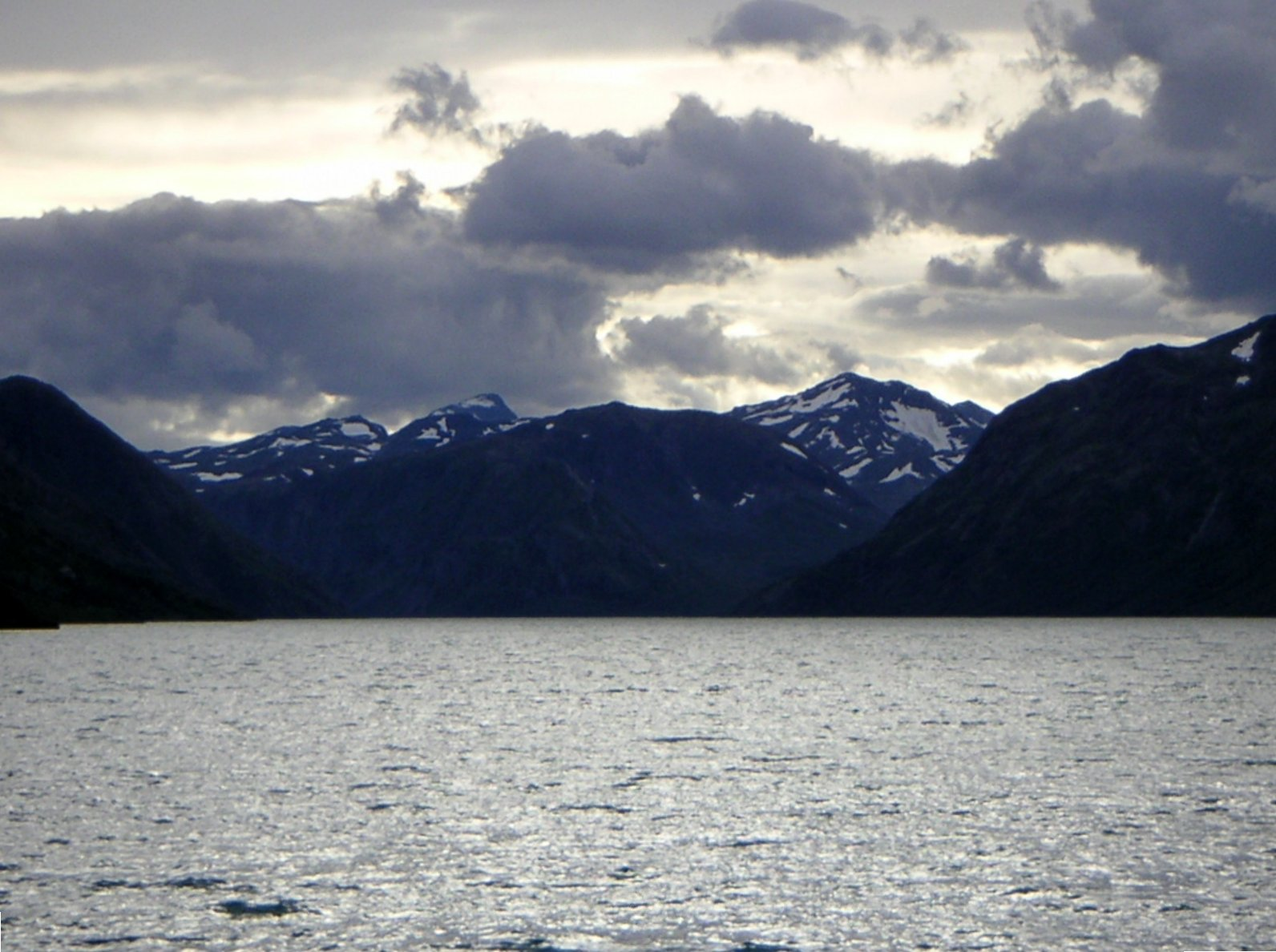
At Gjendesheim, looking over Lake Gjende towards Memurubu

Wildlife in the park include the lynx, moose, Norwegian red deer, reindeer, roe deer, and wolverine. Most lakes and rivers hold trout.

== History ==
Jotunheimen has been the site of hunting since before recorded time. Remains of Stone Age hunting camps have been found near the lakes Gjende and Russvatnet. These remains extend through the bronze and Iron Age, up to recorded times. The high pastures have been used as seters for at least 1000 years.

A "Royal Road" decree from the 15th century required that the residents of Lom must keep the mountain crossing passable to the middle of the Sognefjell, allowing folk from the north Gudbrandsdal access to their trading town of the period, Bergen. Caravans carried farm products down the mountains and returned with salt, iron, cloth and lutefisk.

The name Jotunheimen, or "Home of the Giants" is a relatively recent usage. Aasmund Olavsson Vinje (1818–1879), a famous Norwegian poet and journalist who is remembered for his pioneering use of nynorsk, as well as being an exponent of Norwegian romantic nationalism, coined the term in 1862, adopting it from Keilhau's "Jotunfjellene" or the mountains of the giants. A memorial was raised in 1909 to Aa. O. Vinje at the western end of Lake Bygdin at his dear Eidsbugarden at today's outskirts of the national park where he had a private hut. Old friends and followers wanted to commemorate his contribution to appreciation of Norwegian nature and strengthening of the Norwegian national identity. Today Eidsbugarden appears as a rather large mountain tourist centre, with a newly restored hotel from 1909 that reopened in the summer of 2007, a Norwegian Mountain Touring Association (DNT) cabin and approximately 160 private huts. It can be reached by car or boat in summer and by snowmobile in winter.

In 1869 the DNT built its first hut on the shores of Lake Tyin. Today the DNT's tourist huts make this area one of the best developed touring areas in Europe. There are also a restricted number of private cabins by the lakes.

By Royal Decree in December 1980, a 1,145-square-kilometre (442 sq mi) national park was initially established in the heart of Jotunheimen. It includes much of the best of the region, including the Galdhø plateau, the Glittertind massif, Hurrungane, and the Gjende area. The park links to the Utladalen Nature Reserve, an area of 300 square kilometres (120 sq mi).

=== Archaeological findings ===
In February 2020, Secrets of the Ice Program researchers discovered a 1,500-year-old Viking arrowhead dating back to the Germanic Iron Age and locked in a glacier in southern Norway caused by the climate change in the Jotunheimen Mountains. The arrowhead made of iron was revealed with its cracked wooden shaft and a feather, is 17 cm long and weighs just 28 grams.

== Literary references ==
Jotunheimen is broadly recognized in literature, especially travel books from the 18th Century. The Jotunheim lakes of Gjende and Bygdin are in the center of many of these descriptions.

Literary references include:

- A.O. Vinje's Diktsamling or poetry collection of 1864 celebrated Jotenheimen.
- Frederick Delius’ symphonic poem On the Mountains was sketched while the composer was on a walking holiday with Edvard Grieg and Christian Sinding in the Jotunheim Mountains in 1889.
- Henrik Ibsen's 1867 drama Peer Gynt includes Peer's famous hunt description in the Jotunheim. It is here on the narrow Besseggen Ridge - or perhaps along the Knutshø ridge at the other side of Gjende - that Peer Gynt took his famous wild-reindeer ride along "the Gjendin Ridge".
- Three in Norway, by Two of Them by J.A. Lees and W.J. Clutterbuck, includes extensive passages on three Englishmen's fishing and reindeer hunting experiences in these mountains.

== Traffic ==
Despite the large area of Jotunheimen, there are few roads for car traffic. Between Jotunheimen and Breheimen, the plateau is crossed by the Norwegian County Road 55. To the west, the road continues further from Skjolden via Sogndalsfjøra, Balestrand and Høyanger to the European route E39. In the east, the road leads to Lom. A few small dirt roads lead to different parts of the edge of Jotunheimen National Park, although the area of the national park itself is practically roadless. A small exception, however, is a blind road in the Veodalen to Glitterheim, whose head is inside the national park area near the Glittertind.

== See also ==
- Jotunheimen (mountain range)
- Jötunheimr (mythology)
