= Vesle Knutsholstinden =

Mountain in Innlandet, Norway

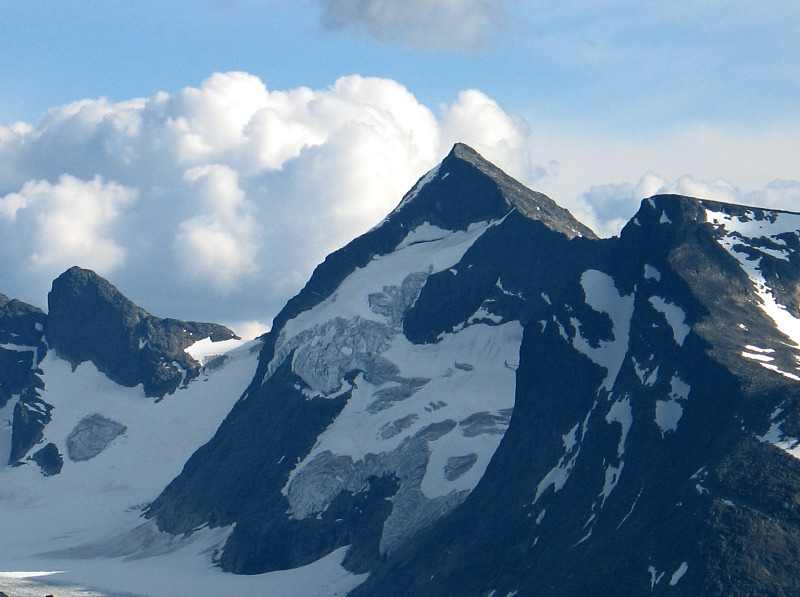
- Store (center) and Vesle Knutsholstinden (on the right)

Highest point
- Elevation: 2,205 m (7,234 ft)
- Prominence: 69 m (226 ft)
- Parent peak: Leirungstinden
- Isolation: 0.265 km (0.165 mi)
- Coordinates: 61°25′06″N 8°34′25″E

Geography
- Interactive map of the mountain
- Location: Innlandet, Norway
- Parent range: Jotunheimen
- Topo map: 1617 IV Gjende

Vesle Knutsholstinden is a mountain in Vågå Municipality in Innlandet county, Norway. The 2,205-metre (7,234 ft) tall mountain is located in the Jotunheimen mountains within Jotunheimen National Park. The mountain sits about 60 kilometres (37 mi) southwest of the village of Vågåmo and about 25 kilometres (16 mi) northwest of the village of Beitostølen. The mountain is surrounded by several other notable mountains including Skarvflytindene to the northeast, Leirungstinden to the east, Leirungskampen to the southeast, Kvitskardtinden and Mesmogtinden to the southwest, Store Svartdalspiggen to the west, and Nordre Knutsholstinden and Store Knutsholstinden to the northwest.

== Name ==
The first element is the genitive of the name of the large gorge Knutsholet. The last element is the finite form of tind which means 'mountain peak'. The name of the gorge is a compound of the male name Knut and hol which means 'hole', 'hollow', or 'gorge'. The reason for the name, and who the person Knut was, is unknown. The prefix vesle means 'small' or 'little'.

== See also ==
- List of mountains of Norway by height
