= Slettmarkhøe =

Mountain in Innlandet, Norway

- Interactive map of the mountain

Highest point
- Elevation: 2,190 m (7,190 ft)
- Prominence: 449 m (1,473 ft)
- Parent peak: Mesmogtinden
- Isolation: 2.4 km (1.5 mi)
- Coordinates: 61°24′27″N 8°28′47″E

Geography
- Location: Innlandet, Norway
- Parent range: Jotunheimen
- Topo map: 1617 IV Gjende

Slettmarkhøe is a mountain in Lom Municipality in Innlandet county, Norway. The 2,190-metre (7,190 ft) tall mountain is located in the Jotunheimen mountains within Jotunheimen National Park. The mountain sits about 37 kilometres (23 mi) northeast of the village of Øvre Årdal and about 27 kilometres (17 mi) northwest of the village of Beitostølen. The mountain is surrounded by several other notable mountains including Store Svartdalspiggen and Mesmogtinden to the east; Langedalstinden, Kvitskardtinden, and Torfinnstindene to the southeast; Slettmarkpiggen and Slettmarkkampen to the southwest; Snøholstinden and Store Rauddalseggje to the northwest; and Storådalshøi to the north.

== See also ==
- List of mountains of Norway by height
