= Tjønnholsoksle =

Mountain in Innlandet, Norway

- Interactive map of the mountain

Highest point
- Elevation: 2,149 m (7,051 ft)
- Prominence: 142 m (466 ft)
- Parent peak: Leirungstinden
- Isolation: 1.1 km (0.68 mi) to Tjørnholstinden
- Coordinates: 61°25′59″N 8°38′14″E

Geography
- Location: Innlandet, Norway
- Parent range: Jotunheimen
- Topo map: 1617 IV Gjende

Tjønnholsoksle is a mountain in Vågå Municipality in Innlandet county, Norway. The 2,149-metre (7,051 ft) tall mountain is located in the Jotunheimen mountains within Jotunheimen National Park. The mountain sits about 50 kilometres (31 mi) southwest of the village of Vågåmo and about 25 kilometres (16 mi) northwest of the village of Beitostølen. The mountain is surrounded by several other notable mountains including Bukkehåmåren, Høgdebrotet, and Eggen to the northeast; Rasletinden to the southeast; Kalvehøgde to the south; Leirungskampen and Leirungstinden to the southwest; Skarvflytindene to the west; and Tjønnholstinden to the north.

== See also ==
- List of mountains of Norway by height
