= Slettmarkpiggen =

Mountain in Innlandet, Norway

- Interactive map of the mountain

Highest point
- Elevation: 2,163 m (7,096 ft)
- Prominence: 138 m (453 ft)
- Parent peak: Slettmarkhøe
- Isolation: 0.671 km (0.417 mi) to Slettmarkhøe
- Coordinates: 61°23′51″N 8°27′58″E

Geography
- Location: Innlandet, Norway
- Parent range: Jotunheimen
- Topo map: 1517 I Tyin

Slettmarkpiggen is a mountain on the border of Vang Municipality and Lom Municipality in Innlandet county, Norway. The 2,163-metre (7,096 ft) tall mountain is located in the Jotunheimen mountains within Jotunheimen National Park. The mountain sits about 37 kilometres (23 mi) northeast of the village of Øvre Årdal and about 27 kilometres (17 mi) northwest of the village of Beitostølen. The mountain is surrounded by several other notable mountains including Store Svartdalspiggen to the northeast; Mesmogtinden, Langedalstinden, Kvitskardtinden, and Torfinnstindene to the east; Galdeberget and Uksedalshøe to the southwest; Slettmarkkampen to the west; Snøholstinden and Store Rauddalseggje to the northwest; and Storådalshøe to the north.

== See also ==
- List of mountains of Norway by height
