= Uksedalshøe =

Mountain in Innlandet, Norway

- Oksedalshøi (unofficial)
- Interactive map of the mountain

Highest point
- Elevation: 1,688 m (5,538 ft)
- Prominence: 68 m (223 ft)
- Parent peak: Mesmogtinden
- Isolation: 1.1 km (0.68 mi)
- Coordinates: 61°23′16″N 8°24′16″E

Geography
- Location: Innlandet, Norway
- Parent range: Jotunheimen
- Topo map: 1517 I Tyin

Uksedalshøe is a mountain in Vang Municipality in Innlandet county, Norway. The 1,688-metre (5,538 ft) tall mountain is located about 30 kilometres (19 mi) northwest of the village of Vang i Valdres. The mountain is surrounded by several other notable mountains including Høgbrøthøgde to the northwest, Slettmarkkampen and Slettmarkpiggen to the northeast, and Galdeberget to the east. The lake Bygdin lies to the south of the mountain.

== See also ==
- List of mountains of Norway by height
