= Galdeberget =

Mountain in Innlandet, Norway

- Interactive map of the mountain

Highest point
- Elevation: 2,075 m (6,808 ft)
- Prominence: 415 m (1,362 ft)
- Parent peak: Mesmogtinden
- Isolation: 2 km (1.2 mi) to Slettmarkpiggen
- Coordinates: 61°22′39″N 8°25′38″E

Geography
- Location: Innlandet, Norway
- Parent range: Jotunheimen
- Topo map: 1517 I Tyin

Galdeberget is a mountain in Vang Municipality in Innlandet county, Norway. The 2,075-metre (6,808 ft) tall mountain is located in the Jotunheimen mountains on the north shore of the lake Bygdin, about 30 kilometres (19 mi) northwest of the village of Vang i Valdres. The mountain is surrounded by several other notable mountains including Uksedalshøe to the southwest, Snøholstinden and Høgbrøthøgde to the northwest, Slettmarkkampen and Slettmarkpiggen to the north, Langedalstinden to the northeast, and Torfinnstindane and Nørdre Kalvehølotinden to the east.

== See also ==
- List of mountains of Norway by height
