= Langeskavlen =

Mountain in Innlandet, Norway

- Interactive map of the mountain

Highest point
- Elevation: 1,878 m (6,161 ft)
- Prominence: 138 m (453 ft)
- Parent peak: Uranostinden
- Isolation: 2.2 km (1.4 mi)
- Coordinates: 61°24′16″N 8°12′53″E

Geography
- Location: Innlandet, Norway
- Parent range: Jotunheimen
- Topo map: 1517 I Tyin

Langeskavlen is a mountain in Vang Municipality in Innlandet county, Norway. The 1,878-metre (6,161 ft) tall mountain is located in the Jotunheimen mountains and on the border of the Jotunheimen National Park. The mountain sits about 22 kilometres (14 mi) north of the village of Tyinkrysset. The mountain is surrounded by several other notable mountains including Falketinden to the west, Uranostinden and Langeskavltinden to the northwest, Storegut and Høgbrøthøgde to the northeast, and Galdeberget and Slettmarkpiggen to the east.

== See also ==
- List of mountains of Norway by height
