= Uranostinden =

Mountain in Innlandet, Norway

- Urdanostinden (unofficial)
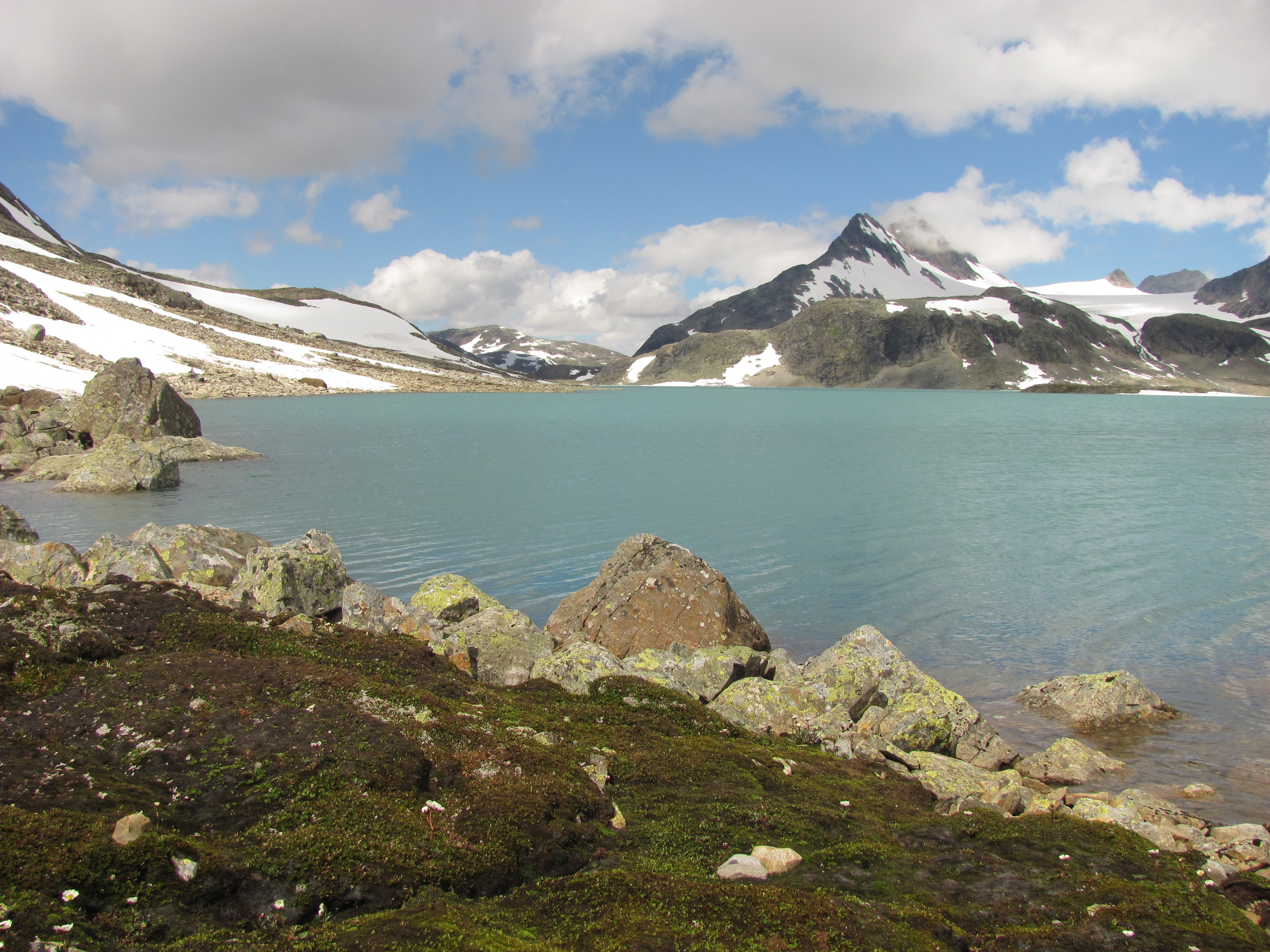
- Kvitevatnet and Uranostinden in summer

Highest point
- Elevation: 2,157 m (7,077 ft)
- Prominence: 703 m (2,306 ft)
- Isolation: 7.8 km (4.8 mi) to Store Rauddalseggje
- Coordinates: 61°25′36″N 8°09′01″E

Geography
- Interactive map of the mountain
- Location: Innlandet and Vestland, Norway
- Parent range: Jotunheimen
- Topo map: 1517 I Tyin

Uranostinden is a mountain in Norway. The peak marks the tri-point border between Luster Municipality, Årdal Municipality (both in Vestland county), and Vang Municipality (in Innlandet county). The 2,157-metre (7,077 ft) tall mountain is located in the Jotunheimen mountains and inside the Jotunheimen National Park. The mountain sits about 40 kilometres (25 mi) northwest of the village of Vang i Valdres and about 22 kilometres (14 mi) northeast of the village of Øvre Årdal. The mountain is surrounded by several other notable mountains including Mjølkedalstinden to the northeast, Langeskavltinden and Storegut to the east, Langeskavlen to the southeast, and Falketind to the southwest. There is a large glacier located on the east side of the mountain.

== See also ==
- List of mountains of Norway by height
