= Storegut =

Mountain in Innlandet, Norway

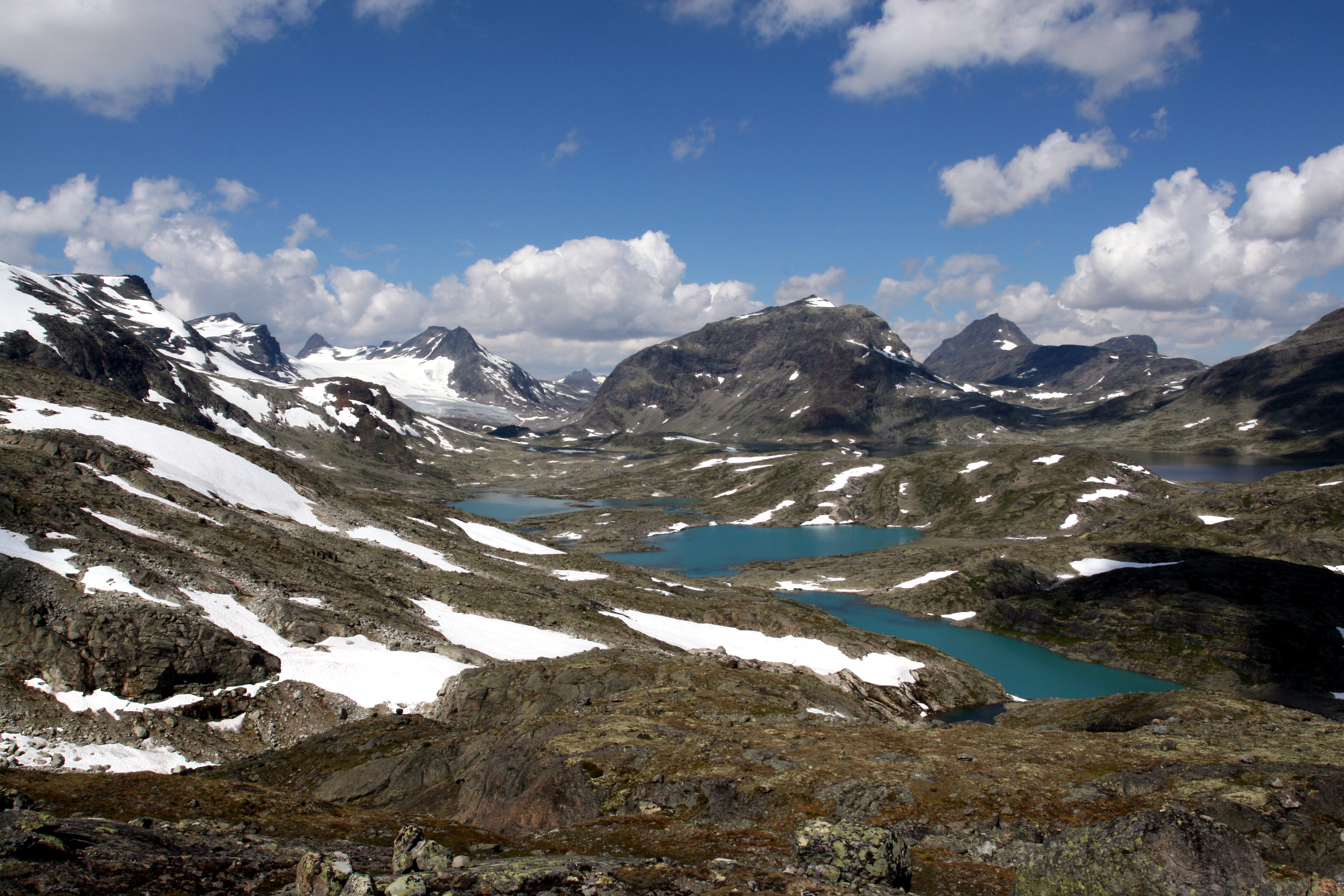
- Storegut in the middle

Highest point
- Elevation: 1,962 m (6,437 ft)
- Prominence: 461 m (1,512 ft)
- Parent peak: Mjølkedalstinden
- Isolation: 3.1 km (1.9 mi) to Mjølkedalstinden
- Coordinates: 61°25′49″N 8°14′25″E

Geography
- Interactive map of the mountain
- Location: Innlandet and Vestland, Norway
- Parent range: Jotunheimen
- Topo map: 1517 I Tyin

Storegut is a mountain on the border of Vang Municipality in Innlandet county and Luster Municipality in Vestland county, Norway. The 1,962-metre (6,437 ft) tall mountain is located in the Jotunheimen mountains and inside the Jotunheimen National Park. The mountain sits about 25 kilometres (16 mi) north of the village of Tyinkrysset. The mountain is surrounded by several other notable mountains including Uranostinden and Langeskavltinden to the west, Langeskavlen to the southwest, Høgbrøthøgde to the east, and Snøholstinden and Store Rauddalseggje to the northeast.

== Name ==
The name is a compound word made up of stor which means 'big' and gut which means 'boy', therefore together, the name means "Big Boy". It is common to compare mountains with persons in many Norwegian place names.

== See also ==
- List of mountains of Norway by height
