= Vinjerock =

Rock festival in Norway

Coordinates: 61°22′26″N 8°17′51″E

Vinjerock is a rock festival held each summer at 1,060 metres above sea level, at Eidsbugarden in the Jotunheimen area in southern Norway.

The festival was arranged for the first time on 4 and 5 August 2006, with artists as Dumdum Boys, Thomas Dybdahl, Minor Majority and The Blackbirds on stage. In 2007, artists like BigBang, Sivert Høyem, Adjágas and Blood, Sweat & Tears played at the festival.

Vinjerock got its name from the famous Norwegian poet, Aasmund Olavsson Vinje, who built the first cabin at Eidsbugarden, and gave the surrounding mountains their name, Jotunheimen.

There was not a festival in 2011. To allow the grounds to be expanded thus protecting the vulnerable mountain nature of the area, the organizers received funds in 2008 earmarked the establishment of a park on the banks if the river Bygdin. There was a festival that took place between 19 - 21 July 2012. In addition, the 2019 festival took place July 18, 2019 – July 20, 2019 and included ten bands playing a set list of 10-14 songs per band.

Location
Year
Featured artists
Eidsbugarden, Norway
2019

   ISÁK       Moon Hooch
   Kickslip   AURORA
   Sigrid     Vinjefolk
   Real Ones  Silje & Herkules
   Boy Pablo  Karpe

Jotunheimen, Norway
2018

  BigBang      Cezinando
  Trygve Skaug Silvana Imam
  Sløtface     Fieh
  Silja Sol    Fay Wildhagen
