= Kalvehøgde =

Mountain in Innlandet, Norway

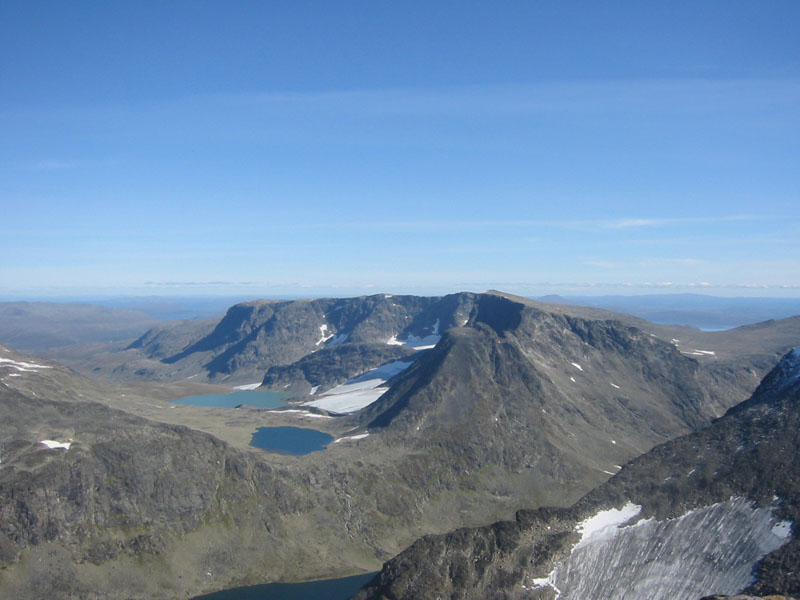
- View of Kalvehøgde, September 2005

Highest point
- Elevation: 2,209 m (7,247 ft)
- Prominence: 528 m (1,732 ft)
- Parent peak: Knutsholstinden
- Isolation: 3.3 km (2.1 mi) to Vestre Leirungstinden
- Coordinates: 61°23′34″N 8°37′14″E

Geography
- Interactive map of the mountain
- Location: Innlandet, Norway
- Parent range: Jotunheimen
- Topo map: 1617 IV Gjende

Climbing
- First ascent: 1820 (Balthazar Mathias Keilhau, Peter Christian Bianco Boeck)
- Easiest route: Hike or ski

Kalvehøgde is a mountain group in Vågå Municipality and Vang Municipality in Innlandet county, Norway. The 2,209-metre (7,247 ft) tall mountain is located in the Jotunheimen mountains. The mountain sits about 60 kilometres (37 mi) southwest of the village of Vågåmo and about 20 kilometres (12 mi) northwest of the village of Beitostølen. The mountain is surrounded by several other notable mountains including Rasletinden to the east; Tjønnholstinden and Tjønnholsoksle to the north; Skarvflytindene, Leirungskampen, and Austre Leirungstinden to the northwest; and Torfinnstindene to the west.

Kalvehøgde is a 10-kilometre (6.2 mi) long massif in the southernmost part of the Jotunheimen mountain range. The northern part of the massif lies within Jotunheimen National Park. The massif rises quite slowly from lake Bygdin, and ends in an extremely steep wall to the north. The wall is about 500 to 700 metres (1,600 to 2,300 ft) high. On the northern side of the massif, there are several glaciers, with Leirungsbrean as the greatest. On the southern slopes there are two smaller glaciers - the Kalveholobrean glaciers. All the glaciers have retreated in the later years.

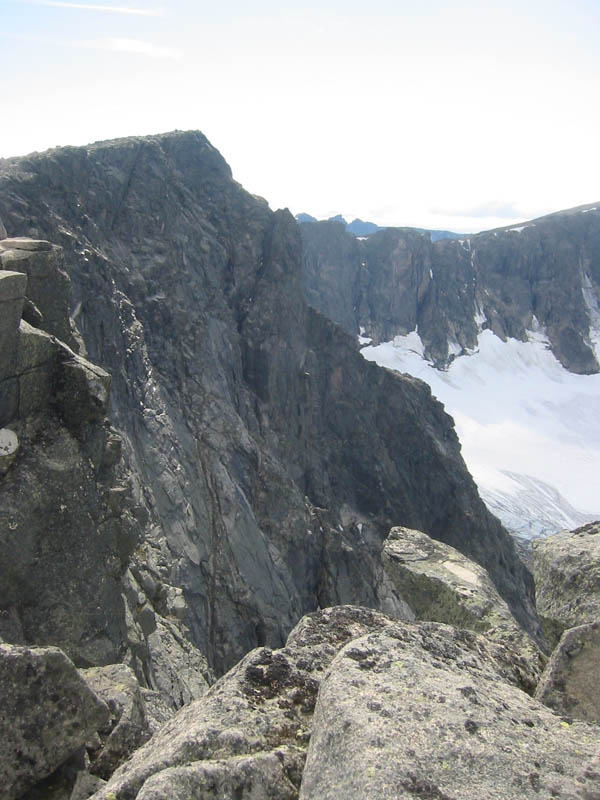
Eastern Kalvehøgde and the wall of Western seen from Mugna.

The massif contains ten 2,000-metre (6,600 ft) summits, but the northwesternmost (in the foreground on the photo to the right) and the two easternmost (not visible) are normally seen as independent mountains. The prominence of most of the summits are less than 100 metres (330 ft), and most of the massif is a broad ridge or a plateau which makes it very popular among mountain skiers. The proximity to the Norwegian County Road 51 adds to the popularity, and the massif is one of the definitely most visited in Jotunheimen.

Because of the number of summits, there has been a need for more distinct names for all the seven summits, and the National Map Institute has decided upon the name Munken (the Monk) for the northeastern plateau - seen in the lowermost picture, Mugna (probably meaning huge) for the two central summits, Kalvehøgde (reindeer calf mountain) for the three western summits, and lastly Nordre Kalveholotind (northern reindeer calf hole peak) for the southwestern summit, which is the only summit which has a prominent, steep wall on the southern side of the massif.

The massif is built mostly by gabbro rocks, a very hard and resistant rock. The southern slopes and the plateaus consist mostly of talus, and there is very little plant life except lichen, moss and Ranunculus glacialis. Snow buntings and ptarmigan are frequent and reindeer can be seen, but they mostly prefer the grassy slopes down towards lake Bygdin.

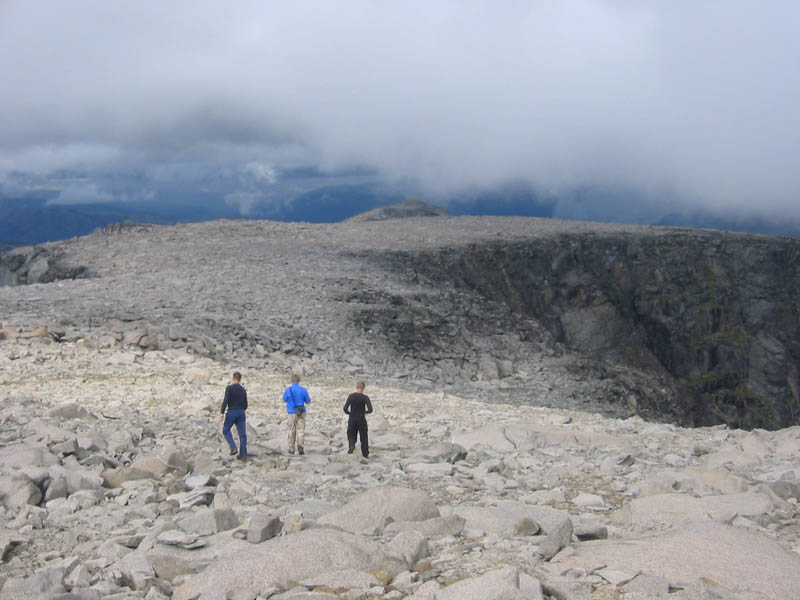
Munken - the flattest part of the plateau.

The Eastern Kalvehøgde and the Mugna summit were both climbed in 1820 by the two students Balthazar Mathias Keilhau and Peter Christian Bianco Boeck, both later prominent scientists at the university of Christiania. This is considered to be the first real mountain expedition in Norwegian history, and these summits were the first to be climbed by the two friends. The rest of the summits have unknown first ascents.

== Hiking guide ==
The massif is easily accessible from National Route 51 crossing the Valdresflyi plateau. You reach the two summits of Rasletind, which is part of the massif but considered being a separate mountain. From the summit of the greater Rasletinden, the massif can be followed as far as Western Kalvehøgde, which is the highest summit with an elevation of 2208 m, but west of that summit, the plateau soon turns into a very steep and narrow edge, which needs equipment to be climbed. The southwestern summit of Nordre Kalveholotind and the northeastern summit of Munken branches off from the main massif, and they can be reached easily from the main massif. Mostly the massif is also easily accessible from lake Bygdin, but that constitutes a rather long hike along the lake. From Torfinnsbu, where the boat Bitihorn has a landing, the massif can also be reached after a rather strenuous and steep hike.

The views from all the summits are great - since the massif is the southernmost and easternmost in Jotunheimen.

== Name ==
The first element is kalv which means 'calf' (of a reindeer). The last element is the finite form of høgd which means 'height' or 'mountain'.

== See also ==
- List of mountains of Norway by height
