= Nørdre Kalvehølotinden =

Mountain in Innlandet, Norway

- Interactive map of the mountain

Highest point
- Elevation: 2,019 m (6,624 ft)
- Prominence: 108 m (354 ft)
- Parent peak: Kalvehøgde
- Isolation: 1.3 km (0.81 mi)
- Coordinates: 61°22′16″N 8°37′52″E

Geography
- Location: Innlandet, Norway
- Parent range: Jotunheimen

Nørdre Kalvehølotinden is a mountain in Vang Municipality in Innlandet county, Norway. The 2,019-metre (6,624 ft) tall mountain is located about 28 kilometres (17 mi) north of the village of Vang i Valdres. It is the 165th tallest peak in Norway. The mountain is surrounded by several other notable mountains including Raslet and Rasletinden to the northeast, Kalvehøgde to the north, and Torfinnstindane to the northwest. The lake Bygdin lies just south of the mountain.

== See also ==
- List of mountains of Norway by height
