= Store Svartdalspiggen =

Mountain in Innlandet, Norway

- Interactive map of the mountain

Highest point
- Elevation: 2,174 m (7,133 ft)
- Prominence: 178 m (584 ft)
- Parent peak: Mesmogtinden
- Isolation: 1.7 km (1.1 mi)
- Coordinates: 61°25′02″N 8°30′47″E

Geography
- Location: Innlandet, Norway
- Parent range: Jotunheimen
- Topo map: 1617 IV Gjende

Store Svartdalspiggen is a mountain on the border of Vågå Municipality and Lom Municipality in Innlandet county, Norway. The 2,174-metre (7,133 ft) tall mountain is located in the Jotunheimen mountains within Jotunheimen National Park. The mountain sits about 37 kilometres (23 mi) northeast of the village of Øvre Årdal (in Årdal Municipality) and about 27 kilometres (17 mi) northwest of the village of Beitostølen. The mountain is surrounded by several other notable mountains including Knutsholstinden and Leirungstinden to the east; Langedalstinden, Kvitskardtinden, and Torfinnstindene to the southeast; Slettmarkpiggen, Slettmarkhøe, and Slettmarkkampen to the southwest; Snøholstinden and Store Rauddalseggi to the northwest; and Storådalshøi and Høgtunga to the north.

== See also ==
- List of mountains of Norway by height
