= Nordre Knutsholstinden =

Mountain in Innlandet, Norway

Nordre Knutsholstinden Knutsholstinden
- Interactive map of the mountain

Highest point
- Elevation: 2,185 m (7,169 ft)
- Prominence: 80 m (260 ft)
- Parent peak: Knutsholstinden
- Isolation: 0.834 km (0.518 mi)
- Coordinates: 61°26′11″N 8°33′18″E

Geography
- Location: Innlandet, Norway
- Parent range: Jotunheimen
- Topo map: 1617 IV Gjende

Nordre Knutsholstinden or simply Knutsholstinden is a mountain in Vågå Municipality in Innlandet county, Norway. The 2,185-metre (7,169 ft) tall mountain is located in the Jotunheimen mountains within Jotunheimen National Park. The mountain sits about 60 kilometres (37 mi) southwest of the village of Vågåmo and about 25 kilometres (16 mi) northwest of the village of Beitostølen. The mountain is surrounded by several other notable mountains including Skarvflytindene to the east; Leirungstinden, Vesle Knutsholstinden, and Store Knutsholstinden to the southeast; and Store Svartdalspiggen to the southwest.

== Name ==
The first element is the genitive of the name of the large gorge Knutsholet. The last element is the definite form of tind which means 'mountain peak'. The name of the gorge is a compound of the male name Knut and hol which means 'hole', 'hollow', or 'gorge'. The reason for the name, and who the person Knut was, is unknown. The prefix nordre means 'northern'.

== See also ==
- List of mountains of Norway by height
