= Dølen =

Norwegian literary magazine (1858–1870)

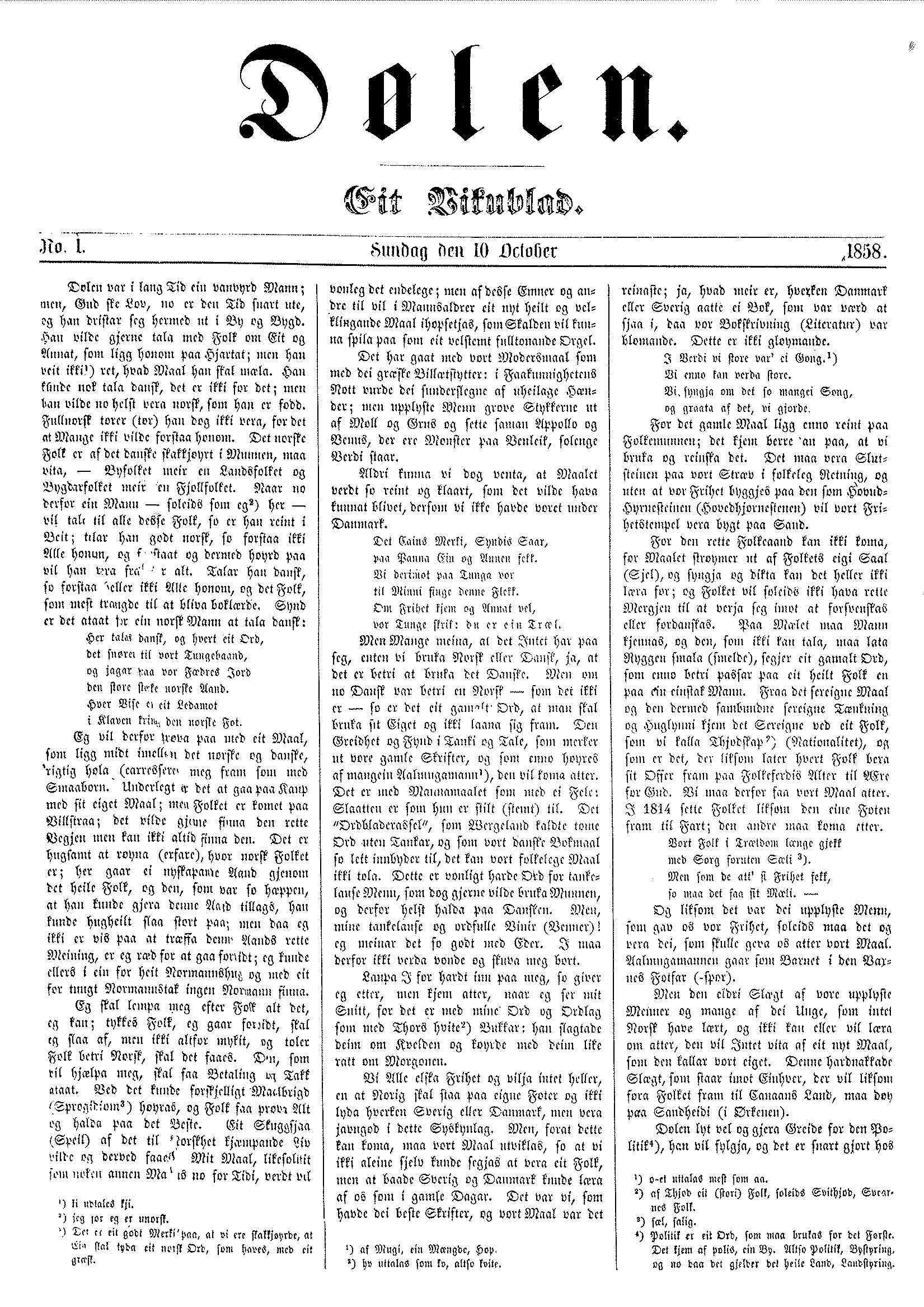
- First page of first edition of Dølen, 1858
- Editor: Aasmund Olavsson Vinje
- Categories: literature, language
- Frequency: weekly
- Founded: 1858
- Final issue: 1870
- Country: Norway
- Language: Nynorsk language (Norwegian)

Dølen (meaning The Dalesman in English) is a former Norwegian weekly literary magazine published in Norway between 1858 and 1870.

== History and profile ==
Dølen was established by Aasmund Olavson Vinje in 1858. The first issue is dated 10 October 1858. It came out weekly, but there were shorter and longer periods when the magazine did not appear. The last issue appeared on 24 July 1870. Vinje died on 30 July 1870.

Several of Vinje's literary works were first published in the magazine. He also published articles on travel, and editorial comments on art, language, and politics. He also wrote philosophical essays for the magazine. However, the most significant function of Vinje in his magazine was his help in developing a new rural variant of the Norwegian language known as New Norwegian, or Nynorsk.

A facsimile edition of the magazine was issued between 1970 and 1973.
