= Langeskavltinden =

Mountain in Innlandet, Norway

- Langeskavlstinden (unofficial)
- Interactive map of the mountain

Highest point
- Elevation: 2,014 m (6,608 ft)
- Prominence: 203 m (666 ft)
- Parent peak: Uranostinden
- Isolation: 1.4 km (0.87 mi)
- Coordinates: 61°25′40″N 8°10′43″E

Geography
- Location: Innlandet, Norway
- Parent range: Jotunheimen
- Topo map: 1517 I Tyin

Langeskavltinden is a mountain in Vang Municipality in Innlandet county, Norway. The 2,014-metre (6,608 ft) tall mountain is located in the Jotunheimen mountains and inside the Jotunheimen National Park. The mountain sits about 40 kilometres (25 mi) northwest of the village of Vang i Valdres and about 22 kilometres (14 mi) northeast of the village of Øvre Årdal. The mountain is surrounded by several other notable mountains including Uranostinden to the west, Storegut to the east, Høgbrøthøgde and Langeskavlen to the southeast, and Falketinden to the southwest. The mountain has a large glacier located on its west, north, and east sides.

== See also ==
- List of mountains of Norway by height
