= Skarvflytindene =

Mountain in Innlandet, Norway

- Interactive map of the mountain

Highest point
- Elevation: 2,154 m (7,067 ft)
- Parent peak: Leirungstinden
- Coordinates: 61°26′00″N 8°36′35″E

Geography
- Location: Innlandet, Norway
- Parent range: Jotunheimen
- Topo map: 1617 IV Gjende

Skarvflytindene is a mountain group in Vågå Municipality in Innlandet county, Norway. The 2,154-metre (7,067 ft) tall mountain is located in the Jotunheimen mountains within Jotunheimen National Park. The mountain sits about 60 kilometres (37 mi) southwest of the village of Vågåmo and about 25 kilometres (16 mi) northwest of the village of Beitostølen. The mountain is surrounded by several other notable mountains including Tjønnholstinden and Tjønnholsoksle to the east, Rasletinden and Kalvehøgde to the southeast, Leirungskampen and Leirungstinden to the southwest, and Knutsholstinden and Nordre Knutsholstinden to the west.

The mountain group consists of three peaks: Nørdre Skarvflytinden, at 2,073 metres (6,801 ft), Midtre Skarvflytinden, at 2,154 metres (7,067 ft) and Søre Skarvflytinden, at 2,210 metres (7,250 ft).

== See also ==
- List of mountains of Norway by height
