= Rasletinden =

Mountain in Innlandet, Norway

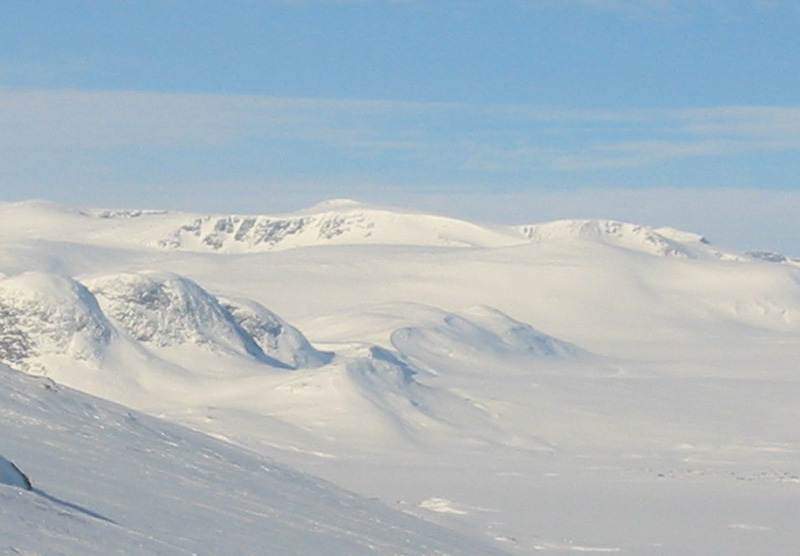
- Rasletind seen from southeast, February 2004

Highest point
- Elevation: 2,105 m (6,906 ft)
- Prominence: 109 m (358 ft)
- Parent peak: Kalvehøgde
- Isolation: 1.6 km (0.99 mi) to Mugna
- Coordinates: 61°23′43″N 8°41′58″E

Geography
- Interactive map of the mountain
- Location: Innlandet, Norway
- Parent range: Jotunheimen
- Topo map: 1617 IV Gjende

Climbing
- Easiest route: Hiking or Skiing

Rasletinden is a mountain on the border of Vang Municipality and Vågå Municipality in Innlandet county, Norway. The 2,105-metre (6,906 ft) tall mountain is located in the Jotunheimen mountains within Jotunheimen National Park. The mountain sits about 60 kilometres (37 mi) southwest of the village of Vågåmo and about 15 kilometres (9.3 mi) northwest of the village of Beitostølen. The mountain is surrounded by several other notable mountains including Gråhøi to the east; Bukkehåmåren, Høgdebrotet, and Eggen to the north; Tjønnholstinden and Tjønnholsoksle to the northwest; and Kalvehøgde and Leirungskampen to the west.

View from the main summit in the northerly direction.

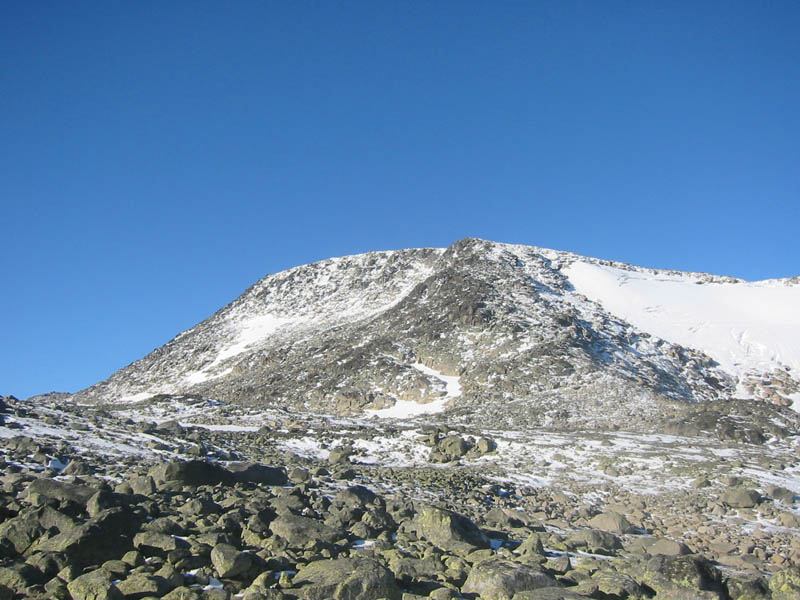
Øystre Rasletind seen from Steindalen valley to the southeast.

The mountain has two main summits, named Øystre Rasletind and Rasletind. The higher summit reaches an elevation of 2,105 metres (6,906 ft) above sea level. It is located on the border between Vang Municipality and Vågå Municipality. The secondary peak reaches an elevation of 2,010 metres (6,590 ft) above sea level a little further to the east. That peak forms a tripoint for the municipal borders of Vang, Vågå, and Øystre Slidre municipalities. This mountain forms the southeasternmost edge of the Jotunheimen mountains. The mountain is situated on the western side of the Valdresflye high mountain plains. The mountain is the eastern end of the long east-west Kalvehøgde massif. The summit can be observed from most of the mountain areas south and east of Jotunheimen. Both summits are located close to the main road Norwegian County Road 51 which runs across Valdresflye.

The mountain is among the furthest south of all the 2,000-metre (6,600 ft) peaks in Norway and it is made of the extremely hard gabbro rock. The gabbro in Rasletind is of the normal "gray-with-black-specs" variety which can easily be observed on the slopes that are covered with snow most of the year and gives no support to lichen colonies. The view from the summits is one of the best in southern Norway. On a clear day, you can see almost as far as Oslo. You can see the Rondane range to the east-northeast and the Dovrefjell range to the north. Due south you see the summit of the beacon of Øystre Slidre Municipality, Bitihorn, and you also see the lakes of Vinstri and Bygdin.

== Name ==
The name probably derives from the Norwegian word for rumble "rasle" - the sound of stones falling down. The south wall of the summits is steep, so this makes the rumble-theory even more plausible. The name is also found in the tarn south of the summits and the smaller summit on the south end of the plain south of the summits is called Raslet. The eastern peak is called Øystre Rasletind ('øystre' means 'eastern').

== Climbing ==
The mountain peaks are among the most easily available 2,000-metre (6,600 ft) summits in Norway, particularly since they are located so close to a main road. Because of this, it has been impossible to establish who was first to first reach the summits.

The eastern and western summits can be reached after an easy hike, which, dependent on the choice of directness of the route will be of varying steepness. The following is a brief description of the trip. From the Youth Hostel at the highest point along County Road 51, hike directly towards the eastern summit. There are traces of a path on the wet meadows on the south shore of lake Fisketjørni. Shortly after you leave the small lake, the very even route starts to climb, and you will not be able to see the summits any more.

Walk in a northwesterly direction until you reach the shoulder of the Raslet mountain. From here you can choose to hike directly towards the steep southeastern ridge. This ridge needs no equipment to be climbed, but it is steep. The easier choice is to hike towards the pass between the Eastern summit and the small summit on its eastern ridge. From here it is a rocky, but an easy hike to the summit. From the extremely flat eastern summit, it is easy to spot the route to the main summit. This short hike is no challenge except that it is rocky.

The greatest number of people climb the hikes in April and May after the County Route 51 has opened again after winter. On a sunny Saturday or Sunday you will never walk alone, and the number of alternative routes is higher than in summer. Many hikers will continue on from Rasletinden to the Kalvehøgde summits.

== See also ==
- List of mountains of Norway by height
