= Eidsbugarden =

Tourist center in Vang municipality, Norway

Coordinates: 61°22′32.2″N 8°17′57.5″E

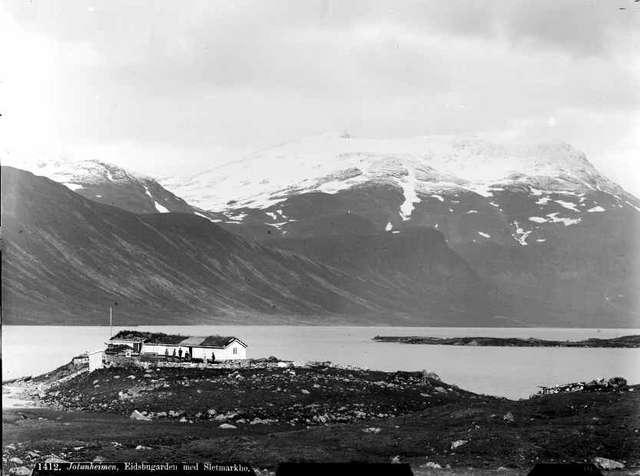
Eidsbugarden by lake Bygdin, Vang, Norway.

Eidsbugarden is a tourist center which lies at the western end of Lake Bygdin in the Jotunheimen mountain range on the outskirts of Jotunheim National Park in Innlandet, Norway. Eidsbugarden lies to the southeast in Jotunheim.

A memorial was raised in 1959 to the Norwegian poet Aasmund Olavsson Vinje at Eidsbugarden where he had a private hut. Friends and followers commemorated his contribution to appreciation of Norwegian nature and strengthening of the Norwegian national identity.

Today Eidsbugarden is a rather large mountain tourist centre, with a hotel from 1909, restored in 2006, a Norwegian Mountain Touring Association (DNT) cabin and approximately 160 private huts (cabins).

Along the lake there are several tourist huts –on the west end lies Eidsbugarden, on the north side lies Torfinnsbu and on the east side lies Bygdin turisthytte. In the summer these huts are connected by boat and in winter by ski or snowmobile.

The first weekend in August every year, the Vinjerock festival is arranged at Eidsbugarden. Artists such as Dumdum Boys, Thomas Dybdahl and Ken Hensley have played at the festival.
