= Tjørnholstinden =

Mountain in Innlandet, Norway

- Tjørnholstind (unofficial)
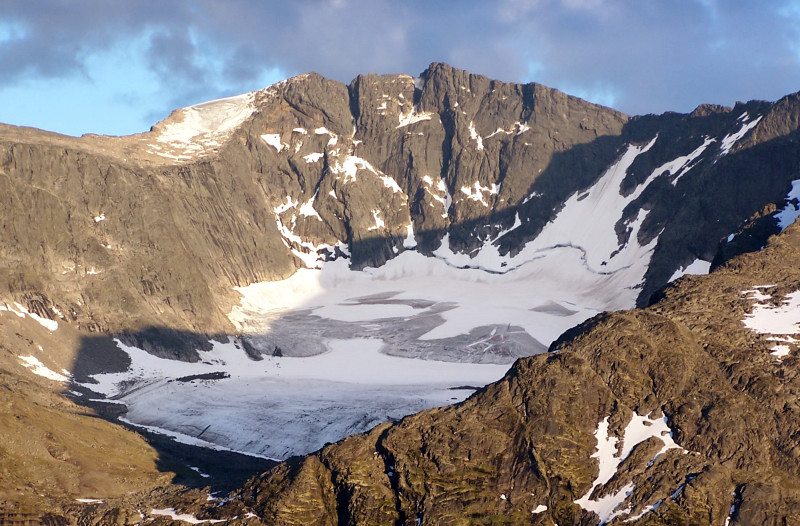
- Tjørnholstind (right highest peak) seen from the north.

Highest point
- Elevation: 2,331 m (7,648 ft)
- Prominence: 352 m (1,155 ft)
- Parent peak: Knutsholstinden
- Isolation: 5 km (3.1 mi) to Knutsholstinden
- Listing: 17th in Norway
- Coordinates: 61°26′41″N 8°38′47″E

Geography
- Interactive map of the mountain
- Location: Innlandet, Norway
- Parent range: Jotunheimen
- Topo map: 1617 IV Gjende

Climbing
- First ascent: 28 July 1843: Harald Nicolai Storm Wergeland

Tjønnholstinden is a mountain in Vågå Municipality in Innlandet county, Norway. The 2,331-metre (7,648 ft) tall mountain is located in the Jotunheimen mountains within Jotunheimen National Park. The mountain sits about 50 kilometres (31 mi) southwest of the village of Vågåmo and about 25 kilometres (16 mi) northwest of the village of Beitostølen. The mountain is surrounded by several other notable mountains including Bukkehåmåren, Høgdebrotet, and Eggen to the northeast; Rasletinden to the southeast; Tjønnholsoksle to the south; Skarvflytindene and Leirungstinden to the southwest; and Surtningssue to the north.

The mountain lies south of the lake Gjende and north of the Leirungsdalen valley. On the northern side of the mountain, there is a 400 metres (1,300 ft) vertical drop down to the Nordre Tjønnholet glacier. The mountain has two peaks with a narrow ridge between. The western summit is the highest at 2,331 metres (7,648 ft) and the lower eastern summit has elevation 2,318 m (7,605 ft). The lower eastern summit is named Steinflytind. The mountain and both peaks are easily accessible from both west and east.

== Name ==
The first element is the genitive of the name of the gorge Tjønnholet. The last element is the finite form of tind which means 'mountain peak'. The name of the gorge is a compound of tjønn which means 'tarn' or 'small lake' and the finite form of hol which means 'hole', 'hollow', or 'gorge'. There are actually two gorges with the name Tjønnholet here: Nørdre Tjønnholet north of the peak - and Søre Tjønnholet south of the peak.

== See also ==
- List of mountains of Norway by height
