= Høgdebrotet =

Mountain in Innlandet, Norway

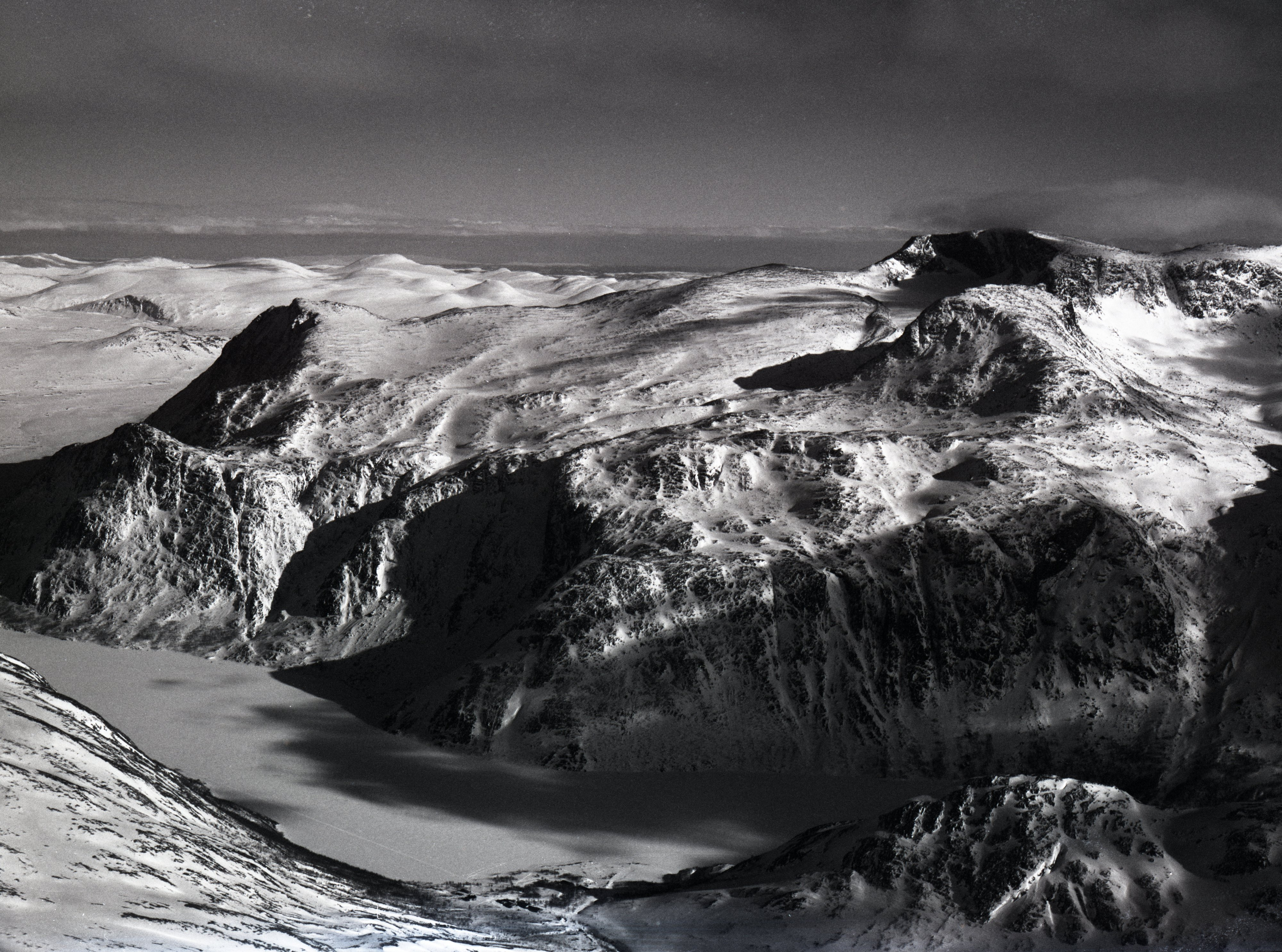
- Aerial photograph taken over Memurudalen towards Gjende and Høgdebrotet in the upper right hand corner

Highest point
- Elevation: 2,227 m (7,306 ft)
- Prominence: 87 m (285 ft)
- Parent peak: Tjønnholstinden
- Isolation: 1.4 km (0.87 mi)
- Coordinates: 61°27′10″N 8°40′10″E

Geography
- Interactive map of the mountain
- Location: Innlandet, Norway
- Parent range: Jotunheimen
- Topo map: 1617 IV Gjende

Høgdebrotet is a mountain in Vågå Municipality in Innlandet county, Norway. The 2,227-metre (7,306 ft) tall mountain is located in the Jotunheimen mountains within Jotunheimen National Park. The mountain sits about 55 kilometres (34 mi) southwest of the village of Vågåmo and about 25 kilometres (16 mi) northwest of the village of Beitostølen. The mountain is surrounded by several other notable mountains including Bukkehåmåren to the northeast, Rasletinden to the south, Tjønnholstinden and Tjønnholsoksle to the southwest, Eggen and Surtningssue to the northwest, and Besshøe and Besseggen to the north.

== See also ==
- List of mountains of Norway by height
