= Ringstindane =

Mountain ridge in Vestland, Norway

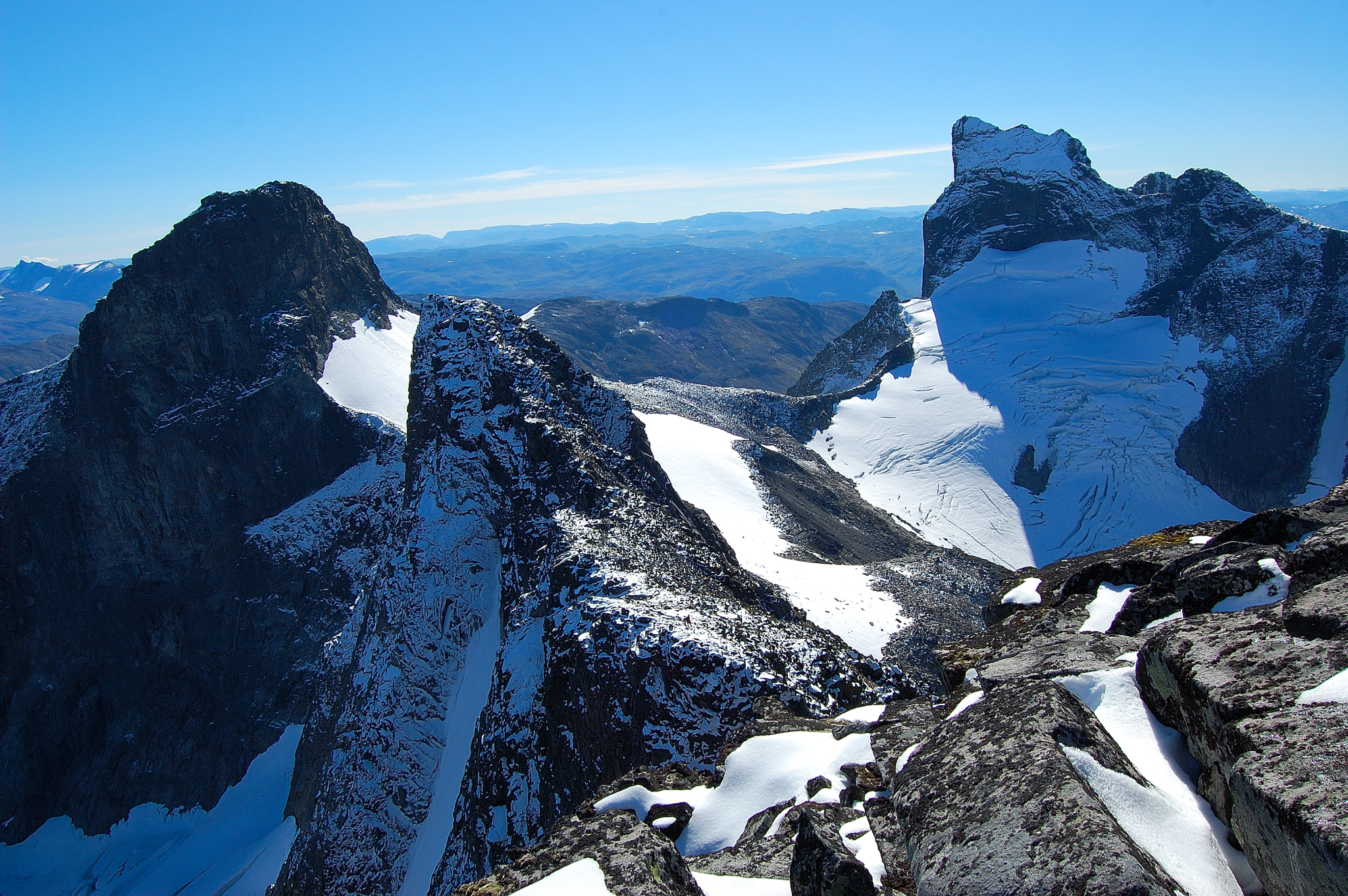
- Store Ringstind

Highest point
- Elevation: 2,124 m (6,969 ft)
- Prominence: 180 m (590 ft)
- Coordinates: 61°26′31″N 7°48′2″E

Geography
- Location within Vestland Location within Norway
- Location: Vestland, Norway

Ringstindane is a mountain ridge consisting of three peaks south-west in Jotunheimen National Park in Vestland, Norway. The highest peak reaches 2,124 m (6,969 ft) above sea level.
