= Slettmarkkampen =

Mountain in Innlandet, Norway

- Interactive map of the mountain

Highest point
- Elevation: 2,032 m (6,667 ft)
- Prominence: 36 m (118 ft)
- Parent peak: Slettmarkhøe
- Isolation: 0.39 km (0.24 mi)
- Coordinates: 61°23′57″N 8°26′42″E

Geography
- Location: Innlandet, Norway
- Parent range: Jotunheimen
- Topo map: 1517 I Tyin

Slettmarkkampen is a mountain in Vang Municipality in Innlandet county, Norway. The 2,032-metre (6,667 ft) tall mountain is located in the Jotunheimen mountains, just outside the boundary of Jotunheimen National Park. The mountain sits about 30 kilometres (19 mi) north of the village of Vang i Valdres. The mountain is surrounded by several other notable mountains including Slettmarkpiggen to the east, Galdeberget to the southwest, Snøholstinden to the northwest, and Store Svartdalspiggen to the northeast.

== See also ==
- List of mountains of Norway by height
