= Store Kvitingskjølen =

Mountain in Innlandet, Norway

- Interactive map of the mountain

Highest point
- Elevation: 2,064 m (6,772 ft)
- Prominence: 778 m (2,552 ft)
- Isolation: 9 km (5.6 mi)
- Coordinates: 61°45′46″N 8°44′09″E

Geography
- Location: Innlandet, Norway
- Parent range: Jotunheimen

Store Kvitingskjølen is the highest peak on the mountain Kvitingskjølen (located on the northern edge of Jotunheimen) in Lom Municipality in Innlandet county, Norway. It has a height of 2,064 meters. Vestre Kvitingskjølen is another peak with a height of 2,060 meters above sea level. Two peaks separated by a shallow saddle.

Norway's oldest shoe, a leather shoe from the Bronze Age, was found on Kvitingskjølen in 2006.

This peak has a large, fine round wattle. It is a relatively isolated massif divided from neighboring mountains by valleys – Ottadalen in the north and Smådalen in the south. A number of shallow scree covered ridges lead to its two peaks. These ridges are separated by streams that have carved deep ravines on the lower slopes. Due to the fact that Kvitingskjølen is rounded, it is less popular among tourists. The valley that divides it from the rest of Jotunheimen, Smådalen, is rich in wildlife, including wolverine. The valleys that surround Kvitingskjølen are also rich with old seters, a summer farms in the high pastures. Many of these seters are still in use.

Several hiking routes lead to the Store Kvitingskjølen. Some of them take place in safe terrain and are available for hocking almost all year round, however, in winter, the weather can be windy and cloudy in the area. It is a popular place among skiers. One of the easiest routes starts from Soleggen fjellstue, 957 meters above sea level. From here, a summer road (not cleaned in winter) follows towards the hamlet of Sålell, 1200 m above sea level. The road first goes through the sliver of mountain birch forest before turning right towards Sålell after passing the forest border.

This peak has a large, fine round wattle and a view with no other large peaks in the immediate vicinity. There is also a view of Rondene to the north and Jotunheimen to the south and west.

== See also ==
- List of mountains in Norway by height
