= Kvitskardtinden =

Mountain in Innlandet, Norway

- Interactive map of the mountain

Highest point
- Elevation: 2,193 m (7,195 ft)
- Prominence: 300 m (980 ft)
- Parent peak: Mesmogtinden
- Isolation: 1.3 km (0.81 mi) to Mesmogtinden
- Coordinates: 61°23′47″N 8°33′14″E

Geography
- Location: Innlandet, Norway
- Parent range: Jotunheimen
- Topo map: 1617 IV Gjende

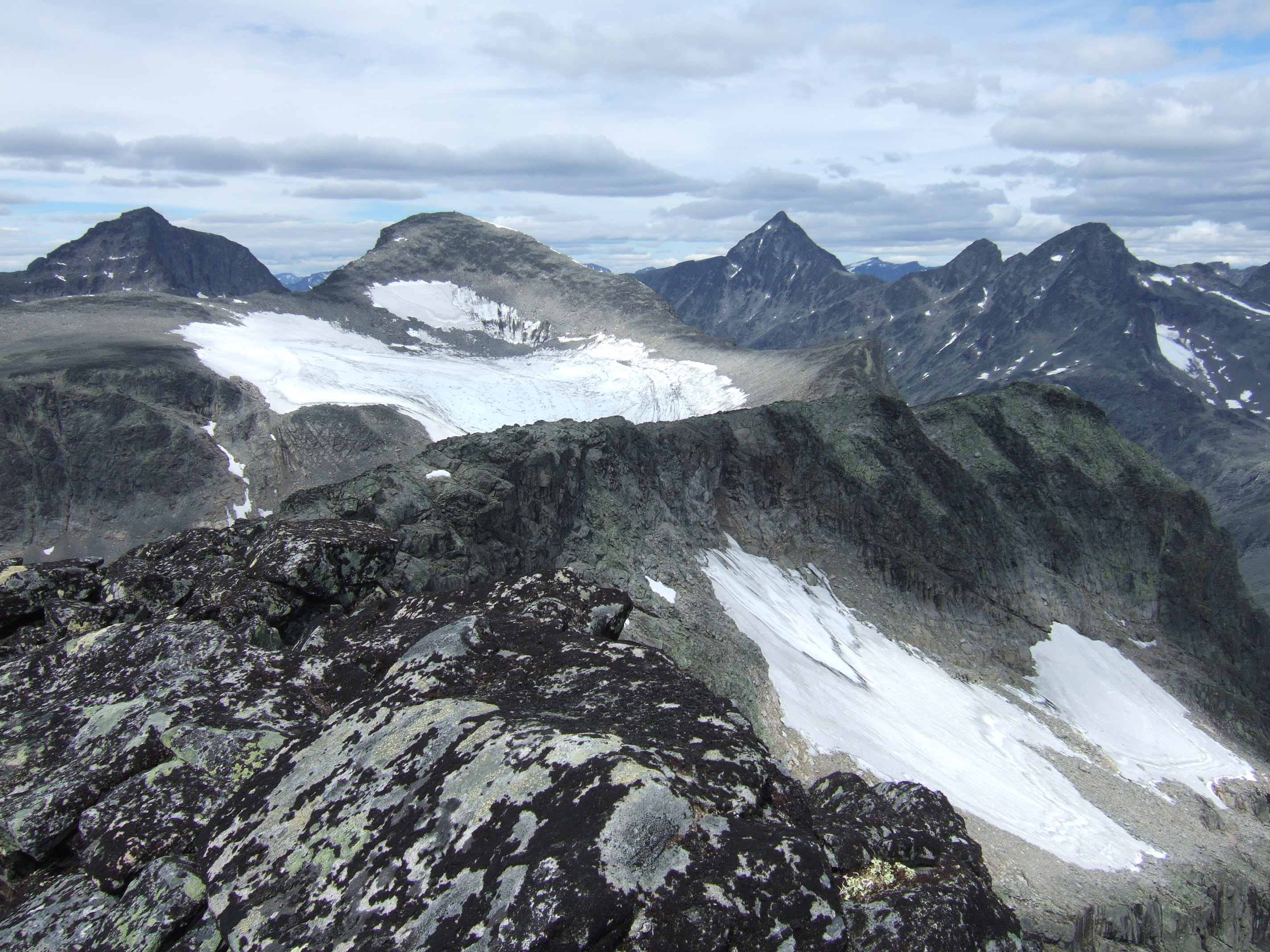
Mesmogtinden, Kvitskardtinden and Store Knutsholtinden

Kvitskardtinden is a mountain on the border of Vågå Municipality and Vang Municipality in Innlandet county, Norway. The 2,193-metre (7,195 ft) tall mountain is located in the Jotunheimen mountains within Jotunheimen National Park. The mountain sits about 60 kilometres (37 mi) southwest of the village of Vågåmo and about 15 kilometres (9.3 mi) northwest of the village of Beitostølen. The mountain is surrounded by several other notable mountains including Store Svartdalspiggen, Langedalstinden, and Mesmogtinden to the northwest; Knutsholstinden and Austre Leirungstinden to the north; Leirungskampen and Kalvehøgde to the east, and Torfinnstindene to the southeast.

== See also ==
- List of mountains of Norway by height
