= Austre Leirungstinden =

Mountain in Innlandet, Norway

- Leirungstinden
- Interactive map of the mountain

Highest point
- Elevation: 2,288 m (7,507 ft)
- Prominence: 288 m (945 ft)
- Parent peak: Tjønnholstinden
- Isolation: 2 km (1.2 mi)
- Listing: #23 in Norway
- Coordinates: 61°24′58″N 8°34′55″E

Geography
- Location: Innlandet, Norway
- Parent range: Jotunheimen
- Topo map: 1617 IV Gjende

Austre Leirungstinden is a mountain in Vågå Municipality in Innlandet county, Norway. The 2,288-metre (7,507 ft) tall mountain is located in the Jotunheimen mountains within Jotunheimen National Park. The mountain sits about 60 kilometres (37 mi) southwest of the village of Vågåmo and about 15 kilometres (9.3 mi) northwest of the village of Beitostølen. The mountain is surrounded by several other notable mountains including Nordre Knutsholstinden, Store Knutsholstinden, and Vesle Knutsholstinden to the northwest; Skarvflytindene to the northeast; Leirungskampen and Kalvehøgde to the southeast; and Kvitskardtinden and Langedalstinden to the east.

The mountain has two main peaks. The eastern of the two peaks is the highest, reaching 2,288 metres (7,507 ft) above sea level. The western peak reaches 2,250 metres (7,380 ft) above sea level.

== See also ==
- List of mountains of Norway by height
