= Leirungskampen =

Mountain in Innlandet, Norway

- Interactive map of the mountain

Highest point
- Elevation: 2,079 m (6,821 ft)
- Prominence: 84 m (276 ft)
- Parent peak: Kalvehøgde
- Isolation: 0.358 km (0.222 mi)
- Coordinates: 61°23′45″N 8°36′05″E

Geography
- Location: Innlandet, Norway
- Parent range: Jotunheimen
- Topo map: 1617 IV Gjende

Leirungskampen is a mountain in Vågå Municipality in Innlandet county, Norway. The 2,079-metre (6,821 ft) tall mountain is located in the Jotunheimen mountains within Jotunheimen National Park. The mountain sits about 60 kilometres (37 mi) southwest of the village of Vågåmo and about 20 kilometres (12 mi) northwest of the village of Beitostølen. The mountain is surrounded by several other notable mountains including Austre Leirungstinden to the north Kalvehøgde and Rasletinden to the east, Torfinnstindene to the southwest, and Kvitskardtinden and Mesmogtinden to the west.

== See also ==
- List of mountains of Norway by height
