= Eggen (Norway) =

Mountain in Innlandet, Norway

- Eggi (unofficial)
- Interactive map of the mountain

Highest point
- Elevation: 2,041 m (6,696 ft)
- Prominence: 80 m (260 ft)
- Parent peak: Høgdebrotet
- Isolation: 1.3 km (0.81 mi)
- Coordinates: 61°27′47″N 8°39′11″E

Geography
- Location: Innlandet, Norway
- Parent range: Jotunheimen
- Topo map: 1617 IV Gjende

Eggen is a mountain in Vågå Municipality in Innlandet county, Norway. The 2,041-metre (6,696 ft) tall mountain is located in the Jotunheimen mountains within Jotunheimen National Park. The mountain sits about 55 kilometres (34 mi) southwest of the village of Vågåmo and about 25 kilometres (16 mi) northwest of the village of Beitostølen. The mountain is surrounded by several other notable mountains including Bukkehåmåren to the east, Høgdebrotet to the southeast, Tjønnholstinden to the south, Skarvflytindene to the southwest, Surtningssue to the northwest, and Besshø and Besseggen to the northeast.

== See also ==
- List of mountains of Norway by height
