= Høgbrøthøgde =

Mountain in Innlandet, Norway

- Høgbrothøgdi (unofficial)
- Interactive map of the mountain

Highest point
- Elevation: 1,821 m (5,974 ft)
- Prominence: 227 m (745 ft)
- Parent peak: Snøholstinden
- Isolation: 1.9 km (1.2 mi) to Storegut
- Coordinates: 61°25′01″N 8°16′53″E

Geography
- Location: Innlandet, Norway
- Parent range: Jotunheimen
- Topo map: 1517 I Tyin

Høgbrøthøgde is a mountain in Vang Municipality in Innlandet county, Norway. The 1,821-metre (5,974 ft) tall mountain is located in the Jotunheimen mountains and inside the Jotunheimen National Park. The mountain sits about 38 kilometres (24 mi) northwest of the village of Vang i Valdres. The mountain is surrounded by several other notable mountains including Snøholstinden to the northeast, Mjølkedalstinden to the north, Storegut and Langeskavltinden to the northwest, and Langeskavlen to the southwest.

== See also ==
- List of mountains of Norway by height
