= Aasmund Olavsson Vinje =

Norwegian poet and journalist (1818–1870)

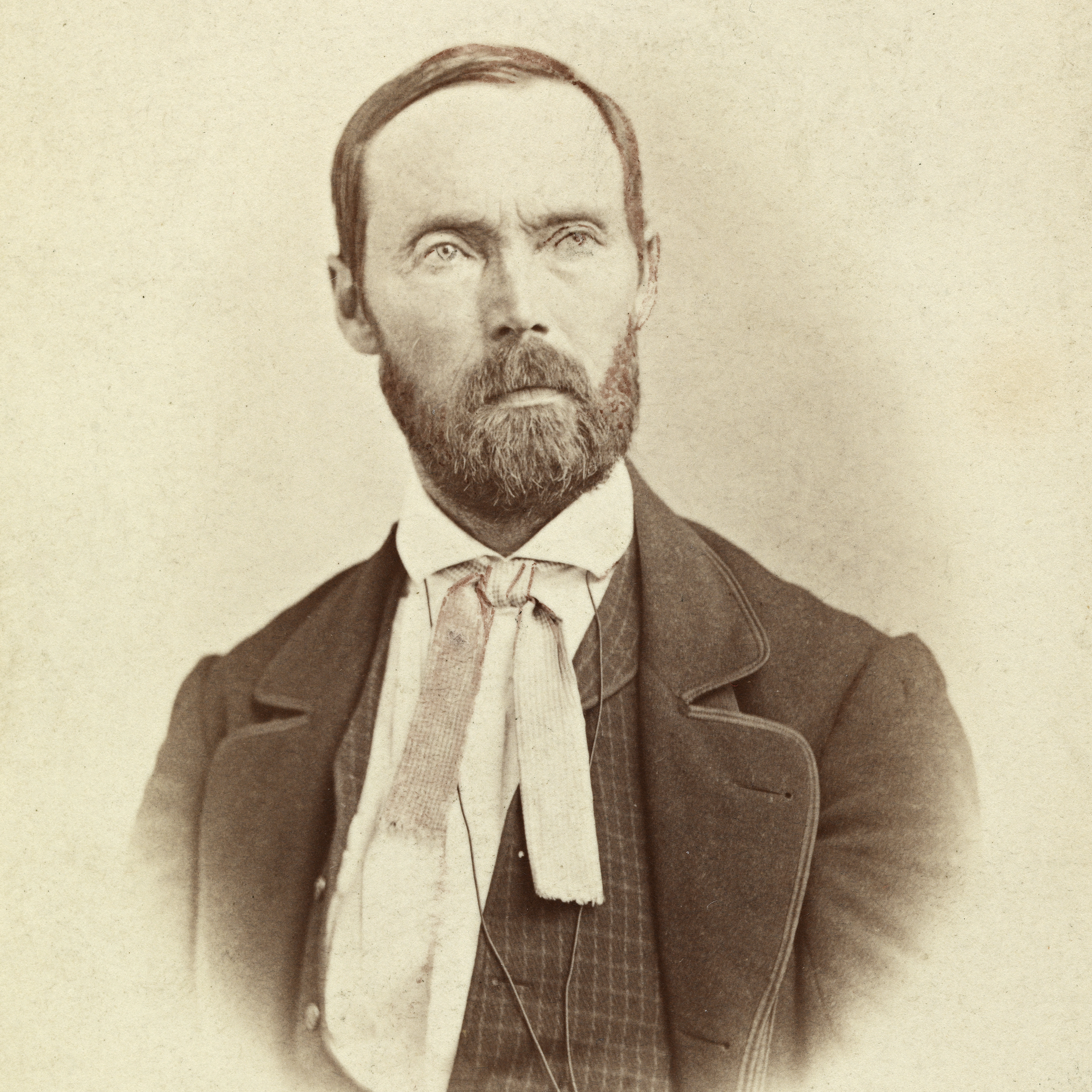
- Born: Aasmund Olavsson Vinje; 6 April 1818; Vinje, Bratsberg amt, Norway
- Died: 30 July 1870 (aged 52); Gran Municipality, Kristians amt, Norway
- Occupations: Journalist, poet, essayist

Aasmund Olavsson Vinje (6 April 1818 – 30 July 1870) was a Norwegian poet and journalist who is remembered for poetry, travel writing, and his pioneering use of Landsmål (now known as Nynorsk).

== Background ==
Vinje was born into a poor but well-read family in the parish of Vinje in Bratsberg amt (county). He had a voracious appetite for learning and supported himself in part by teaching. He earned his university entrance exam after attending the same school as Henrik Ibsen, studied law, and became an attorney.

== Career ==
In 1858, Vinje founded the periodical Dølen (The dales-man), in which he published travel accounts and editorial comments on art, language and politics that serve as records for the period in which he lived. Dølen ceased publication in 1870.

Vinje did much to articulate the difference between urban and rural life in Norway and was among the sophisticated exponents of Norwegian romantic nationalism. But he was also known for his critical scepticism and "dual vision" (Norwegian: tvisyn)—looking at both sides of the coin. He was politically active to the extent that the government fired him as an attorney for criticizing its foreign policy.

Among his writings, the Ferdaminni fraa Sumaren 1860 (Travel memories from the summer of 1860, translated into English as Travel memories from Norway 1860) is highly esteemed in Norwegian literature, describing a journey on foot from Oslo to Trondheim in order to cover the coronation of King Charles in the Nidarosdomen cathedral for Dølen. The work deals more warm-heartedly with the ordinary people he met on his journey than with the royalty he encountered at the coronation.

In 1863, he wrote A Norseman's View of Britain and the British, which was translated into Norwegian ten years later.

Some of Vinje's poetry is still very much alive in Norway, especially Ved Rundarne (English: At Rondane) and Våren (English: The Last Spring), which Edvard Grieg set to music.

Grieg set many of Vinje's poems, and in 1881 published Tolv Melodier til Digte af A. O. Vinje (English: Twelve melodies to Poems of A. O. Vinje, for voice and piano), Opus 33, which includes The Last Spring and At Rondane.

Dying of stomach cancer, Vinje decided to spend his last days in the countryside. He died as a guest of his friend, minister (later bishop) Anton Christian Bang at Gran Municipality in Hadeland on 30 July 1870 and is buried nearby in the churchyard of the Sister churches at Granavollen (Søsterkirkene). In 1873, a large monument with a bust of Vinje by Brynjulf Bergslien was erected at the site.

Today, there are Vinje paths in several Norwegian cities and towns, including Oslo, Stavanger, Trondheim, Moss, Fjellhamar, Corby, Hamar, Gjøvik, Rjukan, Skien and Mandal.

== Slogan ==
A 2014 Dagsavisen article said that Vinje coined the most Norwegian of slogans, "Det er saa viktig aa kosa seg!": "It is so important to enjoy oneself!"

== Selected works ==
- En Ballade om Kongen og Kongehuset (1853)
- Ferdaminni fraa Sumaren 1860 (1861)
- A Norseman's View of Britain and the British (1863)
- Diktsamling (1864)
- Storegut (1866)
- Blandkorn (1867)
- Dølen i eiget Hus atter (1868)
- Um vaart nationale Stræv (1869)

== Memorials ==
- In 1918, a statue of Vinje was erected in Skien
- In 1947, a bronze statue in full figure by Knut Skinnarland (1909–1993) was placed at the Vinjar community hall in Vinje, near Vinjestoga
- In 1959, a memorial was raised to Vinje at Eidsbugarden where he had a private hut
- In 1968 for the 150th anniversary of Vinje's birth the Posten Norge released a stamp with a portrait of Vinje
- In 1968, a statue of Vinje by Dyre Vaa was erected in Sogn Student Village in Oslo
- In 1984, Vinje was depicted on Norges Bank's 50-krone note

== See also ==
- Vinjerock

== Other sources ==
- Glienke, Bernhard (1999). "Vinje in London". In Lang, Peter (ed.). Metropolis und nordische Moderne (in Norwegian). Frankfurt.
- Vesaas, Olav (2001). A.O. Vinje. Ein tankens hærmann (in Norwegian). Oslo: Cappelen.
- Langslet, Lars Roar; Rydne, Jon H. (1993). Villmann, vismann og veiviser : en essaysamling om A. O. Vinje (in Norwegian). Oslo: Cappelen. ISBN 8202140706.
- Glomnes, Eli; Gulliksen, Øyvind T.; Solberg, Olav (1992). At føle paa nationens puls : åtte artiklar om Aasmund O. Vinje (in Norwegian). Oslo: Novus. ISBN 8270991961.
