= Torfinnstindane =

Mountain in Innlandet, Norway

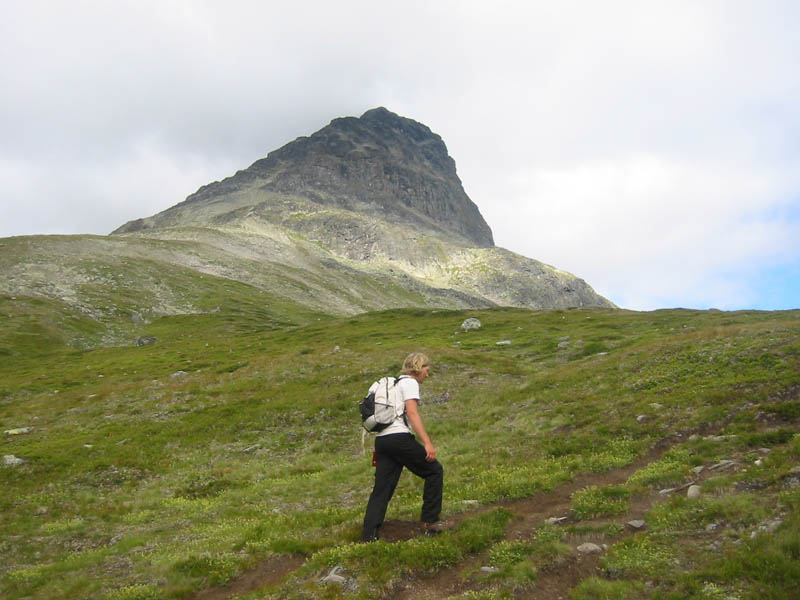
- Eastern summit of Torfinnstindene, August 2006

Highest point
- Elevation: 2,118 m (6,949 ft)
- Prominence: 199 m (653 ft)
- Parent peak: Kvitskardtinden
- Isolation: 2.6 km (1.6 mi) to Kvitskardtinden
- Coordinates: 61°22′26″N 8°34′26″E

Geography
- Interactive map of the mountain
- Location: Innlandet, Norway
- Parent range: Jotunheimen
- Topo map: 1617 IV Gjende

Climbing
- First ascent: 1876 (Emanuel Mohn, William Cecil Slingsby, Knut Lykken)
- Easiest route: Strenuous hike

Torfinnstindane is a mountain in Vang Municipality in Innlandet county, Norway. The 2,118-metre (6,949 ft) tall mountain is located in the Jotunheimen mountains, about 25 kilometres (16 mi) north of the village of Vang i Valdres. The mountain is surrounded by several other notable mountains including Rasletinden and Kalvehøgde to the northeast, Nørdre Kalvehølotinden to the east, Galdeberget and Uksedalshøe to the west, and Langedalstinden to the northwest.

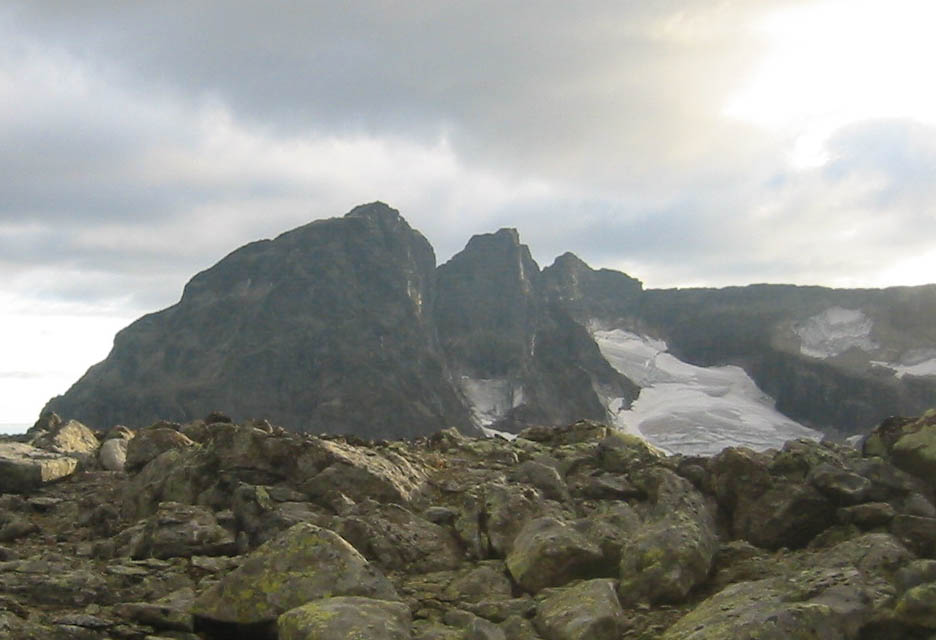
The three Torfinnstindene summits seen from Kalvehøgde.

It is situated on the northern shore of lake Bygdin on the western side of the Svartdalen Valley and is the southernmost and most prominent summit on a rather long ridge containing twelve more 2000 m peaks. Torfinnstindene has three main summits: Øystre Torfinnstind, Midtre Torfinnstind, and Vestre Torfinnstind (Eastern, Middle and Western). The name probably derives from the Norwegian male name Torfinn, but some sources claim that the name derives from the local name of a type of grass and has during the last 100 years been transformed into Torfinn, which is close to the name of the grass, Turfing. The name is also found in the valley due west of the summits, the small glacier covering parts of the extremely steep north wall, the sharp ridge pointing northwards from the Western summit and the tourist lodge situated on lake Bygdin south of the mountain.

The summits are the southernmost 2,000-metre (6,600 ft) peaks in Norway, except for one other peak further south. The mountain is made of the extremely hard gabbro rock. The gabbro in Torfinnstindene is partly of the normal "gray-with-black-specs" variety, but parts of the eastern summit are of a red variety. The view from the summits, particularly the Eastern, is one of the best in southern Norway. On a clear day, you can see almost as far as the capital city of Oslo.

== Climbing ==
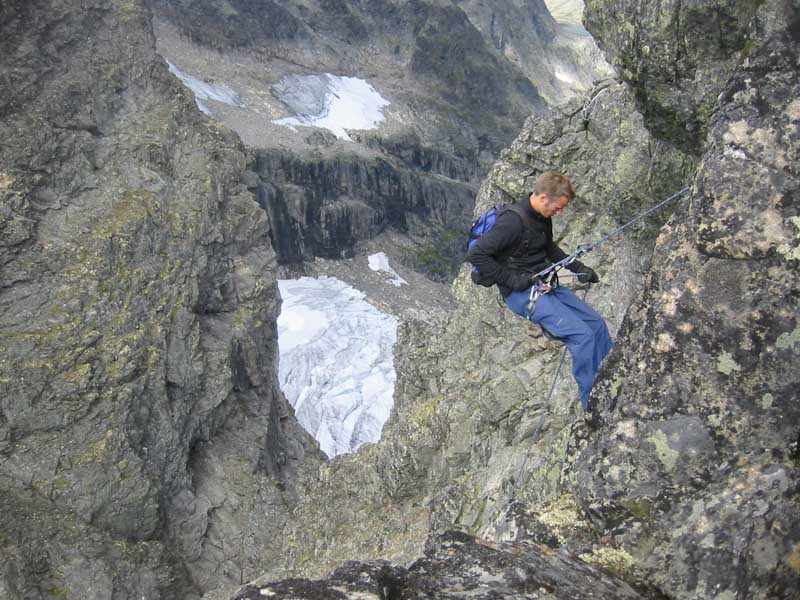
The vertical western wall of Eastern Torfinnstind towards the steep wall of Middle Torfinnstind.

The Eastern summit was reached for the first time in 1876 by Emanuel Mohn, William Cecil Slingsby and Knut Lykken. The two first being mountaineers from Christiania and Great Britain, and the third the local expert. In 1894 the middle summit was climbed by, Andreas Saxegaard, Therese Bertheau, Antonette Kamstrup and Tostein Røine, the last one being the local expert. The western summit, which is the easiest to climb, was visited for the first time in 1912 by Rolv Ødegaard.

The Eastern and Western summits can be reached after a rather strenuous hike, but the Middle summit can only be climbed - normally as part of a traverse of all the summits. The following is a brief description of the trip. The first part of the hike follows the grass- and flower-covered slope on the southeast flank of the Eastern summit. A number of ravines, dug out by meltwater from the Ice Age on, leads towards the summit. Only one of them leads all the way to the eastern shoulder of the summit. This is a steep climb, but with good weather conditions no equipment is needed.

From the eastern summit, a long rappel is needed to reach the very steep and narrow pass between the two summits. The climb to the middle summit needs no equipment. From the middle summit three rappels are needed to get all the way down to the even more steep and narrow pass between the two last summits. The climb up the lowest, western summit, is quite easy, but many would prefer to use a rope on a short part of the climb. From the western summit, a sharp edge leads down to the long ridge turning northwards towards lake Gjende. The rest of the descent is long talus slopes.

The climb of the eastern summit has gained popularity in the last years of increased peak bagging in Norway, and guided tours are arranged. The traverse is also popular, but the number who completes it is much lower than the number of visitors on the eastern summit. The western, easiest and lowest summit is visited rather rarely except by those traversing.

== See also ==
- List of mountains of Norway by height
