= Bukkehåmåren =

Mountain in Innlandet, Norway

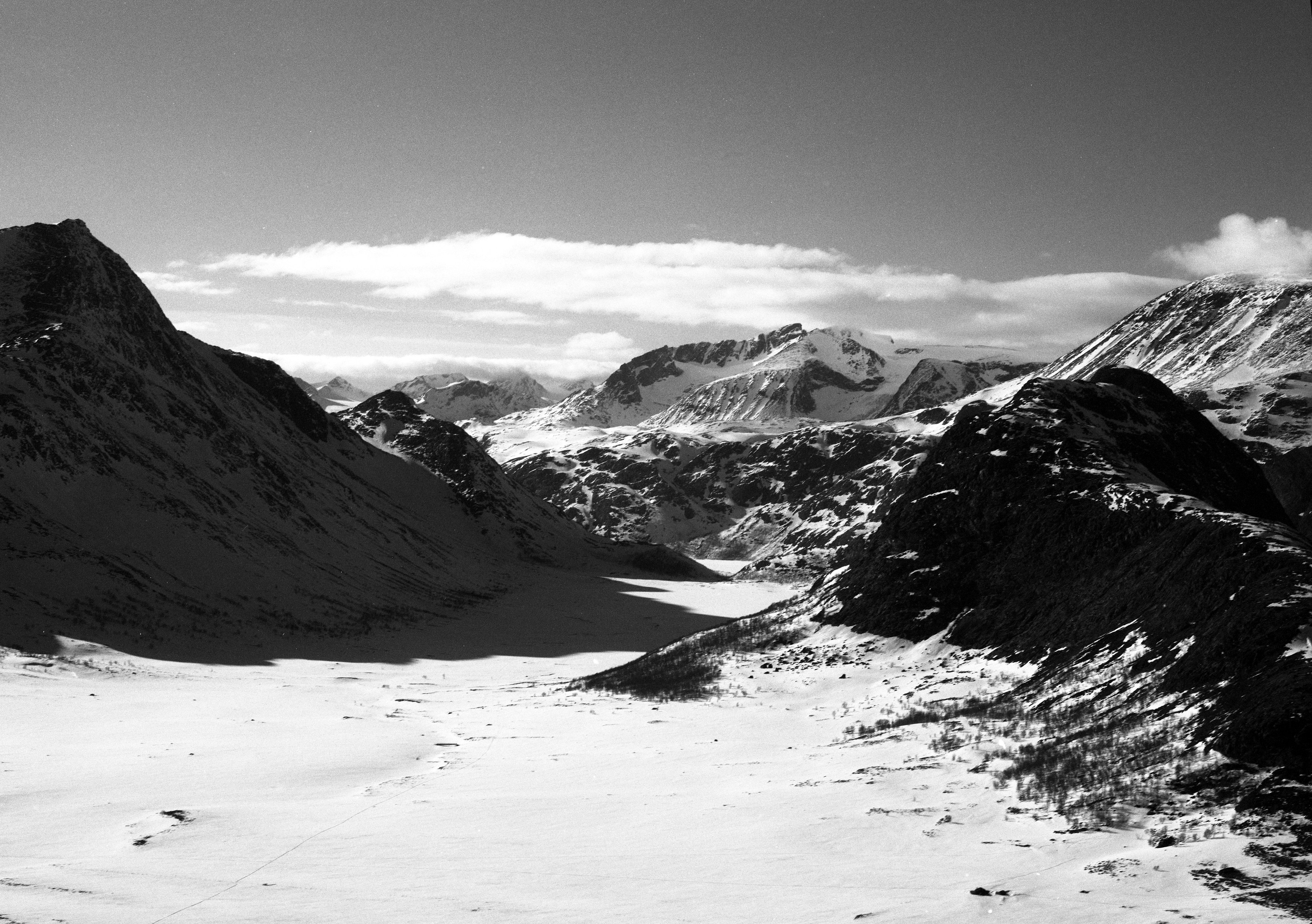
- Picture take over the Leirungsdalen with Bukkehåmåren to the left

Highest point
- Elevation: 1,910 m (6,270 ft)
- Prominence: 73 m (240 ft)
- Parent peak: Kvassryggen
- Isolation: 1.1 km (0.68 mi)
- Coordinates: 61°28′11″N 8°42′30″E

Geography
- Interactive map of the mountain
- Location: Innlandet, Norway
- Parent range: Jotunheimen
- Topo map: 1617 IV Gjende

Bukkehåmåren is a mountain in Vågå Municipality in Innlandet county, Norway. The 1,910-metre (6,270 ft) tall mountain is located in the Jotunheimen mountains within Jotunheimen National Park. The mountain sits about 55 kilometres (34 mi) southwest of the village of Vågåmo and about 25 kilometres (16 mi) northwest of the village of Beitostølen. The mountain is surrounded by several other notable mountains including Heimdalshøe to the east, Høgdebrotet and Tjønnholstinden to the southwest, Eggen to the west, Surtningssue to the northwest, and Besshøe and Besseggen to the north, Veslfjellet to the northeast. The small lake Bukkehåmårtjønne lies just south of the mountain peak.

== See also ==
- List of mountains of Norway by height
