= Mjølkedalstinden =

Mountain in Vestland, Norway

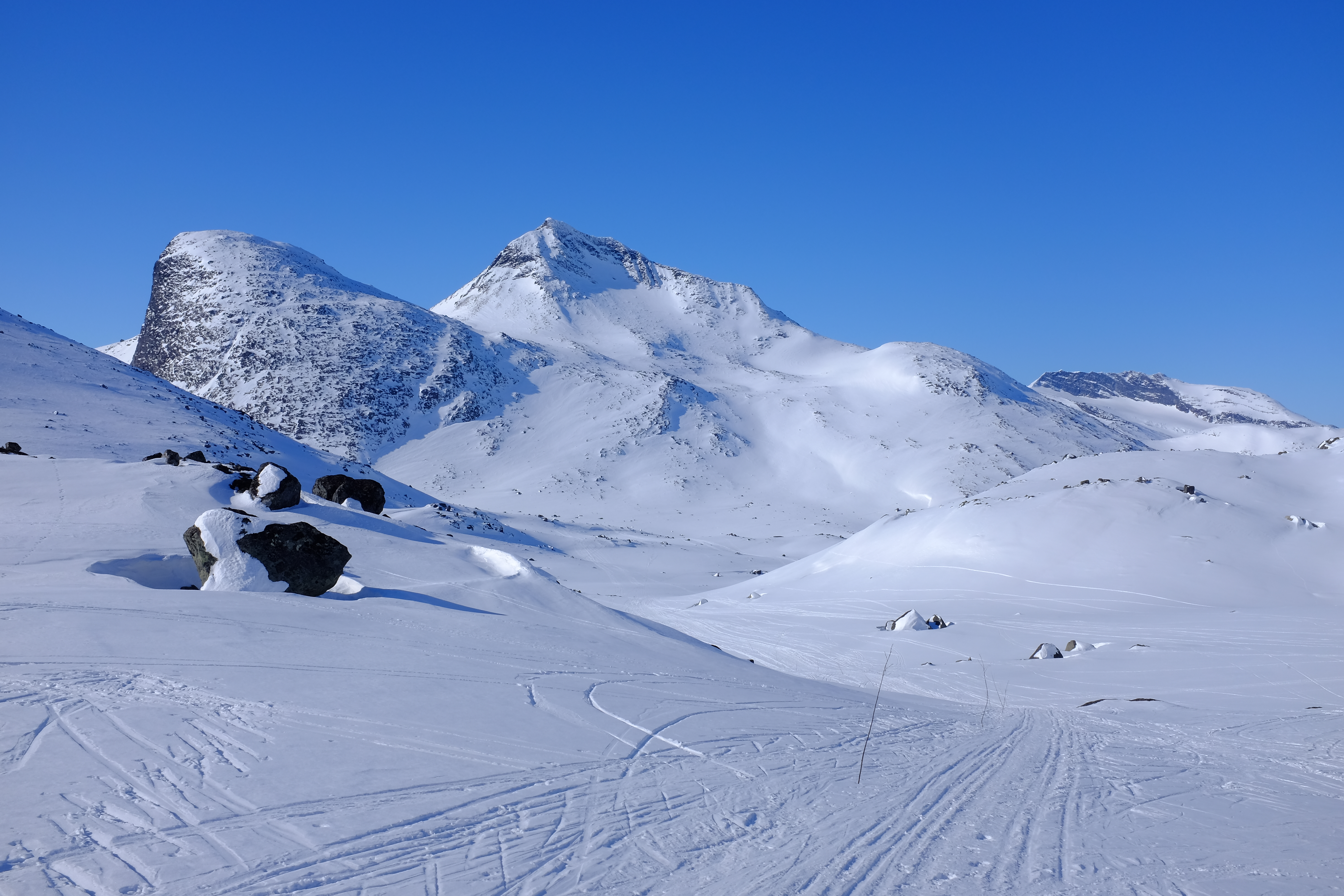
- Mjølkedalstinden seen from Rauddalsbandet. Olavsbunuten to the left.

Highest point
- Elevation: 2,138 m (7,014 ft)
- Prominence: 543 m (1,781 ft)
- Parent peak: Snøholstinden
- Isolation: 3.3 km (2.1 mi) to Store Rauddalseggje
- Coordinates: 61°27′34″N 8°15′01″E

Geography
- Location: Vestland, Norway
- Parent range: Jotunheimen
- Topo map: 1517 I Tyin

Mjølkedalstinden is a mountain in Luster Municipality in Vestland county, Norway. The 2,138-metre (7,014 ft) tall mountain lies south of the Rauddalen valley, about 30 kilometres (19 mi) east of the village of Fortun. It is easily climbed from the ridge from the north-west.

== See also ==
- List of mountains of Norway by height
