= Langedalstinden =

Mountain in Innlandet, Norway

- Interactive map of the mountain

Highest point
- Elevation: 2,206 m (7,238 ft)
- Prominence: 110 m (360 ft)
- Parent peak: Mesmogtinden
- Isolation: 0.5 km (0.31 mi) to Mesmogtinden
- Coordinates: 61°24′03″N 8°31′24″E

Geography
- Location: Innlandet, Norway
- Parent range: Jotunheimen
- Topo map: 1617 IV Gjende

Langedalstinden is a mountain on the border of Vågå Municipality and Vang Municipality in Innlandet county, Norway. The 2,206-metre (7,238 ft) tall mountain is located in the Jotunheimen mountains within Jotunheimen National Park. The mountain sits about 60 kilometres (37 mi) southwest of the village of Vågåmo and about 20 kilometres (12 mi) northwest of the village of Beitostølen. The mountain is surrounded by several other notable mountains including Store Svartdalspiggen to the northwest, Galdeberget and Oksedalshøi to the southwest, Kvitskardtinden to the southeast, and Mesmogtinden and Knutsholstinden to the northeast.

== See also ==
- List of mountains of Norway by height
