= Snøholstinden =

Mountain in Innlandet, Norway

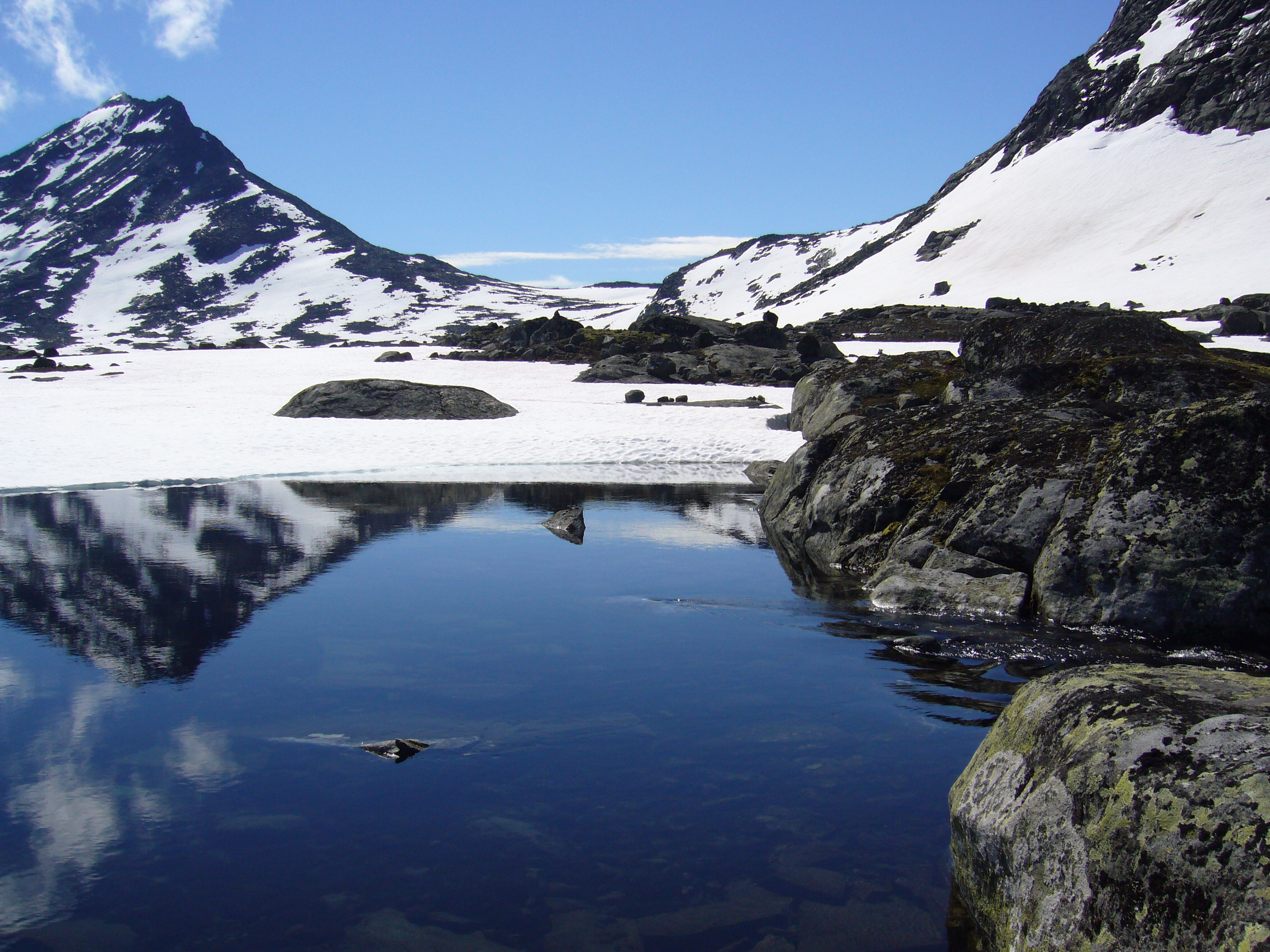
- View from the hut Olavsbu towards Snoholstinden

Highest point
- Elevation: 2,142 m (7,028 ft)
- Prominence: 682 m (2,238 ft)
- Isolation: 2.8 km (1.7 mi) to Store Rauddalseggje
- Coordinates: 61°26′30″N 8°18′37″E

Geography
- Interactive map of the mountain
- Location: Innlandet, Norway
- Parent range: Jotunheimen
- Topo map: 1517 I Tyin

Snøholstinden is a mountain in Vang Municipality in Innlandet county, Norway. The 2,142-metre (7,028 ft) tall mountain peak lies just inside Vang Municipality, but the lower elevations of the mountain itself extend into the neighboring Lom Municipality in Innlandet county and Luster Municipality in Vestland county. The mountain is located in the Jotunheimen mountains and inside the Jotunheimen National Park. The mountain sits about 40 kilometres (25 mi) northwest of the village of Vang i Valdres. The mountain is surrounded by several other notable mountains including Storegut to the southwest, Store Rauddalseggje to the northeast, Slettmarkpiggen and Galdeberget to the southeast, and Høgbrothøgdi and Langeskavlen to the southwest.

== See also ==
- List of mountains of Norway by height
