= Bygdin =

Lake in Innlandet, Norway

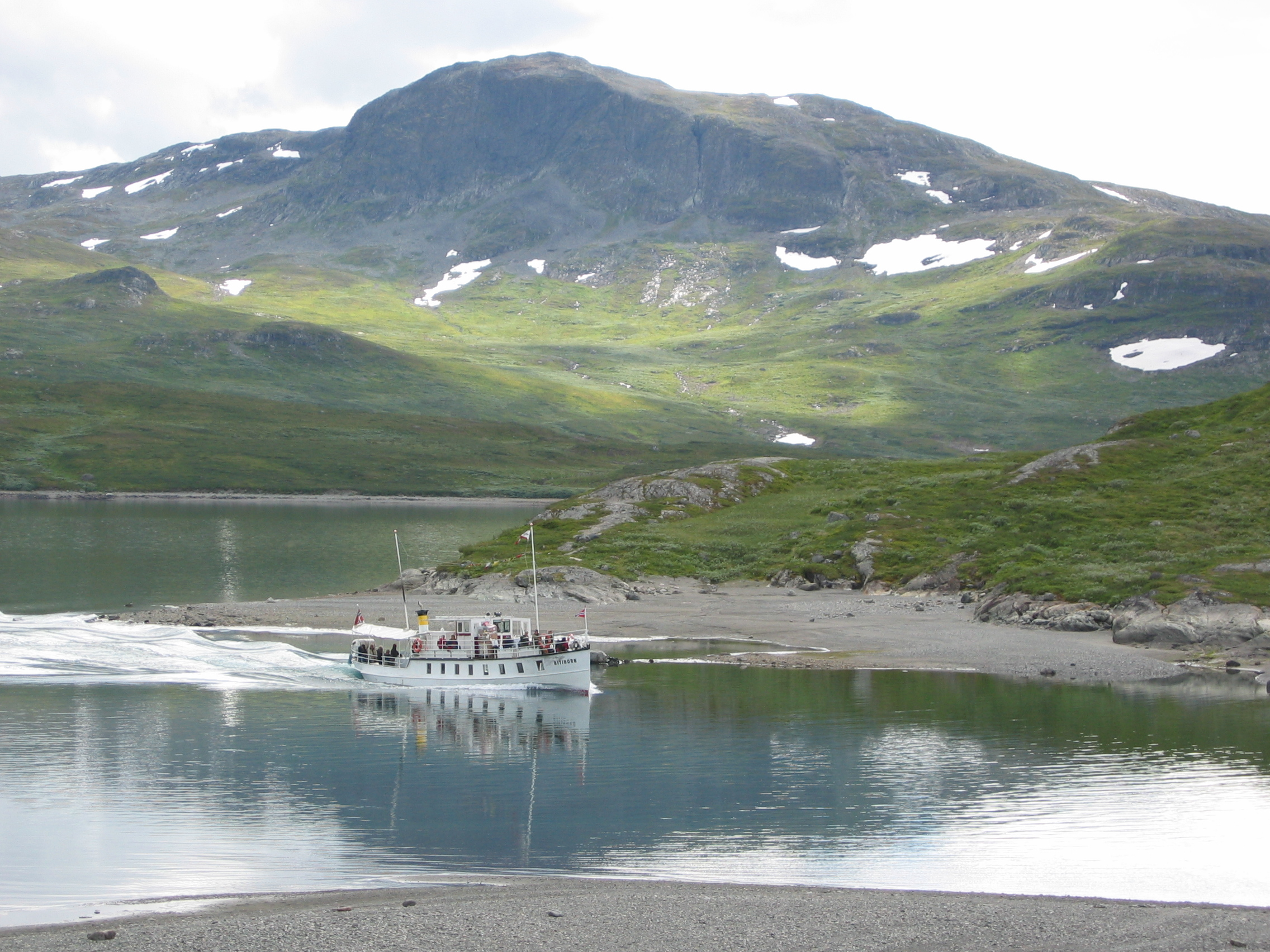
- MB Bitihorn on Bygdin
- Interactive map of the lake
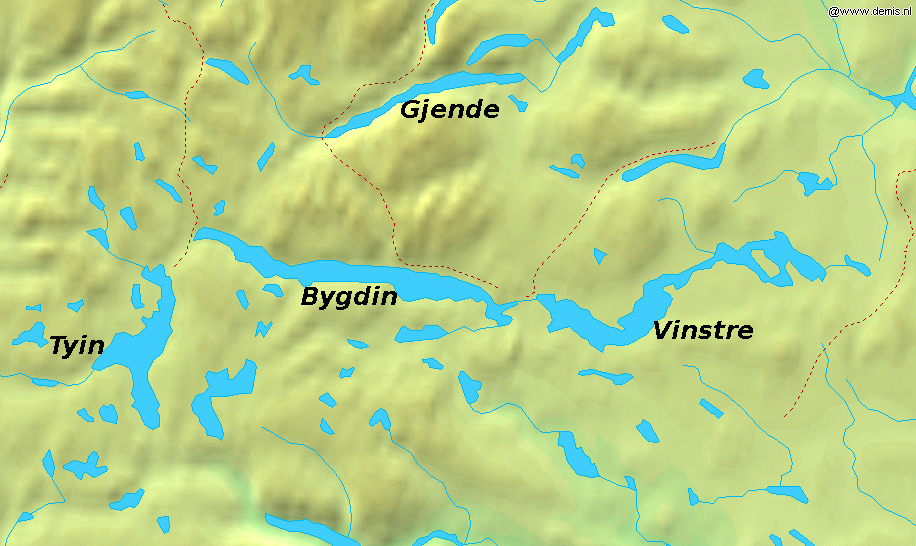
- Location: Vang Municipality, Innlandet
- Coordinates: 61°21′47″N 08°23′09″E
- Type: glacier / mountain lake
- Primary inflows: Breidløypa, Høystakka, Mjølkedøla, Torfinnsdøla and Vøla
- Primary outflows: Vinsteråni
- Catchment area: 305.59 km^{2} (117.99 sq mi)
- Basin countries: Norway
- Max. length: 25 km (16 mi)
- Max. width: 2.1 km (1.3 mi)
- Surface area: 40.03 km^{2} (15.46 sq mi)
- Average depth: 52 m (171 ft)
- Max. depth: 215 m (705 ft)
- Water volume: 2.08 km^{3} (0.50 cu mi)
- Surface elevation: 1,048–1,057 m (3,438–3,468 ft)
- References: NVE

Bygdin is a lake in Vang Municipality in Innlandet county, Norway. The 40-square-kilometre (15 sq mi) is located in the southern part of the Jotunheimen mountain range. The 25-kilometre (16 mi) long, narrow mountain lake is located between the large lakes Tyin (to the west) and Vinstre to the east.

The depth of Bygdin is regulated for hydroelectric power generation at nearby power plants. The normal level of the water lies between 1,048–1,057 metres (3,438–3,468 ft) above sea level. The maximum depth of the lake is 215 metres (705 ft). The Vinsteråni river runs out Bygdin, passes through the Vinstre and Vinstervatna lakes and into the river Vinstra. That river later flows into the Gudbrandsdalslågen river.

Bygdin lies to the southeast part of the Jotunheimen and north of the lake lies a mountainous area that often reaches elevations over 2,000 metres (6,600 ft). Some of the notable mountains located along the shores of the lake include Galdeberget, Torfinnstindene, and Nørdre Kalvehølotinden. Along the lake there are many tourist huts. On the west end lies Eidsbugarden, on the north side lies the cabins at Torfinnsbu and on the east side lies the mountain hotel Bygdin Høyfjellshotell. In the summer, these huts are connected by boat and in winter by ski or snowmobile.

A memorial was raised in 1909 to the Norwegian poet Aasmund Olavsson Vinje (1818-1870) at the western end of Bygdin at Eidsbugarden on the outskirts of Jotunheim National Park where he had a private hut. Friends and followers commemorated his contribution to appreciation of Norwegian nature and strengthening of the Norwegian national identity. Today, Eidsbugarden is a rather large mountain tourist centre, with a hotel from 1909 which is being restored to reopen in the summer 2007, a Norwegian Mountain Touring Association (DNT) cabin and approximately 160 private huts.

== Transportation ==
MB Bitihorn is a vessel that has operated on Bygdin every summer since 1912. The boat was built at Glommen Mechanical Works in Fredrikstad, Norway, and assembled at Bygdin. The route between Bygdin and Eidsbugarden has two departures daily, and there is capacity for 98 passengers on the boat trip.

== See also ==
- List of lakes in Norway
