= Mesmogtinden =

Mountain in Innlandet, Norway

- Interactive map of the mountain

Highest point
- Elevation: 2,264 m (7,428 ft)
- Prominence: 772 m (2,533 ft)
- Parent peak: Store Knutsholstinden
- Isolation: 2.6 km (1.6 mi)
- Coordinates: 61°24′14″N 8°32′03″E

Geography
- Location: Innlandet, Norway
- Parent range: Jotunheimen
- Topo map: 1617 IV Gjende

Mesmogtinden is a mountain in Vågå Municipality in Innlandet county, Norway. The 2,264-metre (7,428 ft) tall mountain is located in the Jotunheimen mountains within Jotunheimen National Park. The mountain sits about 60 kilometres (37 mi) southwest of the village of Vågåmo and about 25 kilometres (16 mi) northwest of the village of Beitostølen. The mountain is surrounded by several other notable mountains including Store Svartdalspiggen to the northwest, Langedalstinden to the southwest, Kvitskardtinden to the southeast, and Knutsholstinden to the northeast. There is a glacier to the east and the west of the mountain peak.

== See also ==
- List of mountains of Norway by height
