= Knutsholstinden =

Mountain in Innlandet, Norway

- Store Knutsholstinden (unofficial)
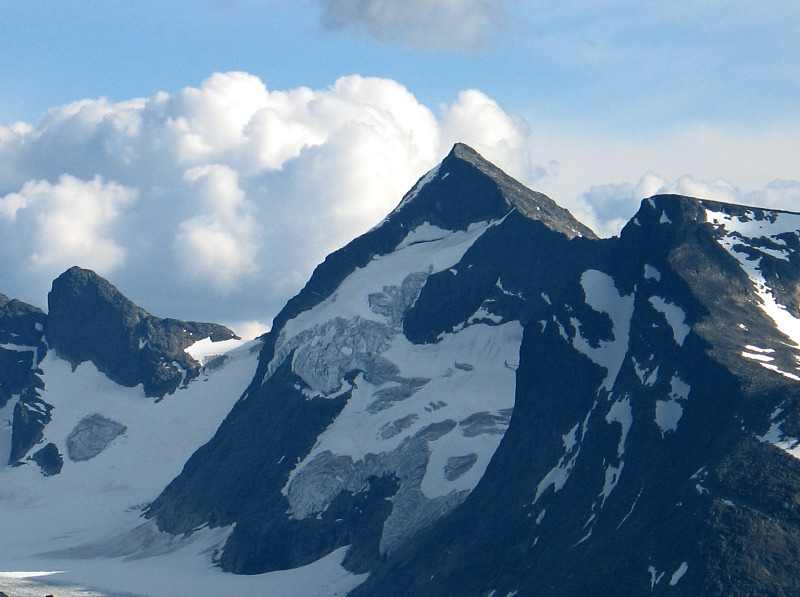
- Seen from the north, from Raudhamran by Surtningssue

Highest point
- Elevation: 2,342 m (7,684 ft)
- Prominence: 969 m (3,179 ft)
- Isolation: 12.1 km (7.5 mi)
- Listing: #14 in Norway
- Coordinates: 61°25′28″N 8°33′43″E

Geography
- Interactive map of the mountain
- Location: Innlandet, Norway
- Parent range: Jotunheimen
- Topo map: 1617 IV Gjende

Climbing
- First ascent: 13 July 1875 (Johannes Thomassen Heftye, Knut Lykken, Gullik Gulliksen Lid)

Knutsholstinden is a mountain in Vågå Municipality in Innlandet county, Norway. The 2,342-metre (7,684 ft) tall mountain is located in the Jotunheimen mountains within Jotunheimen National Park. The mountain sits about 60 kilometres (37 mi) southwest of the village of Vågåmo and about 25 kilometres (16 mi) northwest of the village of Beitostølen. The mountain is surrounded by several other notable mountains including Skarvflytindene to the east, Leirungstinden and Vesle Knutsholstinden to the southeast, Store Svartdalspiggen to the west, and Nordre Knutsholstinden to the north.

== Name ==
The first element is the genitive of the name of the large gorge Knutsholet. The last element is the finite form of tind which means 'mountain peak'. The name of the gorge is a compound of the male name Knut and hol which means 'hole', 'hollow', or 'gorge'. The reason for the name, and who the person Knut was, is unknown. The prefix store means 'the big' or 'the great'.

== Disputes ==
Johannes Heftye made the first ascent of Store Knutsholstinden in 1875.

William Cecil Slingsby made the first ascent of the higher Store Skagastølstind in 1876 which was hailed as a major achievement, and Heftye soon felt it eclipsed his own first ascent of Store Knutsholstinden the year before. He set out to ascend Store Skagastølstind in 1880 and successfully used the popular route that is now named after him to reach the summit. His main claim was that Store Knutsholstind was at least as difficult as Storen, thus, must be regarded a first grade mountain.

While Heftye's route on Store Knutsholstind may have been slightly more difficult than Slingsby's route on Storen, Heftye was at the time unaware that there were an easier route on Store Knutsholstind. Slingsby was approached by Marie Sønstenes, a woman who lived on farm near Store Knutsholstind, who claimed that she knew a straightforward route. Together, they ascended the mountain by this route. Heftye, who was very outspoken against female mountaineers, was humiliated and deeply offended.

== See also ==
- List of mountains of Norway by height
