= First Republic of Armenia =

1918–1920 country in Western Asia

Coordinates: 40°10′34″N 44°30′51″E

Republic of Armenia Հայաստանի Հանրապետություն (Armenian)
- 1918–1920
- Flag Coat of arms
- Anthem: Մեր Հայրենիք; Mer Hayrenik "Our Fatherland"
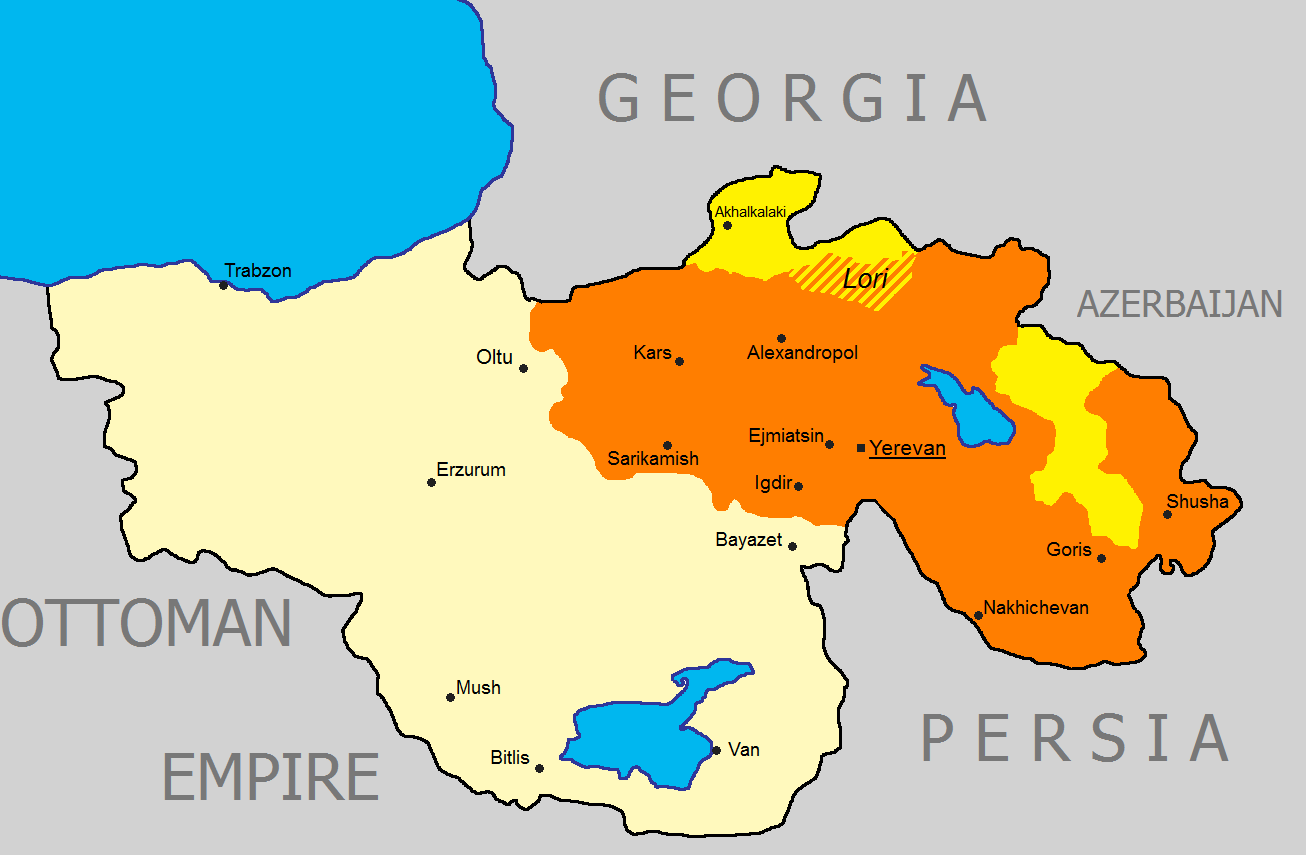
- First Republic of Armenia in 1918–1920 with territorial claims and disputed areas
- Capital: Yerevan (Note: During the existence of the First Republic of Armenia, Yerevan was known as Erivan (Russian: Эривань), its name in the Russian Empire.)
- Official languages: Armenian
- Common languages: Armenian; Azerbaijani; Russian; Greek
- Ethnic groups (Note: including only the de facto controlled parts (orange in the map)): Armenians: 60.1%; Tatars: (Note: Before 1918, Azerbaijanis were generally known as "Tatars". This term, employed by the Russians, referred to Turkic-speaking Muslims of the South Caucasus. After 1918, with the establishment of the Azerbaijan Democratic Republic and "especially during the Soviet era", the Tatar group identified itself as "Azerbaijani".) 32.8%; Kurds: 3.3%; Yazidis: 1.1%; Turks: 0.7%; Others: (Note: Mainly Russians, Georgians, Greeks and Roma.) 2.0%
- Government: Unitary parliamentary republic with an executive presidency: (under a provisional government (28 May – 1 August 1918))
- Prime Minister
  - June 1918 – May 1919: Hovhannes Kajaznuni
  - May 1919 – May 1920: Alexander Khatisian
  - May–November 1920: Hamo Ohanjanyan
  - November–December 1920: Simon Vratsian
- Legislature: Khorhrdaran
- Historical era: Interwar period
  - Declaration of Independence: 28 May 1918
  - Act of United Armenia: 28 May 1919
  - De jure recognition in the Treaty of Sèvres: 10 August 1920
  - Sovietisation: 2 December 1920

Area
- 1918 (after the Treaty of Batum): 11,396 km^{2} (4,400 sq mi)
- 1919 (after the Armistice of Mudros): 45,325 km^{2} (17,500 sq mi)
- 1919 Paris Peace Conference memorandum (Note: The territorial claims in this memorandum only included Armenia's claims in Russian Armenia, excluding Ottoman Armenia. See the 1919 map titled "La république de l'Arménie".): 67,000–70,000 km^{2} (26,000–27,000 sq mi)
- 1920 (after the Treaty of Alexandropol): 27,000–30,044 km^{2} (10,425–11,600 sq mi)
- 1921 (projected after implementing the Treaty of Sèvres) (Note: See Wilsonian Armenia § Demographics for the projected ethno-religious composition of Armenia one year after incorporating Wilsonian Armenia.): 155,000 km^{2} (60,000 sq mi)

Population
  - 1918 (after the Treaty of Batum): 900,000
  - 1919 (after the Armistice of Mudros): 1,510,000
  - 1919 Paris Peace Conference memorandum: 2,159,000
  - 1920 (after the Treaty of Alexandropol): 720,000
  - 1921 (projected after implementing the Treaty of Sèvres) (Note: See Wilsonian Armenia § Demographics for the projected ethno-religious composition of Armenia one year after incorporating Wilsonian Armenia.): 3,000,000
- Currency: Armenian ruble
Preceded by
Transcaucasian Democratic Federative Republic
Succeeded by
Republic of Mountainous Armenia
Armenian Soviet Socialist Republic
Turkey
- Today part of: Armenia; Azerbaijan; Turkey; Georgia

The First Republic of Armenia, officially known at the time of its existence as the Republic of Armenia, (Note: Armenian: Հայաստանի Հանրապետություն, classical orthography: Հայաստանի Հանրապետութիւն, romanized: Hayastani Hanrapetut'yun) was an independent Armenian state that existed from May (28th de jure, 30th de facto) 1918 to 2 December 1920 in the Armenian-populated territories of the former Russian Empire known as Eastern or Russian Armenia. The republic was established in May 1918, with its capital in the city of Yerevan, after the dissolution of the short-lived Transcaucasian Federation. It was the first Armenian state since the Middle Ages.

In its first year of independence, Armenia was confined to a small territory around Lake Sevan after its invasion by the Ottoman Empire during the Caucasus campaign. Following the Armistice of Mudros, Armenia expanded its borders in the wake of the Ottoman withdrawal, leading to a brief border war with neighbouring Georgia. During its first winter, hundreds of thousands of refugees in the country who had fled the Armenian genocide died from starvation or exposure. In the spring of 1919, Armenia, with British support, incorporated the formerly occupied regions of Kars and Nakhchivan, thereby tripling in size since independence; however, Armenian control of these regions collapsed during the Muslim uprisings that erupted in the summer of 1919.

In late 1919, the isolated Armenian region of Zangezur came under attack by neighbouring Azerbaijan. The fighting subsided until an Armenian rebellion was launched in March of the following year in Nagorno-Karabakh (then under provisional Azerbaijani rule), ending in April after Azerbaijan's sovietisation. In August 1920, Armenian representatives at the Paris Peace Conference signed the Treaty of Sèvres, which awarded Armenia an additional 40,000 square miles (100,000 square kilometres) of territory in Western Armenia, albeit the treaty was never implemented. In late 1920, Armenia was invaded by Kemalist Turkey, ending with its partition and sovietisation by the Russian SFSR, with the latter founding the superseding Armenian Soviet Socialist Republic. Shortly thereafter, an anti-Bolshevik revolt resisted Soviet authority from February to July 1921.

In the two and a half years of its existence, Armenia formed diplomatic relations with 40 countries, gained de jure recognition, underwent parliamentary elections, and founded its first university. The nation's parliament and government were dominated by the broad Armenian Revolutionary Federation party (commonly referred to as the Dashnaks), however, the cabinet posts were initially shared with the "bourgeois" Armenian Populist Party and later, Social Revolutionaries.

== Name ==
Since Armenia's gaining of independence from the Soviet Union in 1991, in Armenia and modern historiography, the state is referred to as the First Republic of Armenia (Հայաստանի Առաջին Հանրապետություն) or the First Republic for short. Other names of the state include the Araratian Republic (Արարատյան հանրապետություն, 'Ararat Republic'), as the republic was largely based around Mount Ararat; Further names include the Republic of Erivan, and the Erivan Republic, as Yerevan was the principal city of the republic. These terms were often used by Ottoman Armenians and the Armenian diaspora who regarded the country as "only a dusty province without Ottoman Armenia whose salvation Armenians had been seeking for 40 years". It has also been known as the Dashnak Republic due to the fact that the Dashnaks were the dominant political force in the country. During the Soviet-era, the Soviet Armenian Encyclopedia referred to the state as the Bourgeois Republic of Armenia (Հայաստանի Բուրժուական Հանրապետություն).

== Background ==
=== Loss of statehood and national awakening ===
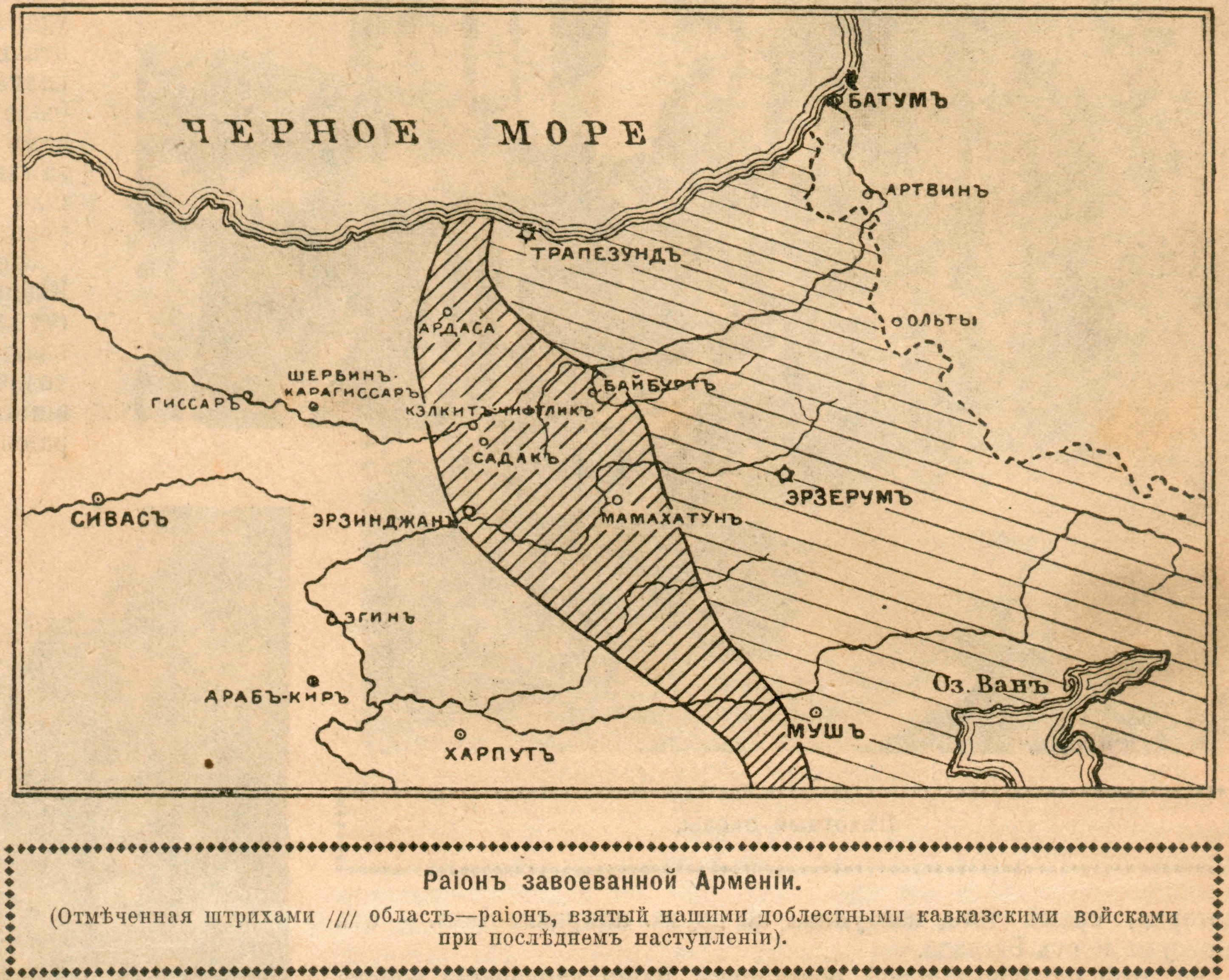
Caucasian Front WWI. The territory of Western Armenia occupied by Armenian Russian troops in the summer-autumn of 1916. Niva Magazine – 1916

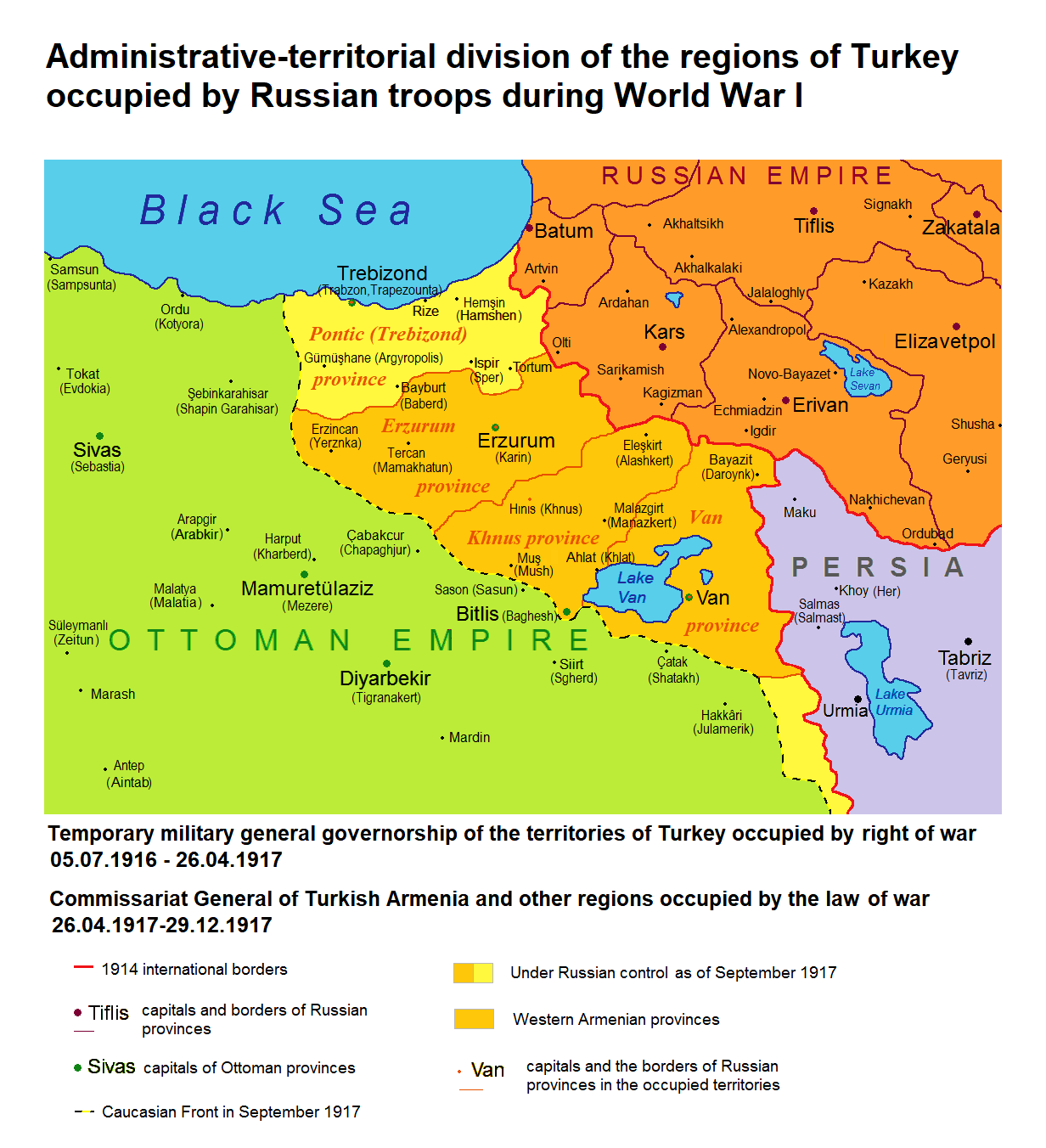
Administrative-territorial division of Armenia and other territories of the Ottoman Empire occupied by Russian troops in the fall of 1917

Sources vary on when Armenian statehood was lost. Though the Armenian Kingdom of Cilicia ceased to exist in 1375, other sources suggest that Armenian statehood was lost in 1045 with the fall of Bagratid Armenia as Cilician Armenia was outside of the traditional Armenian homeland, while Bagratid Armenia was the last major independent Armenian state in the Armenian Highlands. In the centuries after losing its independence, Armenia remained mostly under Muslim Turkic or Persian rule until the Russian annexation of the Karabakh Khanate in 1801 and the khanates of Erivan and Nakhichevan in 1828. Due to Russian colonial policies, large numbers of Armenians from Persia and the Ottoman Empire repatriated to Russian Armenia. Armenians had already formed a majority in some regions, such as Nagorno-Karabakh, and this migration bolstered their numbers in the area. In particular, the Erivan Governorate regained an Armenian majority for the first time in several hundred years, and these regions would later "form the nucleus" of an independent Armenia.

Armenian nationalism was rooted in the "long textual tradition" of clerics and scholars. According to historians Edmund Herzig and Marina Kurkchiyan, "in the late eighteenth and through the nineteenth centuries a coherent sense of Armenians as a nation with a distinct and distinguished history was spread by patriots, teachers, writers, and revolutionaries". The Russian offensive during the Caucasus campaign of World War I, the subsequent occupation and creation of a provisional administrative government gave hope for ending Ottoman Turkish rule in Western Armenia. With the help of several battalions of Armenians recruited from the Russian Empire, the Russian Imperial Army advanced as far as the city of Erzurum in 1916, continuing to make considerable advances even after the toppling of Tsar Nicholas II in February 1917.

=== Transcaucasian Democratic Federative Republic ===
Following news of the Bolshevik coup in Russia, the Ozakom (a committee formed in February by the Russian Provisional Government to oversee the Caucasus) was superseded by a caretaker government known as the Transcaucasian Commissariat on 28 November 1917, which would later form the nucleus of the Transcaucasian Democratic Federative Republic (TDFR). As Russian and Ottoman armies, despite the revolution, were still engaged in combat, the Transcaucasian Commissariat signed the Armistice of Erzincan with the Ottoman Empire on 18 December.

On 30 January 1918, the Ottoman Empire in violation of the armistice, launched an offensive to recapture Western Armenia. Delegates of the major South Caucasian political parties established the Transcaucasian Seim—the representative and legislative body of the TDFR—on 23 February, with the Dashnaks representing the Armenians, the Musavat the Muslims and Caucasian Tatars, and the Mensheviks the Georgians. On 2 March, a delegation from the Seim was scheduled to depart to participate in the Trebizond Peace Conference with the Ottoman Empire; however, by the time of the conference, Soviet Russia had signed the Treaty of Brest-Litovsk with the Central Powers, ceding Kars and Batum to the Ottomans. From the outset of the Trebizond Peace Conference, the Ottomans demanded that the Treaty of Brest-Litovsk serve as the basis of peace negotiations, which was only accepted by the Trancaucasian delegates weeks later on 5 April. Due to this delay, the Ottomans continued their advance and reached the pre-war 1914 Russo-Turkish frontier by the end of March.

On 11 May, a new peace conference was convened in Batum; the Ottoman delegation stated that as the Ottoman Empire and TDFR were in a state of war, they would no longer recognise Brest-Litovsk and instead presented an alternative treaty by which the TDFR would be also obligated to cede western sectors of the Erivan and Tiflis governorates. Without awaiting the TDFR's consent to the new terms, the Ottomans resumed their offensive in Armenia on 21 May, leading to the battles of Abaran, Karakilisa, and Sardarabad, whereby local Armenian forces emerged victorious. In retaliation for their losses, the Turkish divisions defeated by Armenians massacred several thousand villagers. On 26 May, after secret negotiations with Germany, the Georgian delegates of the Seim declared the independence of Georgia; Azerbaijan followed suit two days later.

== History ==
=== May – September 1918 ===
==== Declaration of independence ====
With the collapse of the TDFR, the Armenian National Council, based in Tiflis (present-day Tbilisi) and led by Russian Armenian intellectuals representing Armenian interests in the Caucasus, declared Armenia's independence on 28 May 1918. The council dispatched Hovhannes Kajaznuni and Alexander Khatisian, both Dashnaks, to Yerevan to assume power, and issued the following "intentionally vague" statement on 30 May (retroactive to 28 May):

In view of the dissolution of the political unity of Transcaucasia and the new situation created by the proclamation of the independence of Georgia and Azerbaijan, the Armenian National Council declares itself to be the supreme and only administration for the Armenian provinces. Because of the certain grave circumstances, the national council, deferring until the near future the formation of an Armenian National government, temporarily assumes all governmental functions, in order to take hold the political and administrative helm of the Armenian provinces.

With the success in the May battles in Abaran, Karakilisa, and Sardarabad, Armenian commander Movses Silikian was urged by the Armenian military command to chase out the Turks whilst they were on the run, however, Silikian refused and ordered his forces to halt. This is due to the fact that the Armenian forces' ammunition were nearly exhausted, and the Turks' reinforcements were close. According to the UCLA historian Richard G. Hovannisian, "If peace were not concluded and the tide of victory turned in favor of the Ottomans, the consequences would be disastrous".

==== Treaty of Batum ====
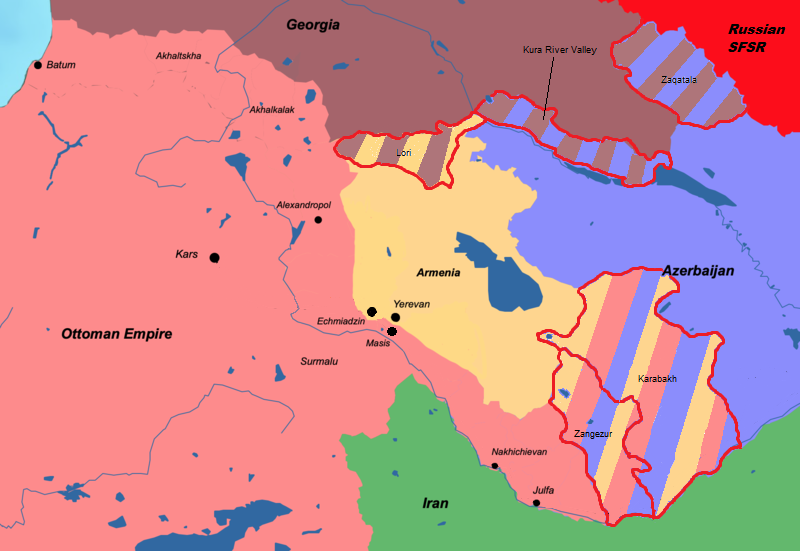
A map of the Treaty of Batum

Armenian negotiators on 30 May informed the Ottoman delegation at Batum that Armenia would accept Turkish conditions for peace, thereby initiating the Batum Conference between Armenia and the Ottoman Empire. The Ottomans, in refusing to countenance Armenian pretensions to the highland portion of the Elizavetpol Governorate, offered Armenia the entirety of the Nor Bayazet uezd, and parts of the Erivan, Etchmiadzin, and Alexandropol counties, essentially confining it to an area of 4,000 square miles (10,000 square kilometres). When news of the Armenian victories at Abaran, Karakilisa, and Sardarabad reached the conference, the Ottomans agreed to a "minor territorial rectification" whereby an additional 400 square miles (1,000 square kilometres) in the Alexandropol uezd were relinquished "for the sake of the friendly relations that have begun". The Treaty of Batum was thereafter signed on 4 June.

In June 1918, German officials informed Armenian representatives in Istanbul that Germany would not recognise the Treaty of Batum. Though denying Armenia official recognition, Germany promised a conference whereby the treaties would be "revised". Armenian representatives in the Ottoman capital humbled themselves as to "expressing gratitude" to the unsympathetic Enver Pasha for tolerating the Armenian republic's establishment. Enver rejected any notion of the Armenian republic expanding its borders, observing that he had consented to "a small Armenian state that could never in any way affect the interests of the new Turkish empire".

=== October 1918 – June 1919 ===
==== Armistice of Mudros ====
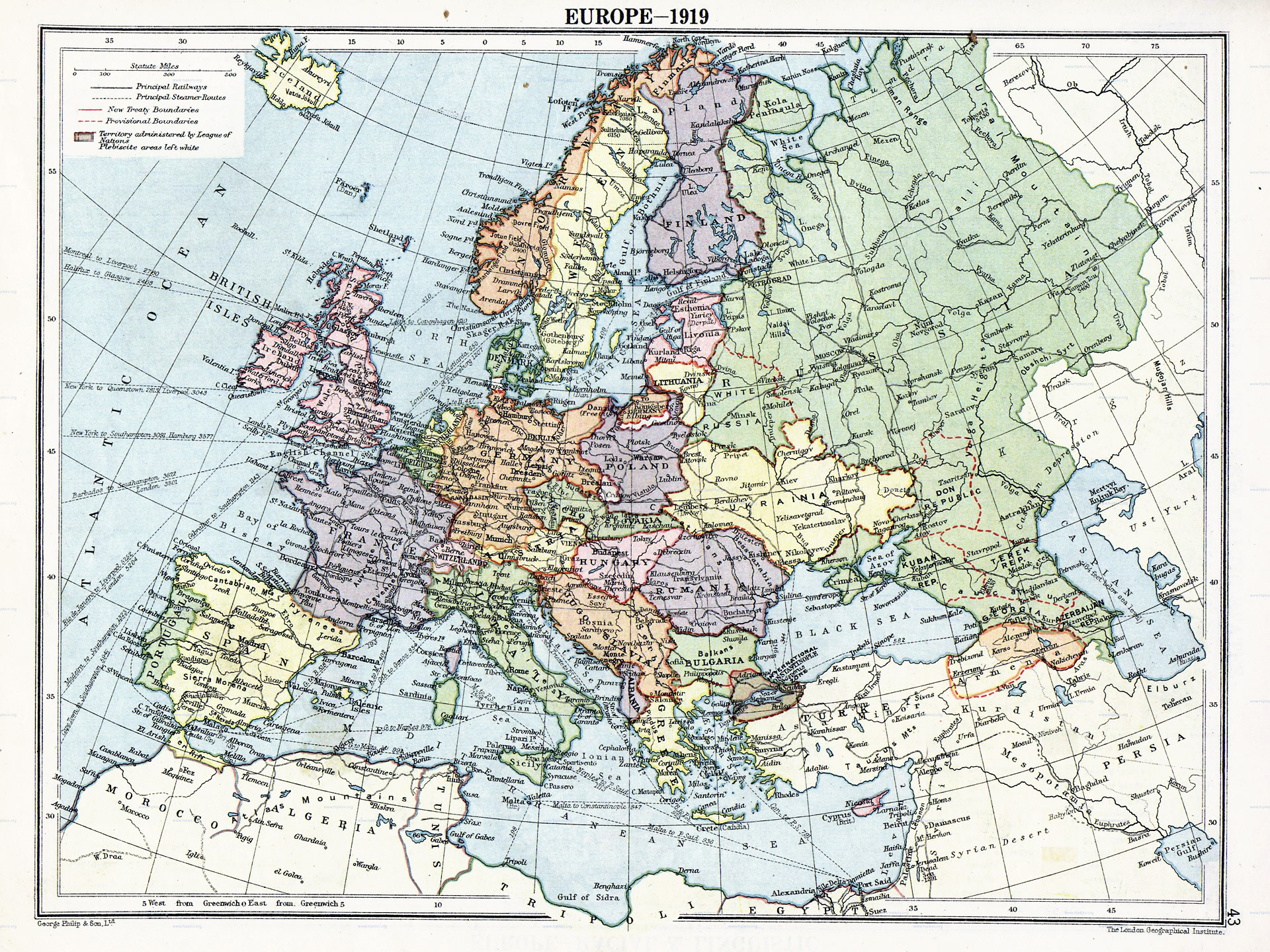
First Republic of Armenia in map of Europe, 1919

On 30 October 1918, the Armistice of Mudros was signed, thus ending hostilities between the Ottoman Empire and the Allies. The armistice only stipulated the Ottomans' withdrawal to the Treaty of Brest-Litovsk boundaries, thereby allowing their armies to winter in Kars and Batum. Throughout November, Ottoman forces evacuated the Erivan Governorate, thereby Armenia gained 6,000 square miles (16,000 square kilometres) of formerly-occupied territory.

An estimated 50,000–100,000 Armenians had been massacred during the Turkish invasion of May–September 1918, including 25,000 in the Kars Oblast. According to Fridtjof Nansen, a Norwegian relief worker who cared for Ottoman Armenian refugees, "[i]t was obviously the intent of the Turkish leaders to exterminate the Armenian people even in Russian Armenia." In the Akhalkalaki uezd, claimed by Armenia, 60,000 of 110,000 inhabitants had survived, over seventy villages were completely destroyed by the Turkish army in 1918. In the six-months of Turkish occupation of Eastern Armenia, particularly in the region of Pambak, (Note: Mostly corresponding to south of the present-day Lori Province.) Armenians were used as "bayonet practice" by Turkish soldiers. Hovannisian estimates that at least 8,000 young men were taken to Erzurum for slave labour, and 125,000 livestock, 30,000 agricultural equipment, 6,000 carts and 18,000 tons of foodstuffs were confiscated by the retreating Ottoman army. The richest areas were left barren, stripped of crops, animals, tools, and any movable possessions. Little trace remained of the former Armenian villages, with all clothing, furniture, utensils, pottery, and even doors and windows taken. Along the railway, no functioning locomotives or freight cars were left, and each station lay in ruins. In Alexandropol, rubble filled the streets after the Turks set off explosives and ammunition before withdrawing. Hovannisian further adds: "As the Armenian soldiers advanced, the full significance of the saying, 'the Turk has passed here,' (Note: In Armenian, "the Turk has passed here" (այստեղով թուրքն է անցել, aysteġov t’urk’n ē anc’el) is an adage referring to the destruction historically sown by Turkic people in the Armenian highlands. It was also mentioned in the poem "In the ruins of Seysulan" (Սեյսուլանի ավերակներում) contained in Aris Arseni's collection book of poems.) was bruisingly demonstrated". As a result of the Turkish invasion, 200 villages were plundered, half the vineyards in the Aras River valley were ruined, 200,000 large-horned animals were chased away in addition to thousands of carts of agricultural implements, and 80 percent of households were deprived of a horse and almost half deprived of a cow or ox.

==== Armeno-Georgian War ====
On 18 October 1918, as the Ottoman Empire was preparing itself to capitulate to the Allies, Armenian forces entered southern Lori and came into contact with German–Georgian forces. In response, the Georgian army bolstered its presence in the region. These manoeuvres set the scene for an Armeno-Georgian military confrontation. The territorial conflict with Georgia was rooted in the contention over the counties of Akhalkalaki and Borchaly, particularly, the Lori subdistrict of the latter—both sectors possessed an Armenian ethnic majority. Under Georgian control, the Armenians of Lori were discontent due to their treatment by the soldiers—using this pretext, Armenia fomented insurrection, thereby elevating tensions.

Skirmishes began on 7 December, and escalated in Armenia's favour, with them coming within 30 miles (48 kilometres) of Tiflis, after which Allied representatives demanded a ceasefire. Armenia was unsuccessful in its objective of occupying lands up to the Khrami river and was pushed back by Georgian forces to the village of Sadakhlo by the time of the ceasefire which came into effect at midnight on 31 December. In spite of being pushed back in the last days of the war, Armenia was successful in loosening Georgian control over northern Lori, which the latter had held before the war, insomuch as the region was designated a neutral zone under British supervision.

==== Refugees and winter of 1918–1919 ====
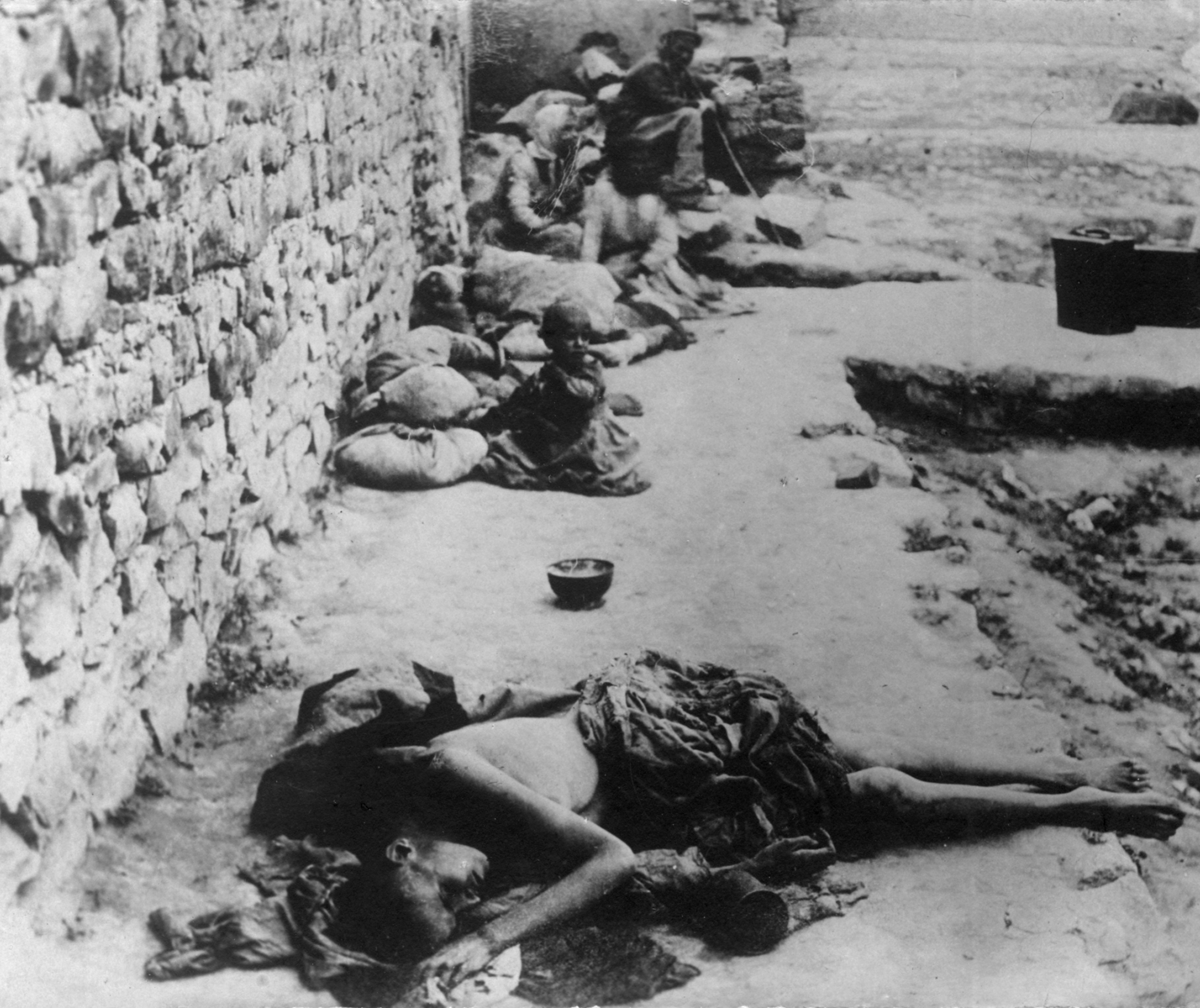
Starving children on a street in Armenia

Yale historian Firuz Kazemzadeh wrote that Armenia in the summer of 1918 was packed with "at least six hundred thousand refugees", one of the factors that led him to write that "of the three Transcaucasian republics Armenia suffered the greatest hardship in the fateful years 1918–1920". By December 1918, there remained 350,000 refugees distributed throughout the Armenian republic, in addition to 30,000 who had accompanied Armenian partisan commander Andranik to Zangezur. In February of the following year, the number of refugees fell to 263,393. During this period, there was a flow of Western Armenian refugees from Azerbaijan and the North Caucasus. In 1918 to the spring of 1919, the number of refugees from Western Armenia was estimated to be 300,000, with 100,000 residing in "makeshift shelters or abandoned military barracks" in Alexandropol alone. In November 1919, the number of refugees again rose, reaching 333,170 and consisting of 284,870 Western Armenians and 48,300 Eastern Armenians. In April of the following year, the number of refugees declined to 310,835. By late 1920, about 360,000 (almost half of Armenia's population of 720,000) or 200,000 refugees remained.

By the time relief aid reached Armenia, some 150,000–180,000 refugees (20 percent of the population) had perished due to famine, exposure, or hunger. According to a report from February 1919, 40 percent of the inhabitants of the district of Sardarapat had died. By April 1919, 40 percent of the inhabitants of eight villages near Etchmiadzin and 25 percent of the sixteen villages in Ashtarak perished. During the winter, the population of the district of Talin declined by 50 percent, and nearly 60 percent of Armenians in Surmalu died of starvation. American historian Richard Pipes writes that Soviet estimates place the number of Armenians who perished due to famine and disease at 300,000. In 1919, 19,000 inhabitants of Yerevan contracted typhus and 10,000 died from exposure, famine, and pestilence. By mid-1919, 200,000 inhabitants of Armenia had perished; according to Hovannisian, there were 8.7 births and 204.2 deaths per 1,000 persons, yielding a net loss of 195.5—"it was verily a land of death". According to the data of the Ministry of Internal Affairs, 192,000 people died due to the typhus epidemic and famine by the summer of 1919.

==== Annexation of Kars and Nakhchivan ====
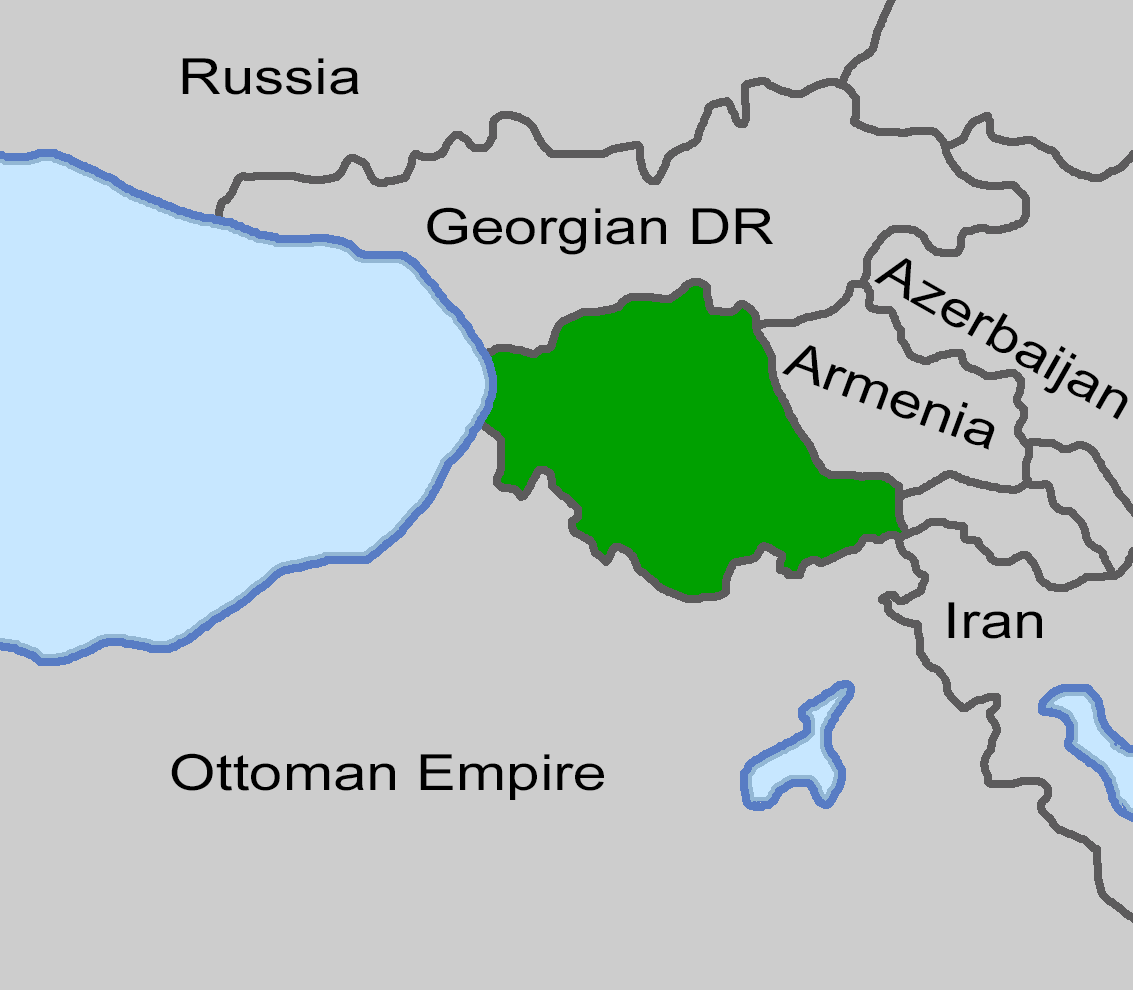
The Southwest Caucasus Republic highlighted on a map in green

The Ninth Army of the Ottoman Empire occupied the Kars Oblast at the time of the Armistice of Mudros, being permitted to winter in the district until early 1919; on 7 January 1919, the British ordered their complete withdrawal to the pre-war Russo-Ottoman border. Intended to hinder the westward expansion of the fledgling Armenian and Georgian republics into the Kars Oblast, the Ottomans backed the establishment of the Southwest Caucasus Republic with moral support, also furnishing it with weapons, ammunition, and instructors. The Southwest Caucasus Republic administered the entire Kars and Batum oblasts as well as neighbouring occupied districts for some three months before provoking British intervention, leading to its capitulation by Armenian and British forces on 10 April 1919. British tolerance of the Southwest Caucasus Republic dissipated when it defied British directives by backing Muslim insurgents in the counties of Akhalkalaki and Akhaltsikhe to resist Georgia. This prompted the Georgian government to unite with Armenia's in opposing the Southwest Caucasus Republic's existence. Consequently, the Kars Oblast (excluding western Olti and northern Ardahan) was annexed to Armenia, falling under the civil governorship of Stepan Ghorghanyan—this allowed for the repatriation of 60,000 Armenians (out of more than 100,000 had fled in April 1918). As a result of the annexation, Armenia increased its territory to "more than 17,000 square miles (44,000 square kilometres)". In an announcement to parliament, Armenian prime minister Alexander Khatisian announced that as of 3 June 1919, 300,000 Armenians had been resettled in the Kars Oblast.

The Ottoman Empire also sponsored the creation of the Republic of Aras in the Muslim-dominated southern districts of the Erivan Governorate corresponding to Nakhchivan. Following the conclusion of the Armeno-Georgian War in late 1918, Armenia repositioned its forces to annex the Republic of Aras. Their advance into the district was halted by the establishment of a British governorship in the district, formed as a means to prevent clashes between Armenian soldiers and local Muslims of up to 10,000 armed men. British sympathy to the Aras Republic was reversed under the authority of Major-General William Montgomerie Thomson who suspected Pan-Turkic influence in Nakhchivan due to the presence of Azerbaijani and Ottoman envoys. Thomson believed that Azerbaijan and the Ottoman Empire were scheming to "forge a bridge between themselves". Gevorg Varshamyan was appointed to become the civil governor of the district. Armenia's annexation of Nakhchivan was announced on 3 May 1919, after which Armenian forces commanded by Drastamat Kanayan advanced southward into the district along the railway. On 13 May 1919, Khatisian arrived in Nakhchivan to discuss terms of capitulation with the minister of war of the Aras Republic, Kalb Ali Khan Nakhichevanskii, thereby effecting the annexation.

=== July 1919 – January 1920 ===
==== Muslim insurgencies ====
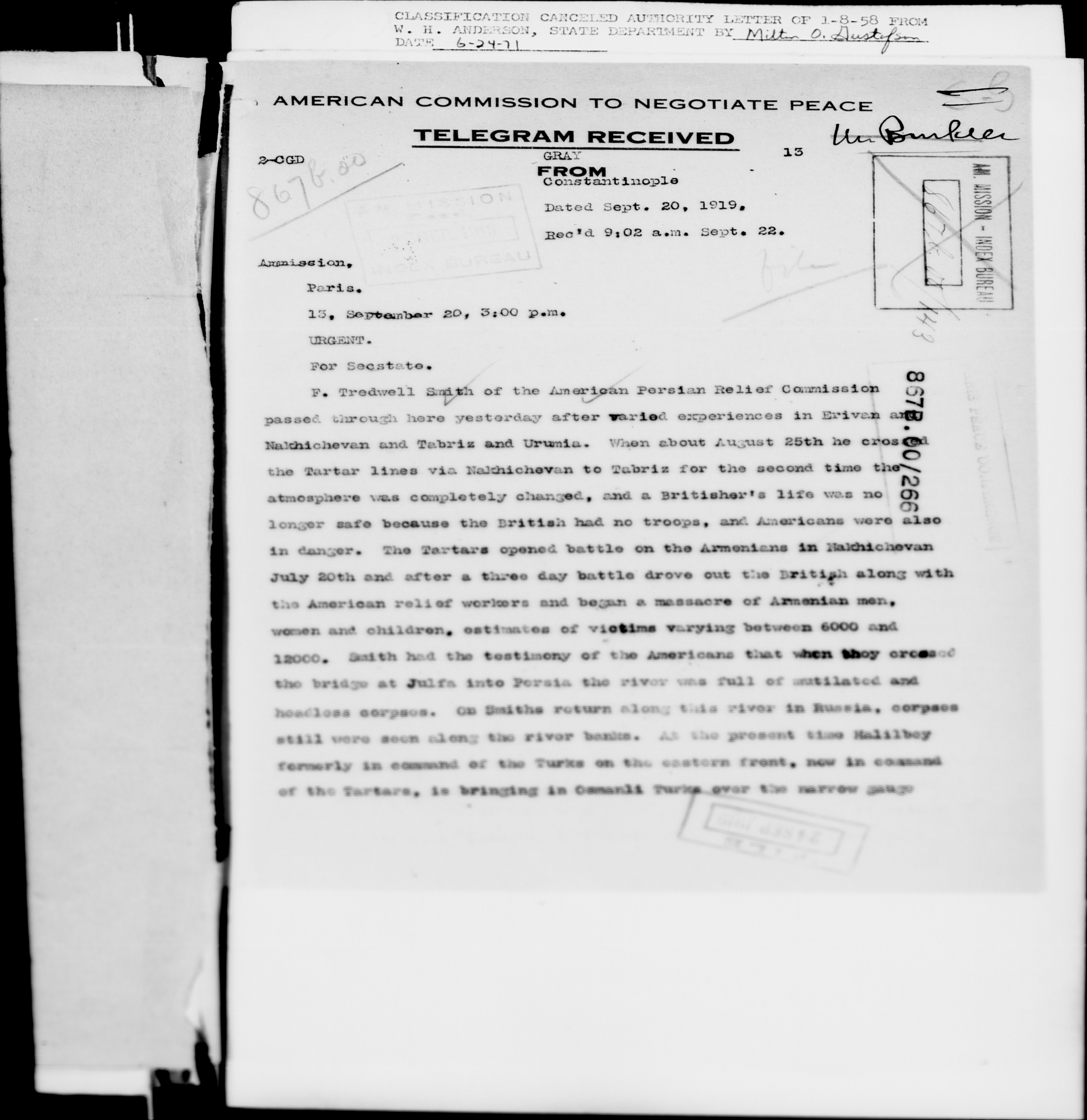
American Commission to Negotiate Peace telegram describing massacres around Nakhchivan

Beginning in July 1919, a series of insurgencies against Armenian rule erupted in the Kars and Nakhchivan regions, fostered by Azerbaijani and Turkish envoys who instructed local Muslims to resist. The insurgencies were motivated by the British military withdrawal from Armenia which took place in mid-June. The town of Böyük Vedi and the village cluster around it served as a symbol of defiance for Muslims in Armenia. As the insurgencies raged, the Azerbaijani diplomatic envoy to Armenia, Mahammad khan Takinski, transferred funds to the insurgents and apprised the Azerbaijani government of developments—earlier, he had worked to forestall the Armenian annexation of Nakhchivan.

Investigations by American relief workers confirmed the reports of large-scale massacres of the local Armenians in the Nakhchivan region, amounting to 10,000 dead and 45 villages destroyed. During the insurgencies, only the Volunteer Army of Anton Denikin sent ammunition to replenish the Armenian army. By late 1919, Armenia lost control of the peripheries of the Kars and Surmalu regions, as well as the entirety of Nakhchivan.

==== Armenian–Azerbaijani war ====
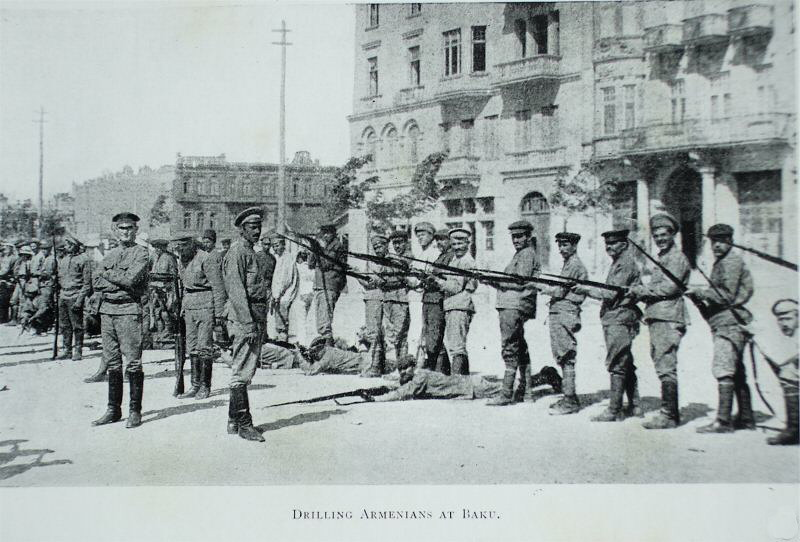
Armenian units drilling in Baku in 1918

In 1918, after attaining independence from Russia, the newly established Armenian and Azerbaijani republics engaged in a two-year war over their territorial ambitions. The disputed regions were principally Nakhchivan, Zangezur, and Nagorno-Karabakh. In the 18,000 km^{2} (6,900 mi^{2}) of mountainous highlands of the Elizavetpol Governorate which were mostly controlled by Azerbaijan yet claimed by Armenia, Armenians formed "nearly 70 percent of the population"; the claimed boundaries were designed to incorporate a maximum number of Armenians, 300,000, also incorporating "a minimum number of Muslims", 90,000. If Armenia successfully incorporated the highlands of Elizavetpol, its population, "according to pre-war statistics", would rise to 1.797 million, including 1.169 million Armenians. According to Hovannisian, a population exchange whilst practical was deemed "preposterous" for the Karabakh Armenians because the region's cession "to the Pan-Turanian fanatics will open the door to endless invasions, endanger the peace of the Orient, and shake the political equilibrium off its foundations".

Nagorno-Karabakh, despite initially being self-governed, capitulated to British–Azerbaijani pressure and became an autonomous part of Azerbaijan through an agreement signed on 22 August 1919, pending the Paris Peace Conference's decision on the inter-Caucasian borders. Before Nagorno-Karabakh's capitulation, Azerbaijani forces carried out a massacre of 600 Armenians in villages nearby Shusha to pressure the region's inhabitants into submission.

Andranik, who had been tasked with the defence of Erzurum, denounced the Dashnaks and Armenia for their treachery in seeking peace after gaining the upper hand in battle, seeing them as becoming "nothing more than an Ottoman vassal state". With his three-thousand-strong force, Andranik "pushed over Nakhichevan into Zangezur", where he remained for the duration of the war, destroying Tatar villages and expelling their inhabitants. Thereby the Armenians "retained control in Zangezur". In early November 1919, Azerbaijan launched a campaign to incorporate the region and absorb Muslim-controlled Nakhchivan, however, were forced to retreat some days later due to their defeat in battle, despite initially meeting success on all fronts.

==== Diplomacy ====
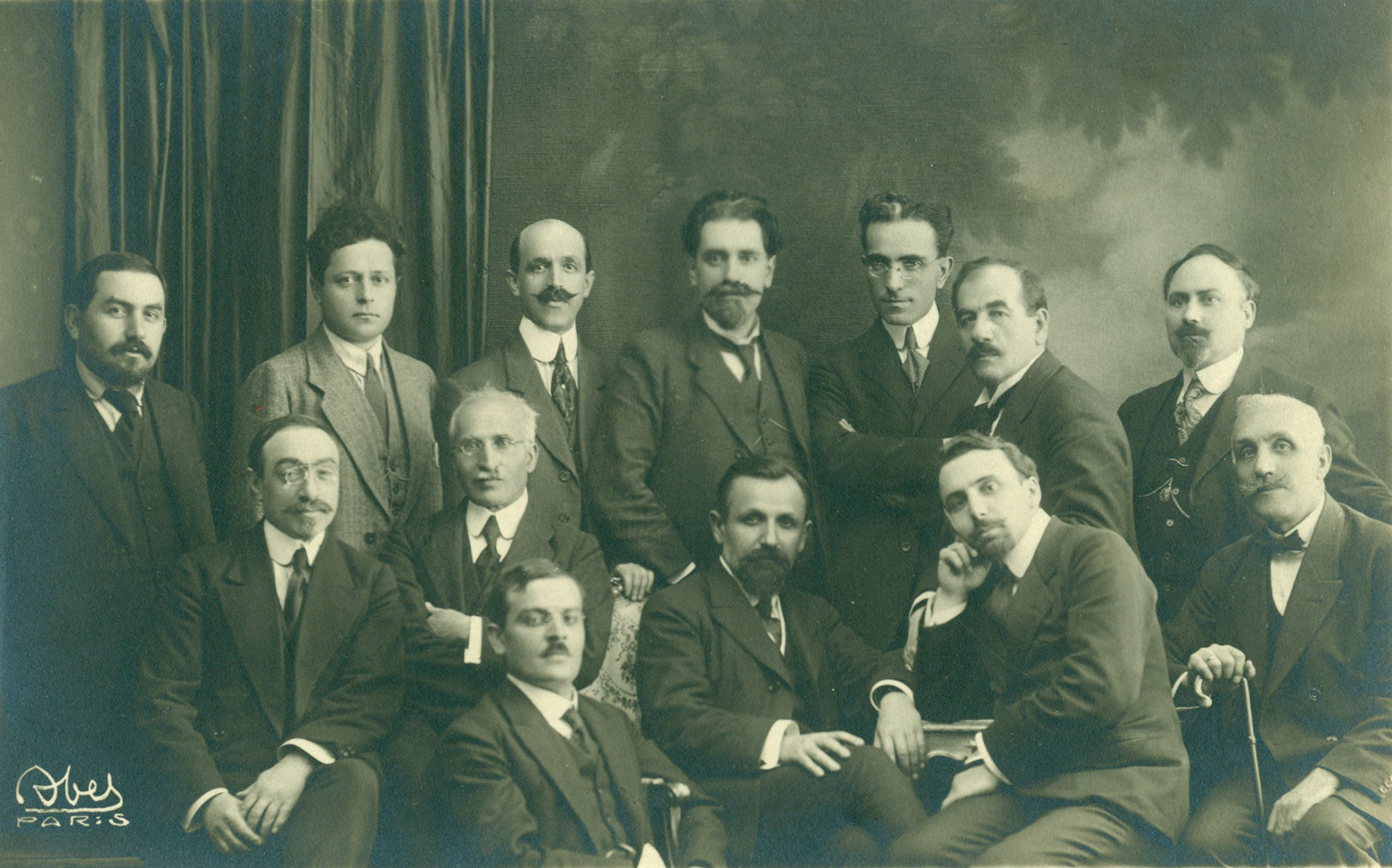
The Armenian delegation at the Paris Peace Conference

According to Hewsen, Armenia's foreign policy objectives consisted of "obtaining foreign aid to prevent its people from perishing, ... securing international recognition ... and ... placing Armenia under the protection of a specific foreign power". Despite the US sending $11 million (equivalent to $176,785,714 in 2025 in aid to Armenia, the vote for an American mandate over Armenia was rejected by the Senate on 1 June 1920. At the Paris Peace Conference, the delegation led by Avetis Aharonian from the Armenian republic united with the delegation from the Armenian diaspora, headed by Boghos Nubar, forming the "Delegation of Integral Armenia". With Greek and Russian backing, Armenia claimed territories of the defeated Ottoman Empire covering the Six Vilayets and Cilicia. The White Russian delegation, whilst refusing to tolerate the independence of Azerbaijan and Georgia, was willing to allow Russian Armenia to unite with Turkish Armenia, believing that "such a united Armenia will be our friend and even ally in the East". Greek prime minister Eleftherios Venizelos was a "staunch champion of the Armenians" and constantly kept their delegation apprised of developments.

Armenian relations with Azerbaijan were strained by overlapping territorial claims coupled with ethnic cleansing conducted by both sides. Throughout August 1919, Armenian militias were exacting "retribution from the most vulnerable Muslim settlements", sacking large Muslim villages, and according to Azerbaijani diplomats, massacring the men of six villages and destroying "300 Muslim villages ... since the beginning of 1918". Conversely, 25,000–40,000 Armenians in eastern and north-central Azerbaijan (Note: Namely, the Zakatal, Geokchay, Shemakha, Nukha, and Aresh districts.) were massacred by the Azerbaijani–Ottoman advance in 1918, forcing the survivors to gather in the three remaining Armenian villages (of 51 originally); further, thousands of Armenian women and girls were abducted during the advance, in an extension of the Armenian genocide. in Baku, Ottoman–Azerbaijani forces slew some 15,000 Armenians in the September Days massacre, in retribution for the March Days massacre of thousands of Azerbaijanis. Despite these atrocities, a peace agreement was signed in Tiflis under the auspices of Georgia and the United States in order to end the Azerbaijani campaign against Zangezur. In the areas claimed by Armenia and disputed with Azerbaijan and Georgia, there were 410,000 Armenians, 460,000 Muslims, and 36,000 others, totalling 906,000.

Despite the initial difficulties in Armenia–Georgia relations, the two governments signed a transit treaty on 3 November 1919 which was "substantive and immediate in its economic implications". The half-million Armenians in Georgia were "resented" by the Georgians due to the former's "decades-long ... dominance in Tiflis". (Note: In 1914, Armenians formed 45 percent of the population of Tiflis, the administrative centre of the Caucasus and one of the centres of the Armenian national movement.) In the Georgian capital, the Armenians had suddenly become a "disadvantaged minority", most who were civil servants were dismissed, and refugees and families were evicted from the city. In discussions of a territorial settlement, the Armenian negotiators ultimately offered to drop their claim on the Akhalkalaki district (Note: The Armenian side acknowledged that the Armenian majority in Akhalkalaki was a result of the "exchange of populations between the Turkish and Russian empires after the war of 1828–1829".) in return for the entirety of the Lori neutral zone, however, Georgia was only willing to drop its claims on the districts of Olti (Note: Neither Armenia nor Georgia fully controlled the Olti okrug; the west of the district was controlled by the Kurdish chieftain Jafar Bey.) and southern Lori. (Note: Armenia had already gained controlled of southern Lori in October 1918 with Ottoman assent; their control was later confirmed by the ceasefire agreement that ended the Armeno-Georgian war in late-1918.)

During its independence, Armenia established diplomatic relations with 40 countries, most notably Japan. By 10 January 1920, the Volunteer Army was defeated in the North Caucasus region by the victorious Bolsheviks; in light of this, the League of Nations and the Supreme Allied Council formally recognised Georgia and Azerbaijan as de facto governments over the region. Armenia's recognition followed on 19 January; the recognition was used as a last-ditch effort to prevent the sovietisation of the South Caucasus.

=== February – July 1920 ===
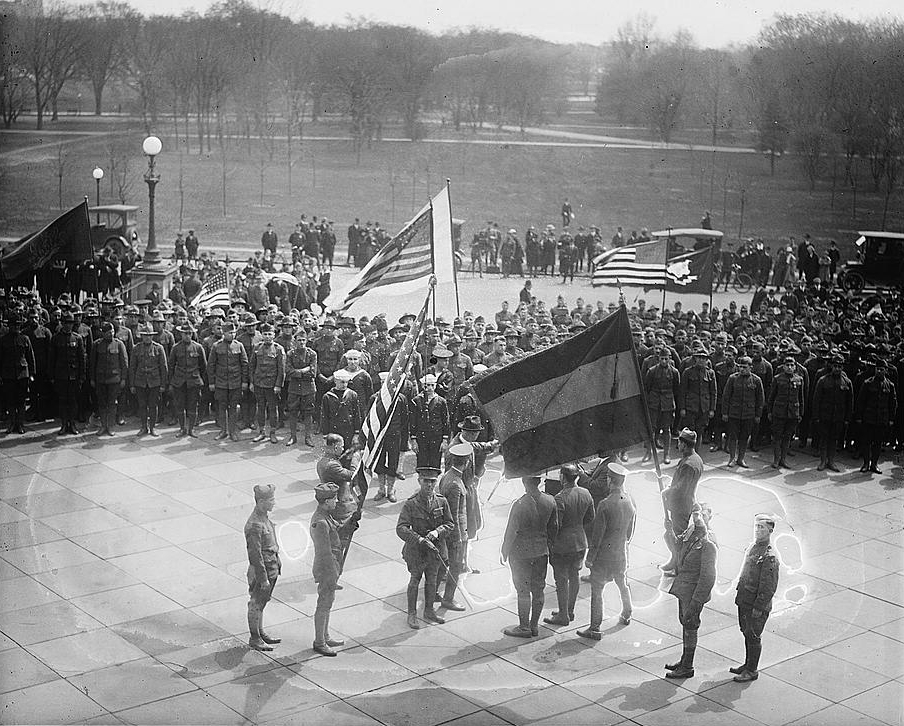
Armenian parade in April 14 with America

==== Karabakh rebellion ====
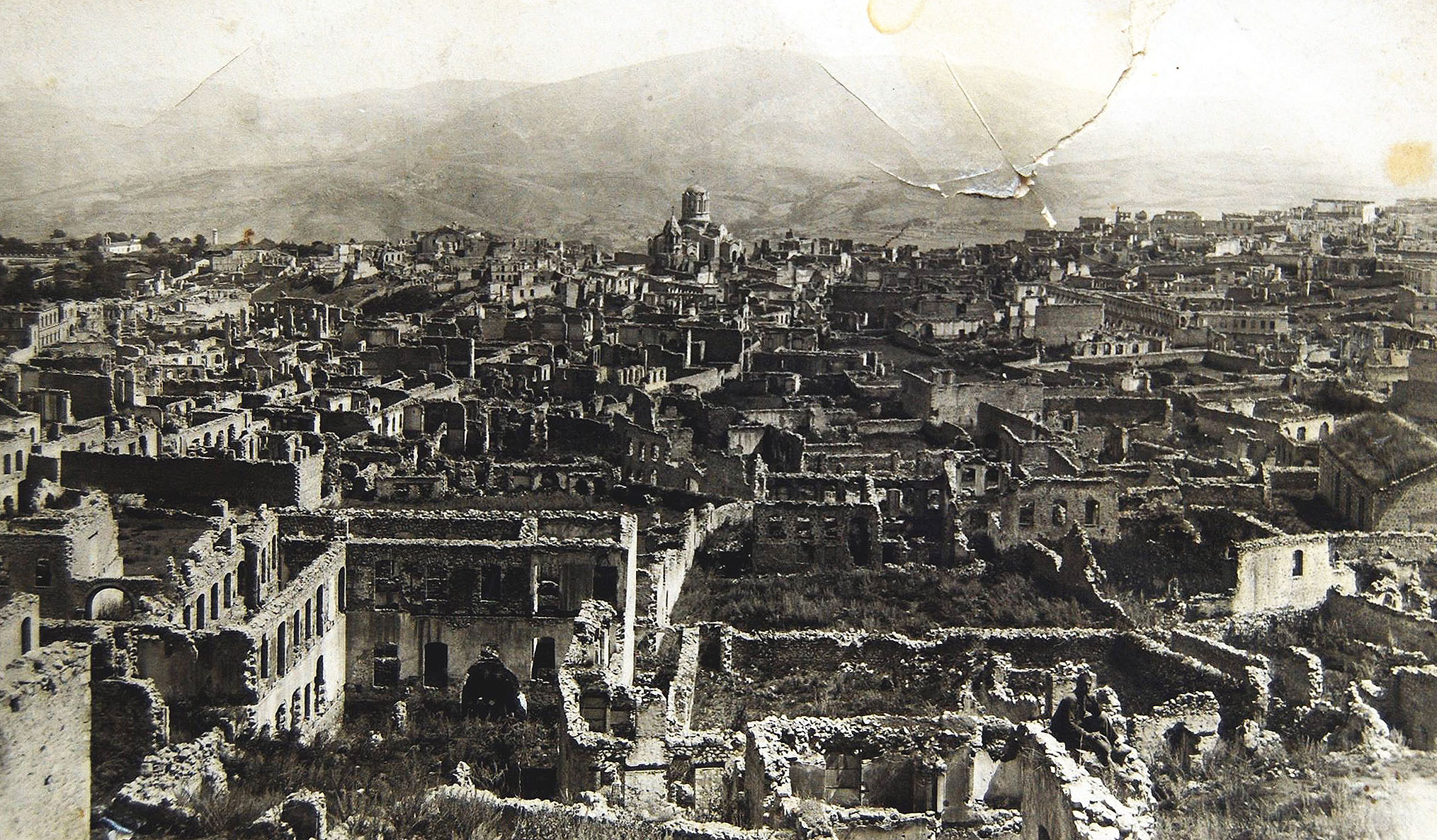
Shusha's Armenian quarter after its destruction by Azerbaijani forces in March 1920

As the Paris Peace Conference was inconclusive on the status of Nagorno-Karabakh, the governor-general, Khosrov bey Sultanov, dissolved the Armenians' autonomy and issued an ultimatum on 19 February 1920; thereby the Armenians of Nagorno-Karabakh were being coerced into permanently becoming part of Azerbaijan. The ultimatum was accepted by 45 Armenian representatives in Shusha, (Note: The capital of Nagorno-Karabakh.) but was rejected by representatives who had gathered in Shosh (Note: Shosh or Shushikend is a village a short distance from Shusha.) who "categorically rejected any possibility of union with Azerbaijan". Receiving news that Azerbaijan intended to "move against Zangezur" again on 25 March, agents from the Armenian republic organised an "abortive" rebellion in Karabakh that led to the massacre and displacement of Shusha's Armenian population. Even though the Armenian rebels failed to oust Azerbaijani garrisons in Khankend and Shusha, the countryside of Nagorno-Karabakh was under local control. The Azerbaijani army, despite the Red Army being stationed on its frontiers, moved towards Karabakh to put down the rebellion. As the Armenian army was dispatched by Armenia to assist the rebels, the Red Army put an end to the Azerbaijani republic through an unabated invasion. An ultimatum by the Red Army—which supplanted the Azerbaijani army following the latter's sovietisation—prompted the army's withdrawal from Nagorno-Karabakh. The region's Armenian inhabitants blamed the Armenian republic's agents and the Dashnaks for "dislocation and ruin" that came as a result of the uprising.

As a result of "Turkish–Azerbaijani aggression", Nagorno-Karabakh's population had declined by 20 percent in 1918–1920. Since 1920, Azerbaijani forces carried out massacres against Armenians in Khankend on 22 February 1920 leaving 400 dead, and Shusha from 22 to 26 March 1920 leaving 500 dead. By 11 April 1920, 30 villages in Nagorno-Karabakh had been "devastated" by Azerbaijani forces as a result of the uprising, leaving 25,000 homeless (including nearly 6,000 refugees from Shusha).

On 5 April 1920, to relieve pressure in Karabakh, Azerbaijani forces in Qazax initiated border clashes with Armenia. During the following two weeks, they occupied strategic heights and occupied and burned Armenian villages. On 9 April, a short-lived ceasefire was reached, however, it was broken by Azerbaijani forces occupied several other villages – this was justified through a note from the Azerbaijani government to Armenia, accusing it of attacking nine Azerbaijani settlements. On 18 April, officials from Dilijan and Qazax agreed on a ceasefire agreement that included the repatriation of all displaced residents and the restoration of the former boundary, thereby ending the clashes.

==== May Uprising ====
Encouraged by the Red Army invasion of Azerbaijan in late April 1920, the Armenian Bolsheviks headed by Avis Nurijanyan staged a revolt in May. The events preceding the revolt started on 1 May 1920, International Workers' Day, with the Bolsheviks demonstrating against the Dashnak government in various cities. The revolt escalated after the armoured train Vardan Zoravar (Վարդան Զորավար, 'General Vardan') and its crew under the command of Captain Sargis Musayelyan joined the Bolshevik rebels who had formed a revolutionary committee and proclaimed Armenia a Soviet state in Alexandropol on 10 May. The Bolshevik rebels also seized control in Kars and Sarıkamış. On 5 May 1920, Khatisian's cabinet resigned and a new one was formed under the leadership of Hamo Ohanjanyan, made up entirely of Dashnaks. The parliament then declared a state of emergency, appointing to commander a Western Armenian fedayee, Sebouh Nersesian, with the directive to suppress the uprising. On 13 May, Sebouh's unit reached Alexandropol; by the next day the rebels fled the city whilst government forces entered and established order.

The leaders of the revolt, including Sargis Musayelyan and Ghukas Ghukasyan, were initially imprisoned as the Soviet government on 4 June warned the Armenian government that diplomatic relations would be "detrimented" if the "persecution of Communists continued" and due to the fact that several notable Dashnaks were imprisoned in Russia and Azerbaijan at the time. Moreover, Armenia's domestic situation deteriorated as the government lost its prestige. In Soviet historiography, the uprising was "extensively glorified and sharply criticized", the latter due to its poor organisation and irresolution—critics agreed that "Bolshevism in Armenia existed only in the heads of intellectuals".

==== Summer campaigns ====
On 18 June 1920, Armenia issued an ultimatum to the Muslim insurgents in the outskirts, some 15 kilometres (9.3 miles) of Yerevan, to submit to Armenian rule. Having no expectation that the ultimatum would be answered, the Armenian army launched an offensive to recapture the rebelling villages on the following day; the Armenians were victorious on 21 June and had secured the peripheries of Yerevan, leading the Azerbaijani population to flee to Aralık in the nearby Surmalu uezd to avoid retribution.

Occurring simultaneously with the Armenian counteroffensive against insurgents near Yerevan, an attempt was made to seize the coal reserves in Penek. Armenian policy towards integration of Muslim areas was split between peaceful civilian incorporation with local autonomy and military invasion and threats, ultimately, the latter policy prevailed in the case of Penek. Armenian and Turkish reports confirmed the presence of Turkish soldiers operating in the district; in spite of this, the Armenian offensive to capture the western half of the Olti district began on 19 June 1920. By 22 June, the Armenian army had converged on Penek and ousted its Turko-Kurdish defenders, setting the new Armenian–Turkish frontier at the Oltu river.

The voices of the militaristic factions in the Armenian government were strengthened by the successes in Zangibasar and Penek, therefore, the army prepared to retake the districts of Vedibasar and Nakhchivan; the advance into the former began on 11 July and by the next day, Armenian forces had recaptured the district and Boyuk Vedi, reaching the boundary of the Erivan and Sharur-Daralayaz districts at the mountain pass known as the "Wolf's Gates"—this again caused the local Muslims to flee, now southward to Sharur. On 14 July, the Armenian advance continued through the Wolf's Gates into the Sharur district, capturing it two days later whilst the locals fled across the Aras river into Iran. Before the Armenians could advance into the Nakhichevan uezd proper, the national council (Azerbaijani: milli şura) of Nakhchivan appealed for peace, however, the negotiations only served in delaying Armenia's advance, after which the town of Şahtaxtı some 40 kilometres (25 miles) northwest of Nakhchivan was captured. By this time, the 11th Army of Soviet Russia (which had previously sovietised Azerbaijan) reached southern Nakhchivan to form a link with Kemalist Turkey — through this link, Russia hoped to bolster its supply of weapons and ammunition to Turkey. Colonel Tarkhov, the commander of the "united troops of the Soviet Russia and Red Turkey in Nakhichevan" addressed the Armenian army in Şahtaxtı, proclaiming Soviet rule over the rest of Nakhchivan, thereby ending the Armenian campaign.

=== August – December 1920 ===
==== Recognition ====
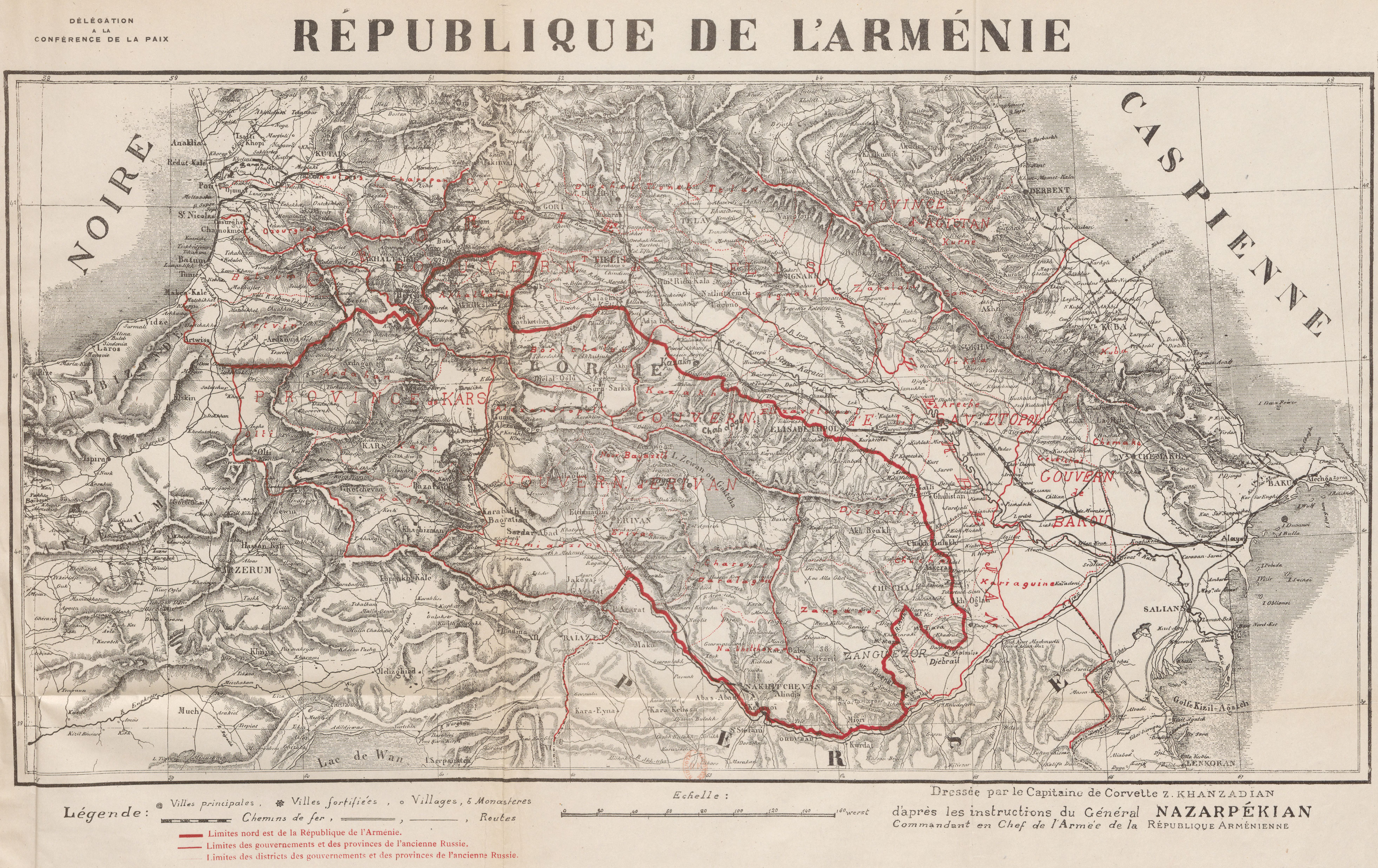
Map presented by the government of the Republic of Armenia shown at the Paris Peace Conference

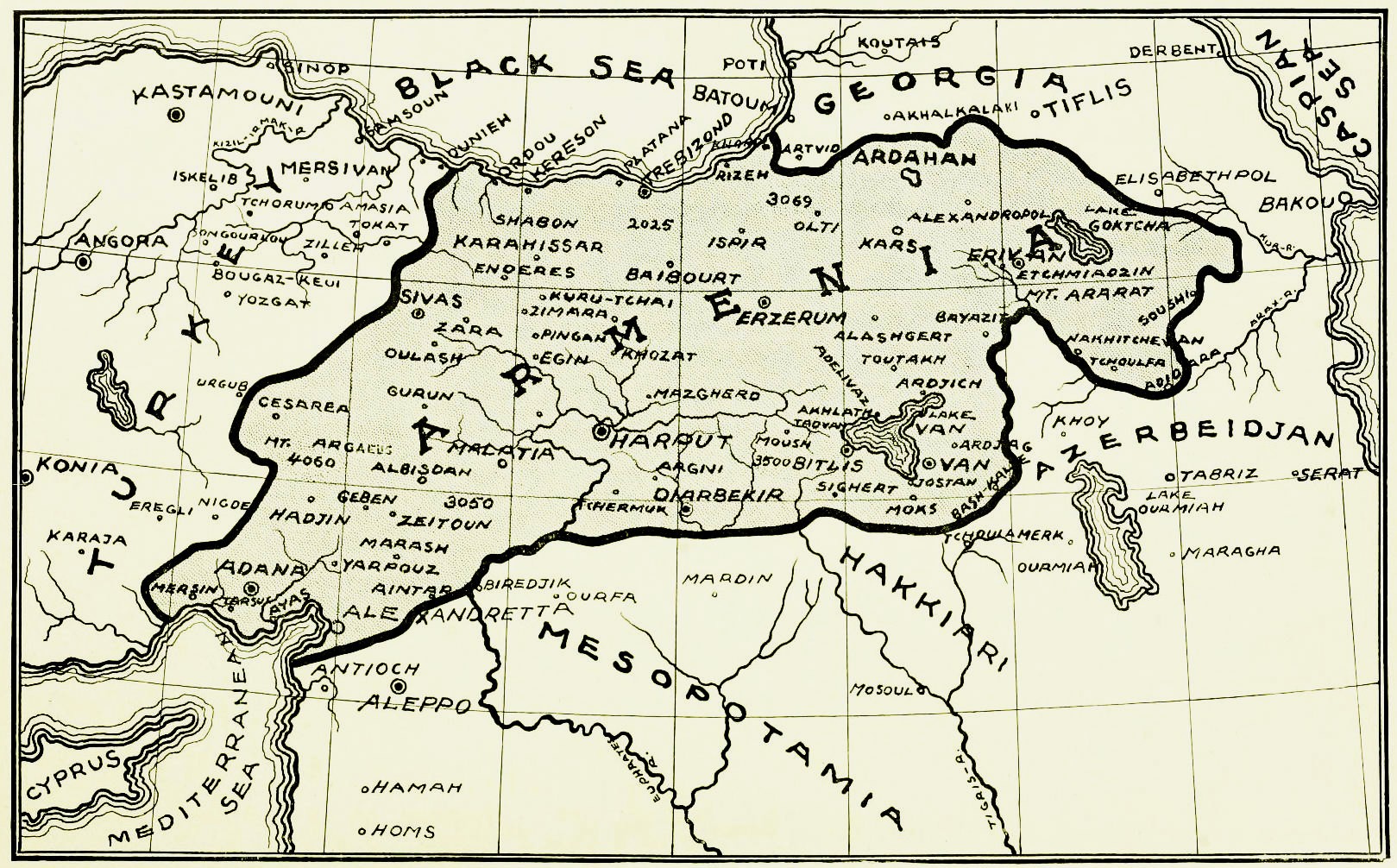
Map presented by the Armenian National Council shown at the Paris Peace Conference

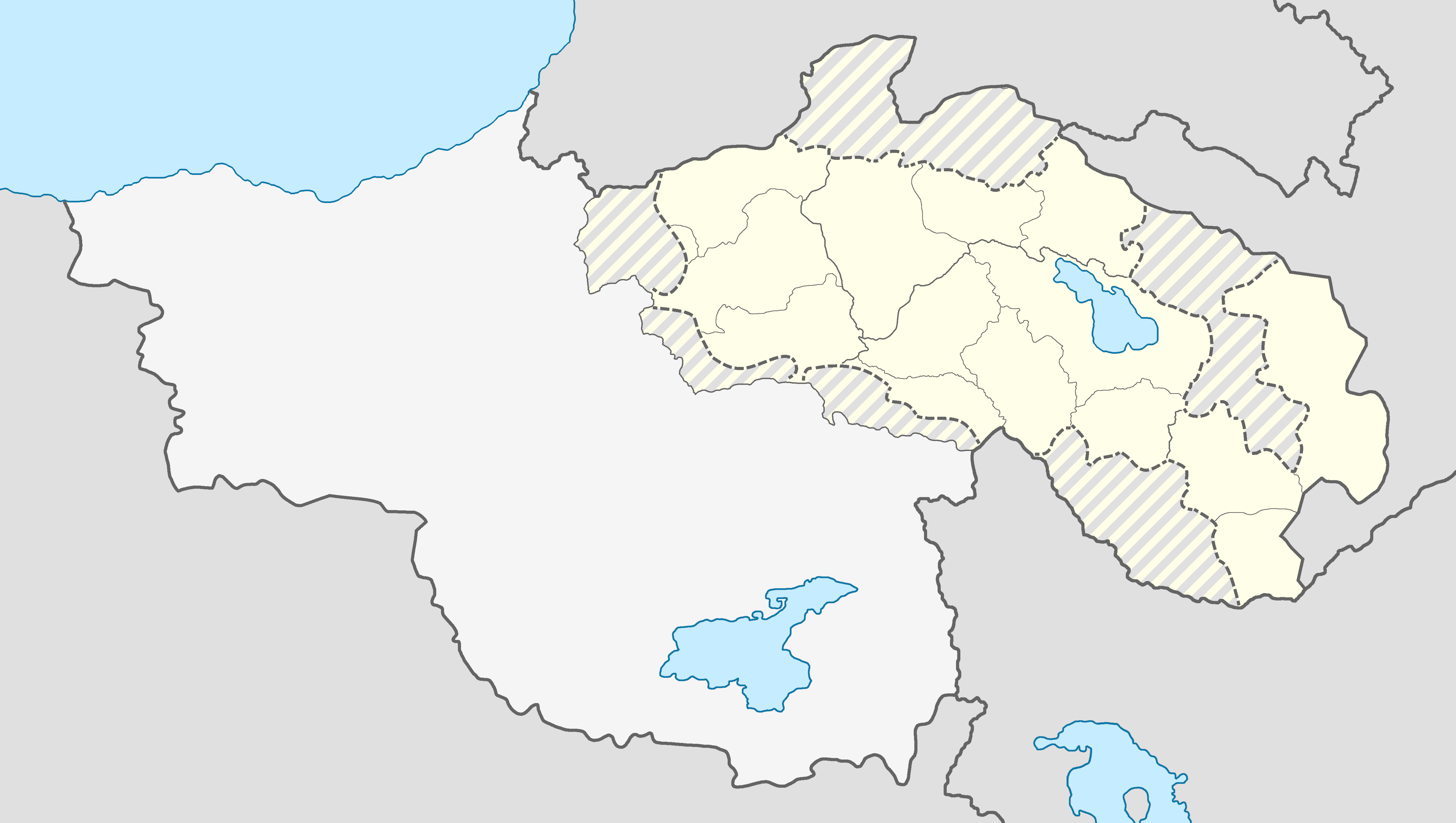
Administrative-territorial division of Armenia with territories received from Treaty of Sèvres

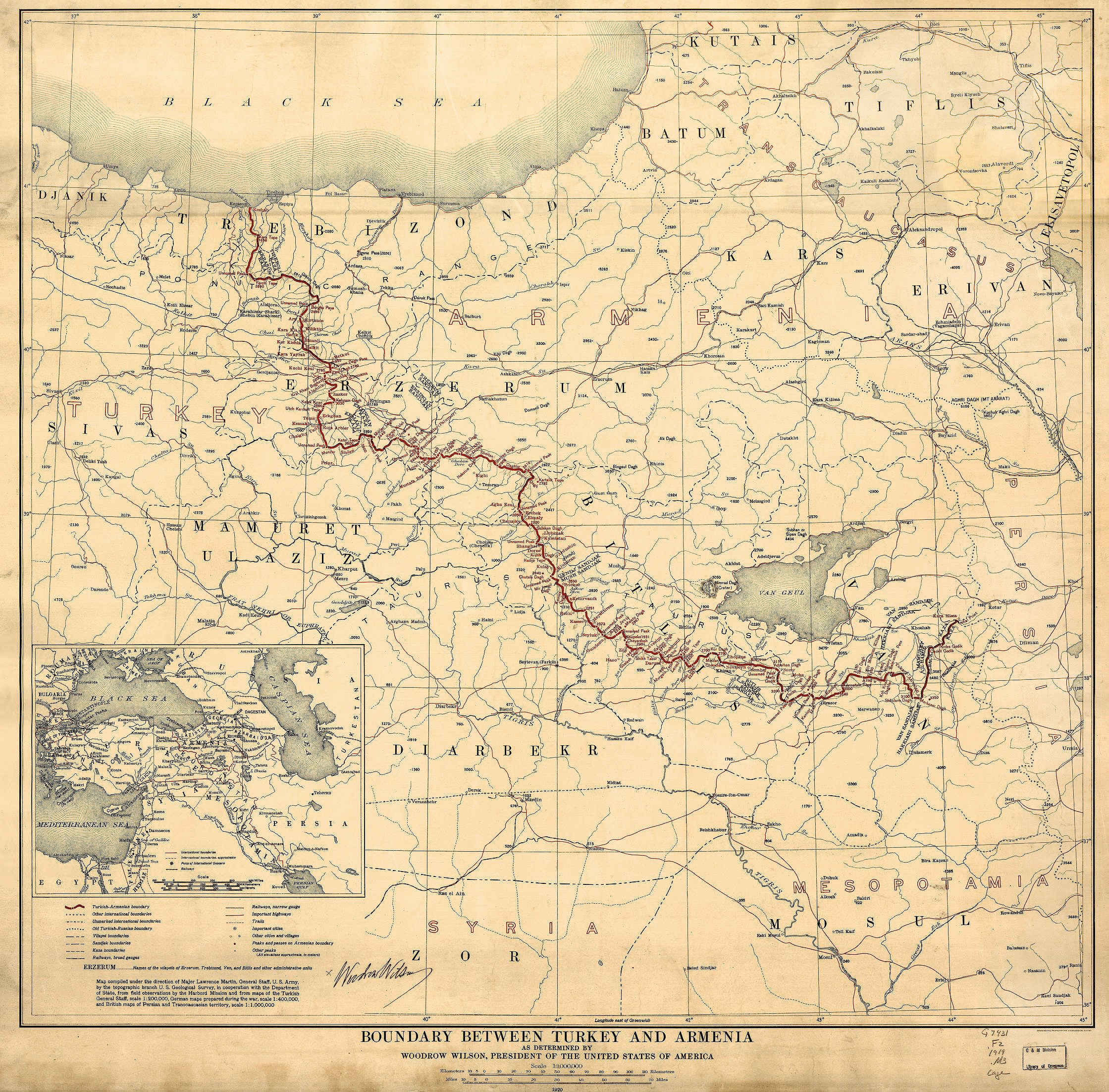
The Turkish-Armenian border by the Treaty of Sèvres

As no country was willing to assume the mandate over Armenia, the peace conference decided to only assign it the vilayets of Erzurum, Van, Bitlis, and Trebizond, with the precise boundary to be arbitrated by American president Woodrow Wilson. Although the Pontic Greeks were unhappy with the decision to assign Pontus to Armenia, "Greek and Armenian officials were confident that the issue could be resolved through adequate guarantees for an autonomous administration in the Pontus". On 10 August 1920, Armenian representatives in Paris signed the Treaty of Sèvres, thereby granting it de jure recognition and assigning it 103,599 square kilometres (40,000 square miles), thus expanding Armenia's borders to "60,000 square miles or 155,000 square kilometers, roughly equivalent to the country of Czecho-Slovakia or the state of Illinois". During the League of Nations's discussions regarding Armenia's application to join the organisation, it was stated that "Wilson's award might expand the territory from the existing 70,551 square kilometers, or 26,305 (actually 27,232) square miles, to as much as 214,000 square kilometers, or 80,000 (actually 82,604) square miles". According to Hewsen and Walker, the Ottoman territory awarded to Armenian totalled 16,216 square miles (42,000 square kilometres). According to reporter Tatul Hakobyan, a total of 87,000 square kilometres (34,000 square miles) were awarded. For the Armenia–Azerbaijan–Georgia territorial disputes, Article 92 of the treaty provided for the arbitration of frontiers by the "Principal Allied Powers" if the states couldn't determine it themselves through "direct agreement" by the time of the delineation of Armenia's western frontier.

On 10 August 1920, the same day that Armenia signed the Treaty of Sèvres which set their western frontier, a treaty with Soviet Russia was signed which set their "preliminary" eastern frontier; the agreement provided for an end to Soviet–Armenian clashes in Zangezur and Qazax, for Armenia to "occupy" the Şahtaxtı–Xok–Aznabyurt–Bardzruni–Kükü–Gorayk line and in Qazax, "the line they held on 30 July" of 1920. The treaty also recognised Karabakh, Nakhchivan, and Zangezur as disputed districts that Russia was to occupy without prejudicing the permanent border settlement. Armenia, in reaction to the "furor" among Allied circles caused by the treaty, stated that "In view of the extraordinary pressure exerted from all sides and the fact that the Armenian army was alone and heavily outnumbered, the government had accepted the temporary arrangement in order to win some time. Armenia would nonetheless maintain its firm anti-Bolshevik policies".

==== Turkish invasion ====
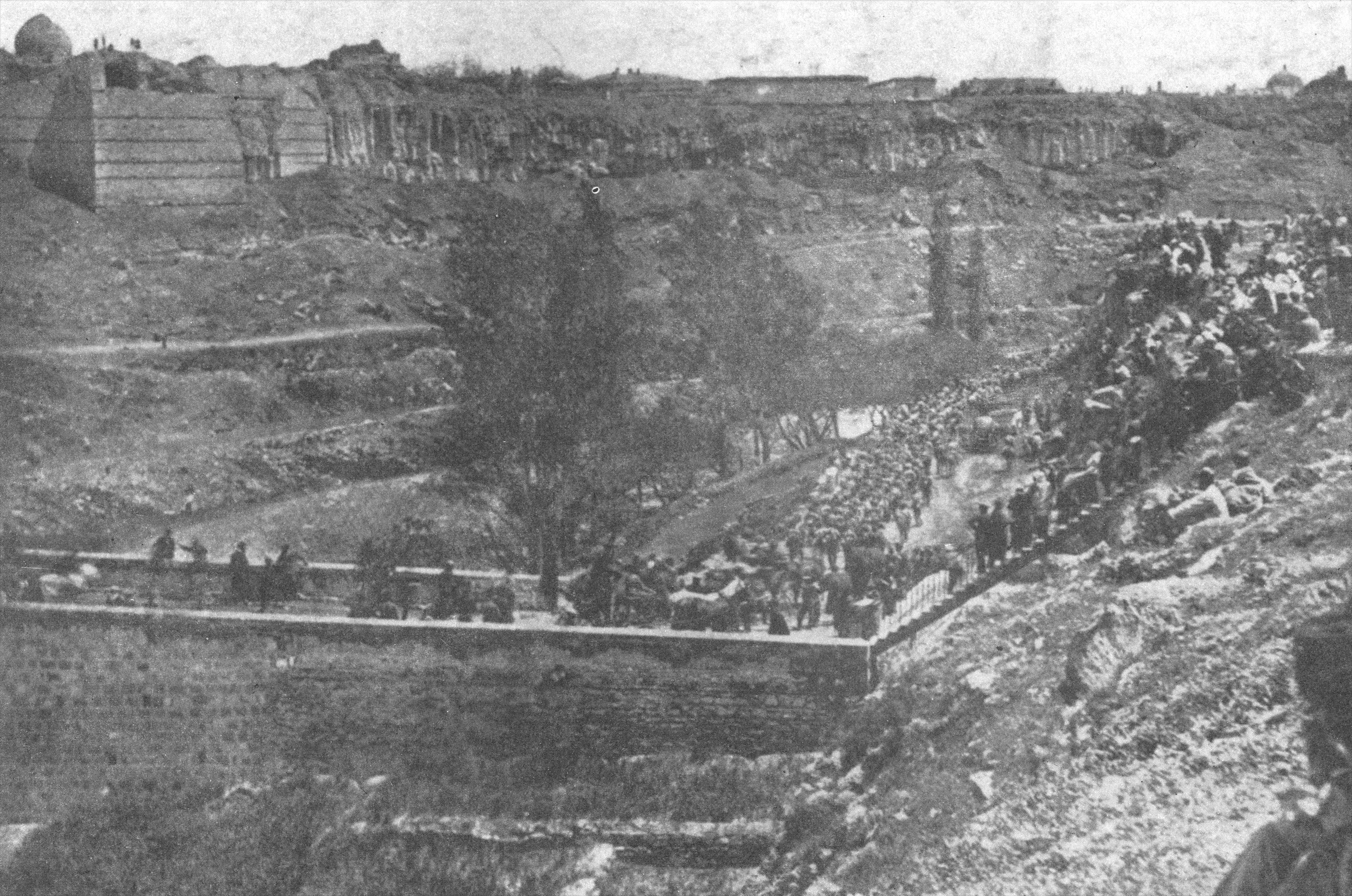
Araratian regiment going to the Turkish–Armenian front, 1920

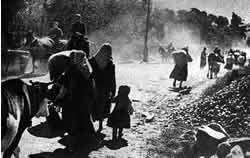
Armenian civilians flee Kars after its capture by Turkish forces

After the provisional Ottoman government failed to win support for ratification of the Treaty of Sèvres, remnants of the Ottoman Army's XV Corps under the command of Kâzım Karabekir, who had orders from the Ankara Government to "eliminate Armenia physically and politically", invaded Armenia on 28 September 1920. After unsuccessful Turkish manoeuvres in Sarıkamış, Armenian military command, not believing its 2.5 thousand and 1.5 thousand man garrisons in Sarıkamış and Olti-Merdenek, respectively, were enough to hold those positions, evacuated the former, falling back to Selim where they believed the Turks would strike. Accompanying the civilian population, Armenian forces retreated eastwards to more defensible positions. After Karabekir announced his successes to Kemal, the latter ordered a temporary halt to the invasion, fearful of Allied or Russian intervention.

The Turkish victory had indicated that "the Armenians had underestimated the Turkish resistance movement and overestimated their own strength and potential". On 30 September, Armenia mobilised men up to 35-years-old. The Turkish attacks on Merdenek, Sarıkamış, and Kağızman displaced some 50 thousand Armenians. According to American High Commissioner Mark Bristol, "the Armenians had started the trouble by moving into Olti in the summer". Though the Georgian press had denounced the Turkish invasion, Georgia was averse to "tie its fate with that of the beleaguered Armenians". Turkish envoys assured the Georgian government that Turkey would present no threat to them, and wouldn't object to Georgia occupying "certain territories in contention with Armenia". Georgia had already attempted to assert its authority in Armenian-held Ardahan, though with limited success.

During the war, the Armenian army fielded 40 thousand men, including 33 generals, more than 2 thousand officers, and 66 colonels. However, the army's structure was "top-heavy with a large, conservative officer corps accustomed to classical battle strategies". On 14 October, the Turkish army resumed its offensive, reaching the Merdenek-Selim-Kağızman line. On 27 October, Karabekir attacked towards Kars, flanking the Armenians. On 24 October, a concerted Turkish attack began on Surmalu, however, Dro's forces repelled the attack 2 days later. By 29 October, Kars was surrounded on three sides, however, was well armed and prepared to withstand an assault. The military council of Kars prohibited the 40 thousand inhabitants of the city from evacuating "not to undermine troop morale or give cause for panic". On 30 October, the Turkish army occupied the city of Kars, "which was supposed to be impregnable", "it was to be the last day the Armenian flag would fly over the citadel of Kars". According to a French source, "fatigue, starvation, lack of clothing and equipment" disorganised the 25 thousand men defending Kars, enabling its capture by 12 thousand Turks. The fall of Kars led to the capture of thousands of officers, 2 thousand of whom were taken to Erzurum for forced labour and internment. There were 1,500 Armenian casualties after the attack, of whom 500 were killed. Another source writes that 6,000 Armenians were massacred by the Turks following the capture of Kars.

In the span of two months, Armenia "lay prostrate in defeat"; Karabekir imposed on Armenia the Treaty of Alexandropol on 3 December 1920, whereby the latter denounced the Treaty of Sèvres and was confined to the province of Yerevan, thereby ceding Kars, Nakhchivan, and Surmalu. The other terms of the treaty effectively made Armenia a Turkish puppet state. However, the treaty was later declared null by the new authorities in Yerevan who had sovietised the country the previous day.

"In consequence of Turkish, and, presumably, Communist, massacres", 200 thousand Armenians were massacred. Another estimate places the number of Armenians massacred by the Turkish army during the war at 100 thousand. Turkish–German historian Taner Akçam mentions a 1961 Soviet encyclopedia that places the death toll at 198 thousand. An estimate by historian Christopher J. Walker places the number of Armenians massacred between 1919 and 1922 at "probably" 250 thousand. According to Soviet historian Zaven Korkotyan, the territory of present-day Armenia had a population of 961,677 in 1919, indicating that Armenia lost 241,677 or 25 percent of its population from 1919 to its sovietisation in late 1920.

==== Sovietisation ====
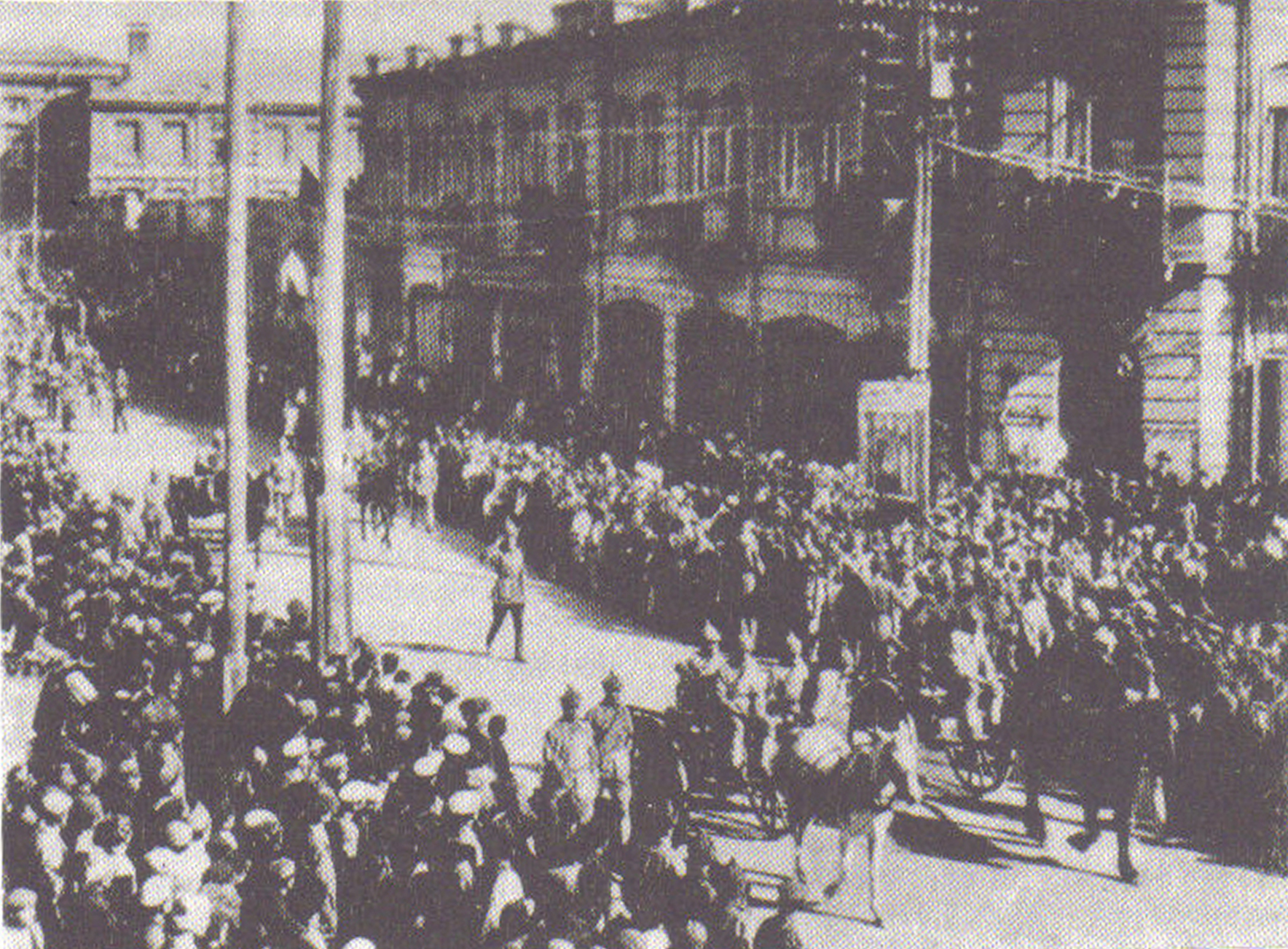
The Soviet 11th Red Army marching down Yerevan's Abovyan Boulevard, effectively ending Armenian self-rule

With Sergo Ordzhonikidze's approval, Revkom units advanced into Armenia from Qazax on the night of 28–29 November 1920. On 29 November, the Revkom issued its declaration, proclaiming Soviet rule in Armenia—the declaration began as follows:

By the will and desire of the insurgent labouring people of Armenia, the Armenian Communist Party declares Armenia from this day a Socialist Soviet Republic. Henceforth, Soviet Armenia's Red Flag will protect the working people from the centuries-long yoke of the oppressors

According to Hovannisian, the declaration "emphasized the beginning of a new era in relations with Azerbaijan and Turkey ... The establishment of Soviet order in Armenia would lead to the elimination of all disputed questions and the end of bloodshed among the Armenian and Azerbaijani workers and peasants". On 30 November, Azerbaijani revolutionary Nariman Narimanov issued a decree stating that "Mountainous Karabagh, Zangezur, and Nakhichevan have to be considered a part of the Armenian Socialist Republic"—this cession was done "because boundaries had no meaning among the family of Soviet peoples".

On 2 December 1920, due to the threat of a Soviet ultimatum to the Armenian government, the transfer of power was arranged at 6 o'clock in the evening, whereby, Armenia would be "proclaimed an independent socialist soviet republic ... the entire administrative order in Armenia" would pass to the Revkom, "members of the party Dashnaktsutiun and of other socialist parties in Armenia will not be subjected to any repression for their belonging to these parties", and "the Government of Soviet Russia will take immediate measures to concentrate the military forces needed to defend the independence" of Armenia.

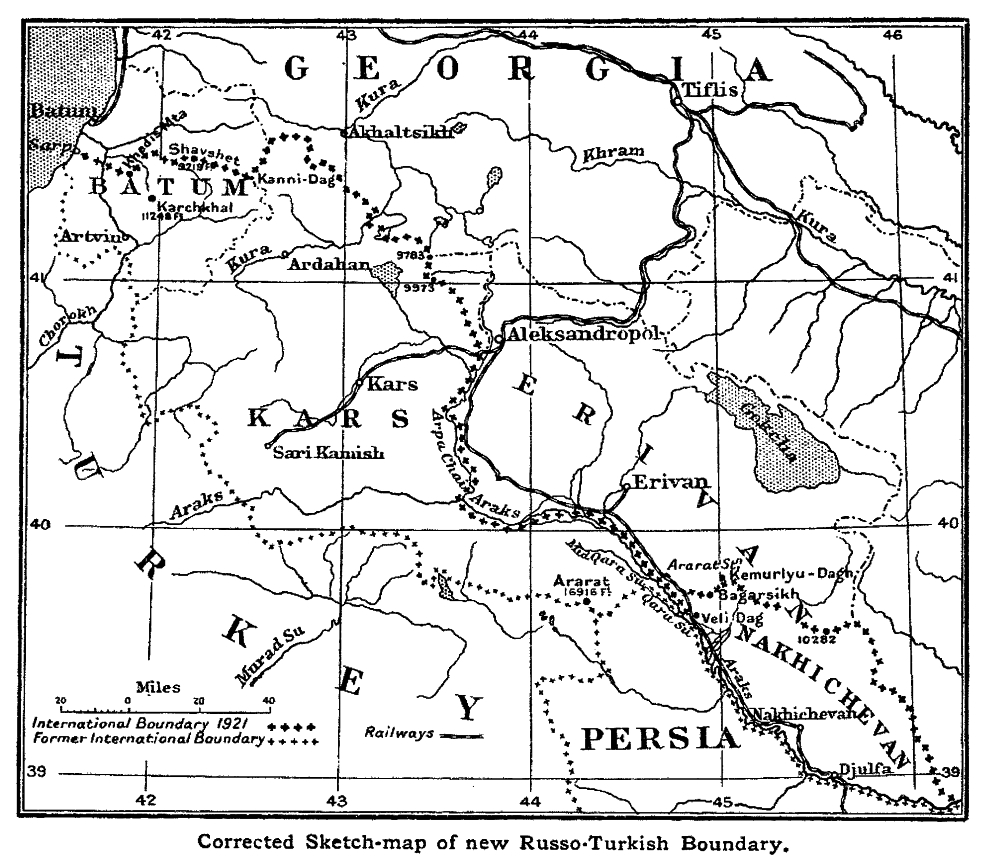
Soviet-Turkish border, by Treaty of Kars

As the Treaty of Alexandropol had been signed after the establishment of Soviet rule in Armenia and hadn't been ratified, the Revkom "quickly repudiated" it. In January 1921, in violation of the terms of the sovietisation, "much of the officer corps" were sent into exile in Russia. On 28 February, whilst the Red army incited a revolt in Georgia, anti-Soviet insurgents led by the erstwhile prime minister Simon Vratsian gained control of the countryside of Yerevan, forcing the Red Army to retreat. Vratsian made appeals to the West and Turkey, calling the latter to honour its commitment in the Treaty of Alexandropol to come to Armenia's aid, however, all were unanswered; after conquering Georgia, the Red army turned its attention to the revolt. On 2 April, "thousands of fighters and civilians" moved towards Zangezur for a final stand. Alexander Miasnikian, the head of the Armenian Revkom offered amnesty and assurances regarding the retention of Zangezur to Mountainous Armenia—on 16 July 1921, the rebels folded, retreating over the Aras river into Iran. If Armenia had held onto Kars, similarly to Georgia had held Batumi, it "might have been incorporated into Soviet Armenia". According to Vratsian, Armenia had been caught between "the Bolshevik hammer and the Turkish anvil".

== Greek–Armenian negotiations over Pontus ==
=== Background and early negotiations (May 1919–January 1920) ===
Armenian claims to Trabzon collided against Pontic Greek demands for an autonomous or independent Pontus. At the Paris Peace Conference Metropolitan Chrysanthos of Trebizond tried to work out some form of cooperation with the Armenian delegation. Eleftherios Venizelos sought to absorb an autonomous Pontus into a larger Armenia. The Armenians acknowledged that the Vilayet of Trebizond had been the seat of the Kingdom of Pontus and that its Greek population was certainly predominant over the Armenian one, but they argued that Trebizond's port was crucial as an outlet to the Black Sea for the Armenian plateau. Greek opinion mostly ran toward an independent Pontus or some kind of confederation with Armenia, while Armenians preferred a unitary Armenian state with autonomy granted to the Pontic Greeks. Nevertheless, both Greek and Armenian officials were united in believing that the issue could be resolved by adequate guarantees for an autonomous administration in Pontus.

Chrysanthos took the case for an independent Pontus under Allied mandate to the Paris Peace Conference. He met Woodrow Wilson on 16 May 1919 after clearing the approach with Venizelos, and raised the possibility of an American mandate, or, alternatively, a Greek one, gaining Wilson's support. French delegate André Tardieu backed the plan as well, while Clemenceau told Greek diplomat Athos Romanos that he would support the Pontic Greeks, if Wilson did the same. Despite this, the Greek delegation kept looking for a compromise with Armenia.

In December 1919 Chrysanthos and Greek diplomat Ioannis Stavridakis went to Tiflis and Yerevan to negotiate. The Pontic delegation proposed a federation of two separate autonomous entities. Armenian Prime Minister Alexander Khatisian proposed Pontus to enter Armenia, but with autonomy and its own parliament, keeping the Armenian state formally unitary. Customs, postal and telegraph services, and other shared institutions were also discussed. The talks continued in Yerevan from 10 to 16 January 1920. Khatisian sent Chrysanthos a confidential letter on the 10th and another from Tiflis on the 16th, and on that day the two men jointly appealed to Venizelos and to the Armenian and Pontic delegations at the conference. Chrysanthos told Venizelos afterward that the Armenian government considered the final settlement dependent on the Armenian delegation's position in Paris. By then, both sides were pushing a Greek landing at Trabzon.

The two sides agreed in principle to a Pontic Greek-Armenian confederation, while leaving the precise degree of federalisation open. The agreement provided that each constituent state would keep its own parliament, laws, ministries and regular army, while military forces would fall under a common commander and war ministry. In addition, foreign policy, commerce, industry, customs, currency, and postal and telegraph services would be handled jointly, while religion, education and the gendarmerie stayed with each state. Pontus's portion of the federation was to include the Trabzon Vilayet, covering Samsun, Amasya, Sinop and Karahisar. A military agreement accompanied the political one, with Greek and Armenian forces agreeing to cooperate against anyone threatening the arrangement. Greek troops under Dimitrios Katheniotis would land at Trabzon and push toward Erzurum as the Armenian army advanced on it from the other side.

=== Breakdown (February 1920–May 1920) ===
In February, the Entente refused to cede Trabzon to Armenia, believing it to be "politically and ethnographically problematic". Katheniotis went to London hoping for British backing for a Republic of Pontus under Greek mandate, but found none. The San Remo Conference refused Trabzon to Armenia again in April, and, afterwards, Chrysanthos and other Pontic representatives proposed an autonomous Pontus within Turkey, governed by someone appointed by the League of Nations, as a last resort.

In May, Venizelos told the Greek parliament that an independent Pontus could not be realized. He recalled that his earlier idea was a League of Nations mandate for Armenia and Pontus leading into a federation, and blamed its failure partly on the populations involved rejecting it and partly on the Pontic representatives' own failure to negotiate properly with Armenia.

=== Revival, later negotiations and Republic of Pontus (June–October 1920) ===
The subject was revived in June. Venizelos told Greek diplomat Nikolaos Politis on 15 June that if Greece had to enforce the peace settlement by force, he hoped that its terms could be revised to allow for a federation between Pontus and Armenia. British Prime Minister David Lloyd George then invited Venizelos to London and put Greece in charge of enforcing the Allied settlement against the Ankara government. The successful Greek Summer Offensive that followed encouraged the Pontic representatives to take up the campaign for independence again.

The Athens Pontus Committee sent Venizelos a memorandum on 7 July offering 20,000 men for an advance along the Samsun–Sivas road. Three days later, representatives Constantine Constantinides and Socrate Oeconomos told the French Foreign Ministry they were still seeking full independence, while promising good relations and assistance to Armenia. Venizelos told his deputy Emmanouil Repoulis on 29 July that Greece would keep any territory occupied beyond the treaty's terms for as long as Turkey threatened Armenia, and, days later, assured Constantinides that if Turkey failed to implement the treaty, Greece would occupy Pontus with three or four divisions.

The Treaty of Sèvres was signed on 10 August. Under Article 89, the frontier between Turkey and Armenia in the provinces of Erzurum, Trabzon, Van and Bitlis was to be determined by arbitration. The next day, on 11 August, Venizelos got Armenia to formally drop its claim to Trabzon, in return for a Greek commitment to keep fighting in western Anatolia and hold occupied territory as long as Armenia remained under threat. On 17 August, Aharonian told the Greek government that Armenia wanted to send an ambassador to Athens. Athens planned to reciprocate in Yerevan.

Pontic Greek lobbyists in the United States appealed to Wilson on 21 September, this time asking for Trabzon's union with Greece rather than an independent Pontus. The Turkish invasion of Armenia began three days later, on 24 September, and Armenia appealed to the Allies for a Greek occupation of Trabzon. British diplomat Andrew Ryan and Admiral John de Robeck both supported it. On 5 October, Venizelos proposed a planned operation to David Lloyd George, in which the Greek Army destroy Turkish forces at Ankara and Trabzon, then establish a Republic of Pontus, which, together with the Democratic Republic of Georgia and the First Republic of Armenia, would serve as a barrier against both the Turkish National Movement and the Bolsheviks. The British Cabinet discussed the proposal on 12 October. Lloyd George agreed, but others feared French and Italian objections, so the cabinet put the matter off for later. Venizelos sent the plan's details to Greek diplomat Dimitrios Kaklamanos that same day. The plan was for Greek troops to push through to Ankara and move onto Pontus within a month.

=== Final collapse (November–December 1920) ===
The Turkish offensive of November 1920 coincided with the Soviet invasion and crushed the First Republic of Armenia, ending what remained of Pontic Greek-Armenian cooperation. Venizelos's defeat in that same month's elections in Greece finished off the idea of an independent Republic of Pontus alongside it. Under the Treaty of Alexandropol, signed 3 December, Armenia withdrew its claims to Ottoman territory. The Sovietization of Armenia that followed removed the Armenian government from the dispute entirely and neither the federation nor the republic was ever established.

== Demographics ==
=== Population ===
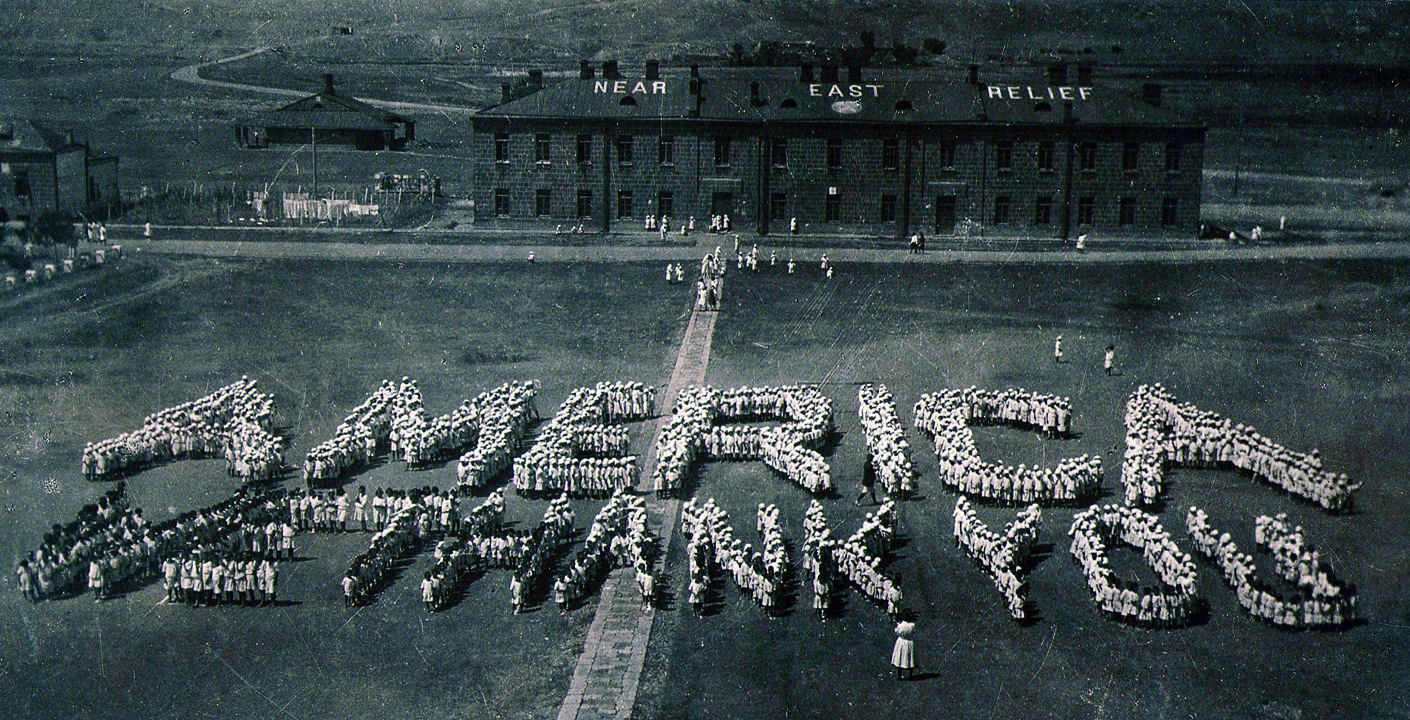
Armenian orphans of the Middle East in the American Orphanage in Alexandropol, displayed in the form of the phrase "America We Thank You"

In 1918, by virtue of the Treaty of Batum, Armenia was confined to a territory of 5,000 square miles (13,000 square kilometres) containing 679 thousand inhabitants, in addition to 600 thousand refugees. Although no census was taken in Armenia during its brief independence, its population in 1918 was reliably estimated to be 900 thousand—500 thousand were native Russian Armenians, 300 thousand were Ottoman Armenian refugees, and 100 thousand were Muslims (predominantly Azerbaijanis, Turks, and Kurds). According to historian George Bournoutian, the official figures for the ethnic composition of the Armenian republic in 1918 were the following: Armenians – 669,871; Tatars – 365,841; Turks – 8,000; Kurds – 36,508; Yazidis – 12,624; Russians, Georgians, Greeks, and Roma – 21,854.

In 1919, the projected population of Armenia in the 67,350 square kilometres (26,000 square miles) of territory it claimed was 2,158,351–2,160,000. By the time of its collapse, Armenia had a population of 1.5 million in the territory of most of present-day Armenia, the Kars and Iğdır provinces, and the Çıldır and Göle districts of the Ardahan Province of Turkey, and "disputed control" of Nakhchivan, Nagorno-Karabakh, Zangezur, Qazax, Oltu, and Lori. According to the 1922 publication of the Encyclopædia Britannica, Armenia in 1919 (consisting of parts of the Erivan and Kars provinces) had a population of 1.51 million. Further, there were almost 10,000 Russians living in Armenia, half of which were peasants resettled by the Tsarist government and the other half were officials or civil servants working mainly in the military, judiciary and communications. Both of these groups of Russians largely had a negative view of Armenian statehood, not believing that "yesterday's subject of the Russian had become the master in their country". Armenia also had a large number of Muslims, constituting 30% of its population, who constantly posed a threat to the republic due to their armed uprisings. According to Hovhannes Kajaznuni, "the Muslim population of Armenia, encouraged by Turkey and Azerbaijan, held an anti-Armenian position".

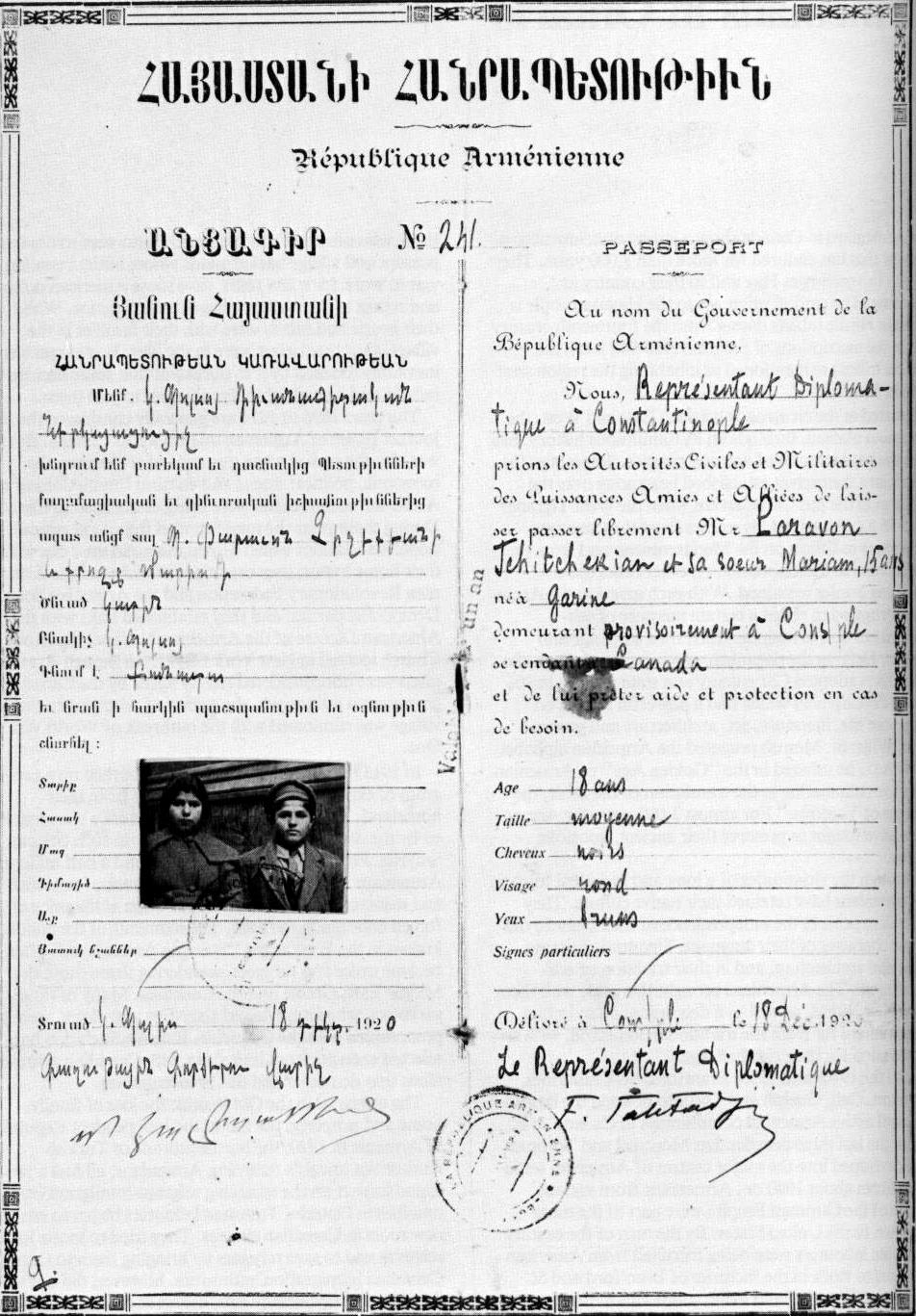
Passport of a citizen of the Republic of Armenia.

As a result of "wars and civil clashes, hunger and diseases" of 1918–1920, 432 thousand people or 36 percent of the population were "exterminated". By the time of Armenia's sovietisation, it had a population of 720 thousand, little more than 10 thousand of whom were Turks. Before the autumn of 1922, 60 thousand Turks were repatriated to Armenia—"no less than 200 thousand" Turks and Kurds had been driven from Armenia due to the Dashnaks' policy of "cleansing".

De jure religious composition
Religious group	Treaty of Batum		Claimed territory	
Religious group	Number	%	Number	%
Armenians	470,000	69.22	1,293,000	59.89
Muslims	168,000	24.74	670,000 (Note: Of these, 588,000 were "Tartar, Turk, Turkoman and Karapapak", and 82,000 were Kurd.)	31.03
Orthodox	41,000	6.04	123,000 (Note: Of these, 110,000 were "Russian and Greek", and 13,000 were Georgian.)	5.70
Others	41,000	6.04	73,000 (Note: These were "Yazide and Gypsy".)	3.38
TOTAL	679,000	100.00	2,159,000	100.00

De facto religious composition
Religious group	1918		1919	
Religious group	Number	%	Number	%
Armenians	800,000 (Note: 500 thousand were Russian Armenians and 300 thousand were Ottoman Armenian refugees.)	88.89	795,000	52.65
Muslims	100,000	11.11	575,000	38.08
Others			140,000	9.27
TOTAL	900,000	100.00	1,510,000	100.00

==== On the territory of present-day Armenia ====
According to Korkotyan, the 1919 "census" was "full of a thousand and one errors". The data recorded a population of 723,827 Armenians (including 162,044 immigrants), 127,748 Muslims (including 25,852 immigrants), 41,097 non-Muslims (including 7,482 immigrants), and 19,570 mixed population (including 5,830 immigrants), yielding a total population of 912,242; however, according to historian Grigor Grigoryan's calculations, the actual population was 917,297: 715,192 were Armenians, 122,185 were Muslims, 48,672 were non-Muslims, and 31,352 were mixed population. The distribution of population on the territory of present-day Armenia in 1919 was as follows:

District	Population
Abaran	41,859
Ashtarak	31,051
Talin	13,044
Ghamarlu	45,148
Vedi	10,000 (Note: Vedi was the only district to have "Tatar" as its main nationality in 1919; the other districts were all Armenian.)
Ghurdughulin	31,051
Vagharshapat	60,950
Basargechar	8,328
Martuni	37,621
Nor-Bayazet	32,555
Akhta	41,175
Kotayk	27,592
Allahverdi	33,378
Gharakilisa	60,760
Stepanavan	35,279
Alexandropol (urban)	51,000
Aghbaba	33,318
Artik	59,245
Alexandropol (rural)	68,555
Goris	30,610
Ghapan	19,552
Meghri	8,500
Sisian	31,286
Dilijan	30,795
Ijevan	29,514
Shamshadin	16,000
Pashalu	5,762
Keshishkend	19,749
Yerevan	48,000
TOTAL	961,677

=== Refugees ===
Distribution of Armenian refugees
District	December 1918	February 1919	November 1919	April 1920
Erevan (Yerevan)	75,000	31,700	67,000	62,590
Etchmiadzin (Vagharshapat)	70,000	42,600	52,000	43,762
Novo-Bayazit (Gavar)	38,000	27,923	8,610	6,610
Daralagiaz (Vayots Dzor)	36,000		10,000	6,082
Bash-Abaran (Aparan)	35,000			
Ashtarak	30,000	12,880		
Akhta (Hrazdan)–Elenovka (Sevan)	22,000	23,750		
Bash-Garni (Garni)	15,000			
Karakilisa (Vanadzor)	16,000	9,000	13,000	26,443
Dilijan	13,000	12,000	8,560	7,192
Zangezur	30,000	22,890		
Aleksandropol (Gyumri)		10,000	117,000	94,856
Kars			57,000	57,000
Igdir (Iğdır)				6,300
Unspecified		70,650		
TOTAL	380,000	263,393	333,170	310,835

== Government ==
In May 1920, the First Republic of Armenia was administratively divided into the following provinces (նահանգներ, nahangner):

- Ararat (Արարատ) – composed of the districts of Erivan, Surmalu, Etchmiadzin (without the Talin subdistrict), Sharur-Daralayaz, and Nakhichevan. Its governors in chronological order were Paruir Levonyan, Sahak Torosyan, and Levon Bek Amirkhanyan.
- Shirak (Շիրակ) – composed of the districts of Alexandropol, Talin, Dilijan, Akhalkalaki (controlled by Georgia), and the Aghbaba subdistrict of the Kars Oblast. Its governor was Garo Sassouni.
- Vanand (Վանանդ) – composed of the Kars Oblast (without the Aghbaba subdistrict and northern Ardahan). Its governor was Stepan Ghorghanyan.
- Syunik (Սյունիք) – composed of the highland districts of the Elizavetpol Governorate (without the Dilijan district), including Zangezur and Nagorno-Karabakh. Its governors in chronological order were Sergey Melik-Yolchyan and Zakar Yolyan.

=== Parties ===
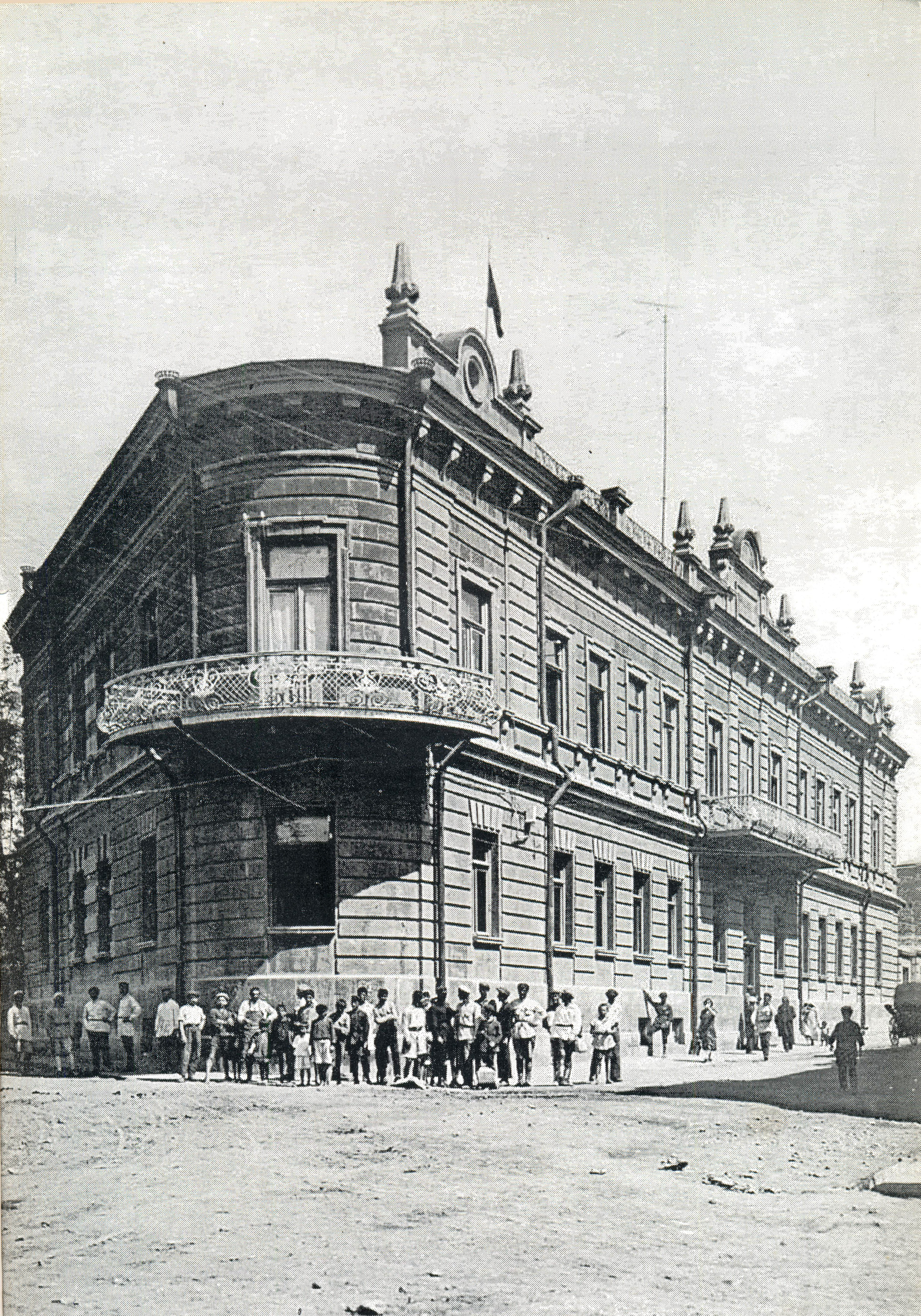
Government House of Republic of Armenia, 1918–1920

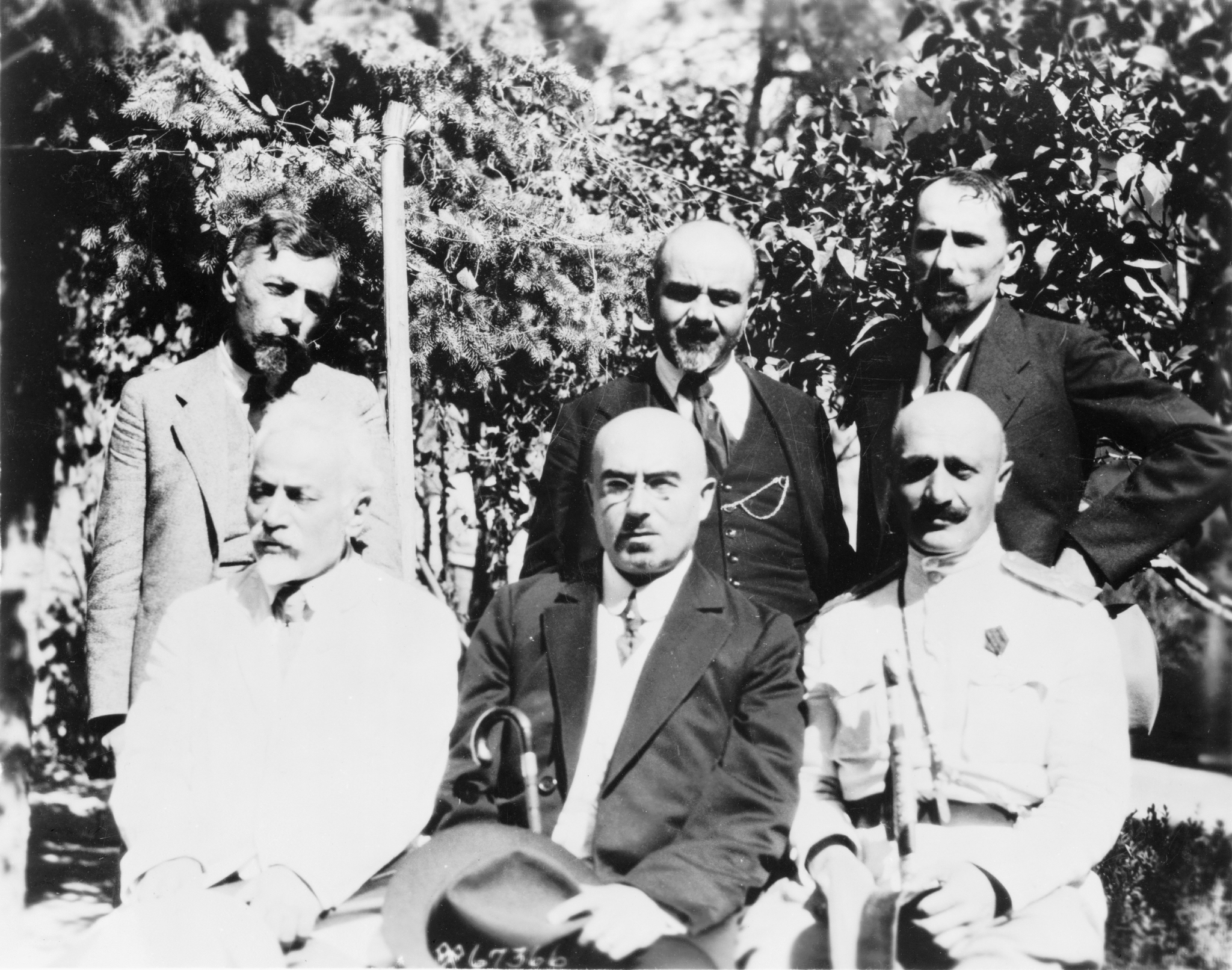
The cabinet of Armenia in October 1919.

The dominant party in Armenian politics was the Armenian Revolutionary Federation (or Dashnaks)—their monopoly in this sphere was confirmed through the 1919 Armenian parliamentary election. The Dashnaks held almost all posts in every cabinet of the Armenian republic, however, the organisation was not only "not a monolithic organization but had served as a broad umbrella in the cause of national emancipation", but also, was originally "created as a revolutionary society to emancipate the Turkish Armenians, it was neither structured as nor intended to evolve into a legal ruling organism". The party also suffered from "contradictions between nationalism and socialism" and "a widening rift between intellectuals and partisan chief"—despite these factors, the Dashnaks placed "great importance on showing a solid front".

The liberal Constitutional Democrats or Ramgavar opposed class-warfare in the face of suffering due to foreign oppression—the party had a "militant tradition" due to absorbing the Armenakan Party and a faction of the Reformed Hunchak Party. The Armenian Populist Party, formed in 1917 from the Russian Kadets were "purely bourgeois and antirevolutionary", and shared the posts of the second cabinet with the Dashnaks and "advanced a program of liberal, evolutionary reforms and drew its adherents primarily from among the professional-commercial classes of Tiflis and Baku".

Bolsheviks in Armenia boycotted the Armenian parliamentary elections, branding Armenian democracy "bourgeois parliamentarianism", thereby it was evident that "radicals" were in control of the Armenian branch. In the latter half of 1919, Bolsheviks expelled from Georgia gathered in Armenia; in all, there were some 500 Bolsheviks in Armenia with little coordination with one-another. Akin to their colleagues throughout the former Russian Empire, they opposed Armenia's independence and sought the country's reunion with Russia.

The Social Democrat Hunchakian Party was the only Marxist party that had significant Eastern and Western Armenian membership. However, following the events of World War I, Eastern Armenian Hunchaks became Mensheviks or Bolsheviks—by this time, the party in the Caucasus was held together by a "small circle of old loyalists and a few refugee members from Van". The Western Armenians "found repugnant the 'Russianism' of the Erevan republic and its native inhabitants", also believing that "the government and capital of liberated Armenia should be located in Karin (Erzerum), Van, or even a major center in Cilicia, but certainly not in Erevan".

Armenian Social Democrats were divided into 5 groups due to disagreements regarding the "tactics and interpretations of Marxism". The Social Democrats were further weakened by the Bolshevik–Menshevik split, by virtue of which they remained aligned with the Mensheviks. Internationalist Arshak Zohrabyan led the Armenian branch of the Menshevik Social Democrats, however, he was exiled from Tiflis after criticising the secessionist and nationalist principles of the Georgian Mensheviks and died in Yerevan from typhus weeks later—"Menshevism in Armenia evaporated with the death of its most eloquent and persuasive proponent". The Social Democrat branch known as the Specifists "maintained that unique historic and political factors affecting the Armenians justified a separate Armenian approach to socialism and a distinct national Marxist party within the international movement". In January 1920, they founded the "Social Democrat Labor Party of Armenia"; unlike the Bolsheviks and Mensheviks, the Specifists welcomed Armenian independence and strove for scientific socialism. Specifist Davit Ananun in ridiculing the Ramkavar's focus on Western Armenia believed that it "depended on the survival and strengthening" of the Eastern Armenian republic.

The Social Revolutionaries or SRs had similar socio-economic views to the ARF and were composed of many former-Dashnaks who had left the ARF due to its focus on the emancipation of Western Armenia. Before the Russian Revolution, the SRs "decried the chauvinism and racial strife" and called for a united front against the autocracy of the Tsar—despite their appeals, they "scarcely made a ripple in the Armenian provinces". Whilst sympathetic to Soviet Russia, the majority of SRs didn't recognise the legitimacy of the Sovnarkom, vowing to continue its opposition to the Dashnaks in a legal form—thereby they "became little more than an innocuous, perhaps even a useful, annoyance" to the Dashnaks.

=== Act of United Armenia ===
On 28 May 1919, on the first anniversary of the Republic of Armenia, the government of the newly founded country symbolically declared the union of Eastern and Western Armenia, the latter of which was still under the full control of the Turks. The declaration, read by Alexander Khatisian, is as follows:

To restore the integrality of Armenia and to secure the complete freedom and prosperity of her people, the Government of Armenia, abiding by the solid will and desire of the entire Armenian people, declares that from this day forward the divided parts of Armenia are everlastingly combined as an independent political entity.

... Now, in promulgating this act of unification and independence of the ancestral Armenian lands located in Transcaucasia and the Ottoman Empire, the Government of Armenia declares that the political system of United Armenia is a democratic republic and that it has become the Government of this United Republic of Armenia.

Thus, the people of Armenia are henceforth the supreme lord and master of their consolidated fatherland, and the Parliament and Government of Armenia stand as the supreme legislative and executive authority conjoining the free people of united Armenia.

=== Military ===
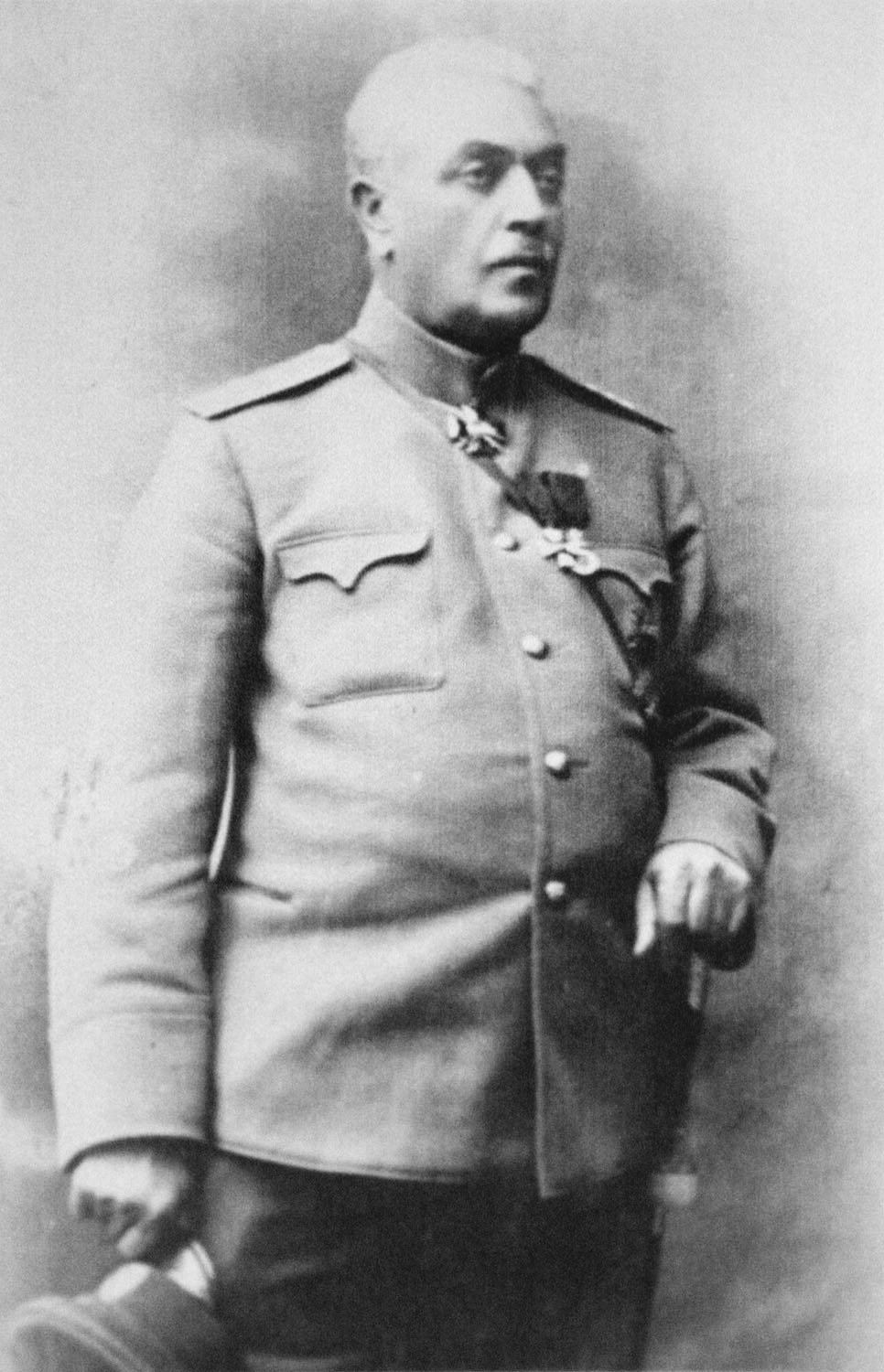
Tovmas Nazarbekian, first ever Chief of the General Staff of the Armed Forces of the First Republic of Armenia.

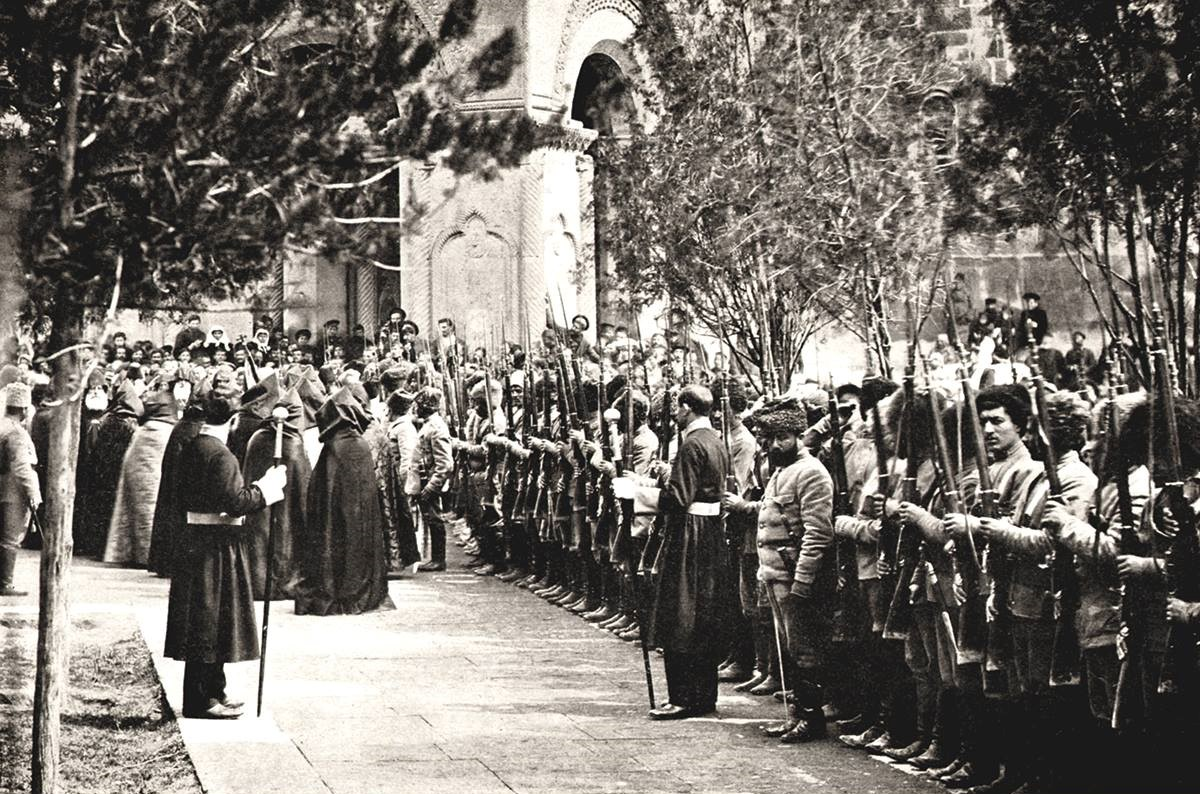
The Armenian army in 1918

Owing to the efforts of Armenian National Council of Tiflis, the Armenian National Corps was established to fight against the Ottoman offensive of late 1917 and early 1918. On 13 December 1917, the Armenian National Corps was established, with General Tovmas Nazarbekian was appointed commander and Drastamat Kanayan became the defence minister. Nazarbekian used his experience in the Russian Caucasus Army to aid in the creation of the regular army. Units of this corps formed the basis of the Armenian army. Armenian conscripts and volunteers from the Russian Army later established the core of the armed forces of the First Republic. In accordance with the harsh terms of the Treaty of Batum, the Ottoman Empire demobilised most of the Armenian army, only allowing a limited force, also severely restricting where Armenian troops could operate.

==== Foreign arms ====
In 1920, Armenian representatives abroad sought arms, aeroplanes, and military advisors to reorganise and increase the size of the Armenian army to 40 thousand men. The British government eventually agreed to supply Armenia with arms in order to relieve themselves of the responsibility of enforcing the terms of the Treaty of Sèvres for Armenia. The arms shipped to Armenia valued at £829,634.90 (equivalent to £32,060,085 in 2025) included 40 thousand uniforms, 25 thousand Ross rifles, 440 Vickers machine guns, 57,500,000 small arms ammunition, and 1,077 "packages of medical supplies". However, as Armenia was landlocked, it depended on Georgian rail to receive supplies, therefore, it was negotiated to share 27 percent of the supplies with Georgia. The arms were received in Armenia six months after the Allied Supreme Council had decided to furnish Armenia with arms, yielding a "great moral boost". Though unsuccessful in obtaining military advisors, it was planned that the Armenian army would be reorganised into 3 divisions consisting of 30 thousand infantrymen consisting of 3 brigades made up of 3 battalions; moreover, 2 thousand cavalrymen would be made up of "5 regiments of 400 sabres each"; the artillery would consist of 3 thousand men, and the remaining 5 thousand into "other services". Though Armenians abroad had financed the purchase of two French fighter planes, the British in Batum impounded the fighters in March 1920 until they were released weeks later.

Armenian army size
Period	Personnel
January 1918	21,000
July 1919	18,000
January 1920	25,000
September 1920	40,000
December 1920	17,500

=== Achievements ===
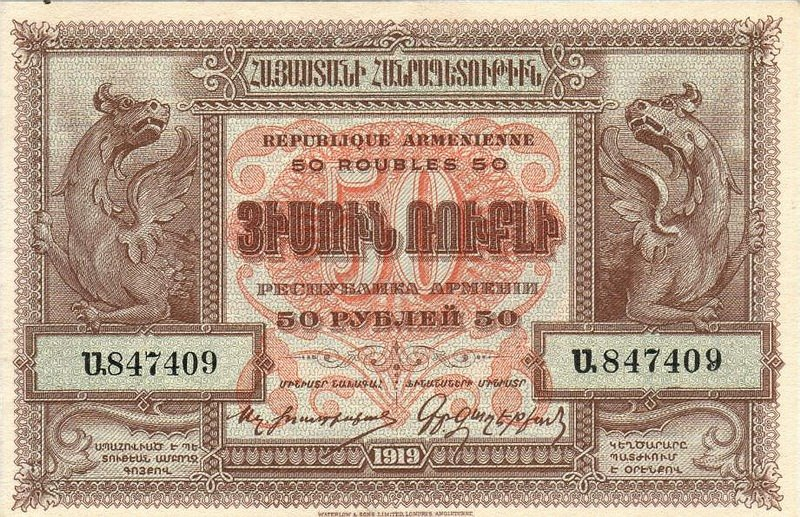
50 ruble Banknote issued in Great Britain.

The government organised an agricultural cooperation agency known as the HayCop or Hai-Koop (Հայաստանի սպառողական կոոպերատիվների միություն, 'Union of Consumer Cooperatives of Armenia') on 1 July 1919. According to Hovannisian, "the union's executive was instructed to stress the working-class nature of the movement by excluding rich peasants (kulaks) and developing facets of the rural economy which benefited the toilers". The Hai-Koop, which came as an "amalgamation" of consumer cooperative groups, strove to serve as "local agencies of production and distribution, as intermediaries between the government and primary producers, and as mainstays of communal self-improvement and popular democracy". The organisation was headed by intellectuals of Marxist and other backgrounds. Notable members of the cooperative published a biweekly journal called Hayastani Kooperatsiia (Հայաստանի Կոոպերացիա, 'The Cooperative of Armenia') By the end of 1919, the cooperative represented 60 thousand households and included 200 member associations.

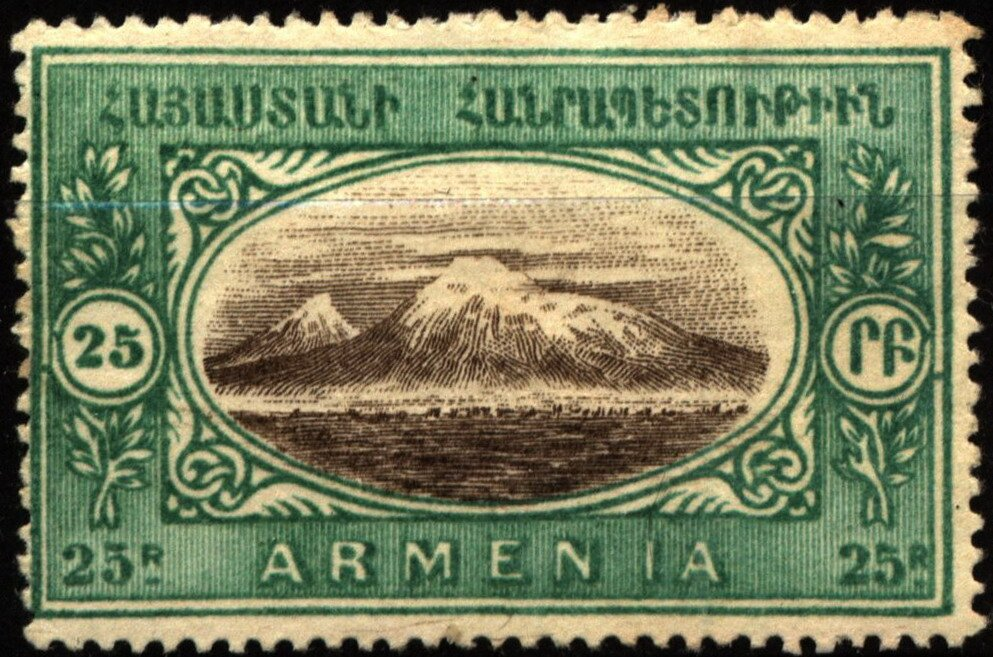
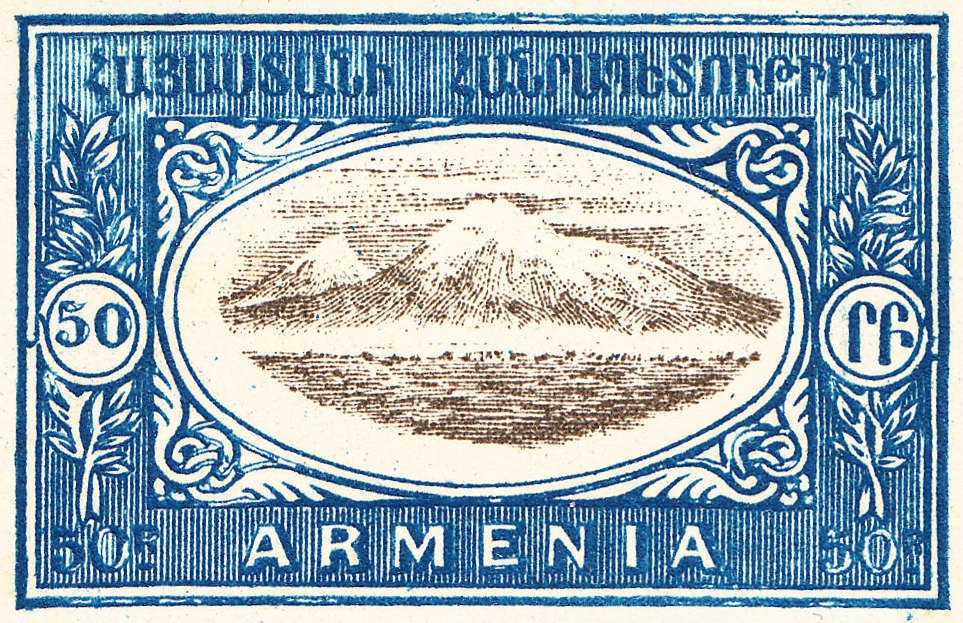
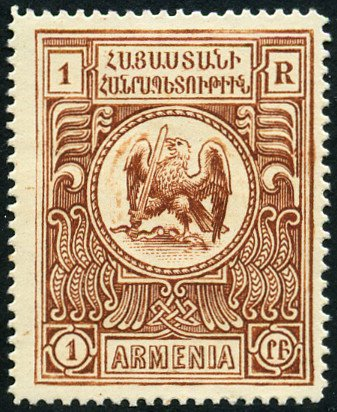
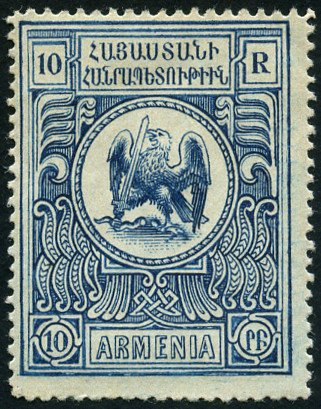
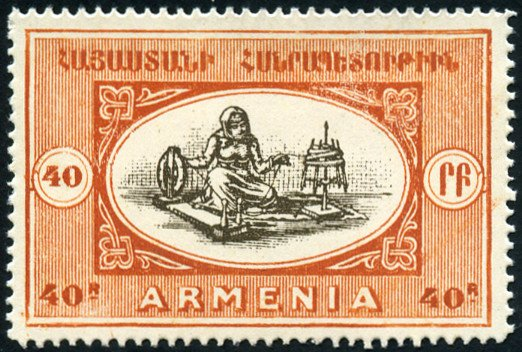
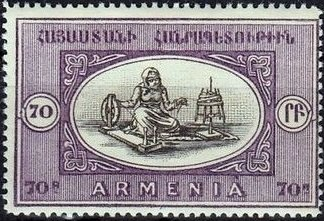
Stamps of First Republic of Armenia, 1920.

In 1920, 1,400 versts (1,500 kilometres) of telegraph lines were repaired throughout the country, and new lines were planned to interconnect Kars, Karakilisa, and Zangezur. The telegraph line expansion was so expansive that the government authorised the creation of a separate ministry to oversee it in January 1920. Roads were repaired to become fit for car-usage. By November 1919, daily passenger service via train was available between Armenia and Georgia.

In late 1918, Armenia adopted a structure of a national judiciary whereby there would be "elected tribunals of conciliation to handle small claims and minor disputes", and a legal hierarchy consisting of a circuit court of the first instance (Շրջանային դատարան, Shrjanayin dataran), as the appellate court – the Palace of Justice (Դատաստանական պալատ, Datastanakan palat), and the supreme court of cassation – the Senate (Ծերակույտ, Tserakuyt). The requirement of the adoption of the Armenian language in all government institutions "presented a more serious challenge" for jurists trained in the Russian language.

In May 1919, the government adopted a plan to establish the country's first university with faculties of history and philology, law, medicine, and physical sciences—it was opened on 31 January 1920 and classes began on 1 February with 8 professors and 200 students. The university was temporarily located in the Alexandropol "school of commerce" until the next academic year. The minister of education and culture, Nikol Aghbalian, declared that "with the opening of the historico-philological branch of the state university, Armenia was taking a major step toward restoring the old, traditional bonds with the great civilizations of the West".

The Social Revolutionary and Social Democrat parties in the Armenian parliament attempted to restrict the Armenian church's traditional role in education—members of both parties desired the abolishment of parochial schools. Only the Populists defended the right of the church in the educational system. The Dashnak government, however, refused to appropriate church-owned properties "based on the right of educational freedom", stating that education would be "secular in nature with allowance for optional religious training". Dashnak deputy Sahak Torosyan, in "voicing the opinion of most Dashnakist deputies", stated that "there was little to fear from the Church because Armenian liberalism had already overthrown the political and social power of the religious establishment. It might still have a spiritual hold, but there were other ways of dealing with that issue". The parliament eventually legislated the church's right to "retain schools that were already in operation".

== Legacy ==
The Sardarapat Memorial at the site of the Battle of Sardarabad is the symbol of the First Republic. Every year on 28 May, Armenia's political leadership and thousands of ordinary people visit the memorial to celebrate the restoration of Armenian statehood.

In his short story Antranik of Armenia, Armenian-American writer William Saroyan writes about the First Republic of Armenia: "It was a small nation of course, a very unimportant nation, surrounded on all sides by enemies, but for two years Armenia was Armenia, and the capital was Yerevan. For the first time in thousands of years Armenia was Armenia".

== See also ==
- Aftermath of World War I
- French branch of the Armenian Relief Committee

== Bibliography ==
- Adalian, Rouben Paul (2010). Historical Dictionary of Armenia (2nd ed.). Plymouth: Scarecrow Press. ISBN 978-0-8108-4337-0. OCLC 433221772.
- Aharonian, Avetis; Nubar, Boghos (1919). The Armenian Question Before the Peace Conference. New York: Press Bureau, the Armenian National Union of America.
- Akçam, Taner (2007). A Shameful Act: The Armenian Genocide and the Question of Turkish Responsibility. New York: Metropolitan Books. ISBN 978-0805079326.
- Alexandris, Alexis (1980). "Η ανάπτυξη του εθνικού πνεύματος των Ελλήνων του Πόντου, 1918–1922: Ελληνική εξωτερική πολιτική και τουρκική αντίδραση" [The Development of the National Consciousness of the Greeks of Pontus, 1918–1922: Greek Foreign Policy and the Turkish Reaction]. In Veremis, Thanos; Dimitrakopoulos, Orestes (eds.). Μελετήματα γύρω από τον Βενιζέλο και την εποχή του (in Greek). Athens: Φιλιππότης. pp. 427–474.
- Arakelian, Babken N.; Yeremian, Suren T.; Arevshatian, Sen S.; Bartikian, Hrach M.; Danielian, Eduard L.; Ter-Ghevondian, Aram N., eds. (1984). Հայ ժողովրդի պատմություն հատոր VII. ՍՈՎԵՏԱԿԱՆ ԻՇԽԱՆՈՒԹՅԱՆ ՀԱՂԹԱՆՍԿԸ ՀԱՅԱՍՏԱՆՈՒՄ [History of the Armenian People: The Victory of Soviet Power of Armenia] (PDF) (in Armenian). Vol. 7. Yerevan: Armenian SSR Academy of Sciences Publishing. Archived (PDF) from the original on 7 April 2022.
- "Armenia – International Encyclopedia of the First World War (WW1)". encyclopedia.1914-1918-online.net. Archived from the original on 5 October 2022.
- Avakian, Arra S. (1998). "The First Republic of Armenia (1918-1920)". Armenia: A Journey Through History: Van. Electric Press. ISBN 978-0-916919-24-5.
- Bassiouni, M. Cherif, ed. (2010). The Pursuit of International Criminal Justice: A World Study on Conflicts, Victimization, and Post-conflict Justice. Vol. 2. Antwerp: Intersentia. ISBN 978-94-000-0017-9. OCLC 497573622.
- Bournoutian, George (2015). "Demographic Changes in the Southwest Caucasus, 1604–1830: The Case of Historical Eastern Armenia". Forum of EthnoGeoPolitics. 3 (2). Amsterdam. ISSN 2352-3654.
- Bournoutian, George A. (2018). Armenia and Imperial Decline: The Yerevan Province, 1900–1914. Milton Park, Abingdon, Oxon: Routledge. ISBN 978-1-351-06260-2. OCLC 1037283914.
- *Bilgiç, Bestami S. (2011). "A Failed Project: The Ponto-Armenian Federation, 1919–1920". Belleten. 75 (273): 545–570. doi:10.37879/belleten.2011.545. hdl:20.500.12428/13299.
- Burdett, Anite L. P. (1998). Armenia: Political and Ethnic Boundaries 1878–1948. Slough: Archive Editions. ISBN 9781852079550.
- Chichekian, Garabet (15 April 1967). The Territorial Evolution of Armenia Since 1639: A Study in Political Geography (PDF). Ottawa: University of Ottawa. Archived (PDF) from the original on 9 February 2020.
- Chiclet, Christophe (2005). Roy, Olivier (ed.). Turkey Today: A European Country?. Anthem Press. ISBN 9781843311720.
- Childs, William John (1922). "Armenia" . Encyclopædia Britannica. Vol. 30 (12th ed.).
- Danielyan, Eduard (2003). "Armenia". In Mokyr, Joel (ed.). The Oxford Encyclopedia of Economic History, Volume 2. Oxford University Press.
- Darbinian, Reuben; Mandalian, James G.; Tashjian, James H., eds. (1968). "A Memorandum on the Recognition of the Government of the Independent Republic of Armenia" (PDF). The Armenian Review. 21 (2–82): 8. Archived (PDF) from the original on 10 September 2024.
- de Waal, Thomas (2003). Black Garden: Armenia and Azerbaijan Through Peace and War. New York: New York University Press. ISBN 978-0-8147-1945-9.
- de Waal, Thomas (2010). The Caucasus: An Introduction. Oxford University Press. ISBN 9780199746200.
- de Waal, Thomas (2015). Great Catastrophe: Armenians and Turks in the Shadow of Genocide. Oxford: Oxford University Press. ISBN 978-0-19-935070-4. OCLC 897378977.
- "Declaration of Independence (May 30, 1918)". ARF Archives Institute. Archived from the original on 3 July 2013.
- Dinçel, Yusuf (2026). "The Turkish-Greek War (1919–1922) in Light of Archival Documents". Nuova Rivista Storica. 110 (1): 113–140. doi:10.32604/nrs.2026.077200.
- "Division of Armenology and Social Sciences". Armenian National Academy of Sciences.
- "Gains of the Turkish Nationalists: Armenia's Hopes Crushed by Kemal—Complicated Situation in Syria—Progress in Palestine". Current History. 13 (1): 66–69. 1921. JSTOR 45329058.
- * Frazier to Colby (Report). Athens: U.S. Department of State. 14 May 1920. File No. 763.72119/9863.
- Gharibyan, Alik; Hakobyan, Hayk. The Social-Economic and Political situation in Transcaucasus (1918–1921) (PDF). Archived (PDF) from the original on 7 August 2022.
- Grigoryan, Grigor (2005). "ՀԱՅԱՍՏԱՆԻ ՀԱՆՐԱՊԵՏՈՒԹՅԱՆ ԲՆԱԿՉՈՒԹՅԱՆ ՎԻՃԱԿԱԳՐՈՒԹՅՈՒՆԸ 1919Թ" [Population statistics of the Republic of Armenia for 1919]. Issues of Armenian History (in Armenian). 5. Yerevan: Institute of History of the National Academy of Sciences of the Republic of Armenia: 122–128. ISBN 99941-969-0-1. Archived from the original on 16 January 2023.
- Hakobyan, Tatul (28 May 2009). "On Armenian independence day, a visit to Sardarapat, symbol of Armenian pride". Armenian Reporter. Archived from the original on 21 September 2013.
- Hakobyan, Tatul (9 August 2015). "Sèvres: The Unfulfilled Armenian Dream". ANI Armenian Research Center. Archived from the original on 23 September 2015.
- Hakobyan, Ararat M. (2018). Khudinyan, Gevorg (ed.). "ՀՀ ԿԱՌԱՎԱՐՈՒԹՅՈՒՆԸ 1918 – 1920 ԹԹ. ԵՎ ՆՐԱ ԳՈՐԾՈՒՆԵՈՒԹՅԱՆ ԱՌԱՆՁՆԱՀԱՏԿՈՒԹՅՈՒՆՆԵՐԸ" [The government of the Republic of Armenia in 1918–1920 and characteristics of its activities] (PDF). Hamahaykakan Handes (in Armenian) (4). "Vem handes" SPY: 98–110. ISSN 1829-1864. Archived (PDF) from the original on 11 January 2023.
- Hakobyan, Tatul (3 January 2019). "Հայաստանի վարչական բաժանումները 1918–1922 թվականներին" [Administrative divisions of Armenia in 1918–1922]. CivilNet (in Armenian). Archived from the original on 13 April 2021.
- Hakobyan, Tatul (4 April 2020). "Հայաստանի բնակչությունը 1919–ին․ Երևանը գրեթե հասնում է Ալեքսանդրապոլին" [The population of Armenia in 1919. Yerevan almost reaches Alexandropol]. CivilNet. Archived from the original on 11 April 2021.
- Hassiotis, I. K. (2012). "Greek foreign policy towards the Armenian Question: a historical survey". Byzantine and Modern Greek Studies. 36 (2): 215–233. doi:10.1179/0307013112Z.00000000013.
- Hassiotis, Ioannis K. (1985). "Shared Illusions: Greek-Armenian Co-operation in Asia Minor and the Caucasus (1917–1922)". Greece and Great Britain During World War I. Thessaloniki: Institute for Balkan Studies. pp. 139–192.
- Harutyunyan, Babken (2019). Atlas of the Armenian Genocide. Vardan Mkhitaryan. Erevan: Yerevan State University. ISBN 978-9939-0-2999-3. OCLC 1256558984.
- Herzig, Edmund; Kurkchiyan, Marina (2005). The Armenians: Past and Present in the Making of National Identity. London: RoutledgeCurzon. ISBN 0-203-00493-0. OCLC 229988654.
- Hewsen, Robert H.; Salvatico, Christopher C. (2001). Armenia: A Historical Atlas (PDF). Chicago: University of Chicago Press. ISBN 0-226-33228-4. OCLC 42027370.
- Hille, Charlotte (2010). State Building and Conflict Resolution in the Caucasus. Leiden: Brill. ISBN 978-90-474-4136-6. OCLC 668211543.
- Hovannisian, Richard G (1967). Armenia on the Road to Independence, 1918. Berkeley: University of California Press. ISBN 978-0520005747. OCLC 1028172352.
- Hovannisian, Richard G. (1971). The Republic of Armenia. Vol. 1: The First Year, 1918–1919. Berkeley: University of California Press. ISBN 978-0520019843.
- Hovannisian, Richard G. (1982). The Republic of Armenia. Vol. 2: From Versailles to London, 1919–1920. Berkeley: University of California Press. ISBN 978-0520041868.
- Hovannisian, Richard G. (1996a). The Republic of Armenia. Vol. 3: From London to Sèvres, February–August 1920. Berkeley: University of California Press. ISBN 978-0520088030.
- Hovannisian, Richard G. (1996b). The Republic of Armenia. Vol. 4: Between Crescent and Sickle: Partition and Sovietization. Berkeley: University of California Press. ISBN 978-0520088047.
- Hovhannisian, Sen (1 January 2019). Atlas of Armenia. Yerevan: Nahapet. ISBN 978-9939-856-52-0. OCLC 1124982334.
- Kazemzadeh, Firuz (1951). The Struggle for Transcaucasia (1917–1921). New York City: Philosophical Library. OCLC 1943521.
- Khachikyan, Armen (2010). Kosyan, Aram (ed.). History of Armenia: A Brief Review. Author of maps Robert H. Hewsen. Yerevan: Edit Print. ISBN 978-9939-52-294-4. OCLC 760069375.
- Korkotyan, Zaven (1932). Խորհրդային Հայաստանի բնակչությունը վերջին հարյուրամյակում (1831–1931) [The population of Soviet Armenia in the last century (1831–1931)] (PDF) (in Armenian). Yerevan: Pethrat. Archived from the original (PDF) on 2 February 2022.
- Lampsidis, Odysseus (2002). "Προσπάθειες στρατιωτικής οργανώσεως των Ελληνοποντίων (25 Απριλίου 1919–5 Απριλίου 1920): Νέα έκδοση της εκθέσεως Δ. Καθενιώτη" [Attempts to Organise the Pontic Greeks Militarily (25 April 1919–5 April 1920): New Edition of the Report of D. Katheniotis]. Δωδώνη. Ιστορία και Αρχαιολογία (in Greek). 31. University of Ioannina: 5–222.
- Libaridian, Gerald J. (2007). Modern Armenia: people, nation, state. New Brunswick, New Jersey: Transaction Publishers. ISBN 978-1-4128-0648-0.
- Mirzoyan, Alla (2010). Armenia, the Regional Powers, and the West: Between History and Geopolitics. Palgrave Macmillan. ISBN 9780230106352.
- Myklebost, Hallstein (1989). "Armenia and the Armenians". Norsk Geografisk Tidsskrift - Norwegian Journal of Geography. 43 (3): 135–154. doi:10.1080/00291958908552231. ISSN 0029-1951.
- "Նախկին վարչապետներ" [Former Prime Ministers] (in Armenian). Government of Armenia Website.
- Nichanian, Mikaël [in French] (2015). Détruire les Arméniens. Histoire d'un génocide [Destroying the Armenians: History of a Genocide] (in French). Presses Universitaires de France. ISBN 978-2-13-062617-6.
- Nazaryan, Lousine (28 May 2009). "Historian Ashot Melkonyan: "The idea of unity of the Armenian nation must not be buried in oblivion"". Hayastani Hanrapetutyun.
- "New Republics in the Caucasus: Armenia, Azerbaidjan, and Georgia: Their Mutual Relations and Their Present Status". Current History. 11 (3). University of California Press: 491–498. 1920. JSTOR 45325199.
- Palakean, Grigoris (2009). Armenian Golgotha: A Memoir of the Armenian Genocide, 1915–1918. Vintage Books. ISBN 978-1-4000-9677-0.
- Papian, Ara (2007). "The Arbitral Award on Turkish-Armenian Boundary by Woodrow Wilson (Historical Background, Legal Aspects, and International Dimensions)". Iran & the Caucasus. 11 (2): 255–294. doi:10.1163/157338407X265487. ISSN 1609-8498. JSTOR 25597337.
- Pasdermadjian, Garegin (1918). Why Armenia Should be Free Armenia's Role in the Present War. Boston: Hairenik Publishing.
- Payaslian, Simon (2007). "The Republic of Armenia: The First Republic". The History of Armenia. New York: Palgrave Macmillan US. pp. 145–170. doi:10.1057/9780230608580_7. ISBN 978-0-230-60858-0.
- Petrosyan, Gegam (2012). Отношения Республики Армения с Россией (1918–1920 гг.) [Relations of the Republic of Armenia with Russia (1918–1920)] (in Russian). Yerevan: Yerevan State University Publishing House.
- Petsalis-Diomidis, N. (1972). "Hellenism in Southern Russia and the Ukrainian campaign: their effect on the Pontus question (1919)". Balkan Studies. 13 (2): 221–263.
- Pipes, Richard (1959). "Demographic and Ethnographic Changes in Transcaucasia, 1897-1956". Middle East Journal. 13 (1). Middle East Institute: 41–63. JSTOR 4323084.
- "Richard Hovannisian to Discuss First Republic of Armenia at Lecture in Belmont". The Armenian Weekly. 3 November 2015.
- Saparov, Arsène (2014). From conflict to autonomy in the Caucasus: the Soviet Union and the making of Abkhazia, South Ossetia and Nagorno Karabakh. Routledge. ISBN 978-1-317-63783-7. OCLC 1124532887.
- Saroyan, William (1943). 31 selected stories from "Inhale and Exhale". New York: Avon Book Company.
- Smele, Jonathan D. (2015). Historical Dictionary of the Russian Civil Wars, 1916–1926. Lanham, Maryland: Rowman & Littlefield Publishers. ISBN 978-1-4422-5281-3. OCLC 923010906.
- Soviet Armenian Encyclopedia (in Armenian). Vol. 6. Yerevan: Armenian Encyclopedia Publishing House. 1980.
- Suny, Ronald Grigor (1993). Looking Toward Ararat: Armenia in Modern History. Bloomington: Indiana University Press. ISBN 9780253207739.
- "The Birth of the First Republic of Armenia". civilnet.am. CivilNet. 28 May 2013.
- Tsutsiev, Arthur (2014). Atlas of the Ethno-Political History of the Caucasus (PDF). Translated by Nora Seligman Favorov. New Haven: Yale University Press. ISBN 9780300153088. Archived (PDF) from the original on 17 June 2023.
- Walker, Christopher J. (1990). Armenia: The Survival of a Nation (revised 2nd ed.). New York: St. Martin's Press. ISBN 9780312042301.
- *Yavuz, Bige Sükan (March 2003). "Kurtuluş Savaşı Sırasında Kurulması Düşünülen Rum-Ermeni Konfederasyonu" [The Rum-Armenian Confederation Considered During the War of Independence]. Atatürk Araştırma Merkezi Dergisi (in Turkish). 19 (55): 17–40.
- Yerasimos, Stéphane (1989). "La question du Pont-Euxin (1912–1923)". Guerres mondiales et conflits contemporains (153). Presses Universitaires de France: 9–34.
