= Olur District =

Olur
- District and municipality
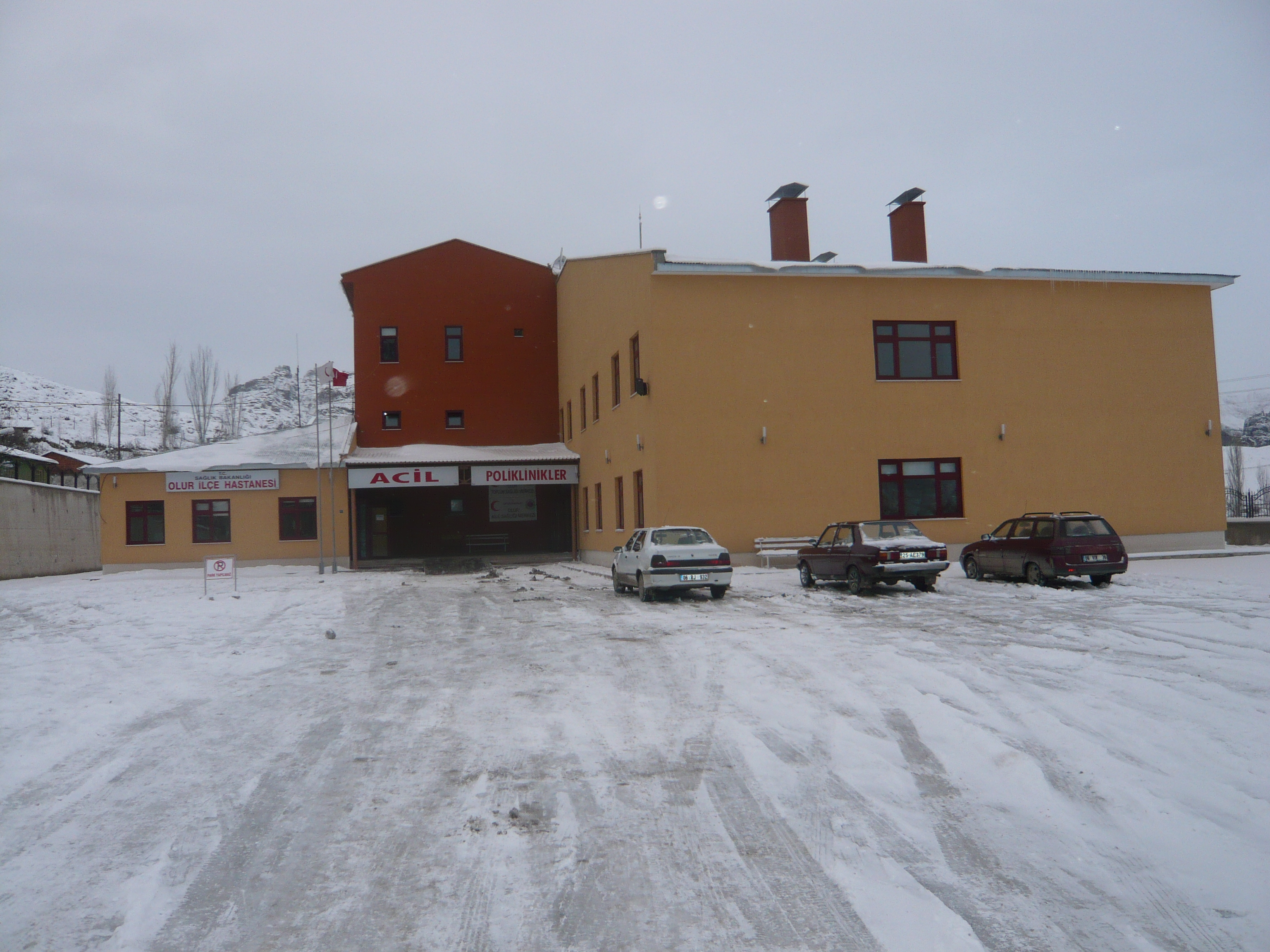

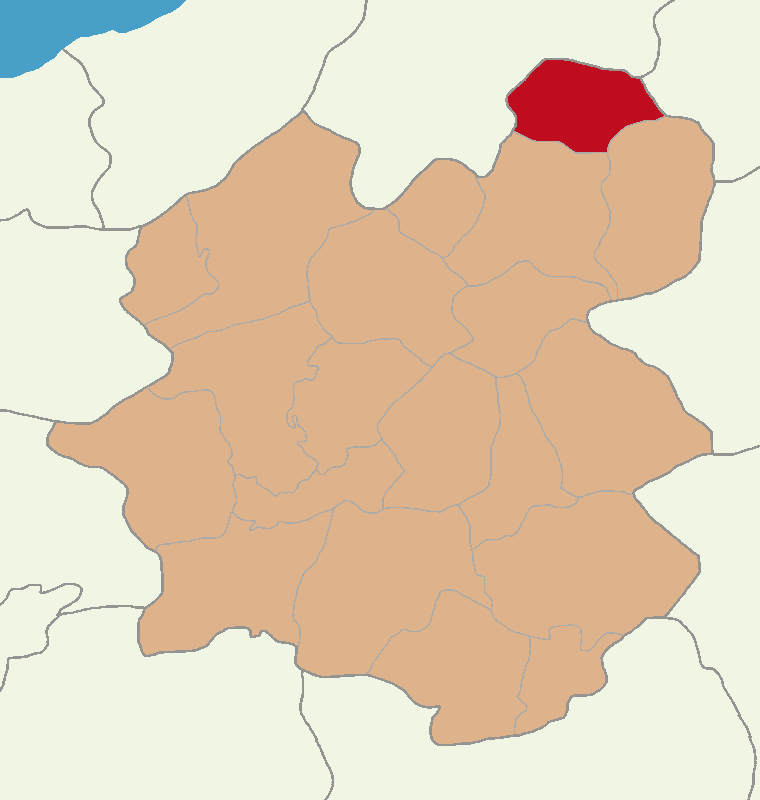
- Map showing Olur District in Erzurum Province

- Location within Turkey
- Coordinates: 40°49′47″N 42°07′43″E
- Country: Turkey
- Province: Erzurum

Government
  - Mayor: Vedat Ergün (MHP)
- Area: 893 km^{2} (345 sq mi)
- Population (2022): 6,262
  - Density: 7.01/km^{2} (18.2/sq mi)
- Time zone: UTC+3 (TRT)
- Postal code: 25650
- Area code: 0442
- Climate: Dfb
- Website: www.olur.bel.tr

Olur, formerly Tayotskar, Tavusker and Taoskari (Armenian: Տայոց քար, meaning "Rock of Tayk"; Georgian: ტაოსკარი, meaning "Gates of Tao"), is a municipality and district of Erzurum Province, Turkey. Its area is 893 km.^{2}, The centre of Olur district is Olur town and its population is 6,262 (2022). The mayor is Vedat Ergün (Nationalist Movement Party).

== Composition ==
There are 42 neighbourhoods in Olur District:

- Akbayır
- Aktepe
- Altunkaya
- Aşağıçayırlı
- Aşağıkaracasu
- Atlı
- Begendik
- Beşkaya
- Boğazgören
- Bozdoğan
- Çataksu
- Coşkunlar
- Eğlek
- Ekinlik
- Filizli
- Güngöründü
- Hükkam
- Ilıkaynak
- Kaban
- Kaledibi
- Karakoçlar
- Keçili
- Kekikli
- Köprübaşı
- Merkez
- Oğuzkent
- Olgun
- Olurdere
- Ormanağzı
- Şalpazarı
- Sarıbaşak
- Soğukgöze
- Süngübayır
- Taşgeçit
- Ürünlü
- Uzunharman
- Yaylabaşı
- Yeşilbağlar
- Yıldızkaya
- Yolgözler
- Yukarıçayırlı
- Yukarıkaracasu
