= Babos, Şenkaya =

Babos or Babosi (Georgian: ბაბოსი) is a former village in the historical Tao region, today in the Şenkaya district of Erzurum Province in Turkey. It is now a hamlet (mezra) of Çatalelma.

== History ==
Tao, where the village of Babos or Babosi is located, was one of the regions that formed Georgia in the Middle Ages. Indeed, the Ottomans captured this region from the Georgians following the 1549 Georgian campaign.

Babos or Babosi was recorded as Babos (بابوس) in the Ottoman cebe defter of Çıldır Province (Çıldır Eyaleti) covering the period 1694-1732. According to this register, in 1136 AH (1723/1724), the village was affiliated with the Bardız district (nahiye) of the Oltu liva. Its yield was 6,000 akçe, and it was given to a man named Ismail.

The village of Babos, or Babosi, was ceded to Russia by the Ottoman Empire as part of the war reparations following the 1877-1878 Russo-Turkish War, as part of the Treaty of Berlin. In the 1886 Russian census, Babos (Бабосъ) was recorded as "Kışla" (Б—кишлa). At that time, Babos was one of 14 settlements in the Kaskanlı sub-district of the Oltu district (uchastok) of the Olti Okrug. Its population consisted of 51 people, 29 men and 22 women, living in nine households. The Kaskanlı were a Kurdish tribe, and the entire population of the sub-district was Kurdish.

Babosi, or Babos, is not listed as a village in censuses conducted after the founding of the Republic of Turkey. In fact, although the villages of Posik and Nusunk were mentioned in the Ottoman village list of 1928, Babos, located between these two villages, was not included as a village. The settlement, which is called "Babahan" today, is located in the forest area in the north of Çatalelma.
