= Alosi =

Village in the Tao region, Turkey

Coordinates: 40°55′20″N 42°02′03″E

Alosi or Alos (Georgian: ალოსი or ალოისი) is a village in the historical Tao region. It is currently a neighborhood (mahalle) of the village of Atlı (formerly Ori), located in the Olur district of Erzurum Province in Turkey.

== History ==
Tao, where the village of Alosi is located, was one of the regions that formed Georgia in the Middle Ages. Indeed, the Ottomans captured this region from the Georgians following the 1549 Georgian campaign.

The village of Alosi is recorded as "Aldkos" (الدكوس) in the Ottoman cebe defter of Çıldır Province (Çıldır Eyaleti), covering the period 1694–1732. According to this register, Alosi or "Aldkos" was affiliated with the Tavusker (Taoskari) sub-district (nahiye) of the Ardanuç Province (liva). In 1123 AH (1711/1712), the village's revenue was 23,500 akçe, and it was granted as a zeamet to a man named Mahmud.

Alosi village was included in the Tavusker Sanjak of Çıldır Province (Eyalet-i Çıldır) in the 1835 Ottoman census. This census, which counted only the male population for military service and tax purposes, showed 20 males in 8 households. Adding the same number of females as males, the village's total population can be estimated at 40 people.

Alosi village was ceded to Russia by the Ottoman Empire as part of the war reparations in accordance with the Treaty of Berlin signed in 1878 following the Russo-Turkish War of 1877-1878. The village, recorded as Alos (Алосъ) by the Russian administration in its 1886 census, was one of the 21 villages of the Tavusker sub-district (маркязъ) of the Olti district (uchastok) of the Olti okrug. Its population consisted of 35 people, 17 male and 18 female, living in seven households and all of whom were registered as Turks.

The village of Alosi was mistakenly recorded as Abos (آبوس) in the 1928 Ottoman village list. At that time, the village was affiliated with the Olur sub-district of the Oltu district of the Erzurum Province. The fact that it was not listed as a separate village in later censuses suggests that it was incorporated into the village of Ori as a neighborhood shortly thereafter. This settlement, still known as "Alos," is a neighborhood of Atlı village, located north of the village center.
