= Chanchuri, Şenkaya =

Chanchuri (Georgian: ჭანჭური) is a village that has disappeared from the historical Tao region. The settlement area of the village was located south of the village of Posik in the Şenkaya District of Erzurum Province today in Turkey.

== History ==
Chanchuri (ჭანჭური) is the name of a type of plum in the Georgian language. The name of the village, recorded in Ottoman as ‘Cancur’ (جانجور) or ‘Çançur’ (چانچور), may derive from this plum.

Tao, where the village of Chanchuri was located, was one of the regions that made up Georgia in the Middle Ages. Indeed, the Ottomans seized this region from the Georgians following their 1549 campaign in Georgia.

In the 1574 land-survey register (mufassal defter) of the Ottoman administration, there were two villages recorded under the name ‘JanJur’ in the Bardız district (nahiye) of the Olti Province (liva). One of these was deserted. The other was home to six Muslim households. The village of Chanchuri appears as ‘Çançur-i Ulya’ (چانچور علیا) in notes added later to the 1595 land-survey register (mufassal defter). At this time, the settlement retained the same administrative status. Based on the name "Çançur-i Ulya" (Upper Chanchuri) in this register, it can be said that the other village recorded in 1574 was Çançur-i Süfla (Lower Chanchuri).

The village of Chanchuri is also recorded as ‘Çançur’ (چانچور) in the Ottoman cebe defter covering the period 1694-1732 in the Province of Çıldır (Çıldır Eyaleti). In 1132 AH (1719/1720), the village, which was part of the Misirsor district (nahiye) of the Olti sanjak, had an annual revenue of 8,000 akçe and was left to brothers named Sadık, İbrahim and Yusuf.

Sergi Jikia, a Georgian Turkologist who published the detailed Ottoman land-survey register (mufassal defter) of 1595, wrote that the settlement marked as ‘Chanchur’ (Чанчур) northwest of the village of Bardız on the Russian map must be the village of Chanchuri. However, in the 1886 Russian census, no village with this name was recorded in the Olti district (uchastok) of Olti Okrug. It can be understood from this record that Chanchuri ceased to be a village before this date.
