= Oskihati =

Vanished village in Şenkaya District, Erzurum, Georgia

Oskihati (Georgian: ოსკიჰათი) is a vanished village in the historical Tao region. Its settlement was located in the Şenkaya District of Erzurum province.

== History ==
Oskihati (ოსკიჰათი) was recorded as Oskihat (اوسكیحات) in the Ottoman land-survey register (mufassal defter) of 1595.

The Tao region, where the village of Oskihati is located, was one of the areas that constituted Georgia in the Middle Ages. Indeed, the Ottomans captured this region from the Georgians in the years following the Georgian Campaign of 1549.

In the Ottoman land-survey register (mufassal defter) of 1574, Oskihati was located in the Bardız district of the Oltu liva. The village's population consisted of nine households, all Christian. In the 1595 Ottoman land registry, the village's administrative status remained unchanged.

The village of Oskihati was recorded as Oski[hat] ([اوسكی[حات) in the Ottoman cebe defter of Çıldır Province, covering the period 1694-1732. In 1120 AH (1708/1709), the village held the same administrative status, with a revenue of 8,300 akçe, and was assigned to a man named İbrahim.

Georgian Turkologist Sergi Jikia, in a note in his 1595 Ottoman detailed registry, noted that Oskihati appeared on the Russian map as "Oskyat" (Оският). Oskihati's name is missing from later records, and it appears that it ceased to be a village at an unknown date.
