= Ureki, Oltu =

Ureki (Georgian: ურეკი) is an ancient settlement in the historical Tao region. It's located within the boundaries of the village of Bahçelikışla present-day Oltu district of Erzurum Province in Turkey.

== History ==
Ureki (ურეკი), the former name of Örük village, means "virgin forest" in Georgian. The village's name was written as Urek (اورك) in the Ottoman land-survey register (mufassal defter) of 1595. The village's name later evolved into "Örük" in Turkish.

The Tao region, where Ureki is located, was within the borders of Georgia in the Middle Ages. Indeed, the Ottomans captured this region from the Georgians following the 1549 Georgian campaign.

The village of Ureki was included in the Northern District of the Oltu Liva in the Ottoman detailed register of 1574, titled Defter-i Mufassal-i Vilayet-i Gürcistan. The village's population consisted of 73 Christian households. in the Ottoman land-survey register (mufassal defter) of 1595 also listed Ureki within the Northern (Kuzey) district of the Oltu Liva within the Georgian Vilayet (Gürcistan Vilayeti). This register also listed two other villages bearing the name Ureki in the Northern (Kuzey) and Anzav districts of the Oltu Liva.

Ureki was ceded to Russia by the Ottoman Empire as part of the war reparations following the 1877-1878 Russo-Turkish War, in accordance with the Treaty of Berlin. The village, recorded as Erük-Kubad (Eryuk-Kubad) by the Russian administration in its 1886 census, was one of the 13 villages in the Avdost sub-district of the Olti district (uchastok) of the Olti Okrug. Its population consisted of 162 people, 92 women and 70 men, living in 27 households. Of this population, 88 were recorded as Armenians and 72 as Turks. In this census, there was also a village in the Oltu district, recorded as "Eruk" and attached to the Erük-Anzav sub-district.

Georgian historian and archaeologist Ekvtime Takaishvili, in the notes of a research expedition he conducted in 1907, wrote that Ureki, which he wrote as "Uruki" (ურუკი), was adjacent to the village of Bahçelikışla and was inhabited by Armenians.

Ureki or Örük was later stripped of its village status and became a neighborhood of Bahçelikışla village.
