= Bobisgeri =

Bobisgeri (Georgian: ბობისგერი) is a vanished village in the historical Tao region, in what is now the Şenkaya district of Erzurum Province in Turkey. Bobisgeri's settlement area lies within the borders of the village of Zümrüt, historically known as Pertusi.

== History ==
The Tao region, where the village of Bobisgeri is located, was one of the areas that formed Georgia in the Middle Ages. Indeed, the Ottomans captured this region from the Georgians in the 16th century, following the Georgian campaign of 1549. The Bobisgeri Church, known to have existed in the village and with Georgian inscriptions, also dates from this period.

According to the Ottoman land-survey register (mufassal defter) of 1574, Bobisgeri was one of the villages of the Kop (Kvabi) sub-district of the Oltu liva. The village, which was recorded as "Bobizger," was completely deserted by this time. The village may have been abandoned during the Ottoman-Georgian War or evacuated later.

The village of Bobisgeri was ceded to Russia by the Ottoman Empire in accordance with the Treaty of Berlin signed in 1878 following the 1877-1878 Russo-Turkish War. However, although Pertusi was listed as a village in the Nusungi sub-district of the Oltu district (uchastok) of the Olti okrug in the 1886 Russian census, Bobisgeri was not listed as a separate village.

Georgian historian and archaeologist Ekvtime Takaishvili wrote in 1907 that the village of Bobisgeri was inhabited by Armenians. This finding suggests that the Russian administration, just as it had in Pertusi, settled Armenians in Bobisgeri late in its life. Georgian inscriptions in the Bobisgeri Church indicate that it was a Georgian village before the Ottoman period. According to Takaishvili, Bobisgeri was located in a low-lying area below the village of Pertusi, and no one lived there during the summer. Indeed, the Bobisgeri Church was located 4 kilometers north of Pertusi.

The village of Bobisgeri has completely disappeared, with only the ruins of the church remaining. The site of this ancient settlement is today called "Bobuzgir."
