= Ormanlı =

Ormanlı can refer to:

- Ormanlı, Artvin
- Ormanlı, Şenkaya
