= Güntay Şimşek =

Turkish journalist and television producer

Güntay Şimşek (born 1968) is a Turkish journalist, newspaper columnist and television producer whose work has focused on industry, aviation, transportation, energy, defense and telecommunications. He has written newspaper columns since 1995 and has produced the aviation and travel program Airport since 1998.

== Early life and education ==
Şimşek was born in 1968 in the Olur district of Erzurum. He completed his primary and secondary education there before attending Bursa School of Hotel Management and Tourism. He studied at the Faculty of Letters of Atatürk University from 1984 to 1988.

== Career ==
Şimşek began his journalism career in 1990 as a reporter for the newspaper Zaman. In 1994, he began preparing a weekly transportation page for the paper. In 1995, he became news editor and began writing a column around the same time.

Alongside his position at Zaman, he began publishing the monthly magazines Transport and Global Enerji under Kaan Film Prodüksiyon, serving as editor-in-chief of both.

In 2003, he moved to the Sabah Group, where he continued as a columnist and also headed the group's Economy Magazine Division.

After he moved to the Sabah Group, both magazines continued to be published under the group, and Şimşek remained editor-in-chief. He also served as publishing director of the weekly economy magazine Para.

In 2008, he began working for the Habertürk group. Within the group, he served as economy coordinator. He began writing a column for the newspaper Habertürk, and his columns continue to be published on Habertürk's website.

== Airport ==
Şimşek launched Airport on TGRT in 1998. Focused on aviation and travel, the program was later broadcast on NTV and ATV, and subsequently on Habertürk. Airport covers airlines, aircraft manufacturers, airports, developments in aviation, and travel destinations.

In 2022, Airport received the "Current Affairs Program of the Year" award at the 26th Altın Objektif Awards, organized by the Magazine Journalists Association.

Şimşek appears as a commentator on Bloomberg HT on topics related to his professional fields.

In 2018, in an interview with Gerçek Hayat magazine, he discussed Istanbul Airport and the development of Turkish aviation.

== Photography ==
In February 2026, Şimşek opened a solo photography exhibition titled "Eşik; İki Dünya Arası – Ara Hâl / Ara Zaman" ("Threshold; Between Two Worlds – Liminal State / Liminal Time") at the Music Platform Hall of the Istanbul Atatürk Cultural Centre. Featuring more than 60 photographs, the exhibition focused on the relationship between nature, technology and civilization.

== Awards ==
- 2001 – Anatolian Journalists Association, "Columnist of the Year"
- 2022 – Airport, Magazine Journalists Association, 26th Altın Objektif Awards, "Current Affairs Program of the Year"
