= Dolunay =

Dolunay may refer to:

- Dolunay (TV series)
- Dolunay, Kemaliye, Turkey
- Dolunay, Lice, Turkey
- Dolunay, Şenkaya, Turkey
- Dolunay Soysert (born 1973), Turkish actress
- Burcu Dolunay (born 1984), Turkish freestyle swimmer
- Mehmet Ozan Dolunay (born 1990), Turkish actor
