= Altunkaya, Olur =

Village in Turkey

Altunkaya
- Neighbourhood
- Location within Turkey
- Coordinates: 40.8798°N 42.2462°E
- Country: Turkey
- Province: Erzurum
- District: Olur
- Population (2022): 83
- Time zone: UTC+3 (TRT)

Altunkaya is a neighborhood in the municipality and district of Olur, Erzurum Province in Turkey. Its population is 83 as of 2022.

Between 1778 and 1900, gold was mined as evidenced by multiple existing tunnels in the village and by its name "Altunkaya" which translates to "golden rock".
