= Oyuktaş =

Oyuktaş can refer to:

- Oyuktaş, Kozluk
- Oyuktaş, Şenkaya
