= Kürkçü =

Kürkçü (in Turkish meaning Furrier) may refer to:

- Kürkçü, Alaca
- Kürkçü, Bor, village in Niğde Province, Turkey
- Kürkçü, Mut, village in Mersin Province, Turkey
- Kürkçü, Şenkaya
- Kürkçü Han (Furriers' Inn), a part of Istanbul Grand Bazaar
