= İnceçay =

İnceçay can refer to:

- İnceçay, Kargı
- İnceçay, Şenkaya
