= Gözebaşı =

Gözebaşı can refer to:

- Gözebaşı, Adıyaman
- Gözebaşı, Elâzığ
- Gözebaşı, Kocaköy
- Gözebaşı, Şenkaya
