= Yaylabaşı =

Yaylabaşı can refer to:

- Yaylabaşı, Erzincan
- Yaylabaşı, Osmancık
- Yaylabaşı, Olur
