= Tezonisi =

Tezonisi (Georgian: ტეზონისი) is a vanished village in the historical Tao region. The settlement is located within the boundaries of the Sarısaz neighborhood of the Oltu district of Erzurum Province in Turkey.

== History ==
The Tao region, where the village of Tezonisi is located, was within the borders of Georgia in the Middle Ages. Indeed, the Ottomans captured this region from the Georgians following the 1549 Georgian campaign. The Tezonisi Church, which has survived to this day in ruins, may also date from this period.

The village of Tezonisi is listed as "Tezonis" or "Tazonis" (თაძონისი) in the Ottoman land-survey register (mufassal defter) of 1574. At that time, the village was part of the Southern district (nahiye) of the Oltu Liva. The village had only four Muslim households.

The village of Tezonisi is not included in later Ottoman census records. Indeed, although the village of Zardenisi (Sarısaz), within whose borders the Tezonisi Church is located today, was recorded as a village in the Ottoman pocket register (1694–1732), Tezonisi is not mentioned in this register.

Georgian historian and archaeologist Ekvtime Takaishvili, in the notes of his 1907 research trip to the Oltu region, referred to the site of the ruined church south of Jujurusi (ჯუჯურუსი) village and near Zardenisi (ზარდენისი) village as "Tezonisi" (ტეზონისი). Takaishvili's mention of the church alone, and not of a settlement, suggests that Tezonisi village had previously been deserted.

The village of Tezonisi is known to be located 2 kilometers northwest of the Sarısaz neighborhood due to the location of the Tezonisi Church. What remains of this village is the Tezonisi Church, a place of worship during the Christian era.
