= Özyurt =

Özyurt can refer to:

- Özyurt, Devrek
- Özyurt, Polatlı
- Özyurt, Şenkaya
