= Hoşköy =

Hoşköy can refer to:

- Hoşköy, Elâzığ
- Hoşköy, Şenkaya
