= Çamlıalan =

Çamlıalan can refer to:

- Çamlıalan, Gündoğmuş
- Çamlıalan, Şenkaya
