= Başbağlar =

Başbağlar can refer to:

- Başbağlar, Erzincan
- Başbağlar, Oltu
