= Beşkaya =

Beşkaya can refer to:

- Beşkaya, Olur
- Beşkaya, Tercan
