= Begendik, Olur =

Village in Turkey

Begendik
- Neighbourhood
- Location in Turkey
- Coordinates: 40.9064°N 42.2341°E
- Country: Turkey
- Province: Erzurum
- District: Olur
- Population (2022): 141
- Time zone: UTC+3 (TRT)

Begendik is a neighbourhood in the municipality and Olur district, Erzurum Province in Turkey. Its population is 141 (2022).

The former name of this settlement was Pirdanos. It is written as Pirdanosi (ფირდანოსი) in Georgian. In the Ottoman land-survey register (mufassal defter) of 1595, it is recorded as Pirdanos (پردانوس).
