= Köşkköy =

Köşkköy may refer to the following places in Turkey:

- Neighborhood in Elbistan, Kahramanmaraş Province
- Neighborhood in Edremit, Van, Van Province
- Village in Hamur District, Ağrı Province
- Neighborhood in Milas, Muğla Province
- Neighborhood in Muradiye, Van Province
- Köşkköy, Şenkaya, Erzurum Province
- Neighborhood in Yakutiye, Erzurum Province
