= Yelkıran, Şenkaya =

Coordinates: 40°38′05″N 42°22′57″E

Yelkıran is a neighbourhood in the municipality and district of Şenkaya, Erzurum Province in Turkey.

== History ==
The old name of Yelkıran is Mokhrili. The Georgian toponym Mokhrili (მოხრილი) means "bent" or "twisted". It was recorded as "Mokhrul" (موخرول) in the 1574 and 1595 Ottoman land-survey register (mufassal defter).

The village of Mokhrili is located in Tao, one of the regions that formed Georgia in the Middle Ages. Indeed, the Ottomans captured this region from the Georgians in the 16th century, following the 1549 campaign.

According to the Ottoman land-survey register (mufassal defter) of 1574, Mokhrili was affiliated with the Penek sub-district (nahiye) of the Ardahan-i Büzürg liva. The village's population consisted of 51 Christian households. According to the Ottoman land-survey register (mufassal defter) of 1595, the village's population had dwindled to 25 households, all of whom were Christian. At that time, the village was affiliated with the Penek sub-district (nahiye) of the Penek liva within the "Georgian Province" (Gürcistan Vilayeti). The village cultivated wheat, barley, rye, and millet, as well as winemaking and beekeeping, and raised sheep.

Mokhrili had the same administrative position in the cece defter of Çıldır Province (Çıldır Vilayeti) covering the period 1694-1732. In 1122 AH (1709/1710), the village's revenue was 12,000 akçe and it was allocated to a person named Mustafa.

Mokhrili was ceded to Russia by the Ottoman Empire as part of the war reparations following the 1877-1878 Russo-Turkish War, following the Treaty of Berlin. The village, registered as Mukhrel (Мухрель) in the 1886 census by the Russian administration, was part of the Olti district of the Olti okrug. The village's population consisted of 16 people, 9 men and 7 women, living in 3 households. The entire population was Kurdish, from the Kaskanli tribe.
