= Olti okrug =

Coordinates: 40°32′59″N 41°59′59″E

Olti okrug Ольтинский округ
- Okrug
- Coat of arms

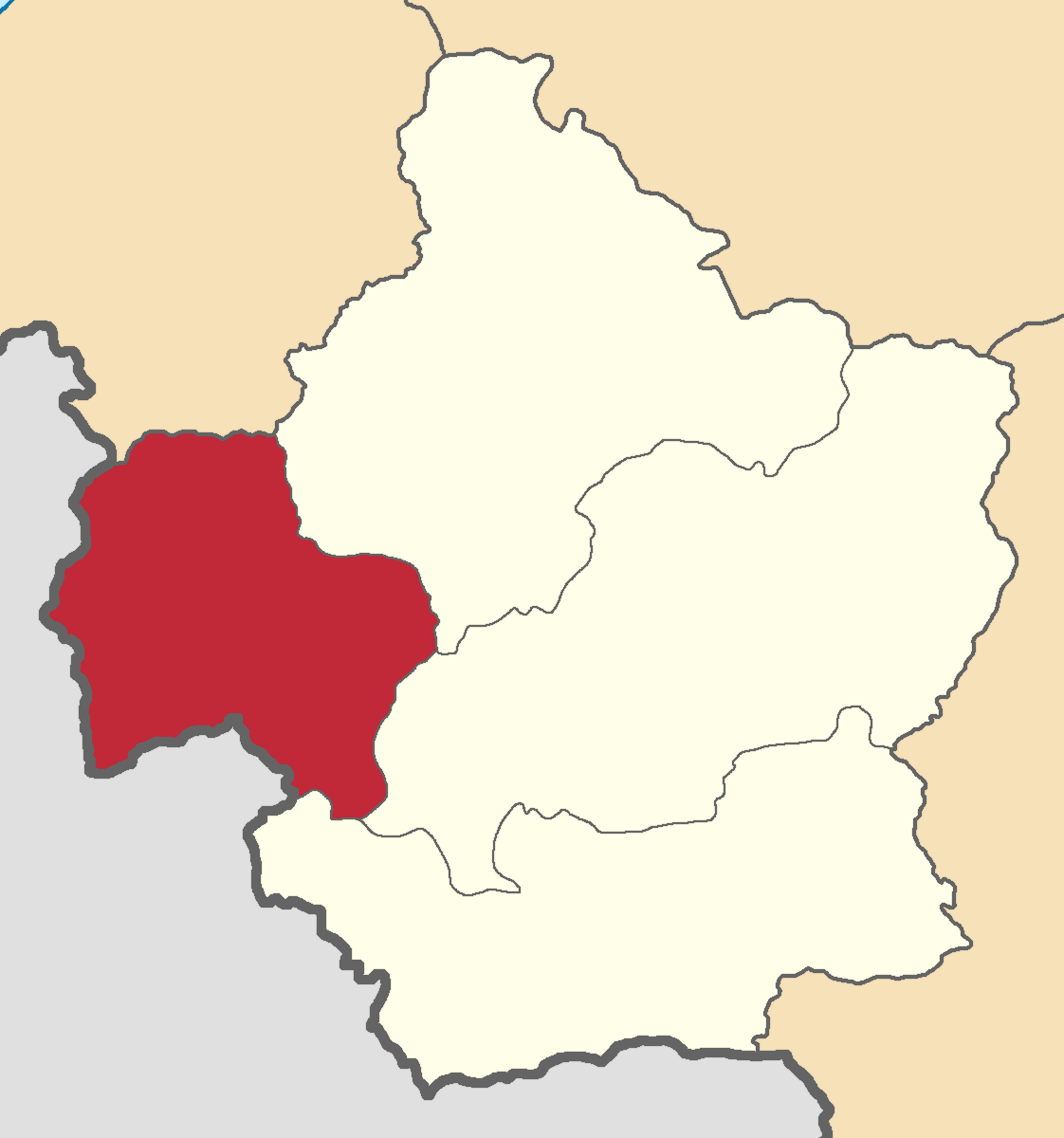
- Location in the Kars Oblast
- Country: Russian Empire
- Viceroyalty: Caucasus
- Oblast: Kars
- Established: 1878
- Treaty of Brest-Litovsk: 3 March 1918
- Capital: Olty (present-day Oltu)

Area
  - Total: 2,983.17 km^{2} (1,151.81 sq mi)

Population (1914)
  - Total: 40,091
  - Density: 13.439/km^{2} (34.807/sq mi)
  - Urban: 8.13%
  - Rural: 91.87%

The Olti okrug (Note: Russian: Ольтинский округ, pre-reform orthography: Ольтинскій округъ, romanized: Oltinskiy okrug [ɐlʲtʲɪnskʲɪj ɐkrʊk]; Turkish: Oltu Okrugu [oɫtu okɾuɡu]) was a district (okrug) of the Kars Oblast of the Russian Empire existing between 1878 and 1918. Its capital was the town of Olty (present-day Oltu), presently part of the Erzurum Province of Turkey. The okrug bordered with the Kars okrug to the southeast, the Ardahan okrug to the northwest, the Kagizman okrug to its south, the Batum Oblast to the north, and the Erzurum vilayet of the Ottoman Empire to the west.

== History ==
The Olti okrug was one of the four territorial administrative subunits (counties) of the Kars Oblast created after its annexation into the Russian Empire in 1878 through the Treaty of San Stefano, following the defeat of the Ottoman Empire.

During the First World War, the Kars oblast became the site of intense battles between the Russian Caucasus Army supplemented by Armenian volunteers and the Ottoman Third Army, the latter of whom was successful in briefly occupying Ardahan on 25 December 1914 before they were dislodged in early January 1915.

On 3 March 1918, in the aftermath of the October Revolution the Russian SFSR ceded the entire Kars Oblast including the Olti okrug through the Treaty of Brest-Litovsk to the Ottoman Empire, who had been unreconciled with its loss of the territory since 1878. Despite the ineffectual resistance of the Transcaucasian Democratic Federative Republic which had initially rejected the aforementioned treaty, the Ottoman Third Army was successful in occupying the Kars Oblast and forcefully expelling its 100,000 panic-stricken Armenian inhabitants.

The Ottoman Ninth Army under the command of Yakub Shevki Pasha, the occupying force of the district by the time of the Mudros Armistice, were permitted to winter in Kars until early 1919, after which on 7 January 1919 Major General G.T. Forestier-Walker ordered their complete withdrawal to the pre-1914 Ottoman-frontier. Intended to hinder the westward expansion of the fledgling Armenian and Georgian republics into the Kars Oblast, Yukub Shevki backed the emergence of the short-lived South-West Caucasus Republic with moral support, also furnishing it with weapons, ammunition and instructors.

The South-West Caucasus Republic administered the Olti okrug and neighboring formerly occupied districts for three months before provoking British intervention by order of General G.F. Milne, leading to its capitulation by Armenian and British forces on 10 April 1919. Consequently, the Kars Oblast largely came under the Armenian civil governorship of Stepan Korganian who wasted no time in facilitating the repatriation of the region's exiled refugees.

Despite the apparent defeat of the Ottoman Empire, Turkish agitators were reported by Armenian intelligence to have been freely roaming the countryside of Kars encouraging sedition among the Muslim villages, culminating in a series of anti-Armenian uprisings on 1 July 1919.

The Kars Oblast for the third time in six years saw invading Turkish troops, this time under the command of General Kâzım Karabekir in September 1920 during the Turkish-Armenian War. The disastrous war for Armenia resulted in the permanent expulsion of the region's ethnic Armenian population, many who inexorably remained befalling massacre, resulting in the region joining the Republic of Turkey through the Treaty of Alexandropol on 3 December 1920. Turkey's annexation of Kars and the adjacent Surmalu Uyezd was confirmed in the treaties of Kars and Moscow in 1921, by virtue of the new Soviet regime in Armenia.

== Administrative divisions ==
The prefectures (участки, uchastki) of the Olti okrug were:

Name	Administrative centre	1912 population	Area
Oltinskiy prefecture (Ольтинский участок)	Olty (Oltu)	10,874	1,888.85 square versts (2,149.63 km^{2}; 829.98 mi^{2})
Tauskerskiy prefecture (Таускерский участок)	Olor (Olur)	6,400	732.42 square versts (833.54 km^{2}; 321.83 mi^{2})

== Demographics ==
=== Russian Empire Census ===
According to the Russian Empire Census, the Olti okrug had a population of 31,519 on 28 January [O.S. 15 January] 1897, including 16,845 men and 14,674 women. The majority of the population indicated Turkish to be their mother tongue, with significant Kurdish, Armenian, and Greek speaking minorities.

Linguistic composition of the Olti okrug in 1897
Language	Native speakers	%
Turkish	19,719	62.56
Kurdish	3,505	11.12
Armenian	3,125	9.91
Greek	2,704	8.58
Turkmen	999	3.17
Russian	870	2.76
Ukrainian	168	0.53
Ossetian	62	0.20
Polish	48	0.15
Persian	44	0.14
Georgian	20	0.06
Avar-Andean	11	0.03
Dargin	8	0.03
German	7	0.02
Tatar (Note: Before 1918, Azerbaijanis were generally known as "Tatars". This term, employed by the Russians, referred to Turkic-speaking Muslims of the South Caucasus. After 1918, with the establishment of the Azerbaijan Democratic Republic and "especially during the Soviet era", the Tatar group identified itself as "Azerbaijani".)	4	0.01
Karapapakh	1	0.00
Other	224	0.71
TOTAL	31,519	100.00

=== Kavkazskiy kalendar ===
According to the 1915 publication of Kavkazskiy kalendar, the Olti okrug had a population of 40,091 on 14 January [O.S. 1 January] 1914, including 20,540 men and 19,551 women, 37,553 of whom were the permanent population, and 2,538 were temporary residents. The statistics indicated the town Olti to be overwhelmingly ethnic Armenian in population with a sizeable Yazidi minority, conversely, the rest of the okrug was mainly Yazidi, with sizeable Kurdish, Georgian, Asiatic Christian, and Armenian minorities:

Nationality	Urban		Rural		TOTAL	
Nationality	Number	%	Number	%	Number	%
Yazidis	458	14.06	21,309	57.85	21,767 [sic]	54.29
Kurds	51	1.57	5,128	13.92	5,179	12.92
Armenians	2,188	67.16	2,765	7.51	4,953	12.35
Georgians	78	2.39	4,017	10.91	4,095 [sic]	10.21
Asiatic Christians	0	0.00	3,454	9.38	3,454	8.62
Russians	177	5.43	24	0.07	201	0.50
Roma	134	4.11	0	0.00	134	0.33
North Caucasians	63	1.93	61	0.17	124	0.31
Jews	0	0.00	72	0.20	72	0.18
Shia Muslims (Note: Primarily Tatars.)	58	1.78	3	0.01	61	0.15
Sunni Muslims (Note: Primarily Turco-Tatars.)	51	1.57	0	0.00	51 [sic]	0.13
TOTAL	3,258	100.00	36,833	100.00	40,091	100.00

Comparing with previous years' statistics and considering that the district was predominantly Turkish-majority, it is likely that the 1915 publication of the Caucasian Calendar, mistakenly put the number of Sunni Muslims (mainly Turks) in the Yazidis column. The large number of Georgians compared with previous years is also exceptional and likely to be another printing error.

== Settlements ==
According to the 1897 census, there were 10 settlements in the Olti okrug with a population over 500 inhabitants. The religious composition of the settlements was as follows:

Name	Armenian Apostolic	Muslim	Eastern Orthodox	Male	Female	TOTAL
Gaziler (Бардус (Бардуз), Bardus (Barduz))			519	280	260	540
Ormanağzı (Каранаваз (Карнаваз), Karanavaz (Karnavaz))		799		401	400	801
Nişantaşı (Кейванк, Keyvank)		499		270	229	499
Ünlükaya (Нариман (Нориман Греческое), Nariman (Noriman Grecheskoye))			497	267	239	506
Oltu (Ольты, Olty)	1,056 (Note: Includes Armenian Catholics.)	405	841	1,633	740	2,373
Atlı (Ори, Ori)		783		394	389	783
Şenkaya (Ортули (Ортулу), Ortuli (Ortulu))		627		335	297	632
Yukarıkaracasu (Панаскерт Верхний, Panaskert Verkhniy)		516		269	247	516
Aşağıkaracasu (Панаскерт Нижний, Panaskert Nizhniy)		764		406	358	764
Çataksu (Таускер (Тавискар), Tausker (Taviskar))		694		379	315	694
TOTAL	1,056	5,087	1,857	4,634	3,474	8,108

== Bibliography ==
- Bournoutian, George A. (2018). Armenia and Imperial Decline: The Yerevan Province, 1900–1914. Milton Park, Abingdon, Oxon: Routledge. ISBN 978-1-351-06260-2. OCLC 1037283914.
- Hovannisian, Richard G. (1971). The Republic of Armenia. Vol. 1: The First Year, 1918–1919. Berkeley: University of California Press. ISBN 978-0520019843.
- Кавказский календарь на 1913 год [Caucasian calendar for 1913] (in Russian) (68th ed.). Tiflis: Tipografiya kantselyarii Ye.I.V. na Kavkaze, kazenny dom. 1913. Archived from the original on 19 April 2022.
- Кавказский календарь на 1915 год [Caucasian calendar for 1915] (in Russian) (70th ed.). Tiflis: Tipografiya kantselyarii Ye.I.V. na Kavkaze, kazenny dom. 1915. Archived from the original on 4 November 2021.
- Кавказский календарь на 1917 год [Caucasian calendar for 1917] (in Russian) (72nd ed.). Tiflis: Tipografiya kantselyarii Ye.I.V. na Kavkaze, kazenny dom. 1917. Archived from the original on 4 November 2021.
- Tsutsiev, Arthur (2014). Atlas of the Ethno-Political History of the Caucasus (PDF). Translated by Nora Seligman Favorov. New Haven: Yale University Press. ISBN 9780300153088. Archived (PDF) from the original on 17 June 2023.
