= Yünören, Şenkaya =

Yünören is a neighbourhood in district of Şenkaya, Erzurum Province in Turkey.

== History ==
The old name of Yünören is Karglukhi. In the note written in the 10th-century Georgian manuscript Jruchi I Gospel (ჯრუჭის I ოთხთავი), the name of this settlement is mentioned as Karglukhi (კარგლუხი). Kargluhi was recorded as Karglukh (كاركلوخ) in the Ottoman land-survey register (mufassal defter) of 1595.

Karglukhi is located in Tao, one of the regions that formed Georgia in the Middle Ages. Indeed, the Ottomans seized this region and the village from the Georgians in the 16th century. The churches known to exist in the village must have been built during this period.

According to the Ottoman land-survey register (mufassal defter) of 1595, Karglukhi was part of the Penek sub-district (nahiye) of the Penek liva within the "Georgian Province" (Gürcistan Vilayeti). At that time, the village consisted of 24 Christian households. Wheat, barley, millet, and rye were cultivated in the village, along with winemaking and beekeeping, and pig and sheep were raised.

Karglukhi held the same administrative position as the Çıldır province's cebe defter, covering the period 1694-1732. In 1116 AH (1704/1705), the revenue of the village was 24,998 akçe and it was given to a man named Mehmed as a zeamet.

Karglukhi was ceded to Russia by the Ottoman Empire as part of the war reparations following the Russo-Turkish War of 1877-1878, following the Treaty of Berlin signed in 1878. The village, recorded as Kyarkalug (Кяркалугъ) by the Russian administration in the 1886 census, was part of the Olti okrug of the Oltu district (uchastok). Its population consisted of 43 people, 25 male and 18 female, living in eight households. Of this population, 30 were Kurdish and 15 were Turkish.

Georgian historian and archaeologist Ekvtime Takaishvili visited the village in 1907 and wrote that the locals called it "Karkluk," that there were two churches, and that Muslims lived there. The smaller of these churches was used as a mosque at the time. The interior walls of the church, which was used as a mosque, were plastered. There were Armenian inscriptions scratched on the walls from a later period. These inscriptions suggest that the church was used by Armenians before being converted into a mosque. This church was later demolished, and the village mosque was built on its site.
