= Alıcık =

Alıcık can refer to:

- Alıcık, Merzifon
- Alıcık, Şenkaya
