= Alatarla =

Alatarla can refer to:

- Alatarla, Elâzığ
- Alatarla, Oltu
