= Dörtyol (disambiguation) =

Dörtyol is a port city in Hatay Province, Turkey.

Dörtyol (literally "four roads") is a Turkish place name that may refer to the following places in Turkey:

- Dörtyol, Besni, a village in the district of Besni, Adıyaman Province
- Dörtyol, Şenkaya
- Dörtyol, Taşova, a village in the district of Taşova, Amasya Province
