= Erdoğmuş =

Erdoğmuş may refer to:

- Nimetullah Erdoğmuş (born 1960), Turkish politician
- Yağız Kaan Erdoğmuş (born 2011), Turkish chess grandmaster
- Erdoğmuş, Oltu, a neighbourhood in the municipality and district of Oltu, Erzurum Province in Turkey
