= Atyolu, Şenkaya =

Village in Turkey

Atyolu
- Neighbourhood
- Location in Turkey
- Coordinates: 40.7507°N 42.4215°E
- Country: Turkey
- Province: Erzurum
- District: Şenkaya
- Population (2022): 403
- Time zone: UTC+3 (TRT)

Atyolu is a neighbourhood in the municipality and district of Şenkaya, Erzurum Province in Turkey. Its population is 403 (2022).
