= Tutlu, Oltu =

Village in Turkey

Tutlu
- Neighbourhood
- Location in Turkey
- Coordinates: 40°38′27″N 42°03′39″E
- Country: Turkey
- Province: Erzurum
- District: Oltu
- Population (2022): 429
- Time zone: UTC+3 (TRT)

Tutlu is a neighbourhood in the municipality and district of Oltu, Erzurum Province in Turkey. Its population is 429 (2022).
