= Sülünkaya, Oltu =

Village in Turkey

Sülünkaya
- Neighbourhood
- Location in Turkey
- Coordinates: 40°42′N 41°57′E
- Country: Turkey
- Province: Erzurum
- District: Oltu
- Population (2022): 130
- Time zone: UTC+3 (TRT)

Sülünkaya is a neighbourhood in the municipality and district of Oltu, Erzurum Province in Turkey. Its population is 130 (2022).
