= Kaleboğazı, Oltu =

Village in Turkey

Kaleboğazı
- Neighbourhood
- Location within Turkey
- Coordinates: 40.5225°N 41.899167°E
- Country: Turkey
- Province: Erzurum
- District: Oltu
- Population (2022): 202
- Time zone: UTC+3 (TRT)

Kaleboğazı is a neighbourhood in the municipality and district of Oltu, Erzurum Province in Turkey. As of 2022, its population is 202.
