= Göreşken, Şenkaya =

Village in Turkey

Göreşken
- Neighbourhood
- Location in Turkey
- Coordinates: 40°26′18″N 42°23′00″E
- Country: Turkey
- Province: Erzurum
- District: Şenkaya
- Population (2022): 161
- Time zone: UTC+3 (TRT)

Göreşken is a neighbourhood in the municipality and district of Şenkaya, Erzurum Province in Turkey. Its population is 161 (2022).
