= Aşağıkumlu, Oltu =

Village in Turkey

Aşağıkumlu
- Neighbourhood
- Location in Turkey
- Coordinates: 40°38′N 42°09′E
- Country: Turkey
- Province: Erzurum
- District: Oltu
- Population (2022): 122
- Time zone: UTC+3 (TRT)

Aşağıkumlu is a neighbourhood in the municipality and district of Oltu, Erzurum Province in Turkey. Its population is 122 (2022).
