= Konukseven, Oltu =

Village in Turkey

Konukseven
- Neighbourhood
- Location in Turkey
- Coordinates: 40°29′23″N 42°07′28″E
- Country: Turkey
- Province: Erzurum
- District: Oltu
- Population (2022): 34
- Time zone: UTC+3 (TRT)

Konukseven is a neighbourhood in the municipality and district of Oltu, Erzurum Province in Turkey. Its population is 34 (2022).
