= Çengelli, Oltu =

Village in Turkey

Çengelli
- Neighbourhood
- Country: Turkey
- Province: Erzurum
- District: Oltu
- Population (2022): 158
- Time zone: UTC+3 (TRT)

Çengelli is a neighbourhood in the municipality and district of Oltu, Erzurum Province in Turkey. Its population is 158 (2022).
