= Çatalelma, Şenkaya =

Village in Turkey

Çatalelma
- Neighbourhood
- Country: Turkey
- Province: Erzurum
- District: Şenkaya
- Population (2022): 126
- Time zone: UTC+3 (TRT)

Çatalelma is a neighbourhood in the municipality and district of Şenkaya, Erzurum Province in Turkey. Its population is 126 (2022).

Babos, formerly a separate village, is now a hamlet of Çatalelma.
