= İçmesu, Şenkaya =

Village in Turkey

İçmesu
- Neighbourhood
- Location in Turkey
- Coordinates: 40°25′17″N 42°18′30″E
- Country: Turkey
- Province: Erzurum
- District: Şenkaya
- Population (2022): 48
- Time zone: UTC+3 (TRT)

İçmesu is a neighbourhood in the municipality and district of Şenkaya, Erzurum Province in Turkey.

== Demographics ==
Its population is 48 (2022).
