= Akbayır, Olur =

Village in Turkey

Akbayır
- Neighbourhood
- Location in Turkey
- Coordinates: 40.8285°N 42.0428°E
- Country: Turkey
- Province: Erzurum
- District: Olur
- Population (2022): 29
- Time zone: UTC+3 (TRT)

Akbayır is a neighbourhood in the municipality and district of Olur, Erzurum Province in Turkey. Its population is 29 (2022).

== History ==
The former name of Akbayır was Kakhi or Kakhisi. The Georgian place name Kakhi or Kakhisi (კახი or კახისი) may be related to the word ‘kakhi’ (კახი), a type of wheat. On the other hand, this place name may also be related to the fact that the village's former inhabitants came from the Kakheti region of Georgia and settled there. Kakhi or Kakhisi has been written as Kakhis and Kakh (كاخ) in Turkish sources. The Russian administration recorded this settlement as Kyakh (Кяхъ) in the 1886 census. At that time, 66 people lived in 15 households in the village, 35 men and 31 women, and the entire population was recorded as 'Turk’. According to information provided by Georgian historian and archaeologist Ekvtime Takaishvili in 1907, there were 12 households in the village of ‘Kiakhi’ (კიახი), inhabited by Muslim Georgians. The small old church, dating back to the period when the Georgian inhabitants of the village were Christian, had been demolished down to its foundations by this date.
