= Beykaynak, Şenkaya =

Village in Turkey

Beykaynak
- Neighbourhood
- Location in Turkey
- Coordinates: 40.7733°N 42.2752°E
- Country: Turkey
- Province: Erzurum
- District: Şenkaya
- Population (2022): 75
- Time zone: UTC+3 (TRT)

Beykaynak is a neighbourhood in the municipality and district of Şenkaya, Erzurum Province in Turkey. Its population is 75 (2022).
