= Obayayla, Oltu =

Village in Turkey

Obayayla
- Neighbourhood
- Location in Turkey
- Coordinates: 40°30′N 42°04′E
- Country: Turkey
- Province: Erzurum
- District: Oltu
- Population (2022): 121
- Time zone: UTC+3 (TRT)

Obayayla is a neighbourhood in the municipality and district of Oltu, Erzurum Province in Turkey. Its population is 121 (2022).
