= İpekçayırı, Oltu =

Village in Turkey

İpekçayırı
- Neighbourhood
- Location in Turkey
- Coordinates: 40°28′52″N 42°08′10″E
- Country: Turkey
- Province: Erzurum
- District: Oltu
- Population (2022): 23
- Time zone: UTC+3 (TRT)

İpekçayırı is a neighbourhood in the municipality and district of Oltu, Erzurum Province in Turkey. Its population is 23 (2022).
