= Filizli, Olur =

Village in Turkey

Filizli
- Neighbourhood
- Location in Turkey
- Coordinates: 40.864167°N 42.271111°E
- Country: Turkey
- Province: Erzurum
- District: Olur
- Population (2022): 91
- Time zone: UTC+3 (TRT)

Filizli is a neighbourhood in the municipality and district of Olur, Erzurum Province in Turkey. Its population is 91 (2022).
