= Yukarıçayırlı, Olur =

Village in Turkey

Yukarıçayırlı
- Neighbourhood
- Location in Turkey
- Coordinates: 40.865833°N 42.28°E
- Country: Turkey
- Province: Erzurum
- District: Olur
- Population (2022): 92
- Time zone: UTC+3 (TRT)

Yukarıçayırlı is a neighbourhood in the municipality and district of Olur, Erzurum Province in Turkey. Its population is 92 (2022).
