= Doğanköy, Şenkaya =

Village in Turkey

Doğanköy
- Neighbourhood
- Location in Turkey
- Coordinates: 40.6021°N 42.4118°E
- Country: Turkey
- Province: Erzurum
- District: Şenkaya
- Population (2022): 88
- Time zone: UTC+3 (TRT)

Doğanköy is a neighbourhood in the municipality and district of Şenkaya, Erzurum Province in Turkey. Its population is 88 (2022).
