= Coşkunlar, Olur =

Village in Turkey

Coşkunlar
- Neighbourhood
- Location in Turkey
- Coordinates: 40.766389°N 42.176944°E
- Country: Turkey
- Province: Erzurum
- District: Olur
- Population (2022): 117
- Time zone: UTC+3 (TRT)

Coşkunlar is a neighbourhood in the municipality and district of Olur, Erzurum Province in Turkey. Its population is 117 (2022).
