= Ürünlü, Olur =

Village in Turkey

Ürünlü
- Neighbourhood
- Location in Turkey
- Coordinates: 40.876389°N 42.235°E
- Country: Turkey
- Province: Erzurum
- District: Olur
- Population (2022): 81
- Time zone: UTC+3 (TRT)

Ürünlü is a neighbourhood in the municipality and district of Olur, Erzurum Province in Turkey. Its population is 81 (2022).
