= Soğukgöze, Olur =

Village in Turkey

Soğukgöze
- Neighbourhood
- Location in Turkey
- Coordinates: 40.884722°N 42.268889°E
- Country: Turkey
- Province: Erzurum
- District: Olur
- Population (2022): 141
- Time zone: UTC+3 (TRT)

Soğukgöze is a neighbourhood in the municipality and district of Olur, Erzurum Province in Turkey. Its population is 141 (2022).
