= Şalpazarı, Olur =

Village in Turkey

Şalpazarı
- Neighbourhood
- Location in Turkey
- Coordinates: 40.854444°N 41.890833°E
- Country: Turkey
- Province: Erzurum
- District: Olur
- Population (2022): 44
- Time zone: UTC+3 (TRT)

Şalpazarı is a neighbourhood in the municipality and district of Olur, Erzurum Province in Turkey. Its population is 44 (2022).
