= Damarlıtaş, Oltu =

Village in Turkey

Damarlıtaş
- Neighbourhood
- Location in Turkey
- Coordinates: 40°24′55″N 42°01′20″E
- Country: Turkey
- Province: Erzurum
- District: Oltu
- Population (2022): 63
- Time zone: UTC+3 (TRT)

Damarlıtaş is a neighbourhood in the municipality and district of Oltu, Erzurum Province in Turkey. Its population is 63 (2022).
