= Aşağıçamlı, Oltu =

Village in Turkey

Aşağıçamlı
- Neighbourhood
- Location in Turkey
- Coordinates: 40.5460°N 42.0930°E
- Country: Turkey
- Province: Erzurum
- District: Oltu
- Population (2022): 123
- Time zone: UTC+3 (TRT)

Aşağıçamlı is a neighbourhood in the municipality and district of Oltu, Erzurum Province in Turkey. Its population is 123 (2022).
