= Yeşilbağlar, Olur =

Village in Turkey

Yeşilbağlar
- Neighbourhood
- Location in Turkey
- Coordinates: 40.778056°N 42.122778°E
- Country: Turkey
- Province: Erzurum
- District: Olur
- Population (2022): 198
- Time zone: UTC+3 (TRT)

Yeşilbağlar is a neighbourhood in the municipality and district of Olur, Erzurum Province in Turkey. Its population is 198 (2022).
