= Özdere, Oltu =

Village in Turkey

Özdere
- Neighbourhood
- Location in Turkey
- Coordinates: 40°25′00″N 41°43′42″E
- Country: Turkey
- Province: Erzurum
- District: Oltu
- Population (2022): 284
- Time zone: UTC+3 (TRT)

Özdere is a neighbourhood in the municipality and district of Oltu, Erzurum Province in Turkey. Its population is 284 (2022).
