= Sarıyar, Şenkaya =

Village in Turkey

Sarıyar
- Neighbourhood
- Country: Turkey
- Province: Erzurum
- District: Şenkaya
- Population (2022): 126
- Time zone: UTC+3 (TRT)

Sarıyar is a neighbourhood in the municipality and district of Şenkaya, Erzurum Province in Turkey. Its population is 126 (2022).
