= Toprakkale, Oltu =

Village in Turkey

Toprakkale
- Neighbourhood
- Country: Turkey
- Province: Erzurum
- District: Oltu
- Population (2022): 74
- Time zone: UTC+3 (TRT)

Toprakkale is a neighbourhood in the municipality and district of Oltu, Erzurum Province in Turkey. Its population is 74 (2022).
