= Olgun, Olur =

Village in Turkey

Olgun
- Neighbourhood
- Location in Turkey
- Coordinates: 40.871389°N 42.109444°E
- Country: Turkey
- Province: Erzurum
- District: Olur
- Population (2022): 81
- Time zone: UTC+3 (TRT)

Olgun is a neighbourhood in the municipality and district of Olur, Erzurum Province in Turkey. Its population is 81 (2022).
