= Yolgözler, Olur =

Village in Turkey

Yolgözler
- Neighbourhood
- Location in Turkey
- Coordinates: 40.793056°N 42.056667°E
- Country: Turkey
- Province: Erzurum
- District: Olur
- Population (2022): 43
- Time zone: UTC+3 (TRT)

Yolgözler is a neighbourhood in the municipality and district of Olur, Erzurum Province in Turkey. Its population is 43 (2022).
