= Elmadüzü, Oltu =

Village in Turkey

Elmadüzü
- Neighbourhood
- Country: Turkey
- Province: Erzurum
- District: Oltu
- Population (2022): 58
- Time zone: UTC+3 (TRT)

Elmadüzü is a neighbourhood in the municipality and district of Oltu, Erzurum Province in Turkey. Its population is 58 (2022).
