= Sındıran, Şenkaya =

Village in Turkey

Sındıran
- Neighbourhood
- Country: Turkey
- Province: Erzurum
- District: Şenkaya
- Population (2022): 96
- Time zone: UTC+3 (TRT)

Sındıran is a neighbourhood in the municipality and district of Şenkaya, Erzurum Province in Turkey. Its population is 96 (2022).

The historical name of Sındıran is Agaraki. Agaraki (აგარაკი), a Georgian place name, means field, village in Old Georgian. This place name entered in Turkish language as Egerek. Indeed, it appears as Egerek (اكرك) in the 1595 Ottoman land-survey register (mufassal defter) and in the 1928 Ottoman village list. Under the influence of Armenian, the name of the village was also written as "Akriyak".
