= Nüğürcük, Oltu =

Village in Turkey

Nüğürcük
- Neighbourhood
- Location in Turkey
- Coordinates: 40°25′45″N 42°08′20″E
- Country: Turkey
- Province: Erzurum
- District: Oltu
- Population (2022): 130
- Time zone: UTC+3 (TRT)

Nüğürcük is a neighbourhood in the municipality and district of Oltu, Erzurum Province in Turkey. Its population is 130 (2022).
