= Duralar, Oltu =

Village in Turkey

Duralar
- Neighbourhood
- Location in Turkey
- Coordinates: 40°28′N 41°55′E
- Country: Turkey
- Province: Erzurum
- District: Oltu
- Population (2022): 56
- Time zone: UTC+3 (TRT)

Duralar is a neighbourhood in the municipality and district of Oltu, Erzurum Province in Turkey. Its population is 56 (2022).
