= Süngübayır, Olur =

Village in Turkey

Süngübayır
- Neighbourhood
- Location in Turkey
- Coordinates: 40°53′24″N 42°05′46″E
- Country: Turkey
- Province: Erzurum
- District: Olur
- Population (2022): 40
- Time zone: UTC+3 (TRT)

Süngübayır is a neighbourhood in the municipality and district of Olur, Erzurum Province in Turkey. Its population is 40 (2022).
