= Köprübaşı, Olur =

Village in Turkey

Köprübaşı
- Neighbourhood
- Location in Turkey
- Coordinates: 40.777222°N 42.136944°E
- Country: Turkey
- Province: Erzurum
- District: Olur
- Population (2022): 95
- Time zone: UTC+3 (TRT)

Köprübaşı is a neighbourhood in the municipality and district of Olur, Erzurum Province in Turkey. Its population is 95 (2022).
