= Aydoğdu, Şenkaya =

Village in Turkey

Aydoğdu
- Neighbourhood
- Location in Turkey
- Coordinates: 40.701°N 42.471°E
- Country: Turkey
- Province: Erzurum
- District: Şenkaya
- Population (2022): 113
- Time zone: UTC+3 (TRT)

Aydoğdu is a neighbourhood in the municipality and district of Şenkaya, Erzurum Province in Turkey. Its population is 113 (2022).
