= Kaynak, Şenkaya =

Village in Turkey

Kaynak
- Neighbourhood
- Country: Turkey
- Province: Erzurum
- District: Şenkaya
- Population (2022): 164
- Time zone: UTC+3 (TRT)

Kaynak is a neighbourhood in the municipality and district of Şenkaya, Erzurum Province in Turkey. Its population is 164 (2022).
