= Değirmenlidere, Şenkaya =

Village in Turkey

Değirmenlidere
- Neighbourhood
- Location in Turkey
- Coordinates: 40°44′N 42°32′E
- Country: Turkey
- Province: Erzurum
- District: Şenkaya
- Population (2022): 491
- Time zone: UTC+3 (TRT)

Değirmenlidere is a neighbourhood in the municipality and district of Şenkaya, Erzurum Province in Turkey. Its population is 491 (2022).
