= Çanakpınar, Oltu =

Village in Turkey

Çanakpınar
- Neighbourhood
- Location in Turkey
- Coordinates: 40.6645°N 41.8657°E
- Country: Turkey
- Province: Erzurum
- District: Oltu
- Population (2022): 84
- Time zone: UTC+3 (TRT)

Çanakpınar is a neighbourhood in the municipality and district of Oltu, Erzurum Province in Turkey. Its population is 84 (2022).
