= Güryaprak, Oltu =

Village in Turkey

Güryaprak
- Neighbourhood
- Location in Turkey
- Coordinates: 40°41′N 41°54′E
- Country: Turkey
- Province: Erzurum
- District: Oltu
- Population (2022): 79
- Time zone: UTC+3 (TRT)

Güryaprak is a neighbourhood in the municipality and district of Oltu, Erzurum Province in Turkey. Its population is 79 (2022).
