= Ballıca, Oltu =

Village in Turkey

Ballıca
- Neighbourhood
- Location in Turkey
- Coordinates: 40.5093°N 41.8570°E
- Country: Turkey
- Province: Erzurum
- District: Oltu
- Population (2022): 108
- Time zone: UTC+3 (TRT)

Ballıca is a neighbourhood in the municipality and district of Oltu, Erzurum Province in Turkey. Its population is 108 (2022).
