= Beşkaya, Olur =

Village in Turkey

Beşkaya
- Neighbourhood
- Location in Turkey
- Coordinates: 40.8492°N 41.9670°E
- Country: Turkey
- Province: Erzurum
- District: Olur
- Population (2022): 79
- Time zone: UTC+3 (TRT)

Beşkaya is a neighbourhood in the municipality and district of Olur, Erzurum Province in Turkey. Its population is 79 (2022).
