= Dokuzdeğirmen, Oltu =

Village in Turkey

Dokuzdeğirmen
- Neighbourhood
- Location in Turkey
- Coordinates: 40.430278°N 42.128333°E
- Country: Turkey
- Province: Erzurum
- District: Oltu
- Population (2022): 37
- Time zone: UTC+3 (TRT)

Dokuzdeğirmen is a neighbourhood in the municipality and district of Oltu, Erzurum Province in Turkey. Its population is 37 (2022).
