= Söğütler, Şenkaya =

Village in Turkey

Söğütler
- Neighbourhood
- Location in Turkey
- Coordinates: 40°41′N 42°19′E
- Country: Turkey
- Province: Erzurum
- District: Şenkaya
- Population (2022): 335
- Time zone: UTC+3 (TRT)

Söğütler is a neighbourhood in the municipality and district of Şenkaya, Erzurum Province in Turkey. Its population is 335 (2022).
