= Ilıkaynak, Olur =

Village in Turkey

Ilıkaynak
- Neighbourhood
- Location in Turkey
- Coordinates: 40.866389°N 42.139722°E
- Country: Turkey
- Province: Erzurum
- District: Olur
- Population (2022): 86
- Time zone: UTC+3 (TRT)

Ilıkaynak is a neighbourhood in the municipality and district of Olur, Erzurum Province in Turkey. Its population is 86 (2022).
