= Orucuk, Oltu =

Village in Turkey

Orucuk
- Neighbourhood
- Location in Turkey
- Coordinates: 40°31′N 41°48′E
- Country: Turkey
- Province: Erzurum
- District: Oltu
- Population (2022): 258
- Time zone: UTC+3 (TRT)

Orucuk is a neighbourhood in the municipality and district of Oltu, Erzurum Province in Turkey. Its population is 258 (2022).
