= Bozdoğan, Olur =

Village in Turkey

Bozdoğan
- Neighbourhood
- Location in Turkey
- Coordinates: 40.8816°N 42.0849°E
- Country: Turkey
- Province: Erzurum
- District: Olur
- Population (2022): 33
- Time zone: UTC+3 (TRT)

Bozdoğan is a neighbourhood in the municipality and district of Olur, Erzurum Province in Turkey. Its population is 33 (2022).
