= Ayyıldız, Oltu =

Village in Turkey

Ayyıldız
- Neighbourhood
- Location in Turkey
- Coordinates: 40.4358°N 42.0657°E
- Country: Turkey
- Province: Erzurum
- District: Oltu
- Population (2022): 117
- Time zone: UTC+3 (TRT)

Ayyıldız is a neighbourhood in the municipality and district of Oltu, Erzurum Province in Turkey. Its population is 117 (2022).

The historical name of Ayyıldız is Petkiri or Pitkiri. Petkiri (ფეთქირი) and Pitkiri (ფითქირი) were written as Pitkir (پیتكر) in the Çıldır Province cebe defter (1694-1732) and as Petkir (پتكر) in the Ottoman village list of 1928.

The Petkiri Church, which is largely in ruins, is located 3 kilometers east of the village center.
