= Kekikli, Olur =

Village in Turkey

Kekikli
- Neighbourhood
- Location in Turkey
- Coordinates: 40°57′N 41°59′E
- Country: Turkey
- Province: Erzurum
- District: Olur
- Population (2022): 112
- Time zone: UTC+3 (TRT)

Kekikli is a neighbourhood in the municipality and district of Olur, Erzurum Province in Turkey. Its population is 112 (2022).
