= Aşağıçayırlı, Olur =

Village in Turkey

Aşağıçayırlı
- Neighbourhood
- Location in Turkey
- Coordinates: 40°52′36″N 42°16′44″E
- Country: Turkey
- Province: Erzurum
- District: Olur
- Population (2022): 166
- Time zone: UTC+3 (TRT)

Aşağıçayırlı is a neighbourhood in the municipality and district of Olur, Erzurum Province in Turkey. Its population is 166 (2022).
