= Sağlıcak, Oltu =

Village in Turkey

Sağlıcak
- Neighbourhood
- Location in Turkey
- Coordinates: 40°41′37″N 42°09′56″E
- Country: Turkey
- Province: Erzurum
- District: Oltu
- Population (2022): 74
- Time zone: UTC+3 (TRT)

Sağlıcak is a neighbourhood in the municipality and district of Oltu, Erzurum Province in Turkey. Its population is 74 (2022).
