= Küçükorucuk, Oltu =

Village in Turkey

Küçükorucuk
- Neighbourhood
- Country: Turkey
- Province: Erzurum
- District: Oltu
- Population (2022): 91
- Time zone: UTC+3 (TRT)

Küçükorucuk is a neighbourhood in the municipality and district of Oltu, Erzurum Province in Turkey. Its population is 91 (2022).
