= Vişneli, Oltu =

Village in Turkey

Vişneli
- Neighbourhood
- Country: Turkey
- Province: Erzurum
- District: Oltu
- Population (2022): 132
- Time zone: UTC+3 (TRT)

Vişneli is a neighbourhood in the municipality and district of Oltu, Erzurum Province, Turkey. Its population is 132 (2022).
