= Zümrüt, Şenkaya =

Coordinates: 40°33′04″N 42°13′24″E

Zümrüt is a neighbourhood in the municipality and district of Şenkaya, Erzurum Province in Turkey.

The settlement of Bobisgeri (ბობისგერი), a historically Georgian village, is within the boundaries of the village of Zümrüt. The church of this village, Bobisgeri Church, was completely demolished and its stones were used in the construction of houses.
