= Hükkam, Olur =

Village in Turkey

Hükkam
- Neighbourhood
- Location in Turkey
- Coordinates: 40°44′46″N 41°58′47″E
- Country: Turkey
- Province: Erzurum
- District: Olur
- Population (2022): 212
- Time zone: UTC+3 (TRT)

Hükkam (formerly: Taşlıköy) is a neighbourhood in the municipality and district of Olur, Erzurum Province in Turkey. Its population is 212 (2022).
