= Tutmaç, Oltu =

Village in Turkey

Tutmaç
- Neighbourhood
- Country: Turkey
- Province: Erzurum
- District: Oltu
- Population (2022): 233
- Time zone: UTC+3 (TRT)

Tutmaç is a neighbourhood in the municipality and district of Oltu, Erzurum Province in Turkey. Its population is 233 (2022).
