= Akşar, Şenkaya =

Village in Turkey

Akşar
- Neighbourhood
- Location in Turkey
- Coordinates: 40.6500°N 42.3482°E
- Country: Turkey
- Province: Erzurum
- District: Şenkaya
- Population (2022): 1,258
- Time zone: UTC+3 (TRT)

Akşar is a neighbourhood in the municipality and district of Şenkaya, Erzurum Province in Turkey. Its population is 1,258 (2022).

Akşar's former name was Kosori. Kosori (Georgian: კოსორი) means “steep rock” in Georgian. This place name is written as "Kosor" (قوصور) in the Ottoman land-survey register (mufassal defter) of 1595.
