= Tuzlaköy, Oltu =

Village in Turkey

Tuzlaköy
- Neighbourhood
- Location in Turkey
- Coordinates: 40°39′05″N 42°08′32″E
- Country: Turkey
- Province: Erzurum
- District: Oltu
- Population (2022): 223
- Time zone: UTC+3 (TRT)

Tuzlaköy is a neighbourhood in the municipality and district of Oltu, Erzurum Province in Turkey. Its population is 223 (2022).
