= Deliktaş, Şenkaya =

Village in Turkey

Deliktaş
- Neighbourhood
- Country: Turkey
- Province: Erzurum
- District: Şenkaya
- Population (2022): 129
- Time zone: UTC+3 (TRT)

Deliktaş is a neighbourhood in the municipality and district of Şenkaya, Erzurum Province in Turkey. Its population is 129 (2022).
