= Şendurak, Oltu =

Village in Turkey

Şendurak
- Neighbourhood
- Country: Turkey
- Province: Erzurum
- District: Oltu
- Population (2022): 107
- Time zone: UTC+3 (TRT)

Şendurak is a neighbourhood in the municipality and district of Oltu, Erzurum Province in Turkey. Its population is 107 (2022).
