= Yukarıkumlu, Oltu =

Village in Turkey

Yukarıkumlu
- Neighbourhood
- Location in Turkey
- Coordinates: 40°37′09″N 42°08′18″E
- Country: Turkey
- Province: Erzurum
- District: Oltu
- Population (2022): 62
- Time zone: UTC+3 (TRT)

Yukarıkumlu is a neighbourhood in the municipality and district of Oltu, Erzurum Province in Turkey. Its population is 62 (2022).
