= Bereketli, Şenkaya =

Village in Turkey

Bereketli
- Neighbourhood
- Location in Turkey
- Coordinates: 40.4455°N 42.2691°E
- Country: Turkey
- Province: Erzurum
- District: Şenkaya
- Population (2022): 50
- Time zone: UTC+3 (TRT)

Bereketli is a neighbourhood in the municipality and district of Şenkaya, Erzurum Province in Turkey. Its population is 50 (2022).
