= Balkaya, Şenkaya =

Village in Turkey

Balkaya
- Neighbourhood
- Location in Turkey
- Coordinates: 40.7412°N 42.2633°E
- Country: Turkey
- Province: Erzurum
- District: Şenkaya
- Population (2022): 201
- Time zone: UTC+3 (TRT)

Balkaya is a neighbourhood in the municipality and district of Şenkaya, Erzurum Province in Turkey. Its population is 201 (2022).
