= Yaylaçayır, Oltu =

Village in Turkey

Yaylaçayır
- Neighbourhood
- Country: Turkey
- Province: Erzurum
- District: Oltu
- Population (2022): 69
- Time zone: UTC+3 (TRT)

Yaylaçayır is a neighbourhood in the municipality and district of Oltu, Erzurum Province in Turkey. Its population is 69 (2022).
