= Bahçecik, Oltu =

Village in Turkey

Bahçecik
- Neighbourhood
- Location in Turkey
- Coordinates: 40.5422°N 42.0559°E
- Country: Turkey
- Province: Erzurum
- District: Oltu
- Population (2022): 129
- Time zone: UTC+3 (TRT)

Bahçecik is a neighbourhood in the municipality and district of Oltu, Erzurum Province in Turkey. Its population is 129 (2022).
