= Ayvalı, Oltu =

Village in Turkey

Ayvalı
- Neighbourhood
- Location in Turkey
- Coordinates: 40.7513°N 41.8765°E
- Country: Turkey
- Province: Erzurum
- District: Oltu
- Population (2022): 791
- Time zone: UTC+3 (TRT)

Ayvalı is a neighbourhood in the municipality and district of Oltu, Erzurum Province in Turkey. Its population is 791 (2022).
