= Esenyurt, Şenkaya =

Village in Turkey

Esenyurt
- Neighbourhood
- Country: Turkey
- Province: Erzurum
- District: Şenkaya
- Population (2022): 169
- Time zone: UTC+3 (TRT)

Esenyurt is a neighbourhood in the municipality and district of Şenkaya, Erzurum Province in Turkey. Its population is 169 (2022).
