= Olurdere, Olur =

Village in Turkey

Olurdere
- Neighbourhood
- Location in Turkey
- Coordinates: 40.806944°N 42.1625°E
- Country: Turkey
- Province: Erzurum
- District: Olur
- Population (2022): 71
- Time zone: UTC+3 (TRT)

Olurdere is a neighbourhood in the municipality and district of Olur, Erzurum Province in Turkey. Its population is 71 (2022).
