= Keçili, Olur =

Village in Turkey

Keçili
- Neighbourhood
- Location in Turkey
- Coordinates: 40.886944°N 41.959167°E
- Country: Turkey
- Province: Erzurum
- District: Olur
- Population (2022): 24
- Time zone: UTC+3 (TRT)

Keçili is a neighbourhood in the municipality and district of Olur, Erzurum Province in Turkey. Its population is 24 (2022).
