= Sarısaz, Oltu =

Village in Turkey

Sarısaz
- Neighbourhood
- Location in Turkey
- Coordinates: 40°31′44″N 41°55′36″E
- Country: Turkey
- Province: Erzurum
- District: Oltu
- Population (2022): 136
- Time zone: UTC+3 (TRT)

Sarısaz is a neighbourhood in the municipality and district of Oltu, Erzurum Province in Turkey. Its population is 136 (2022).

The settlement area of Tezonisi, a vanished village, is within the borders of Sarısaz village.
