= Başaklı, Oltu =

Village in Turkey

Başaklı
- Neighbourhood
- Location in Turkey
- Coordinates: 40.4574°N 41.8001°E
- Country: Turkey
- Province: Erzurum
- District: Oltu
- Population (2022): 347
- Time zone: UTC+3 (TRT)

Başaklı is a neighbourhood in the municipality and district of Oltu, Erzurum Province in Turkey. Its population is 347 (2022).
