= Dokuzelma, Şenkaya =

Village in Turkey

Dokuzelma
- Neighbourhood
- Location in Turkey
- Coordinates: 40°44′36″N 42°23′24″E
- Country: Turkey
- Province: Erzurum
- District: Şenkaya
- Population (2022): 24
- Time zone: UTC+3 (TRT)

Dokuzelma is a neighbourhood in the municipality and district of Şenkaya, Erzurum Province in Turkey. Its population is 24 (2022).
