= Kaledibi, Olur =

Village in Turkey

Kaledibi
- Neighbourhood
- Location in Turkey
- Coordinates: 40.7246°N 42.1765°E
- Country: Turkey
- Province: Erzurum
- District: Olur
- Population (2022): 179
- Time zone: UTC+3 (TRT)

Kaledibi is a neighbourhood in the municipality and district of Olur, Erzurum Province in Turkey. Its population is 179 (2022).
