= İnanmış, Oltu =

Village in Turkey

İnanmış
- Neighbourhood
- Location in Turkey
- Coordinates: 40°28′23″N 41°42′17″E
- Country: Turkey
- Province: Erzurum
- District: Oltu
- Population (2022): 133
- Time zone: UTC+3 (TRT)

İnanmış is a neighbourhood in the municipality and district of Oltu, Erzurum Province in Turkey. Its population is 133 (2022).
