= Gözalan, Şenkaya =

Village in Turkey

Gözalan
- Neighbourhood
- Location in Turkey
- Coordinates: 40°38′27″N 42°15′41″E
- Country: Turkey
- Province: Erzurum
- District: Şenkaya
- Population (2022): 245
- Time zone: UTC+3 (TRT)

Gözalan is a neighbourhood in the municipality and district of Şenkaya, Erzurum Province in Turkey. Its population is 245 (2022).
