= Sarıbaşak, Olur =

Village in Turkey

Sarıbaşak
- Neighbourhood
- Location in Turkey
- Coordinates: 40.878611°N 42.127222°E
- Country: Turkey
- Province: Erzurum
- District: Olur
- Population (2022): 24
- Time zone: UTC+3 (TRT)

Sarıbaşak is a neighbourhood in the municipality and district of Olur, Erzurum Province in Turkey. Its population is 24 (2022).

The former name of Sarıbaşak is Khainisi. Khainisi (ხაინისი) is a place name ending with a Georgian suffix. This place name is written as Khaynis (خاینس) in the 1835 Ottoman census register and in an Ottoman Turkish source dated 1928.
