= Göllet, Şenkaya =

Village in Turkey

Göllet
- Neighbourhood
- Location in Turkey
- Coordinates: 40°44′N 42°17′E
- Country: Turkey
- Province: Erzurum
- District: Şenkaya
- Population (2022): 144
- Time zone: UTC+3 (TRT)

Göllet is a neighbourhood in the municipality and district of Şenkaya, Erzurum Province in Turkey. Its population is 144 (2022).
