= Arıtaş, Oltu =

Village in Turkey

Arıtaş
- Neighbourhood
- Location in Turkey
- Coordinates: 40.6710°N 41.8421°E
- Country: Turkey
- Province: Erzurum
- District: Oltu
- Population (2022): 50
- Time zone: UTC+3 (TRT)

Arıtaş is a neighbourhood in the municipality and district of Oltu, Erzurum Province in Turkey. Its population is 50 (2022).
