= Tekeli, Oltu =

Village in Turkey

Tekeli
- Neighbourhood
- Country: Turkey
- Province: Erzurum
- District: Oltu
- Population (2022): 92
- Time zone: UTC+3 (TRT)

Tekeli is a neighbourhood in the municipality and district of Oltu, Erzurum Province in Turkey. Its population is 92 (2022).
