= Eğlek, Olur =

Village in Turkey

Eğlek
- Neighbourhood
- Location in Turkey
- Coordinates: 40°52′N 42°04′E
- Country: Turkey
- Province: Erzurum
- District: Olur
- Population (2022): 89
- Time zone: UTC+3 (TRT)

Eğlek is a neighbourhood in the municipality and district of Olur, Erzurum Province in Turkey. Its population is 89 (2022).
