= Oltu =

- District and municipality
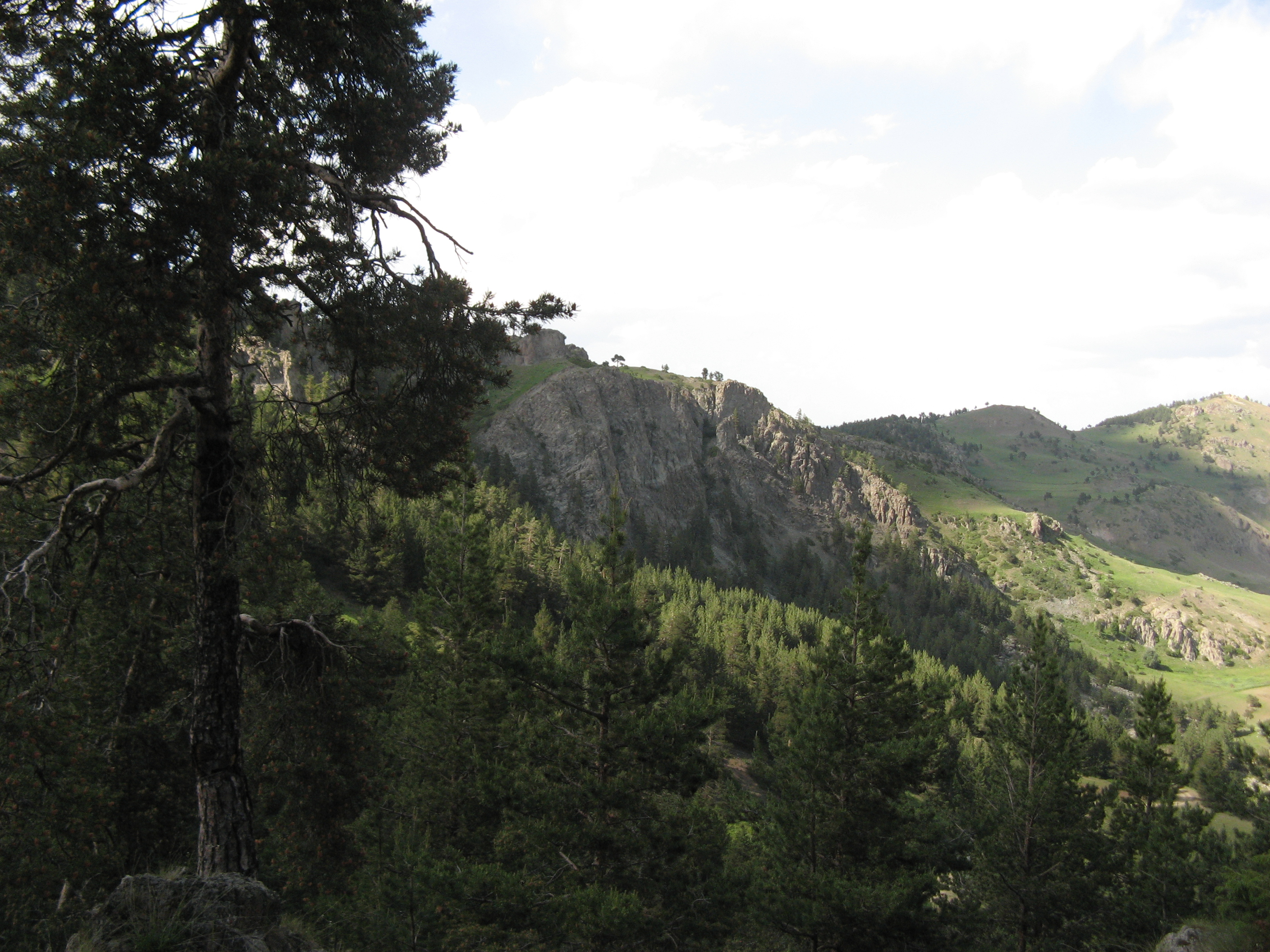

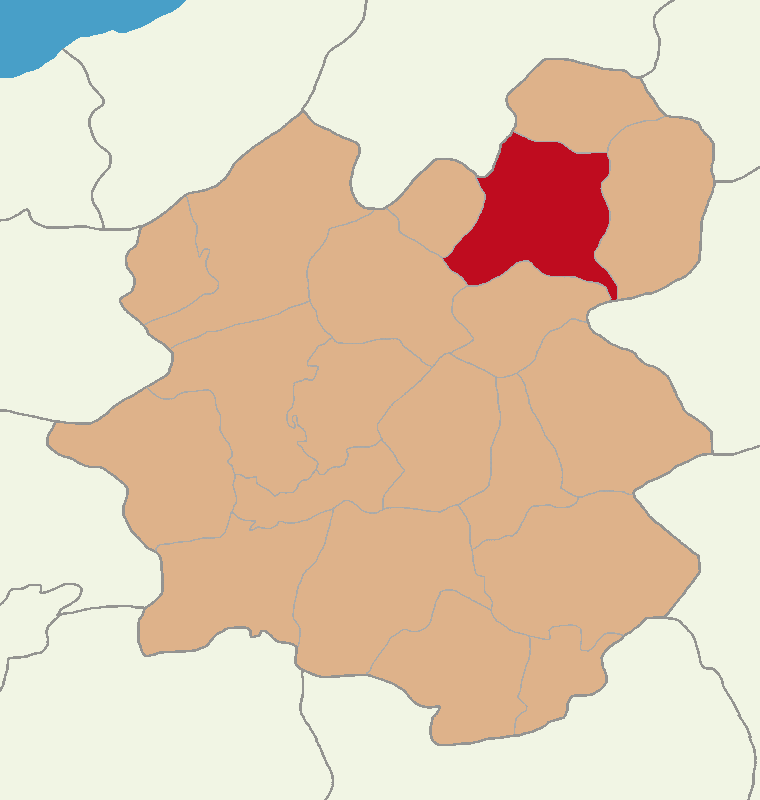
- Map showing Oltu District in Erzurum Province

- Location within Turkey
- Coordinates: 40°32′44″N 41°59′45″E
- Country: Turkey
- Province: Erzurum

Government
  - Mayor: Adem Çelebi (AKP)
- Area: 1,441 km^{2} (556 sq mi)
- Population (2022): 30,075
  - Density: 20.87/km^{2} (54.06/sq mi)
- Time zone: UTC+3 (TRT)
- Postal code: 25400
- Area code: 0442
- Climate: Dfb
- Website: www.oltu.bel.tr

Oltu (Georgian: ოლთისი, romanized: oltisi; Ottoman Turkish: اولتی, romanized: Olti) is a municipality and district of Erzurum Province, Turkey. Its area is 1,441 km^{2} (556 sq mi), and its population is 30,075 (2022). The mayor is Adem Çelebi, from the AKP.

== History ==
Oltu is theorised to be the diauehian settlement of Utu, mentioned by the urartians in the 12th-8th centuries BC.

An inscription found in Oltu's castle has been dated to the 7th century AD.(see below), but the settlement is known to have been established much earlier. The city-fortress had once belonged to the Mamikonian nakharars and later passed into the hands of the Bagratunis. Administratively, it was found within the borders of the region of Vok'aghe in the province of Tayk. The first mention of Oltu as a fortified settlement is in the 9th century when the Georgian Bagratids occupied this region. After the death of the Iberian Kuropalates David in 1000, the troops of Emperor Basil II occupied the castles and towns in the region of Tao-Tayk‛, which included Oltu. During the Byzantine–Georgian wars, after being defeated by Basil II, George I burnt the castle while fleeing the area in 1021. In the following centuries, Oltu successively passed into the control of the Seljuk Turks, the Mongols and Turkmen tribes. The Ottomans conquered Olti from the Georgians in the sixteenth century.

In the summer of 1829, the Russian Empire took control of the region, but ultimately relinquished it to the Ottomans upon the conclusion of peace. During the Russo-Turkish War of 1877–78, Oltu (Russian: Олты) was incorporated into the Russian Empire and made the center of the Olti Okrug of the militarily administered Kars Oblast.

The Olti Okrug along with the entire Kars Oblast were ceded by the Russian SFSR to the Ottoman Empire by virtue of the Treaty of Brest-Litovsk in 1918. After a brief reincorporation, Olti was again relinquished by the Ottomans in their 1919 withdrawal from the Kars Oblast as per the terms of the Armistice of Mudros. The First Republic of Armenia with British support expanded to include the self-governing Kars Oblast in the wake of the power vacuum caused by the Russian Revolution, however, was prevented from occupying the western half of the Olti Okrug by the commander of the Black Sea, G.F. Milne, as he believed Armenia had already acquired more territory than they could handle. In September 1920, 3 months after Armenia had seized the strategic coal fields of Penek in the Olti Okrug from the self-governing Kurdish militias, Turkish forces led by Kazım Karabekir recaptured the entire Olti Okrug, setting the stage for the Turkish–Armenian War—as a result of which, the Kars Oblast including Oltu was brought back under Turkish control in the midst of the Turkish War of National Liberation. The annexation was confirmed by the Treaty of Kars.

The primary historical sight in Oltu is the castle, which covers the top of a rocky outcrop. Its walls are fortified by large round towers and salients, including an imposing talus at the southwest. A circuit wall once extended from the outcrop to protect a small adjoining settlement. The medieval fortress is the result of two major periods of construction between the 7th and the 11th centuries; major repairs were undertaken by the Turkish Corps of Engineers in 1977. Atop the north tower are the remains of a Georgian hexaconch church in which a fragment of a 7th-century “bilingual” Greek-Armenian inscription was reused in the foundation. This Georgian church was built sometime between the 9th and 10th centuries. Inside the north tower is the tomb of a Muslim saint, Mişrî Zenūn. Late-antique and medieval churches as well as fortresses are located in the hills surrounding the Oltu-Penek valley at Cücürüs, Körolu, Olur, Kamhis, Sağoman, Olan, and nearby Kız.

During the Ottoman period the Arslan Pasa Mosque was built in 1665 by Arslan Pasha together with his grave. It is a domed structure with a pencil minaret. Nearby is the 14th century Muslim tomb/kümbet, of Misri Zunnun located. During the Russian rule (1878–1914) a new church was built. Some of its stones could have come from the medieval Bana Cathedral. It was partly ruined until in January 2019, District Governor Senol Turan announced to restore its structure. The project is supposed to complete in 2021, and the church will be converted into a library. In the village of Gaziler there is a 12th-century Saltukid castle with a small Ottoman mosque built in 1784.

== Demography ==
The area was inhabited by Kartvelian tribes of Taochi by the point of Xenophons campagin in the 5th century BC. It would remain dominated by Kartvelian tribes with an Armenia minority until the 5th and 6 th centuries AD, when Armenians and chalcedonean Christians in General started settling in huge number after the Byzantines persecution of the chalcedonean church. During the Umayyad invasion of Georgia, the region was devastated and depopated before being repopulated by a Georgian majority under Ashot I of Iberia with the help of the Byzantines emperor Leo V the Armenian.

Oltisi maintained a Georgian majority until Ottoman conauests forced the native population to adopt islam, the turkish language and turkish law. In the late 19th century the district of Oltu was mainly Turkish (65% in 1897) while the small town of Oltu was mixed (predominantly Armenian). The district became part of the Russian Empire in 1878. The Russian authorities held a census in 1897 showing that the district of Oltu, including the town, had 31,519 inhabitants of whom 20,719 were Turks (65.7%), 3,505 Kurds (11.1%), 3,125 Armenians (9.9%), 2,704 Greeks (8.6%) and 1,038 Russians (3.3%). In 1897, the town of Oltu had a population of 2,373, which included an Armenian-speaking plurality, and significant Russian and Turkish-speaking minorities. In 1914, the town of Oltu had a population of 3,258, two thirds of whom were Armenians, with the remainder consisting of Turks, Russians, and Roma people among others.

== Geography ==
Oltu is situated in the Oltu Brook Valley, a tributary of the Çoruh River, in the northeastern part of Turkey. Outside the valley the topography is mountainous, with ample mountain forests. The highest hills are Akdağ of 3,030 m and Kırdağ of 2,000 m. Annual average temperature is 10.2 °C.

Oltu is famous for its Oltu stone or Oltu gemstone, known as black amber with dull-bright black color and carved to produce jewelry, rosary beads, key-chains, pipes and boxes.

=== Climate ===
Climate data for Oltu (1991–2020)
Month	Jan	Feb	Mar	Apr	May	Jun	Jul	Aug	Sep	Oct	Nov	Dec	Year
Mean daily maximum °C (°F)	1.5 (34.7)	4.0 (39.2)	9.6 (49.3)	15.6 (60.1)	20.7 (69.3)	26.0 (78.8)	30.2 (86.4)	30.8 (87.4)	26.0 (78.8)	18.6 (65.5)	9.9 (49.8)	3.3 (37.9)	16.4 (61.5)
Daily mean °C (°F)	−3.1 (26.4)	−1.1 (30.0)	4.2 (39.6)	9.7 (49.5)	14.3 (57.7)	18.7 (65.7)	22.6 (72.7)	23.1 (73.6)	18.4 (65.1)	12.2 (54.0)	4.7 (40.5)	−1.1 (30.0)	10.3 (50.5)
Mean daily minimum °C (°F)	−6.9 (19.6)	−5.5 (22.1)	−0.8 (30.6)	4.3 (39.7)	8.5 (47.3)	12.1 (53.8)	15.7 (60.3)	15.9 (60.6)	11.5 (52.7)	6.6 (43.9)	0.3 (32.5)	−4.7 (23.5)	4.8 (40.6)
Average precipitation mm (inches)	14.75 (0.58)	15.82 (0.62)	30.12 (1.19)	47.39 (1.87)	61.59 (2.42)	48.21 (1.90)	38.83 (1.53)	25.76 (1.01)	20.3 (0.80)	30.7 (1.21)	20.4 (0.80)	19.61 (0.77)	373.48 (14.70)
Average precipitation days (≥ 1.0 mm)	3.7	4.3	5.3	8.4	10.3	8.0	5.9	4.8	4.0	5.3	4.2	4.3	68.5
Average relative humidity (%)	66.5	62.7	57.9	57.3	59.3	54.5	52.2	49.9	50.4	59.5	63.4	68.2	58.5
Source: NOAA

== Composition ==
There are 72 neighbourhoods in Oltu District:

- Alatarla
- Arıtaş
- Aşağıçamlı
- Aşağıkumlu
- Aslanpaşa
- Ayvalı
- Ayyıldız
- Bahçecik
- Bahçelikışla
- Ballıca
- Başaklı
- Başbağlar
- Çamlıbel
- Çanakpınar
- Çatak
- Çatalsöğüt
- Çayüstü
- Çengelli
- Cumhuriyet
- Dağdibi
- Damarlıtaş
- Demirtaş
- Derebaşı
- Dokuzdeğirmen
- Duralar
- Elmadüzü
- Erdoğmuş
- Esenyamaç
- Gökçedere
- Günlüce
- Güryaprak
- Güzelsu
- Halitpaşa
- İğdeli
- İnanmış
- İnciköy
- İpekçayırı
- İriağaç
- Kaleboğazı
- Karabekir
- Karataş
- Kayaaltı
- Kemerkaya
- Konukseven
- Küçükorucuk
- Nüğürcük
- Obayayla
- Orucuk
- Özdere
- Sağlıcak
- Sarısaz
- Şehitler
- Şendurak
- Subatuk
- Süleymanlı
- Sülünkaya
- Tekeli
- Toklu
- Topkaynak
- Toprakkale
- Tutlu
- Tutmaç
- Tuzlaköy
- Ünlükaya
- Vişneli
- Yarbaşı
- Yasin Haşimoğlu
- Yaylaçayır
- Yolboyu
- Yukarıçamlı
- Yukarıkumlu
- Yusuf Ziyabey
