= Kaban, Olur =

Village in Turkey

Kaban
- Neighbourhood
- Location in Turkey
- Coordinates: 40.788333°N 42.236389°E
- Country: Turkey
- Province: Erzurum
- District: Olur
- Population (2022): 78
- Time zone: UTC+3 (TRT)

Kaban is a neighbourhood in the municipality and district of Olur, Erzurum Province in Turkey. Its population is 78 (2022).
