= Ekinlik, Olur =

Village in Turkey

Ekinlik
- Neighbourhood
- Location in Turkey
- Coordinates: 40.876667°N 42.208056°E
- Country: Turkey
- Province: Erzurum
- District: Olur
- Population (2022): 38
- Time zone: UTC+3 (TRT)

Ekinlik is a neighbourhood in the municipality and district of Olur, Erzurum Province in Turkey. Its population is 38 (2022).
