= Beşpınarlar, Şenkaya =

Village in Turkey

Beşpınarlar
- Neighbourhood
- Location in Turkey
- Coordinates: 40°40′25″N 42°32′05″E
- Country: Turkey
- Province: Erzurum
- District: Şenkaya
- Population (2022): 273
- Time zone: UTC+3 (TRT)

Beşpınarlar is a neighbourhood in the municipality and district of Şenkaya, Erzurum Province in Turkey. Its population is 273 (2022).
