= Boğazgören, Olur =

Village in Turkey

Boğazgören
- Neighbourhood
- Location in Turkey
- Coordinates: 40.8365°N 42.2037°E
- Country: Turkey
- Province: Erzurum
- District: Olur
- Population (2022): 97
- Time zone: UTC+3 (TRT)

Boğazgören is a neighbourhood in the municipality and district of Olur, Erzurum Province in Turkey. Its population is 97 (2022).

The historical name of Boğazgören is Ureki. Ureki (ურეკი), a Georgian place name meaning "virgin forest". Ureki is also the name of a resort village on the Black Sea coast of Georgia.
