= Taşgeçit, Olur =

Village in Turkey

Taşgeçit
- Neighbourhood
- Location in Turkey
- Coordinates: 40.8936°N 42.2422°E
- Country: Turkey
- Province: Erzurum
- District: Olur
- Population (2022): 144
- Time zone: UTC+3 (TRT)

Taşgeçit is a neighbourhood in the municipality and district of Olur, Erzurum Province in Turkey. Its population is 144 (2022).
