= Aktaş, Şenkaya =

Village in Turkey

Aktaş
- Neighbourhood
- Location in Turkey
- Coordinates: 40.476°N 42.4428°E
- Country: Turkey
- Province: Erzurum
- District: Şenkaya
- Population (2022): 63
- Time zone: UTC+3 (TRT)

Aktaş is a neighbourhood in the municipality and district of Şenkaya, Erzurum Province in Turkey. Its population is 63 (2022).

The old name of the village of Aktaş is Vardaneti. Vardaneti (ვარდანეთი) is a Georgian place name. It derives from the Georgian word "vardi" (ვარდი) and means "Rose place". In the Georgian manuscript Tbetis Sulta Matiane (12th-16th century), Vardaneti is mentioned as a family name.
