= Alatarla, Oltu =

Village in Turkey

Alatarla
- Neighbourhood
- Location in Turkey
- Coordinates: 40.6323°N 41.7942°E
- Country: Turkey
- Province: Erzurum
- District: Oltu
- Population (2022): 170
- Time zone: UTC+3 (TRT)

Alatarla is a neighbourhood in the municipality and district of Oltu, Erzurum Province in Turkey. Its population is 170 (2022).
