= Nişantaşı, Şenkaya =

Village in Turkey

Nişantaşı
- Neighbourhood
- Location in Turkey
- Coordinates: 40.6941°N 42.3956°E
- Country: Turkey
- Province: Erzurum
- District: Şenkaya
- Population (2022): 486
- Time zone: UTC+3 (TRT)

Nişantaşı is a neighbourhood in the municipality and district of Şenkaya, Erzurum Province in Turkey. Its population is 486 (2022).
