= Atlı, Olur =

Neighborhood in Turkey

Atlı
- Neighbourhood
- Location within Turkey
- Coordinates: 40°54′02″N 42°02′19″E
- Country: Turkey
- Province: Erzurum
- District: Olur
- Population (2024): 136
- Time zone: UTC+3 (TRT)

Atlı is a neighborhood in the district of Olur, Erzurum Province, Turkey. Its population is 136 (2024).

The historical name of the village of Atlı is Ori. Ori (ორი) is a Georgian toponym meaning "two." This toponym may be related to the two churches located in the village. This toponym also appears as Ori (اوری) in Turkish sources.

Alosi, which used to be a separate village, is located north of the center of Atlı.
