= Başbağlar, Oltu =

Village in Turkey

Başbağlar
- Neighbourhood
- Location in Turkey
- Coordinates: 40.4669°N 41.6812°E
- Country: Turkey
- Province: Erzurum
- District: Oltu
- Population (2022): 68
- Time zone: UTC+3 (TRT)

Başbağlar is a neighbourhood in the municipality and district of Oltu, Erzurum Province in Turkey. Its population is 68 (2022).
