= Çataksu, Olur =

Village in Turkey

Çataksu
- Neighbourhood
- Location in Turkey
- Coordinates: 40.8248°N 41.939°E
- Country: Turkey
- Province: Erzurum
- District: Olur
- Population (2022): 303
- Time zone: UTC+3 (TRT)

Çataksu is a neighbourhood in the municipality and district of Olur, Erzurum Province in Turkey. Its population is 303 (2022).

The former name of Çataksu is Taoskari. Taoskari (ტაოსკარი), a Georgian place name, means ‘gate of Tao’. Indeed, this settlement is located at the end of the historical Klarjeti region and the beginning of the historical Tao region. This place name is written as Taoskar (طاوسكار) or Tavusker in Turkish.
