= Ünlükaya =

- Neighbourhood
- Location in Turkey
- Coordinates: 40°26′36″N 41°58′7″E
- Country: Turkey
- Province: Erzurum
- District: Oltu
- Population (2022): 328
- Time zone: UTC+3 (TRT)

Ünlükaya (formerly: Narman) is a neighbourhood in the municipality and district of Oltu, Erzurum Province in Turkey. Its population is 328 (2022).
