= Ormanağzı, Olur =

Village in Turkey

Ormanağzı
- Neighbourhood
- Location in Turkey
- Coordinates: 40°45′N 42°05′E
- Country: Turkey
- Province: Erzurum
- District: Olur
- Population (2022): 455
- Time zone: UTC+3 (TRT)

Ormanağzı is a neighbourhood in the municipality and district of Olur, Erzurum Province in Turkey. Its population is 455 (2022).
