= Aşağıkaracasu, Olur =

Village in Turkey

Aşağıkaracasu
- Neighbourhood
- Location in Turkey
- Coordinates: 40.8359°N 42.2464°E
- Country: Turkey
- Province: Erzurum
- District: Olur
- Population (2022): 251
- Time zone: UTC+3 (TRT)

Aşağıkaracasu is a neighbourhood in the municipality and district of Olur, Erzurum Province in Turkey. Its population is 251 (2022).
