= Hoşköy, Şenkaya =

Village in Turkey

Hoşköy
- Neighbourhood
- Country: Turkey
- Province: Erzurum
- District: Şenkaya
- Population (2022): 119
- Time zone: UTC+3 (TRT)

Hoşköy is a neighbourhood in the municipality and district of Şenkaya, Erzurum Province, Turkey. As of 2022, its population is 119.
