= Çamlıalan, Şenkaya =

Village in Turkey

Çamlıalan
- Neighbourhood
- Location in Turkey
- Coordinates: 40.7359°N 42.4535°E
- Country: Turkey
- Province: Erzurum
- District: Şenkaya
- Population (2022): 388
- Time zone: UTC+3 (TRT)

Çamlıalan is a neighbourhood in the municipality and district of Şenkaya, Erzurum Province in Turkey. Its population is 388 (2022).
