= Erdoğmuş, Oltu =

Village in Turkey

Erdoğmuş
- Neighbourhood
- Country: Turkey
- Province: Erzurum
- District: Oltu
- Population (2022): 36
- Time zone: UTC+3 (TRT)

Erdoğmuş is a neighbourhood in the municipality and district of Oltu, Erzurum Province in Turkey. Its population is 36 (2022).

Erdoğmuş's old name is Pertasori. Pertasori (ფერთასორი) is composed of the words "perta" (ფერთა), meaning "colors" in Georgian, and "sori" (სორი), which is a variant of the Armenian word "dzor" (ձոր), meaning stream, which is present in Georgian geography.
