= Dörtyol, Şenkaya =

Village in Turkey

Dörtyol
- Neighbourhood
- Location in Turkey
- Coordinates: 40°25′49″N 42°11′15″E
- Country: Turkey
- Province: Erzurum
- District: Şenkaya
- Population (2022): 133
- Time zone: UTC+3 (TRT)

Dörtyol is a neighbourhood in the municipality and district of Şenkaya, Erzurum Province in Turkey. Its population is 133 (2022).
