= Ormanlı, Şenkaya =

Village in Turkey

Ormanlı
- Neighbourhood
- Country: Turkey
- Province: Erzurum
- District: Şenkaya
- Population (2022): 360
- Time zone: UTC+3 (TRT)

Ormanlı is a neighbourhood in the municipality and district of Şenkaya, Erzurum Province in Turkey. Its population is 360 (2022).
