= Köşkköy, Şenkaya =

Village in Turkey

Köşkköy
- Neighbourhood
- Country: Turkey
- Province: Erzurum
- District: Şenkaya
- Population (2022): 218
- Time zone: UTC+3 (TRT)

Köşkköy is a neighbourhood in the municipality and district of Şenkaya, Erzurum Province in Turkey. Its population is 218 (2022).
