= Alıcık, Şenkaya =

Village in Turkey

Alıcık
- Neighbourhood
- Location in Turkey
- Coordinates: 40.6863°N 42.226°E
- Country: Turkey
- Province: Erzurum
- District: Şenkaya
- Population (2022): 399
- Time zone: UTC+3 (TRT)

Alıcık is a neighbourhood in the municipality and district of Şenkaya, Erzurum Province in Turkey. Its population is 399 (2022).
