= Gözebaşı, Şenkaya =

Village in Turkey

Gözebaşı
- Neighbourhood
- Location in Turkey
- Coordinates: 40°23′47″N 42°17′34″E
- Country: Turkey
- Province: Erzurum
- District: Şenkaya
- Population (2022): 32
- Time zone: UTC+3 (TRT)

Gözebaşı is a neighbourhood in the municipality and district of Şenkaya, Erzurum Province in Turkey. Its population is 32 (2022).
