= Kürkçü, Şenkaya =

Village in Turkey

Kürkçü
- Neighbourhood
- Location in Turkey
- Coordinates: 40.4944°N 42.4399°E
- Country: Turkey
- Province: Erzurum
- District: Şenkaya
- Population (2022): 165
- Time zone: UTC+3 (TRT)

Kürkçü is a neighbourhood in the municipality and district of Şenkaya, Erzurum Province in Turkey. Its population is 165 (2022).
