= Yaylabaşı, Olur =

Village in Turkey

Yaylabaşı
- Neighbourhood
- Location in Turkey
- Coordinates: 40.854722°N 42.181111°E
- Country: Turkey
- Province: Erzurum
- District: Olur
- Population (2022): 46
- Time zone: UTC+3 (TRT)

Yaylabaşı is a neighbourhood in the municipality and district of Olur, Erzurum Province in Turkey. Its population is 46 (2022).
