= Özyurt, Şenkaya =

Village in Turkey

Özyurt
- Neighbourhood
- Location in Turkey
- Coordinates: 40°42′10″N 42°20′45″E
- Country: Turkey
- Province: Erzurum
- District: Şenkaya
- Population (2022): 320
- Time zone: UTC+3 (TRT)

Özyurt is a neighbourhood in the municipality and district of Şenkaya, Erzurum Province in Turkey. Its population is 320 (2022).

Özyurt's former name was Bariki. Bariki (Georgian: ბარიკი) is a Georgian place name and is related to the word ‘bari’ (ბარი). Indeed, Georgian Turkologist Sergi Jikia notes that some Georgian words used to end with the suffix ‘-ki’ (-კი). Bari (ბარი) means valley in the Georgian language. Bariki is written as "Barik" (بریك) in the Ottoman land-survey register (mufassal defter) of 1595.
