= Dolunay, Şenkaya =

Village in Turkey

Dolunay
- Neighbourhood
- Country: Turkey
- Province: Erzurum
- District: Şenkaya
- Population (2022): 343
- Time zone: UTC+3 (TRT)

Dolunay is a neighbourhood in the municipality and district of Şenkaya, Erzurum Province in Turkey. Its population is 343 (2022).
