= İnceçay, Şenkaya =

Village in Turkey

İnceçay
- Neighbourhood
- Location in Turkey
- Coordinates: 40°47′13″N 42°18′32″E
- Country: Turkey
- Province: Erzurum
- District: Şenkaya
- Population (2022): 125
- Time zone: UTC+3 (TRT)

İnceçay is a neighbourhood in the municipality and district of Şenkaya, Erzurum Province in Turkey. Its population is 125 (2022).
