= Yukarıkaracasu, Olur =

Village in Turkey

Yukarıkaracasu
- Neighbourhood
- Location in Turkey
- Coordinates: 40°50′N 42°17′E
- Country: Turkey
- Province: Erzurum
- District: Olur
- Population (2022): 280
- Time zone: UTC+3 (TRT)

Yukarıkaracasu is a neighbourhood in the municipality and district of Olur, Erzurum Province in Turkey. Its population is 280 (2022).
