= Gezenek, Şenkaya =

Village in Turkey

Gezenek
- Neighbourhood
- Location in Turkey
- Coordinates: 40°30′59″N 42°17′14″E
- Country: Turkey
- Province: Erzurum
- District: Şenkaya
- Population (2022): 46
- Time zone: UTC+3 (TRT)

Gezenek is a neighbourhood in the municipality and district of Şenkaya, Erzurum Province in Turkey. Its population is 46 (2022).
