= Gaziler, Şenkaya =

Village in Turkey

Gaziler
- Neighbourhood
- Location in Turkey
- Coordinates: 40.4215°N 42.3479°E
- Country: Turkey
- Province: Erzurum
- District: Şenkaya
- Population (2022): 299
- Time zone: UTC+3 (TRT)

Gaziler is a neighbourhood in the municipality and district of Şenkaya, Erzurum Province in Turkey. Its population is 299 (2022).

== Etymology ==
The historical name of Gaziler is Bardusi or Bardisi. The Georgian toponym Bardisi (ბარდისი) may be derived from the word "bardi" (ბარდი) meaning "undergrowth". In this form, the toponym means "place of undergrowth".

Gaziler was known as Bardus or Barduz (Russian: Бардус or Бардуз) within the Russian Empire as part of the Olti Okrug of the Kars Oblast.

== History ==
During the First Republic of Armenia's administration of the Kars Oblast in 1919, Turkish and Azerbaijani agents engaged in arms deliveries and sedition through the environs of Gaziler. The village later became the site of battles between the Armenian army and local Kurdish militia supplemented by the Turkish army in June 1920, finally passing to Turkish republican control by late 1920, as confirmed by the Treaty of Kars.

== Demographics ==
In 1886, Barduz had 404 inhabitants including 392 Greeks and 12 Ossetians. In 1897, the village had 540 inhabitants including 280 men and 260 women, 519 of whom were Eastern Orthodox. In 1914, there were 728 inhabitants in Barduz, predominantly Greeks.
