= Şenkaya =

- District and municipality
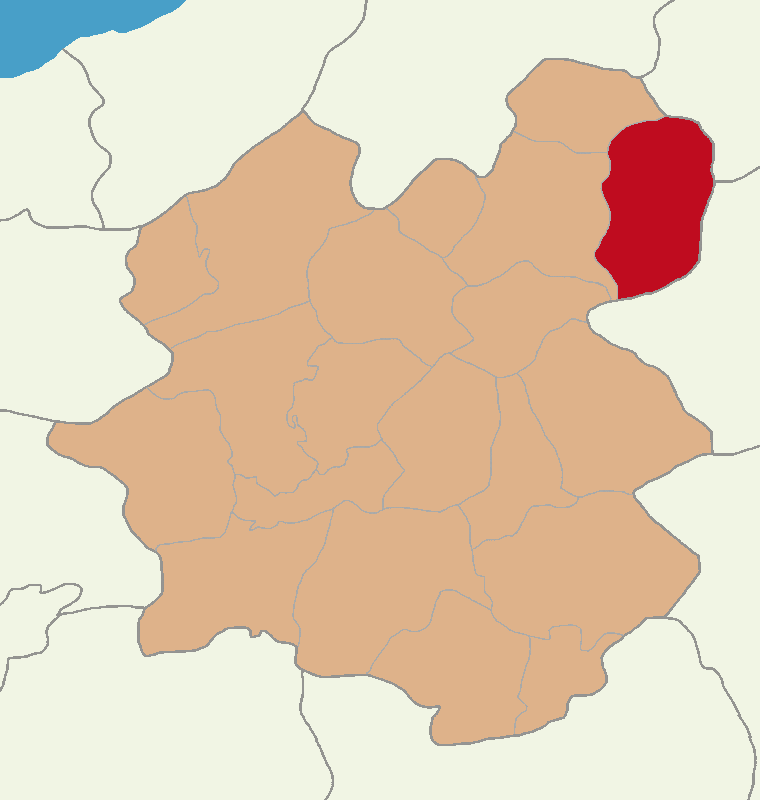
- Map showing Şenkaya District in Erzurum Province

- Location within Turkey
- Coordinates: 40°33′43″N 42°20′47″E
- Country: Turkey
- Province: Erzurum

Government
  - Mayor: Görbil Özcan (CHP)
- Area: 1,381 km^{2} (533 sq mi)
- Elevation: 1,800 m (5,900 ft)
- Population (2022): 16,035
  - Density: 11.61/km^{2} (30.07/sq mi)
- Time zone: UTC+3 (TRT)
- Postal code: 25360
- Area code: 0442
- Climate: Dfb
- Website: www.senkaya.bel.tr

Şenkaya (Kurdish: Bardûz) is a municipality and district of Erzurum Province, Turkey. Its area is 1,381 km^{2}, and its population is 16,035 (2022). The mayor is Görbil Özcan (CHP).

The name Şenkaya emerged in a later period. The Şenkaya district (ilçe) was established in 1946 by merging the sub-district (nahiye) of Kamkhis, Kosor, and Bardız. The town of Şenkaya is based on the village of Örtülü. The name of Örtülü may have evolved from the Georgian "Ortauli" (ორთაული).

== Composition ==
There are 71 neighbourhoods in Şenkaya District:

- Akşar
- Aktaş
- Alıcık
- Aşağı
- Aşağıbakraçlı
- Atyolu
- Aydoğdu
- Balkaya
- Bereketli
- Beşpınarlar
- Beykaynak
- Çamlıalan
- Çatalelma
- Değirmenlidere
- Deliktaş
- Doğanköy
- Dokuzelma
- Dolunay
- Dörtyol
- Esence
- Esenyurt
- Evbakan
- Gaziler
- Gezenek
- Göllet
- Göreşken
- Gözalan
- Gözebaşı
- Gülveren
- Hoşköy
- İçmesu
- İğdeli
- İkizpınar
- İnceçay
- Kayalısu
- Kaynak
- Kireçli
- Köroğlu
- Köşkköy
- Kürkçü
- Nişantaşı
- Ormanlı
- Oyuktaş
- Özyurt
- Paşalı
- Penek
- Sarıkayalar
- Sarıyar
- Şenpınar
- Sındıran
- Söğütler
- Susuz
- Tahtköy
- Tazeköy
- Teketaş
- Timurkışla
- Turnalı
- Tütenocak
- Uğurlu
- Yanıkkaval
- Yaymeşe
- Yazılı
- Yelkıran
- Yeşildemet
- Yeşilkaya
- Yoğurtçular
- Yukarı
- Yukarıbakraçlı
- Yünören
- Yürekli
- Zümrüt
