= Olur =

Town in Erzurum Province in Turkey

Olur (Georgian: ოლორი) is a town in the Olur district of Erzurum Province in Turkey, located in the historical Tao region. It is the administrative centre of Olur district. Its population is 6,262 (2022).

== History ==
Olur was a village in the 16th century when the Ottomans captured it from the Georgians. According to the 1574 Ottoman land-survey register (mufassal defter), it was part of the Panaskerti subdistrict of the Ardahan-i Büzürg province (liva). Its population consisted of 64 households. During Ottoman rule, two households converted to Islam, while 62 households remained Christian. According to the 1595 Ottoman land-survey register (mufassal defter), the village's population had fallen to 60 households. At this time, there were only two newly converted Muslim households. The names and patronymics of the household heads indicate that Georgians and Armenians lived in the village.

Olur was ceded to Russia by the Ottoman Empire after the 1877-1878 Russo-Turkish War. In the 1886 census conducted by the Russian administration, the village was recorded as Olor (Олор) and was one of 18 villages in the Olor subdistrict (маркязъ) of the Tausker district (uchastok) in the Olti okrug within the Kars oblast, serving as the administrative centre of this subdistrict (маркязъ). The village had a population of 273, consisting of Turks, Armenians and Kurds. According to information provided by Georgian historian and archaeologist Ekvtime Takaishvili in 1907, the administrator of the Tausker district (uchastok) resided in this village. The church, built during the period when the Christian population lived there, had been completely destroyed. In later years, the town of Olur, which was the centre of the Olur subdistrict, became the centre of the Olur district, established in 1958.
