= Deaths in June 2014 =

The following is a list of notable deaths in June 2014.

Entries for each day are listed alphabetically by surname. A typical entry lists information in the following sequence:

- Name, age, country of citizenship and reason for notability, established cause of death, reference.

== June 2014 ==
=== 1 ===
- Salvador Anzelmo, 93, American lawyer and politician, member of the Louisiana House of Representatives (1960–1972).
- Liliana Archibald, 86, English insurance broker, ruptured aortic aneurysm.
- Andres Briner, 91, Swiss music historian, academic and art journalist.
- Chang Feng-hsu, 85, Taiwanese politician, Pingtung County Magistrate (1964–1973), Mayor of Taipei (1972–1976), Minister of the Interior (1976–1978).
- John Edwards Conway, 79, American senior and chief judge (District of New Mexico), and federal judge (FISA Court).
- Ann B. Davis, 88, American actress (The Bob Cummings Show, The Brady Bunch, Lover Come Back), Emmy winner (1958, 1959), subdural hematoma from a fall.
- Bibi Dawood, 87, South African anti-apartheid activist.
- Dolfi Drimer, 79, Romanian chess player and engineer.
- Brian Farmer, 80, English footballer (Birmingham City).
- Heinrich Fasching, 85, Austrian Roman Catholic prelate, Auxiliary Bishop of Sankt Pölten (1993–2004).
- Karlheinz Hackl, 65, Austrian actor (Sophie's Choice), malignant brain tumor.
- John Hills, 53, British jockey and horse trainer, pancreatic cancer.
- Yuri Kochiyama, 93, American internment camp detainee and civil rights activist.
- Dhondutai Kulkarni, 86, Indian Jaipur-Atrauli gharana singer, recipient of the Sangeet Natak Akademi Award (1990).
- Juhani Laakso, 72, Finnish Olympic shooter.
- Jay Lake, 49, American author (Mainspring), colorectal cancer.
- Timofei Moșneaga, 82, Moldovan physician and politician, minister of health (1994–1997).
- Valentin Mankin, 75, Ukrainian Soviet sailor, Olympic triple champion (1968, 1972, 1980) and silver medalist (1976), cancer.
- Lawrence G. Miller, 78, American politician, member of the Connecticut House of Representatives (since 1991).
- Tarō Naka, 92, Japanese poet, pneumonia.
- Joseph Olita, 70, Kenyan actor (Rise and Fall of Idi Amin, Mississippi Masala), hypertension.
- Antonio Rada, 77, Colombian World Cup footballer (1962), cancer.
- Tom Rounds, 77, American radio production executive (American Top 40), complications from surgery.
- Gholamreza Khosravi Savadjani, Iranian political prisoner, executed.
- Jack Souther, 90, Canadian volcanologist.
- Sir Hugo White, 74, British Navy officer, Governor of Gibraltar (1995–1997), admiral and Commander-in-Chief Fleet (1992–1995).

=== 2 ===
- Kitty Baker, 101, American mathematics educator, heart failure.
- Carl Bennett, 91, American statistician.
- Ramona Brooks, 63, American singer, cancer.
- Ivica Brzić, 73, Serbian football player (FK Željezničar Sarajevo, FK Vojvodina) and manager (CA Osasuna, RCD Mallorca, Alianza Lima).
- Max Charlesworth, 88, Australian philosopher.
- Anjan Das, 62, Indian National Film Award-winning filmmaker (Faltu), liver cancer.
- Ernie Eiffler, 88, Australian football player (Collingwood).
- Donald Flores, 65, Northern Marianan politician, Mayor of Saipan (since 2010), stroke.
- Anatol Grințescu, 74, Romanian Olympic water polo player.
- Gennadi Gusarov, 77, Russian footballer.
- Bill Harris, 69, Scottish geneticist.
- James Keegstra, 80, Canadian teacher and politician.
- James E. Keller, 71, American judge, member of the Kentucky Supreme Court (1999–2005), cancer.
- Nikolay Khrenkov, 29, Russian Olympic bobsledder (2014), traffic collision.
- Phạm Huỳnh Tam Lang, 72, Vietnamese football player and manager, stroke.
- Duraisamy Simon Lourdusamy, 90, Indian Roman Catholic prelate, Cardinal of Santa Maria (since 1985), Archbishop of Bangalore (1968–1971).
- Maciej Łukaszczyk, 80, Polish pianist.
- Weldon Myrick, 76, American steel guitar player (The Nashville A-Team, Area Code 615).
- Johnny Ould, 74, British Olympic boxer.
- Mame Reiley, 61, American political strategist, cancer.
- Kuaima Riruako, 79, Namibian chieftain, Paramount Chief of the Herero (since 1978), Hereroland Political Representative to South Africa (1978–1980), hypertension.
- Alexander Shulgin, 88, American pharmacologist and chemist, MDMA pioneer, liver cancer.
- Tapan Sikdar, 69, Indian politician, MP for Dum Dum (1998–2004), kidney failure.
- Marjorie Stapp, 92, American actress (The Blazing Trail, Problem Girls, Suicide Battalion).

=== 3 ===
- Myles Ambrose, 87, American prosecutor and civil servant, commissioner for Customs and Border Patrol, heart failure.
- S. D. Bandaranayake, 96, Sri Lankan politician.
- Svyatoslav Belza, 72, Russian music and literary critic.
- Gordon Bennett, 59, Australian artist.
- Roy M. Goodman, 84, American politician, member of the New York Senate (1969–2002), respiratory failure.
- Sir Eldon Griffiths, 89, British politician, MP for Bury St Edmunds (1964–1992), Minister for Sport (1970–1974).
- Karl Harris, 34, English motorcycle racer, race collision.
- Anthony Kelly, 85, British materials scientist.
- Steve King, 56, American record producer and audio engineer (The Eminem Show), liver disease.
- Elodie Lauten, 63, French-born American composer.
- André Lochon, 81, French Olympic water polo player.
- Virginia Luque, 86, Argentine singer and actress.
- Kaneyasu Marutani, 94, Japanese politician, member of the House of Councillors (1977–1989).
- Basheer Mauladad, 82–83, Kenyan Asian leader. (death announced on this date)
- Narendra Patni, 71, Indian chief executive, founded Patni Computer Systems, heart attack.
- Gopinath Munde, 64, Indian politician, Minister of Rural Development (since 2014), MP (since 2009), Maharashtra MLA, DCM and Minister of Home Affairs, traffic collision.
- Fritz Schwegler, 79, German artist and academic.
- James Alan Shelton, 53, American bluegrass guitarist (Ralph Stanley), cancer.
- David Yardley, 84, British legal scholar and public servant.

=== 4 ===
- Neal Arden, 104, British actor.
- Joseph Befe Ateba, 52, Cameroonian Roman Catholic prelate, Bishop of Kribi (since 2008).
- John Baker, 86, British Anglican prelate, Bishop of Salisbury (1982–1993).
- Don Banfield, 97, Australian politician, Attorney-General of South Australia (1979).
- Waldemar Beck, 93, German Olympic rower.
- Tom Coleman, 85, American politician, member of the Georgia State Senate (1981–1995).
- George Ho, 94, American-born Chinese Hong Kong media owner (Commercial Television and Radio), recipient of the Gold Bauhinia Star (2001).
- A. Walton Litz, 84, American literary historian.
- Sheila Lumpe, 79, American politician.
- Doc Neeson, 67, Australian musician (The Angels), malignant brain tumour.
- Ed Negre, 86, American race-car driver and owner (NASCAR, Dale Earnhardt).
- Chester Nez, 93, American Navajo code talker, last remaining Navajo who developed the code, recipient of the Congressional Gold Medal (2001), renal failure.
- Thor Olsen, 84, Norwegian Olympic weightlifter.
- William Schuelein, 86, American politician, member of the Oklahoma Senate (1972–1992).
- Cliff Severn, 88, British-born American cricketer (national team) and child actor (A Christmas Carol, How Green Was My Valley).
- Nathan Shamuyarira, 85, Zimbabwean newspaper editor and politician, Minister of Information (1980–1987) and Foreign Affairs (1987–1995), chest infection.
- Edward Sövik, 95, American architect and author.
- Sydney Templeman, Baron Templeman, 94, British judge and law lord.
- Martin Treacy, 78, Irish hurler (Kilkenny).
- Otto van Verschuer, 86, Dutch baron, estate manager and politician, member of the States of Gelderland (1962–1978) and Executive (1965–1978).
- Buddy Wentworth, 77, Namibian politician, recipient of the Ordre des Palmes Académiques, heart disease.
- Walter Winkler, 71, Polish footballer (Polonia Bytom, national team).
- Don Zimmer, 83, American baseball player (Brooklyn Dodgers) and manager (Boston Red Sox, Chicago Cubs), heart failure as a complication from cardiac surgery.

=== 5 ===
- Bob Abrahamian, 35, American disc jockey and record collector, suicide.
- Abu Abdulrahman al-Bilawi, 42–43, Iraqi ISIL military commander.
- Roger Ackling, 66, British sculptor, complications from motor neurone disease.
- Maria Alquilar, 86, American ceramic artist.
- Édouard Mwe di Malila Apenela, 76, Congolese businessman.
- Hans Baars-Lindner, 88, German Olympic sailor (1960).
- Ganiyu Akanbi Bello, 83, Nigerian community leader and businessman, murdered.
- Nina Byers, 84, American physicist.
- Christopher Burger, 78, South African cricketer.
- Don Davis, 75, American musician, songwriter (Who's Making Love, Disco Lady) and Grammy Award-winning producer (You Don't Have to Be a Star).
- Rolf Hachmann, 96, German archaeologist.
- Matthew Washington Kennedy, 93, American pianist, complications from cancer.
- Robert Kuwałek, 47, Polish historian.
- Johnny Leach, 91, British table tennis player, World Table Tennis Champion (1949, 1951), team champion (1953), President of the ETTA.
- Ismael Betancourt Lebron, 83, Puerto Rican police officer.
- Edythe Lewis, 90, American disc jockey, complications from Alzheimer's disease.
- Niall Lucy, 57, American writer and scholar, cancer.
- Hana Orgoníková, 67, Czech politician, MP for the CSDP (since 1989).
- Aaron Sachs, 90, American jazz musician.
- Reiulf Steen, 80, Norwegian politician and diplomat, Minister of Transportation (1971–1972) and Commerce (1979–1981), MP for Oslo and Akershus (1977–1993), Ambassador to Chile (1992–1996).

=== 6 ===
- Irene Awret, 93, German artist, author and Holocaust survivor.
- Darío Barrio, 41, Spanish television chef, BASE jumping accident.
- Douglas Bartles-Smith, 77, English Anglican priest, Archdeacon of Southwark (1985–2004).
- Ado Bayero, 83, Nigerian chieftain, politician and diplomat, Emir of Kano (since 1963), Northern Region MLA, Ambassador to Senegal, cancer.
- Alejandro Antonio Buccolini, 84, Argentine Roman Catholic prelate, Bishop of Río Gallegos (1992–2005).
- Tap Canutt, 81, American stunt performer and actor.
- Joyce Mitchell Cook, 80, American philosopher.
- Karen DeCrow, 76, American civil rights activist, lawyer and author, President of the National Organization for Women (1974–1977), melanoma.
- Alain Desaever, 61, Belgian cyclist.
- Mary Ellen Epps, 79, American politician.
- Eric Hill, 86, British children's writer and illustrator (Spot the Dog).
- Lee Hyla, 61, American composer.
- David Lockwood, 85, British sociologist.
- Brian Miller, 93, Australian politician, member of the Tasmanian Legislative Council (1957–1986).
- Sheldon Roberts, 87, American metallurgist.
- Jerrold Schwaber, 67, American cell biologist.
- Alexander Shilov, 84, Russian chemist.
- Lorna Wing, 85, British psychiatrist, co-founder of the National Autistic Society, coined the term "Asperger syndrome".

=== 7 ===
- Dora Akunyili, 59, Nigerian politician and academic, Federal Minister of Information and Communications (2008–2010), ovarian cancer.
- Leonard Bawtree, 90, Canadian politician.
- Natalia Bazhanova, 67, Russian orientalist.
- Eugene Cotran, 75, English judge.
- Alan Douglas, 82, American record producer (Jimi Hendrix) and sound engineer (Eric Clapton).
- Dick Elliott, 78, American politician, member of the South Carolina House of Representatives (1982–1992) and Senate (1992–2012).
- Kevin Elyot, 62, British scriptwriter (Clapham Junction) and playwright (My Night with Reg).
- Fernandão, 36, Brazilian footballer (Sport Club Internacional, national team), helicopter crash.
- E. W. Foy, 77, American basketball coach (Southeastern Louisiana Lions, McNeese State Cowboys).
- Glenn Freeman, 80, American politician, member of the Kentucky House of Representatives (1970–1971, 1974–1977) and Senate (1996–2000).
- Jurij Gustinčič, 92, Slovene journalist and writer.
- Marjorie Haines, 85, American Olympic equestrian.
- Anthony Herbert, 84, American army officer and whistleblower.
- Jacques Herlin, 86, French character actor (Of Gods and Men).
- Amy C. King, 85, American mathematician, house fire.
- Jónas Kristjánsson, 90, Icelandic academic and novelist.
- Juan María Leonardi Villasmil, 67, Venezuelan Roman Catholic prelate, Bishop of Punto Fijo (since 1997).
- Roger Mayne, 85, English photographer.
- Epainette Mbeki, 98, South African anti-apartheid activist.
- James McNair, 62, American writer and comedian, traffic collision.
- Stephen A. Metcalf, 86, British missionary.
- Hélcio Milito, 83, Brazilian musician.
- Pierre Patry, 80, Canadian filmmaker.
- Ida Schöpfer, 84, Swiss Olympic alpine skier.
- Clara Schroth, 93, American gymnast, Olympic bronze medalist (1948).
- Uday Singh, 75, Fijian politician.
- Merv Thackeray, 88, Australian politician, member of the Queensland Legislative Assembly for Keppel (1957–1960) and Rockhampton North (1960–1972).
- Anna-Teresa Tymieniecka, 91, Polish-born American philosopher.
- David Tyshler, 86, Russian Soviet Olympic fencer (1956) and academic.
- Norman Willis, 81, British trade unionist, General Secretary of the TUC (1984–1993).

=== 8 ===
- Ruy Barbosa Popolizio, 94, Chilean businessman, oenologist and cathedratic, Minister of Agriculture (1963–1964), Rector of the University of Chile (1968–1969).
- John Bartlett, 85, English cricketer.
- Aman Ullah Chowdhury, Bangladeshi politician.
- Jan Deberitz, 64, Norwegian novelist.
- Ken Doubleday, 88, Australian Olympic hurdler and triple jumper (1952, 1956).
- Hans Kristian Eriksen, 81, Norwegian non-fiction writer, magazine editor, novelist and short story writer.
- Jean Geissinger, 79, American baseball player (AAGPBL).
- Alexander Imich, 111, Russian Congress Poland-born American chemist, parapsychologist and supercentenarian, oldest man in the world.
- Eva Kløvstad, 92, Norwegian World War II resistance member (Milorg).
- Veronica Lazăr, 76, Romanian-born Italian actress (Inferno, Last Tango in Paris, The Stendhal Syndrome).
- Dennis Lewiston, 80, British cinematographer.
- Harold Russell Maddock, 96, Australian jockey.
- Shirley Marsh, 88, American politician, member of the Nebraska Legislature (1973–1989).
- J. Stanley Marshall, 91, American educator, President of Florida State University (1969–1976), complications from a heart attack.
- Billy McCool, 69, American baseball player (Cincinnati Reds).
- J. William Pope, 76, American politician and lawyer, member of the Tennessee House of Representatives, cancer.
- Celio Roncancio, 48, Colombian cyclist.
- Ivo Vinco, 86, Italian opera singer.
- Ben Whitaker, 79, British politician and global poverty campaigner, MP for Hampstead (1966–1970).
- Yoshihito, Prince Katsura, 66, Japanese royal, acute heart failure.

=== 9 ===
- Bernard Agré, 88, Ivorian Roman Catholic prelate, Cardinal of San Giovanni (since 2001), Archbishop of Abidjan (1994–2006).
- Danilo Baroni, 92, Argentine lawyer and politician, Governor of Chaco (1987–1991).
- Tapan Barua, Indian cricketer.
- Harris Blake, 84, American politician, member of the North Carolina Senate (2003–2013), natural causes.
- William A. Bradfield, 86, New Zealand astronomer.
- Allan Brown, 89, Australian football player (Collingwood).
- John Ferguson Browne, 93, Canadian politician, MP for Vancouver-Kingsway (1958–1962).
- Edmund Bruggmann, 71, Swiss alpine skier, Olympic silver medalist (1972), complications from leukemia.
- Alison Burton, 92, Australian tennis player.
- Rex L. Carter, 88, American politician, member of the South Carolina House of Representatives (1953–1980) and Speaker (1973–1980).
- Robert Cranston, 85, Indian Olympic boxer.
- Junie Donlavey, 90, American Hall of Fame NASCAR team owner (Ken Schrader, Jody Ridley, Donlavey Racing), Alzheimer's disease.
- Marit Svarva Henriksen, 89, Norwegian politician.
- Reinhard Höppner, 65, German politician, Minister-President of Saxony-Anhalt (1994–2002), cancer.
- Kim Heungsou, 94, Japanese Korean-born South Korean harmonism artist.
- Stuart Long, 50, American boxer and priest.
- Rik Mayall, 56, English comedian, writer and actor (The Young Ones, Drop Dead Fred, Bottom), cardiac arrest.
- Bosse Persson, 72, Swedish eccentric and political figure, founder of the Donald Duck Party.
- Elsie Quarterman, 103, American plant ecologist.
- Vitaly Shafranov, 84, Russian theoretical physicist.
- Alicemarie Huber Stotler, 72, American senior judge, member (1984–2009) and Chief Judge (2005–2009) of the US District Court for Central California.
- Scott Studenmund, 24, American staff sergeant, airstrike.
- Gustave Tassell, 88, American fashion designer, complications from Alzheimer's disease.
- Bob Welch, 57, American baseball player (Los Angeles Dodgers, Oakland Athletics), Cy Young Award winner (1990), accidental fall.
- Gerd Zacher, 84, German composer and author.

=== 10 ===
- Toribio Aguilera, 73, Honduran economist and politician, MP for Cortés (1998–2014), lymphatic cancer.
- Kamaluddin Ahmed, 75, Pakistani physicist, hepatitis.
- Sebastián Alabanda, 63, Spanish footballer (Real Betis), heart attack.
- Marcello Alencar, 88, Brazilian politician and lawyer, Governor of Rio de Janeiro (1995–1999), Mayor of Rio de Janeiro (1983–1986, 1989–1993).
- Gemmell Alexander, 95, British military officer and colonial officer.
- Robert Arthur Alexie, 56, Canadian Gwich'in politician and novelist, Chief (1989–1991), President of the Tribal Council, chief First Nations negotiator during 1992 land reform.
- Frank Asaro, 86, American chemist.
- Albert Baernstein II, 73, American mathematician.
- Gabrielle Blunt, 95, British actress.
- Vladimir Derer, 94, British politician, founder of the Campaign for Labour Party Democracy.
- Jay Disharoon, 65, American politician, member of the Mississippi House of Representatives (1976–1980) and Senate (1980–1988), traffic collision.
- Julio García Estrada, 90, Mexican lawyer and academic.
- Gary Gilmour, 62, Australian Test cricketer.
- Robert M. Grant, 96, American theologian.
- Jim Hazelton, 82, Australian aviator, prostate cancer.
- Ian Horrocks, British RAF officer.
- Jack Lee, 94, American politician and radio broadcaster, Mayor of Fayetteville, North Carolina (1971–1975), chairman of the North Carolina Republican Party.
- Walter Lemos, 84, Argentine Olympic runner.
- Khair Bakhsh Marri, 86, Pakistani Baloch nationalist leader and militant, leader of the BLA, complications from a brain haemorrhage.
- Gerald N. McAllister, 91, American Episcopal prelate, Bishop of Oklahoma (1977–1989).
- William Pannill, 87, American daffodil hybridizer, president of the American Horticultural Society.
- Vithal Patil, 86, Indian cricketer.
- Peder I. Ramsrud, 91, Norwegian politician.
- Stuart Vaughan, 88, American theatre director, prostate cancer.
- Alex Wedderspoon, 83, British Anglican priest, Dean of Guildford (1987–2001).
- Vital João Geraldo Wilderink, 82, Dutch-born Brazilian Roman Catholic prelate, Bishop of Itaguaí (1980–1998).
- Jack Woolf, 90, American educator, President of the University of Texas at Arlington (1959–1968).
- Kin Maung Yin, 76, Burmese artist.

=== 11 ===
- Horaţiu Badiţă, 37, Romanian Olympic swimmer.
- Joe Becker, 82, American Olympic cyclist (1956).
- Glenn Britt, 65, American businessman, melanoma.
- Michael Brown, 93, American songwriter.
- Ruby Dee, 91, American actress (Decoration Day, American Gangster, Do the Right Thing) and civil rights activist, Emmy winner (1991).
- Rafael Frühbeck de Burgos, 80, Spanish conductor and composer, cancer.
- Charles Gautier, 69, French politician, Senator for Loire-Atlantique (2001–2011), colon cancer.
- Carlyn Halde, 89, American medical mycologist.
- Claude Horan, 96, American artist and surfer, coined the term "Steamer Lane".
- Susan B. Horwitz, 59, American computer scientist, stomach cancer.
- Kunie Iwahashi, 79, Japanese novelist, peritonitis.
- Dan Knott, 95, Australian rules footballer (Collingwood, Richmond).
- Mipham Chokyi Lodro, 61, Chinese Tibetan Buddhist teacher, 14th Shamarpa of the Karma Kagyu sect, heart attack.
- Juan López Hita, 69, Spanish footballer (Algeciras, Sevilla).
- Keshav Malik, 89, Indian poet and critic.
- Benjamin Mophatlane, 41, South African information technology executive, CEO of Business Connexion Group (since 2007), cardiac arrest.
- Haobam Ongbi Ngangbi Devi, 89, Indian classical dancer and musician.
- Gilles Ségal, 82, French actor and playwright.
- Harilal Shah, 71, Kenyan cricket player (East Africa) and manager (national team), captain (1975).
- Carlton Sherwood, 67, American soldier, journalist (1980 Pulitzer Prize team at Gannett) and filmmaker (Stolen Honor), heart failure.
- Ernest Tursunov, 78, Kyrgyzstani poet and translator.
- Paul Wingard, 84, American politician.

=== 12 ===
- Richard Arnowitt, 86, American physicist.
- Don Bennett, 80, English cricket player and coach (Middlesex).
- Lilian Benningsen, 89, Austrian operatic mezzo-soprano and contralto.
- Stephen Berg, 79, American poet.
- Gabriel Bernal, 58, Mexican boxer, WBC Flyweight Champion (1984).
- Horacio Cordero, 68, Argentine painter, sculptor and ceramicist.
- Predhuman K Joseph Dhar, Indian author, social worker and a writer.
- Nabil Hemani, 34, Algerian footballer (JS Kabylie, ES Sétif, national team), fall.
- Dan Jacobson, 85, South African writer and academic.
- Kefee, 34, Nigerian gospel singer, lung failure.
- Julian Koenig, 93, American advertising copywriter.
- Carla Laemmle, 104, American actress (The Phantom of the Opera, The Broadway Melody, Dracula), natural causes.
- Gunnel Linde, 89, Swedish author.
- Tom Lloyd-Evans, 73, British astronomer.
- Donald Macaulay, Baron Macaulay of Bragar, 80, British politician and life peer.
- Khagen Mahanta, 71, Indian folk singer, cardiac ailment.
- Enzo Pastor, 32, Filipino race-car driver, shot.
- Joe Pittman, 60, American baseball player (Houston Astros, San Diego Padres).
- Shaktipada Rajguru, 92, Indian Bengali language writer.
- Pat Rosier, 72, New Zealand writer.
- Frank Schirrmacher, 54, German journalist, writer and newspaper publisher (Frankfurter Allgemeine Zeitung), heart attack.
- Jimmy Scott, 88, American jazz singer.
- Willie Sheelor, 86, American Negro league baseball player.
- Paul Silva, 91, American biologist.
- Gerald Westbury, 86, English surgeon.
- Yoo Byung-eun, 73, Japanese-born South Korean religious leader and businessman. (body found on this date)

=== 13 ===
- Robin Amis, 82, British author, poet, publisher, editor and translator.
- Mark Ballinger, 65, American baseball player (Cleveland Indians).
- António Silva Cardoso, 86, Angolan politician.
- Neville Charlton, 85, Australian rugby league footballer.
- Michael Coetzee, 54, South African anti-apartheid activist and civil servant, cancer.
- Mahdi Elmandjra, 81, Moroccan economist and futurologist.
- Gyula Grosics, 88, Hungarian football player (Tatabánya, Budapest Honvéd, national team) and manager, Olympic champion (1952).
- Willie Harvey, 84, Scottish footballer (Kilmarnock).
- Ralph Hennessy, 95, Canadian vice admiral.
- John Michael Ingram, 83, British fashion designer.
- Abdallah Kamal, 49, Egyptian newspaper journalist, editor, author and politician, MP, heart attack.
- Jim Keays, 67, Australian rock musician (The Masters Apprentices), pneumonia as a complication of multiple myeloma.
- David MacLennan, 65, Scottish actor and theatre producer, founded 7:84, motor neurone disease.
- Chuck Noll, 82, American football player (Cleveland Browns) and Hall of Fame coach (Pittsburgh Steelers), most coached Super Bowl wins (IX, X, XIII, XIV), natural causes.
- Robert Peters, 89, American poet, playwright, editor and stage actor, natural causes.
- Richard Rockefeller, 65, American billionaire physician, plane crash.
- Jack Roeser, 90, American engineer, manufacturing executive and political activist.
- Sara Widén, 33, Swedish opera singer (Royal Swedish Opera), cancer.

=== 14 ===
- Bob Campbell, 83, English wildlife photographer.
- Alberto Cañas Escalante, 94, Costa Rican writer, journalist and politician, MP for San José (1962–1966, 1994–1998), complications following surgery.
- Alex Chandre de Oliveira, 36, Brazilian footballer (Hangzhou Greentown), heart attack.
- Ernie Cheatham, 84, American officer and football player.
- Isabelle Collin Dufresne, 78, French-born American actress (I, a Man), artist, author and model (Andy Warhol), cancer.
- Irene Forbes, 65, Cuban Olympic fencer (1972).
- David Gardner-Medwin, 77, British physician, leukemia.
- Magdolna Gulyás, 64, Hungarian Olympic basketball player.
- Ágnes Gajdos-Hubai, 66, Hungarian Olympic volleyball player.
- José Gómez, 70, Spanish Olympic cyclist (1968).
- John Geoffrey Jones, 85, British judge.
- Sam Kelly, 70, British actor ('Allo 'Allo!, Porridge), cancer.
- Robert Lebeck, 85, German photojournalist.
- Steve London, 83, American television and film actor and attorney.
- Francis Matthews, 86, English film and television actor (Captain Scarlet and the Mysterons, Paul Temple, Heartbeat).
- Jamie McEwan, 61, American Olympic bronze medallist slalom canoeist (1972).
- Ivor Mendonca, 79, Guyanese cricketer (West Indies), throat and prostate cancer.
- Terry Richards, 81, British actor and stuntman (Raiders of the Lost Ark, Tomorrow Never Dies, The Princess Bride).
- James E. Rogers, 75, American educator and media owner (KSNV-DT, IWCC), Chancellor of Nevada System of Higher Education (2005–2009), cancer.
- Telangana Shakuntala, 63, Indian film and stage actress, cardiac arrest.
- Seymour Slive, 93, American art historian.
- Rodney Thomas, 41, American football player (Texas A&M Aggies, Tennessee Titans), heart attack.
- Maria Wonenburger, 86, Spanish mathematician.

=== 15 ===
- Fathia al-Assal, 81, Egyptian playwright and activist.
- Jacques Bergerac, 87, French actor (Les Girls).
- György Bokor, 85, Hungarian Olympic basketball player.
- Giancarlo Danova, 75, Italian footballer.
- Nalini Prava Deka, 70, Indian author.
- Larry Dupree, 70, American football player, heart attack.
- Ray Fox, 98, American Hall of Fame NASCAR engine builder and team owner (Junior Johnson, Cale Yarborough), pneumonia.
- Sardar Fazlul Karim, 89, Pakistani-Bangladeshi politician, political prisoner, academic and literary translator, member of the CAP, multiple organ failure.
- Casey Kasem, 82, American radio disc jockey (American Top 40) and voice actor (Scooby-Doo, Super Friends), Lewy body dementia.
- Daniel Keyes, 86, American author (Flowers for Algernon), complications from pneumonia.
- Andrei Kharlov, 45, Russian chess grandmaster.
- Kutho, 61, Burmese comedian and film director.
- John G. King, 88, English-born American physicist and professor (MIT), heart and renal failure.
- Maury Meyers, 82, American politician, Mayor of Beaumont, Texas (1978–1982, 1986–1990), Parkinson's disease.
- Olavi Nikkilä, 92, Finnish politician.
- Nick Nostro, 83, Italian film director.
- Petrus Oellibrandt, 78, Belgian racing cyclist.
- Olli Partanen, 91, Finnish discus thrower.
- Emile Riachi, 87, Lebanese orthopaedic surgeon.
- Moise Safra, 79, Syrian-born Brazilian billionaire financier, founder and chairman of Banco Safra, Parkinson's disease.

=== 16 ===
- Charles Barsotti, 80, American cartoonist (The New Yorker), brain cancer.
- César Benetti, 90, Argentine Olympic swimmer.
- Plácido Bilbao, 73, Spanish footballer.
- Pierre D'Archambeau, 87, Belgian-born American violinist.
- Carol Kreeger Davidson, 85, American sculptor.
- Yvonne Dold-Samplonius, 77, Dutch mathematician and historian.
- Tony Gwynn, 54, American Hall of Fame baseball player (San Diego Padres), salivary gland cancer.
- Thore Heramb, 97, Norwegian painter and illustrator.
- Liselotte Marti, 58, Swiss Olympic gymnast.
- Stephen A. Mikulak, 65, American politician.
- Maria Perosino, 52, Italian author and art historian, tumor.
- J. M. Rajaratnam, 86, Sri Lankan accountant and executive (Singer Corporation).
- Cándido Muatetema Rivas, 54, Equatoguinean politician and diplomat, Prime Minister (2001–2004), Ambassador to Germany (since 2005).
- Thérèse Vanier, 91, British doctor.
- Stephen Walker, 86, Australian sculptor.

=== 17 ===
- Yury Bayakovsky, 76, Soviet and Russian scientist.
- Asher Ben-Natan, 93, Austrian-born Israeli diplomat, Director General of the Ministry of Defense (1959–1965), Ambassador to Germany (1965–1970) and France (1970–1974).
- Haig Bosmajian, 86, American writer.
- Patsy Byrne, 80, English actress (Blackadder II).
- Éric Dewailly, 59, Canadian medical researcher, landslide.
- Wolfram Dorn, 89, German politician.
- Paul England, 85, Australian race car driver.
- Ray Evans, 74, Australian business executive and political activist, co-founder of the Lavoisier Group.
- Anthony Goldschmidt, 71, American graphic designer and poster artist (E.T. the Extra-Terrestrial, The Dark Knight, Cocoon), liver cancer.
- Igor Korneluyk, 37, Russian state television correspondent, mortar strike.
- Mario Llamas, 86, Mexican tennis player.
- Stanley Marsh 3, 76, American artist and philanthropist, patron of Cadillac Ranch.
- John McClure, 84, American Grammy Award-winning record producer.
- Barry Moss, 74, American film casting director (Friday the 13th, Beavis and Butt-head Do America, The Cosby Show), heart failure.
- Peter J. Notaro, 79, American judge, member of the New York Supreme Court (1991–2005), stroke.
- Arnold S. Relman, 91, American physician, editor (New England Journal of Medicine) and health care activist, melanoma.
- Jorge Romo, 90, Mexican footballer (national team).
- Rodrigo Ruiz, 84, Costa Rican Olympic sports shooter.
- Anton Voloshin, 25–26, Russian sound engineer, mortar strike.
- Jeffry Wickham, 80, British actor (The Remains of the Day, Scoop, Ali G Indahouse).
- Larry Zeidel, 86, Canadian hockey player (Detroit Red Wings, Chicago Blackhawks, Philadelphia Flyers), complications from heart failure and kidney problems.

=== 18 ===
- David Cobb, 93, British marine artist.
- Leo De Maeyer, 86, Belgian physical chemist.
- Lynn DeJac, 50, American exonerated prisoner, cancer.
- Arque Dickerson, 91, American fighter pilot (Tuskegee Airmen).
- Rezaul Bari Dina, 62, Bangladeshi politician.
- Sergei Dolgov, 59, Ukrainian-Russian journalist, murdered.
- Michael Frederick, 87, Barbadian cricketer.
- John Ruthell Henry, 63, American serial killer, execution by lethal injection.
- Stephanie Kwolek, 90, American chemist, inventor of Kevlar.
- Allan Maas, 91, Australian footballer (North Melbourne).
- Johnny Mann, 85, American composer, Grammy Award-winning arranger ("Up, Up and Away") and singer (Alvin and the Chipmunks).
- Claire Martin, 100, Canadian author.
- Itche Menahem, 74–75, Israeli football player and manager.
- John E. Miller, 85, American politician, member (1958–1998) and Speaker (1979–1980) of the Arkansas House of Representatives.
- Márcio Moreira, 67, Brazilian advertising executive, complications from heart surgery.
- James Nelson, 82, American sound editor (Five Easy Pieces, The Exorcist) and film producer (Star Wars).
- Vladimir Popovkin, 56, Russian military officer, head of the Federal Space Agency (2011–2013).
- Ces Renwick, 89, New Zealand cricketer.
- Horace Silver, 85, American jazz pianist (Song for My Father, Blowin' the Blues Away), natural causes.
- Luraine Tansey, 96, American slide librarian.

=== 19 ===
- Tahira Asif, 52–53, Pakistani politician, member of the National Assembly (#52 Reserved Women's Sindh seat), shot.
- Oskar-Hubert Dennhardt, 98, German army and air force officer, World War II Wehrmacht major awarded Knight's Cross with Oak Leaves, general in the Bundeswehr.
- Gerry Goffin, 75, American Hall of Fame lyricist ("Will You Love Me Tomorrow", "The Loco-Motion", "Go Away Little Girl", "Take Good Care of My Baby").
- Charlotte Greig, 59, British novelist and singer.
- Joe Kopnisky, 78, American football player and coach.
- Shrenik Kasturbhai Lalbhai, 88, Indian industrialist.
- James A. Lantz, 92, American politician, member of the Ohio House of Representatives, Speaker (1959–1961).
- Marilyn Levy, 92, American chemist, heart failure.
- Alan Moller, 64, American meteorologist and tornado chaser, Alzheimer's disease.
- Daniel Nazareth, 66, Indian composer and conductor.
- James Pitts, 93, American chemist, academic and civil servant, natural causes.
- William Reid, 87, Scottish military historian.
- Bill Renna, 89, American baseball player (New York Yankees, Boston Red Sox, Philadelphia Athletics/Kansas City Athletics).
- John Schiffer, 68, American politician, member of the Wyoming Senate (since 1993), liver cancer.
- Avraham Shalom, 86, Austrian-born Israeli security official, Director of the Shin Bet (1980–1986), commander in the capture of Adolf Eichmann and the Bus 300 affair.
- Ibrahim Touré, 28, Ivorian footballer (Misr El-Makasa SC, Al-Safa' SC), cancer.
- Guy Trottier, 73, Canadian ice hockey player (New York Rangers, Toronto Maple Leafs), cancer.

=== 20 ===
- Anne Arnold, 89, American sculptor.
- Jim Bamber, 66, British cartoonist, cancer.
- David Brown, 84, British musicologist.
- Oberdan Cattani, 95, Brazilian footballer (Sociedade Esportiva Palmeiras).
- Nev Cottrell, 87, Australian rugby union player.
- Handel Greville, 92, Welsh rugby union player (national team).
- Philip Hollom, 102, British ornithologist.
- Florica Lavric, 52, Romanian rower, Olympic champion (1984), cancer.
- Amalia Miranzo, 74, Spanish politician, Senator for Cuenca (1977–1986).
- Tom Mooney, 79, American-born Canadian football player (Montreal Alouettes) and coach.
- Gerald Ratner, 100, American lawyer.
- Norman Sheffield, 75, British rock drummer (The Hunters), recording facility co-owner (Trident Studios) and manager (Queen), cancer.
- Murat Sökmenoğlu, 69, Turkish politician, MP for Hatay Province (1983–1989) and Istanbul (1999–2002).
- Jaroslav Walter, 75, Czech ice hockey player (national team), Olympic bronze medalist (1964).

=== 21 ===
- Tritobia Hayes Benjamin, 69, American art historian and educator.
- Gerry Conlon, 60, Northern Irish author and human rights activist, Guildford Four member wrongfully convicted of the Guildford pub bombings, lung cancer.
- Peter de Rome, 89, American filmmaker (Adam & Yves), natural causes.
- Robert Gardner, 88, American anthropologist and documentary filmmaker.
- John Heslop, 89, New Zealand surgeon and sports administrator.
- Roland Hill, 93, German-born British journalist and biographer.
- Yozo Ishikawa, 88, Japanese politician, Director General of the Defense Agency, member of the House of Representatives for Tokyo, acute respiratory failure.
- Anthony Jacobs, Baron Jacobs, 82, British peer and automobile executive, Chairman of the BSM (1973–1990).
- Walter Kieber, 83, Liechtenstein politician, Prime Minister (1974–1978).
- Roman Laskowski, 78, Polish academic.
- Standish Lawder, 78, American film director.
- Doreen Miller, Baroness Miller of Hendon, 81, British politician and life peer.
- Rose Marie Muraro, 83, Brazilian sociologist.
- Sir Philip Myers, 83, British police officer, Chief Constable of North Wales Police (1974–1982).
- Jimmy C. Newman, 86, American country music singer, cancer.
- Irajá Damiani Pinto, 94, Brazilian paleontologist.
- Aleksandr Shadrin, 25, Uzbekistani footballer, gastric ulcer.
- Bob Soleau, 73, American football player (Pittsburgh Steelers).
- Wong Ho Leng, 54, Malaysian politician, MP for Sibu (2010–2013), Sarawak MLA for Bukit Assek (1996–2001, since 2006), brain cancer.
- Bruno Zumino, 91, Italian particle physicist (CERN, UC-B), developed Wess-Zumino and WZW models, recipient of the Max Planck Medal (1989) and Humboldt Prize (1992).

=== 22 ===
- Abdul Wahab Adam, 75, Ghanaian Islamic religious leader.
- Fouad Ajami, 68, Lebanese-born American political scientist and author, prostate cancer.
- Werner Biskup, 72, German footballer.
- Felix Dennis, 67, British poet and publisher, founder of Dennis Publishing, throat cancer.
- Rigoberto Guzmán, 82, Salvadoran football player and manager (national team), and teacher.
- Teenie Hodges, 68, American rhythm and blues guitarist (Hi Rhythm Section) and songwriter ("Take Me to the River", "Love and Happiness"), complications from emphysema.
- Lewis Kent, 86, Yugoslavian-born Australian politician.
- Matin Ahmed Khan, 93, Pakistani academic, Dean and Director of the Institute of Business Administration (1972–1977).
- Grzegorz Knapp, 35, Polish speedway and ice speedway rider, race collision.
- Washington Malianga, 88, Zimbabwean militant and political activist, founding member of ZANU and ZANLA.
- Rama Narayanan, 65, Indian film director, producer and politician, Tamil Nadu MLA for Karaikudi (1989–1994), kidney failure.
- Jennifer Wynne Reeves, 51, American painter, brain tumor.
- Steve Rossi, 82, American comedian (Allen & Rossi), cancer.
- Chuck Tatum, 87, American soldier, World War II Marine Iwo Jima combatant, provided source material for The Pacific.
- Grayce Uyehara, 94, American social worker and activist.
- Arif Valiyev, 70, Azerbaijani politician, Chairman of the State Statistics Committee (since 1993).

=== 23 ===
- Conrad Brann, 88, German linguist.
- Quinton-Steele Botes, 54, Namibian sports administrator, multiple myeloma.
- Małgorzata Braunek, 67, Polish actress (The Big Night Bathe), cancer.
- Nancy Garden, 76, American writer (Annie on My Mind) and LGBT activist, heart attack.
- Lantra Fernando, 57, Sri Lankan cricketer.
- Michael Intriligator, 76, American economist, melanoma.
- Marie Jacq, 94, French politician.
- Ichirō Komatsu, 63, Japanese civil servant and diplomat, Director-General of the Cabinet Legislation Bureau (2013–2014), Ambassador to France and Switzerland.
- Euros Lewis, 72, Welsh cricketer (Glamorgan, Sussex).
- Michael K. Locke, 61, American politician, member of the Tennessee House of Representatives (2002), traffic collision.
- Paula Kent Meehan, 82, American hair products executive, newspaper owner (Beverly Hills Courier) and philanthropist, co-founder of Redken.
- Charles R. Moore, 79, American Methodist minister, suicide by self-immolation.
- I. N. Murthy, 89, Indian film director.
- Glenn Percy, 85, American football coach (Ottawa University).
- Steve Viksten, 53, American television writer (Hey Arnold!, Rugrats, The Simpsons) and voice actor, intracranial hemorrhage.
- Magnus Wassén, 93, Swedish sailor, Olympic bronze medalist (1952).
- Borys Yakovlev, 68, Ukrainian race walker.

=== 24 ===
- Belfon Aboikoni, 74, Surinamese Saramaka chieftain.
- Gladys Asmah, 74, Ghanaian politician.
- Carlos F. Barbas III, 49, American biologist, cancer.
- Sanedhip Bhimjee, 44, Mauritian dancer, pancreatic cancer.
- John Clement, 85, Canadian politician, Ontario MPP for Niagara Falls (1971–1975).
- Donald Allan Darling, 99, American statistician.
- Jacqueline Jarrett Goodnow, 89, Australian cognitive psychologist.
- Olga Kotelko, 95, Canadian athlete and book subject, intracranial brain hemorrhage.
- Shogo Kubo, 54, Japanese-American skateboarder (Z-Boys), brain aneurysm.
- Joachim Lambek, 91, German-born Canadian mathematician (Lambek–Moser theorem).
- Marilyn Fisher Lundy, 89, American businesswoman and philanthropist.
- Bhabini Mahato, Indian Bengali freedom fighter and activist.
- Joanne Marrow, 69, American clinical psychologist, renal cell carcinoma.
- Lee McBee, 63, American blues musician.
- Mary Ellen McCaffree, 96, American politician, member of the Washington House of Representatives (1963–1971).
- Paolo Salvati, 75, Italian painter.
- Richard Sharp, 67, American automotive retail and electronics executive, CEO of Circuit City (1986–2000), founder of CarMax, complications from Alzheimer's disease.
- David Taylor, 60, Scottish lawyer, Chief Executive of the SFA, General Secretary of UEFA.
- Ramón José Velásquez, 97, Venezuelan politician, Acting President (1993–1994).
- Chip Wadena, 75, American Ojibwe tribal executive, Chairman of the White Earth Indian Reservation (1976–1996).
- Eli Wallach, 98, American actor (The Good, the Bad and the Ugly, The Magnificent Seven, Baby Doll), Tony winner (1951).
- Johnnie Mac Walters, 94, American civil servant and lawyer, Commissioner of Internal Revenue (1971–1973).

=== 25 ===
- Viktor Blažič, 85, Slovene journalist and dissident.
- Hubert Bourdy, 57, French equestrian, Olympic bronze medalist (1988, 1992).
- Salwa Bughaighis, 51, Libyan human rights activist, revolutionary and lawyer, member of the National Transitional Council, shot.
- Nigel Calder, 82, British science writer (New Scientist) and television screenwriter, recipient of the Kalinga Prize (1972).
- Hirut Desta, 84, Ethiopian royal.
- Johnny Fantham, 75, English footballer (Sheffield Wednesday).
- Derek Fielding, 84, Australian librarian and author.
- Donald E. Fuoss, 91, American football and basketball coach.
- Ragnhild Hilt, 68, Norwegian actress.
- Sir Harry Hookway, 92, British civil servant, Chief Executive of the British Library (1973–1984).
- Etta Hulme, 90, American editorial cartoonist (Fort Worth Star-Telegram).
- Ann Mercy Hunt, 75, Welsh chemist and medical researcher.
- Arvid Jacobsen, 75, Norwegian newspaper editor (Avisenes Nyhetsbyrå, Dagsavisen).
- Ana María Matute, 88, Spanish writer, winner of the Miguel de Cervantes Prize (2010), heart attack.
- James Rogers Miller Jr., 83, American judge, member of the U.S. District Court for Maryland, heart failure.
- A. C. Murali Mohan, 54, Indian actor, suicide by hanging.
- Walter B. Parker, 87, American civil servant and policy advisor, investigated the Exxon Valdez oil spill.
- Paul Patterson, 70, American neuroscientist and autism researcher, discovered further role of LIF in brain functioning.
- Ivan Plyushch, 72, Ukrainian politician, Chairman of the Verkhovna Rada (1990, 1991–1994, 2000–2002), cancer.
- Abdulalim A. Shabazz, 87, American mathematician.

=== 26 ===
- Lidiya Alekseyeva, 89, Russian basketball player and Hall of Fame coach (national team), Olympic champion team (1976, 1980).
- Howard Baker, 88, American politician and diplomat, Senator from Tennessee (1967–1985), Senate Majority Leader (1981–1985), White House Chief of Staff (1987–1988), complications from a stroke.
- Terry Blair, 67, American politician, member of the Ohio House of Representatives (since 2009).
- Barry Cole, 77, British poet.
- Bernard Etkin, 96, Canadian scientist.
- Bill Frank, 76, American Hall of Fame CFL football player (Winnipeg Blue Bombers).
- Jay O. Glerum, 74, American theatre consultant and author.
- Ron Hall, 68, Australian NTFA football player (Scottsdale), heart attack.
- Nina Hoekman, 49, Ukrainian-born Dutch draughts player and coach, breast cancer.
- Rollin King, 83, American airline executive, co-founder of Southwest Airlines, complications from a stroke.
- Wolf Koenig, 86, German-born Canadian filmmaker (Lonely Boy).
- Bob Mischak, 81, American football player (New York Giants, New York Titans, Oakland Raiders).
- Mary Rodgers, 83, American composer (Once Upon a Mattress) and children's author (Freaky Friday), heart ailment.
- Julius Rudel, 93, Austrian-born American Grammy Award-winning conductor and director (New York City Opera, Buffalo Philharmonic Orchestra).
- Thomas Terputac, 87, American judge.
- Vins, 70, Indian cartoonist.
- Moacyr José Vitti, 73, Brazilian Roman Catholic prelate, Archbishop of Curitiba (since 2004), heart attack.

=== 27 ===
- José Emilio Amores, 95, Mexican cultural promoter and teacher.
- Gilbert Ashwell, 97, American biochemist and medical researcher, pneumonia.
- Edmond Blanchard, 60, Canadian politician and judge, New Brunswick MLA for Campbellton, Chief Justice of the CMAC.
- Fred Brown, 70, American politician, member of the Alaska House of Representatives (1974–1982).
- Jim Bullions, 90, Scottish footballer.
- John Dalgleish, 73, Australian footballer.
- Joseph C. Flay, 82, American philosopher.
- P. N. Furbank, 94, British writer and literary critic.
- Miguel Ángel García Domínguez, 82, Mexican politician, MP (2003–2006).
- Allen Grossman, 82, American poet (Bollingen Prize), complications from Alzheimer's disease.
- Flor Hayes, 70, Irish Gaelic footballer (Cork).
- Quintin Johnstone, 99, American legal scholar.
- Tymon Mabaleka, 65, Zimbabwean footballer (national team).
- Amaro Macedo, 100, Brazilian botanist and plant collector.
- Leslie Manigat, 83, Haitian politician, President (1988), complications from a stroke.
- Violet Milstead, 94, Canadian aviator.
- Bernard Ferdinand Popp, 96, American Roman Catholic prelate, Auxiliary Bishop of San Antonio (1983–1993).
- Petter Schramm, 58, Norwegian poet.
- Rachid Solh, 88, Lebanese politician, Prime Minister (1974–1975, 1992), MP for Beirut (1960–1974).
- Rex Whitehead, 65, Australian cricket umpire, complications from a stroke.
- Bobby Womack, 70, American Hall of Fame R&B singer ("Harry Hippie") and songwriter ("I Can Understand It").

=== 28 ===
- Seymour Barab, 93, American composer and cellist.
- Guido Boni, 80, Italian cyclist.
- Jim Brosnan, 84, American baseball player (Cincinnati Reds, Chicago Cubs).
- Joe Dooley, Irish hurler (Offaly).
- Lois Geary, 84, American actress (The Last Stand, Silverado, The Astronaut Farmer).
- Hedley Kett, 100, British World War II submariner.
- Visitacao Lobo, 68, Indian footballer.
- George Morrison, 86, American drama teacher.
- Antonio José Ramírez Salaverría, 96, Venezuelan Roman Catholic prelate, Bishop of Maturín (1958–1994).
- Jeffrey Ressner, 56, American entertainment journalist (Rolling Stone, Time, Politico), heart failure.
- Brian Roe, 75, British cricketer (Somerset).
- Hussein Shire, 85, Ugandan-born Somali transportation and agricultural executive.
- Melvin M. Spence, 87, American politician.
- Meshach Taylor, 67, American actor (Designing Women, Mannequin, Ned's Declassified School Survival Guide), colorectal cancer.

=== 29 ===
- Maher Abd al-Rashid, 72, Iraqi army general.
- Sixto Batista Santana, 82, Cuban military officer and politician.
- Barbara Brunton, 86, Australian actress.
- Damian D'Oliveira, 53, South African-born English cricketer (Worcestershire), cancer.
- Sir John Freeland, 86, British diplomat and lawyer.
- Dermot Healy, 66, Irish poet, novelist and playwright.
- Paul Horn, 84, American Grammy Award-winning jazz and new age musician.
- Abul Hussain, 91, Bangladeshi poet.
- Philip Lutzenkirchen, 23, American football player (Auburn Tigers), traffic collision.
- Don Matheson, 84, American actor (Falcon Crest, General Hospital, Land of the Giants), lung cancer.
- Sir Cameron Moffat, 84, British Army officer and doctor, Director General Army Medical Services (1984–1987), Surgeon-General (1985–1987).
- Robin Neill, 82, Canadian economic historian.
- Robert Reimann, 77, American rear admiral.
- Walter Roberts, 97, Austrian-born American writer, lecturer, and government official.
- Dick Shane, 81, American actor (The Virginian) and stuntman.

=== 30 ===
- Pierre Bec, 92, French Occitan language poet and linguist.
- Danny Canning, 88, Welsh footballer (Swansea Town).
- Frank Cashen, 88, American baseball executive (Baltimore Orioles, New York Mets), complications from heart failure.
- Anton Cassar, 90, Maltese journalist, founder and first editor of L-Orizzont.
- Bobby Castillo, 59, American baseball player (Los Angeles Dodgers, Minnesota Twins), cancer.
- Sultanul Kabir Chowdhury, 68, freedom fighter, lawyer and politician, heart disease.
- Álvaro Corcuera, 56, Mexican Roman Catholic priest, Director of the Legion of Christ (2005–2012), brain tumor.
- Alejandra Da Passano, 66, Argentine actress.
- Gustavo Dávila, 28, Colombian footballer, drowning.
- Alexander H. Flax, 93, American scientist and civil servant.
- Christian Führer, 71, German Protestant pastor and political activist, an organiser of the Monday demonstrations in East Germany, respiratory failure.
- Tomás Galfrascoli, 88, Argentine Olympian
- Bob Hastings, 89, American actor (McHale's Navy, The Munsters, Batman: The Animated Series), prostate cancer.
- Richard Jencks, 93, American broadcasting executive, president of CBS Broadcast Group.
- Kenny Kingston, 87, American psychic and variety show personality, cardiovascular disease.
- Gianni Lancia, 89, Italian industrialist (Lancia).
- Humberto Loayza, 88, Chilean Olympic boxer.
- Piers Mackesy, 89, British historian.
- Petero Mataca, 81, Fijian Roman Catholic prelate, Archbishop of Suva (1976–2012).
- Matt's Scooter, 29, American Standardbred racehorse, euthanized.
- Paul Mazursky, 84, American film director and screenwriter (An Unmarried Woman, Harry and Tonto, Moscow on the Hudson), pulmonary cardiac arrest.
- Ed Messbarger, 82, American basketball coach (Angelo State Rams).
- Peter Pragas, 87, Malaysian composer.
- Jean-Pierre Renouard, 91, French writer, member of the Resistance.
- Frank M. Robinson, 87, American science fiction writer (The Power) and speechwriter (Harvey Milk).
- Maria Luisa Spaziani, 91, Italian poet.
- Željko Šturanović, 54, Montenegrin politician, Prime Minister (2006–2008), lung cancer.
- Jiří Švec, 78, Czech Olympic wrestler.
- Hasan Tawfiq, 70, Egyptian poet and journalist.
- Wei Shoukun, 106, Chinese metallurgist and physical chemist, Vice President of the University of Science and Technology Beijing.
