= Notaro =

Notaro (/noʊˈtɑːroʊ, nə-/) is a surname. Notable people with the surname include:

- Gloria Notaro, Venezuelan ambassador
- Laurie Notaro (born 1965), novelist
- Mario Notaro (born 1950), football manager
- Peter J. Notaro (1935–2014), jurist
- Peter Notaro (born 1956), soccer forward
- Tig Notaro (born 1971), comedian

== See also ==
- Branislav Notaros, American engineer
