= Shri K. Singh =

S. K. Singh was a professor of mathematics from University of Missouri - Kansas City. He received his Ph.D. on the Entire and Meromorphic functions from Aligarh Muslim University in 1953. His advisor was S. M. Shah. Singh was one of the founder fathers and Head of the Department of Mathematics, Karnataka University, Dharwar.

== Sources ==
- Aligarh Muslim University
- Shri K. Singh at the Mathematics Genealogy Project
