= William Pannill =

William Gordon Pannill (March 25, 1927 – June 10, 2014) was an American businessman, textile industry executive, amateur botanist, and noted daffodil hybridizer. Pannill hybridized, named and registered 210 new varieties of daffodils during his life. He was a former president of both the American Daffodil Society and the American Horticultural Society. He also founded the Horticulture Society of South Florida.

Pannill established the American Daffodil Society's Pannill Award in 1997. He went on to win the Pannill Award on three occasions: 1998 for his Homestead hybrid New Penny daffodil, 2003 for his River Queen hybrid daffodil, and 2006 for his New Penny hybrid.

Pannill was born to William Letcher Pannill and Adele Dillard Pannill in Martinsville, Virginia. He was youngest, and only son, of his parents' seven children. His father was considered a pioneer of Martinsville's textile industry, opening the Pannill Knitting Co. in 1925.

William Pannill, a resident of Palm Beach, died at his summer home in Roaring Gap, North Carolina, on June 10, 2014, at the age of 87.
