= Amy C. King =

American mathematics educator

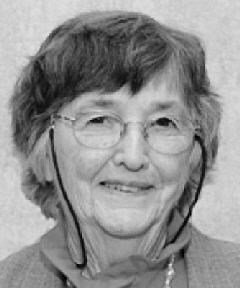

Amy Catheryne Patterson King (December 30, 1928 – June 7, 2014) was an American mathematician and mathematics educator who became Foundation Professor of mathematics at Eastern Kentucky University, and was recognized for her distinguished teaching by the Kentucky Section of the Mathematical Association of America.

== Personal life ==
Amy Catheryne Patterson was born on December 30, 1928, in Douglas, Wyoming. She married Don King, who became a professor of dentistry; they had no children. Her brother, James D. Patterson, was also an academic, a professor of physics at the Florida Institute of Technology.

She became a member of the Centenary United Methodist Church of Lexington, Kentucky. She died on June 7, 2014, of burns and smoke inhalation from a fire at her home in Lexington.

== Education and career ==
King was a graduate of the University of Missouri. She earned a master's degree from Wichita State University in 1960, with the master's thesis Selected methods for solving eigenvalue problems by variational procedures. She joined the Mathematical Association of America in 1961, and coauthored the 1963 book Pathways to Probability: History of the Mathematics of Certainty and Chance with Cecil Byron Read, published by Holt, Rinehart and Winston. She became a mathematics instructor, including stints at Wichita State University, Washburn University, the University of Kansas, and the University of Kentucky.

In later life she returned to graduate study, working with S. M. Shah at the University of Kentucky on transcendental functions of bounded index. She completed her Ph.D. in 1970, with the dissertation A Class of Entire Functions of Bounded Index and Radii of Univalence of Some Functions of Zero Order supervised by Shah. Her work in the early 1970s also included surveying the contributions of women in mathematics.

She taught mathematics at Eastern Kentucky University from 1972 until her retirement as Foundation Professor emerita in 1998.

== Recognition ==
King became the inaugural winner of the annual Award for Distinguished College or University Teaching of Mathematics of the Kentucky Section of the Mathematical Association of America, in 1992. She was named Foundation Professor at Eastern Kentucky University in 1993; this was "the highest honor the school gives to its teachers". A technology-enhanced mathematics classroom at Eastern Kentucky University was named for her in 2011, honoring her role as a "central figure in mathematics education at EKU".

Wichita State University offers a scholarship named for her, as does Eastern Kentucky University.
