= Arque Dickerson =

Tuskegee Airman and industrial designer (1923–2014)

Arque Dickerson was a fighter pilot technical instructor and industrial designers. He was born in 1923 in St. Louis, Missouri. He died on June 18, 2014, and was buried in Arlington National Cemetery.

== Personal life ==
Arque Dickerson was the son of Carroll Dickerson, a trumpet player and member of Cab Calloway's jazz band. Dickerson was married three times.

== Career ==
Arque Dickerson was part of the original group of the Tuskegee Airmen. A year after he joined the Army Air Forces in 1942, he officially and successfully joined the Tuskegee Airmen. The Tuskegee Airmen were a group of Black aviators in the military during WWII. They trained in Alabama at the Tuskegee Army Air Field and as collective they were deployed more than 15,000 times. This earned them multiple Distinguished Flying Crosses and moved to begin the integration of black men and women in the armed forces. Despite never going to combat, he was considered a good fighter pilot and later trained other military pilots.

Arque Dickerson spoke on how he felt joining the army straight out of college and being part of the Tuskegee Airmen, stating how “awe-inspiring” that time was for him. After his time in the military, where he left as a sergeant in 1946, he enrolled in the Pratt Institute where he went onto study industrial design. As an industrial designer he focused on aircraft interiors, working with Queen Elizabeth II, President Robert Mugabe of Zimbabwe and Sweden's royal family. Among those, other of his clients included, "Trans World Airlines, Continental, Eastern, McDonnell, Douglas Helicopter Co., Piedmont Commuter, Republic Express and Virgin Atlantic".

As an industrial designer he focused on aircraft interiors, having designed customs interiors since 1960. He worked alongside engineers to change the design on control panels. His work include "helicopters, private jet planes, and 747s for Northwest Airlines, Canadair, Boeing, Raytheon, and British Aerospace". He believed that "the worst thing you can do is do a design and let things fly apart color and texture-wise".

Before working in aerospace, where he found his "niche", Dickerson worked on designing office furniture and lamps. He has expressed his dislike for lamps. He also worked with other companies designing items that were not related to his industrial design work with airplanes. Working for American Thermos, he designed the first thermos with a handle in the 1950s and while working for Martial and Bars, he designed the Simca Vedette, a French car.
