= Daffodil Society =

UK plant breeding organisation

- Formation: 1898; 128 years ago
- Founded at: Birmingham, England
- Purpose: Breeding of daffodils
- Website: thedaffodilsociety.com
- Formerly called: The Midland Daffodil Society

The Daffodil Society is the oldest organisation dedicated to the breeding of daffodils. The goal of the society, which was founded in Birmingham in 1898 as The Midland Daffodil Society, is to promote the breeding of daffodils. However the society does not register new cultivars, but rather they are registered with the Royal Horticultural Society, headquartered in London.

The Daffodil Society holds an annual daffodil show in Birmingham Botanical Gardens, where the most attractive cultivars are awarded prizes. Many other countries have comparable societies, such as the American Daffodil Society (1954).
