= Ganiyu Akanbi Bello =

Nigerian businessman

Alhaji Ganiyu Akanbi Bello
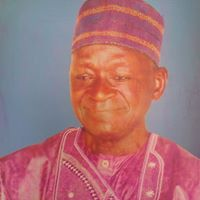
- A portrait of G A Bello in native clothing
- Born: Ganiyu Akanbi Bello; 10 July 1930; Oyo State, Nigeria
- Died: 5 June 2014 (aged 83); Kano, Nigeria
- Cause of death: Assassination
- Resting place: Nassarawa, Kano State, Nigeria
- Occupation: Business man/yoruba leader
- Partner: Sakirat Ayoka Ogabi Bello Widow 1959 – 2014; his death. In 2015, she has since been in a political asylum.
- Children: Tawakalitu Sanusi née Bello; Moriliatu Bisola Sanusi née Bello; Basiratu Biodun Oyefeso née Bello; Nurudeen Bello; Shamsideen Bello
- Parent(s): Abdullahi Yusuf; Sinotu Bello

Alhaji Ganiyu Akanbi Bello (10 July 1930 – 5 June 2014) was a prominent Yoruba community leader and business tycoon.

== Background ==
Dr. Alhaji G A Bello, a Yoruba community ambassador in Kano, was the chairman and chief executive of Criss Cross Ltd. He was popularly known as G A Bello.

Bello was born in Oyo State, Nigeria on 10 July 1930 to Abdullahi Yusuf and Sinota Bello, the second of three children. Both parents died while he was a child and he was sent to live with his uncle who refused to send him to school. He left his uncle and started cutting wood in order to fund his school fees.

Bello married Sakirat Ayoka Ogabi in approximately 1959. Their first child named Tawakalitu Bello Sanusi, was followed by Moriliatu Bisola Bello Sanusi, Basira Biodun Bello Oyefeso, and a son Nurudeen Bello. Between 1966 and 1967, during the Nigerian Civil War, known as the Biafran War, Bello sent his wife and children to Lagos while he remained in Kano. His family returned shortly after to join him, and they had their fifth child, Shamsideen Bello. His sixth child, Fausat Bello, was born around 1970 but died of measles as an infant. They were married until his death in 2014. In 2015, she has since been in a political asylum after the emergence of Mohamadu Buhari as the next president.

In 1950, Bello joined the Nigerian Police under British colonial rule. During the time he was a police officer, his closest friend was Alhaji Ado Bayero, the Chief of the Nigerian Police Force who was later appointed Emir of Kano in 1963. He resigned around 1958 and founded a company which dealt in Building and Civil Engineering.

His company was the first to build a multi-storey building in Kano on Odutola Street which was a residential estate. He later bought his first private residence along Abedee Street Sabon Gari, Kano. He opened the first filling station in Kano in 1968 and behind it he opened a club known as the Criss Cross Club which sold drinks, chicken, and pepper soup. His company built its first hotel, the Criss Cross Hotel, in 1971. His second hotel, known as Gab Hotel, and was built in 1980.

His two eldest daughters, Tawakalitu and Moriliatu, married on the same day in 1988. Tawa married Dr Lukman Sanusi while Morili married Retired Colonel Olawale Sanusi. In 1989, his youngest daughter, Basira, married Sakiru Olanipekun Oyefeso, the founder and managing director of Standard Trust Assurance Company. His eldest son, Nuru, married Salawat Titilope.

From 1990 to 2000, G A Bello was the vice-chairman of the Independent Petroleum Association (IPMAN) in the Kano Nigerian National Petroleum Cooperation (NNPC).

== Personal life ==
=== Education ===
Even though Bello only had a secondary school education, he was believed that tertiary education was of utmost importance. Because of this, and each of his children attended university.

=== Hobbies ===
In the 1970s Bello loved playing golf on the golf course opposite the Daula Hotel along Murtala Mohammed Way. He also sponsored the Black Scorpion Football Club during that time.

== Business life ==
=== Government ===
Bello was an advocate of unity in Kano. He encouraged the government to foster unity between the different tribes in Kano State. He advised the government to encourage Nigerians to stop tribalism and live in harmony. This encouraged the Yorubas to continue to live in Kano. In January 2006, Bello was the acting Oba of the Yoruba Community in Kano State for sixty days.

=== Mosque ===
Bello contributed to many Islamic causes in Kano including the construction of two Juma't Mosques built in Sabon Gari, a non-native's settlement area. The first mosque was built around 1982 at Nomans Land, Kano and it was commissioned by the Emir of Kano, Alhaji Ado Bayero. In early 2000, he built a second mosque, the Ahammadiya Mosque along Emir Road, for the Ahmadiya Muslims.

=== Charity ===
Alhaji Bello donated millions of naira to charity related issues, including the Rotary International. He donated equally generously to communities, Mosques and Churches. This earned him a long list of honorary awards.

== Titles/Awards ==
Bello held many Chieftaincy titles such as: Aarre Egbe Omo Balogun Maiyegun of Ibadanland, Babasaiye of Owu, Abeokuta of Ogun State, and Aarre Basorun Timi Agbale of Ede in Osun State. He was also given an Honorary Doctorate Degree in Business Administration by Kenton University. He once received a Yoruba Ambassador's award for the North from Central Council of Ibaban indigenes CCII inside Mapo Hall, Ibadan.

== Death ==
Bello was murdered a month before his 84th birthday on 5 June 2014 by unknown assailants in Kano. He was buried in his residence at Race Course Road. The deputy Governor of Kano State, Dr Abdullahi Umar Ganduje, paid a condolence visit to Bello's grave on 12 June 2014.

Abubakar Abdurrahman Sadiq was caught by Nigerian police in August 2014 and confessed to the murder. Sadiq had broken into Bello's house to steal money and stabbed him when Bello tried to stop him. Sadiq had previously worked in one of Bello's hotels, but was let go for stealing.
