= Irene Awret =

German artist and writer

- photo from passport issued to Irene Spicker in March 1939
- Born: Irene Spicker; January 30, 1921; Berlin, Germany
- Died: June 6, 2014 (aged 93); Falls Church, Virginia
- Occupations: artist, writer
- Spouse: Azriel Awret

Irene Awret or Irene Spicker (1921–2014) was a German artist, author and Holocaust survivor.

== Biography ==
Awret née Spicker was born on January 30, 1921, in Berlin, Germany. She was the youngest of three children. In 1937, as a result of the Nuremberg Laws, Irene left high school and began studying drawing and painting. Around 1939 she and a sister fled to Belgium, where she stayed for several years. She continued her studies and eventually was able to find work restoring wooden sculptures.

In 1943 Awret was detained by the Gestapo in occupied Belgium and subsequently sent to the Mechelen transit camp. She was assigned to the camp art workshop, where she produced signs and armbands. Awret was also required to paint portraits of Nazi officers.

While in the camp, she met Azriel Awret (1910–2011), fellow artist and prisoner. The two married in late 1944 after the liberation of Mechelen.

The couple and their children emigrated to Safed, Israel, in 1949. There they founded an art colony. In the 1970s, the couple moved to the United States and settled in Falls Church, Virginia.

Awret's memoir, They'll Have to Catch Me First: An Artist's Coming of Age in the Third Reich (ISBN 0299188302) was published in 2004 by the University of Wisconsin Press.

Awret died in Falls Church on June 6, 2014.

== Legacy ==
Awret's paintings are included in the collection of the Beit Lohamei Haghetaot (Ghetto Fighters' House Museum). More of the couple's art is located at the Kazerne Dossin: Memoriaal, Museum en Documentatiecentrum over Holocaust en Mensenrechten (Kazerne Dossin Memorial, Museum and Documentation Centre). Awret's 1939 passport is in the United States Holocaust Memorial Museum.

A small selection of Irene Awret's watercolor paintings is installed in a permanent virtual exhibition.
