= Sara Widén =

Swedish opera singer

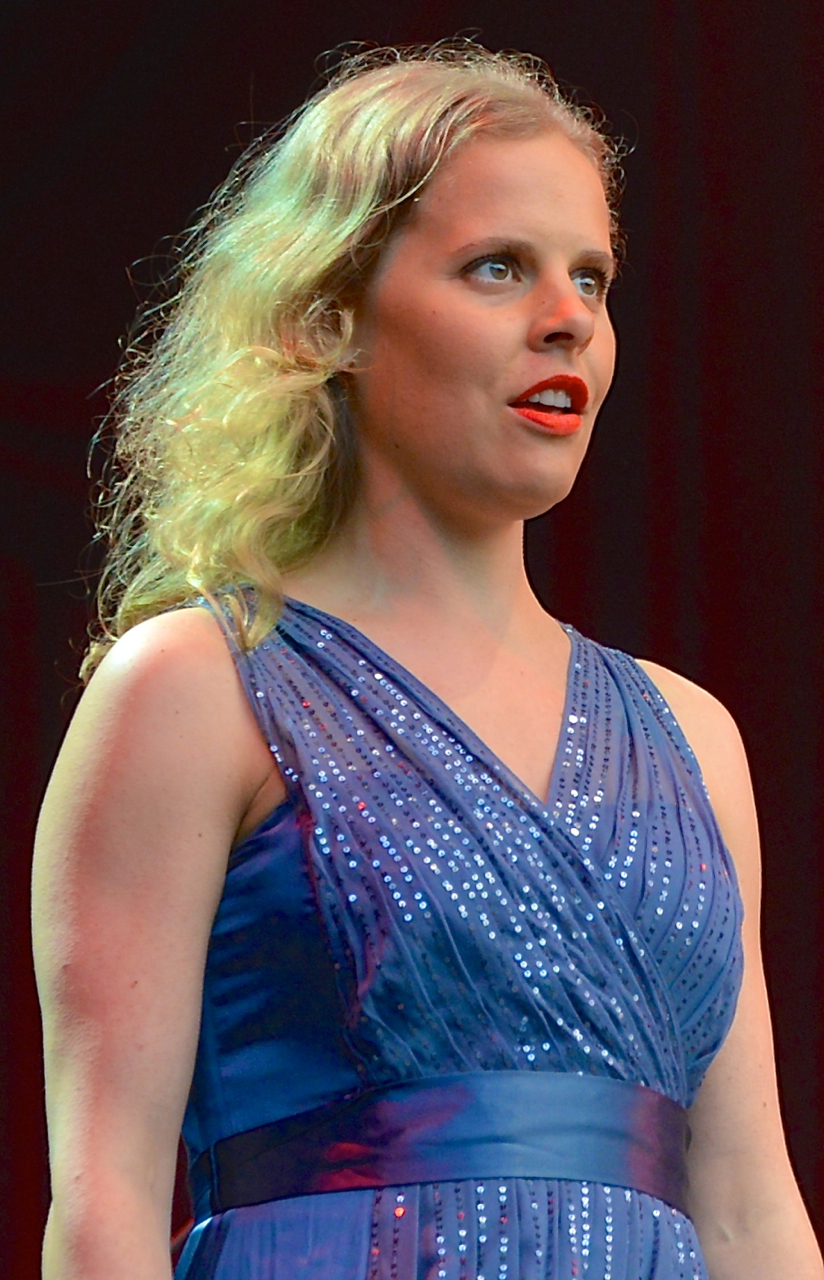
Sara Widén in August 2013.

Sara Kristina Widén (9 May 1981 – 13 June 2014) was a Swedish opera singer (soprano). From 2013 until her death, she was starring in productions by the Royal Swedish Opera.

Widén was born in Halmstad, Halland County. Her younger brother, Jacob (born 1983), is a member of the punk rock band Neverstore.

== Death ==
Widén died from cancer on 13 June 2014 in Stockholm, aged 33.
