= J. William Pope =

American lawyer and politician

James William "Bill" Pope, Jr. (February 2, 1938 – June 8, 2014) was an American lawyer and politician.

Born in Nashville, Tennessee, Pope went to the University of Tennessee and the Cumberland School of Law. He practiced law and worked for the Tennessee Valley Authority. Pope was also involved in the banking business. He served as mayor of Pikeville, Tennessee. In 1967, he served in the Tennessee House of Representatives as a Democrat. He died in Dayton, Tennessee.
