= Heinrich Fasching =

Austrian Roman Catholic bishop

Heinrich Fasching (24 May 1929 – 1 June 2014) was a Roman Catholic bishop.

Ordained to the priesthood in 1954, Fasching was named titular bishop of Acci and auxiliary bishop of the Roman Catholic Diocese of Sankt Pölten in 1993. He retired in 2004.
