= Jean-Pierre Renouard =

French writer

Jean-Pierre Renouard (9 July 1922 – 30 June 2014) was a French writer.

== Biography ==
Renouard was born in Paris in 1922 to a family of French "grands bourgeois". His ancestors include Armand Bertin, Jules Bapst and Renouard du Tinel. Arman Bertin was the founder and owner of the Journal des débats which was the only daily newspaper during the French Revolution of 1789 and further during the whole 19th century. Ingres painted a famous portrait called "monsieur Bertin", which is now in the Louvre. Jules Bapst was the jeweller to the French royal family. One of his masterpieces, the crown of King Charles X, was stolen from the Louvre in 1960 and was never found. Lastly, Renouard du Tinel was a giant swinging a short tree and drinking from a barrel, who fought the Moors (Arabs) along the South coast of France around the year 1000.

His grand mother, Cecile Patinot, gave Joseph Kessel his first assignment for the "Journal des débats". His studies at Janson de Sailly high school were interrupted in May 1940 by the German invasion. His family, having settled in the South of France, Jean Pierre and his younger brother Jacques started resistance activities in September 1941 by delivering several suitcases of hand guns to Jean Guyot, aka Gallois, the leader of several resistance networks. Eventually members of the Sosies network led by Dominique Ponchardier, the two brothers were arrested in May 1944 by the Gestapo and imprisoned at the Fort du Hâ in Bordeaux before being deported to the Neuengamme concentration camp near Hamburg.

His brother Jacques died at age 20 on 31 December 1944 in the Sachsenhausen concentration camp near Berlin. Jean-Pierre Nicolas Renouard was freed by British troops from the Bergen-Belsen concentration camp on 15 April 1945. After a long recovery, he left for the United States and studied at the School of Business Administration of Cornell University, Ithaca, New York. There followed an international career of forty years in the oil industry. From 1975 to 1987 he was president of Copechim France, a company trading in crude oil.

== Publications ==
He is the author of Un Uniforme Rayé d'Enfer published by the Editions du Rocher in 1993 and prefaced by M. Maurice Druon, secretary to the Académie française. This book has been translated into German by historian Raïner Fröbe and published in Germany in 1988 under the title Die Hölle Gestreift and later, under the same title, by the University of Leipzig. The book was also translated into Chinese by M. Fu Yong Qiang and published in Beijing in 2001.

Other than this book, Jean-Pierre Renouard is the author of numerous articles published in Le Déporté and other publications concerning the resistance and deportation.

== Decorations ==
Jean-Pierre Renouard is commandeur de la Légion d'honneur, Médaille de la Résistance, Croix de Guerre 39–45.

== Distinctions ==
Un Uniforme Rayé d'Enfer received an academy prize from the Institut de France and the prix Jean Prévost in 2001. The author was named a member of the Cornell Council in 1989.

== Bibliography ==
- Renouard, Jean-Pierre (6 November 2008). Un costume rayé d'enfer (in French). Pocket. ISBN 978-2-266-17355-1.
- Renouard, Jean-Pierre (16 December 2011). My Stripes Were Earned in Hell: A French Resistance Fighter's Memoir of Survival in a Nazi Prison Camp. Rowman & Littlefield Publishers. ISBN 978-1-4422-1401-9.
- Renouard, Jean-Pierre (2010). 15 Days of Prayer with Saint Vincent de Paul. New City Press. ISBN 978-1-56548-357-6.
