= Carol Kreeger Davidson =

American sculptor (1929–2014)

- Born: Carol Kreeger; May 17, 1929; Chicago, Illinois
- Died: June 16, 2014 (aged 85); Bloomfield, Connecticut, U.S.
- Education: B.F.A. (1967) at University of Hartford Art School; M.F.A. (1974) at Rhode Island School of Design
- Known for: Sculpture
- Movement: Postminimalism
- Spouse: Donald Davidson

Carol Kreeger Davidson (17 May 1929 – 16 June 2014) was an American sculptor known for her Postminimalist style and technique of bending, folding, and bolting material rather than welding.

== Life ==
Carol Kreeger was born in Chicago, Illinois and attended the University of Chicago before transferring her credits to Northwestern University where she graduated with a B.A. in literature. She moved to Hartford, Connecticut after marrying Donald Davidson. In 1959 she broke her back in a horse back riding accident. While in the hospital for nearly a year, friends brought her art books as entertainment. The books inspired her to study art and she began to study sculpture privately with Wolfgang Behl before completing her B.F.A. cum laude, with honors in sculpture, from University of Hartford Art School in 1967. In 1974 she completed her M.F.A. from Rhode Island School of Design.

== Art and career ==
Kreeger Davidson's primarily worked with paper and bronze in her sculpture. She is also known for her painted sculptures made between 1985 and 1988. Kreeger Davidson was represented by Lilia Kuzmicz at Media and Company, Betty Parsons Gallery and Humphrey Fine Art and Design. Her one-person shows include Hudson River Museum, Mary and Leigh Block Museum of Art, Reading Public Museum, National Museum of Women in the Arts, and the New Britain Museum of American Art. She has been a lecturer at Rhode Island School of Design, School of the Art Institute of Chicago, and Northwestern University. In 1984 she was named the first Distinguished Alumna of the University of Hartford Art School and received a ten-year retrospective exhibition at the university's Joseloff Gallery.

She is the recipient of grants from the National Endowment for the Arts, the Asia Foundation, and the Commissions for the Arts of both Connecticut and New York. She is currently retired and lives with her husband in Bloomfield, Connecticut.
