= Roland Hill (journalist) =

British journalist and author

Rowland Hill
- Born: Roland Hess; 2 December 1920; Hamburg, Germany
- Died: 21 June 2014 (aged 93); London, England
- Occupation: Journalist
- Known for: Biographer of Lord Acton
- Father: Rudolf Hess
- Military career
- Allegiance: United Kingdom
- Branch: British Army
- Service years: 194?-45
- Conflicts: World War II

Roland Hill (2 December 1920 – 21 June 2014) was a German-born British journalist and author of the first modern biography of Lord Acton.

He was born in Hamburg to Rudolf Hess (a sugar trader) and to his mother, an opera singer. Both his parents were Jews but they brought Roland up as a Lutheran. After Hitler's rise to power, the family moved successively to Prague, Vienna and then Milan. In 1937, in Vienna, he was received into the Catholic Church. He took up journalism and at the outbreak of the Second World War he was in London, working for Austrian and German newspapers. In 1940 he was briefly interned on the Isle of Man as an enemy alien. He later joined a Scottish Infantry regiment in the British Army, changing his name in case he was captured.

In London, where he died, he worked for The Tablet and as correspondent for the Frankfurter Allgemeine Zeitung, Die Presse and others.

== Works ==
- Lord Acton (Yale University Press, 2000).
- A Time Out of Joint: A Journey from Nazi Germany to Post-War Britain (I B Tauris & Co, 2007).
