= Peter Pragas =

Malaysian composer and musician (1926-2014)

Peter Pragas (1926 – 30 June 2014) was a Malaysian composer and musician. He was considered one of the most prominent composers to hail from the Malaysian state of Sabah. He has been called the "Father of Sabah Modern Music" and the "Father of Sabah Music."

Pragas was born in Penang, British Malaya, in 1926. He moved from Peninsular Malaysia to the Crown Colony of North Borneo (present-day Sabah) in 1956, where he became the first music director of Radio Sabah (now part of Radio Televisyen Malaysia). Pragas has been credited as a strong champion of music in Sabah. He was referred to as the "Father of Sabah Music" in Sabah Quarter Century of Songs, Composers Biographical Data (Volume 1), which was published in 1977.

He released his first instrumental album, "Land Below The Wind," through EMI in 1979. In 1981, Pragas released a dual album, "Sabah Centennial Celebration," to commemorate Sabah's 100 year Centennial Celebration. He also retired from his public career in state radio in 1981 as well.

In 1987, Pragas founded the Sabah Association of Senior Citizens.

In 1999, Peter Pragas was honoured as the "Father of Sabah Modern Music" at a National Day exhibition called "Patriotism 2020," which was held at the Sabah Museum in Kota Kinabalu and was later a conferred a Datukship in 2004, in conjunction with the 58th official birthday celebrations of then-Governor, Tun Ahmadshah Abdullah for his contributions to music and social welfare.

Pragas died on 30 June 2014, at the age of 87. He was predeceased by his wife Helen and youngest daughter Jeanette (who both died 2 years prior in 2012, one after another), and was survived by his living two children, Adrian and Sandra as well as a set of grandchildren. His funeral was held at the Stella Maris Roman Catholic Church in Tanjung Aru, Kota Kinabalu. Pragas was then laid to rest at the St. Joseph's Benevolent Fund Roman Catholic Cemetery, Old Penampang Road in Kampung Dontozidon, Bandar Baru Koidupan, Penampang district.
