= Lynn DeJac =

American woman wrongly convicted of murder

Lynn DeJac Peters (November 20, 1963 – June 18, 2014) was an American woman from Buffalo, New York, who spent 13 years in prison for the murder of her daughter before her conviction was vacated in 2007, making her the first woman to be exonerated of murder on the basis of DNA evidence. She successfully sued the state of New York for wrongful conviction.

== Murder of Crystallynn Girard ==
DeJac's daughter Crystallynn Girard, 13, died near midnight on February 13, 1993, or in the early hours of February 14. She was found naked on her bed and medical examiner ruled that she had been strangled. Crystallynn had cocaine in her system, but the medical examiner determined it was not enough to kill her.

The night of Crystallynn's death, DeJac and her boyfriend of two months, Dennis Donohue, went to a bar and had a large fight, after DeJac discovered he had paid someone to have her followed. DeJac told the police that Donohue had stalked her and murdered her daughter. Another man, Wayne Hudson, who had a history of criminal offenses, claimed that DeJac confessed to him that she had murdered her daughter. Donohue was given immunity to testify against DeJac after he passed a polygraph test. During the trial, prosecutors attacked DeJac's troubled past, which included having Crystallynn when she was just 16, promiscuity and a drinking problem.

In April 1994, DeJac was convicted of second-degree murder for her daughter's death and sentenced to 25 years to life in prison. According to her lawyer, she had been convicted of the murder of her daughter based primarily on evidence from a neighbor who claimed DeJac had confessed the murder. There was no physical or forensic evidence implicating DeJac. DeJac was pregnant with twin boys during the trial and gave birth in jail, and later married their father, Chuck Peters, while still in prison. Prison officials did not allow her any visitation with her newborn children because she continued to proclaim her innocence.

DeJac caught a break when Detective Dennis Delano moved to the Buffalo homicide division and began investigating cold cases with the squad. The four person cold case squad reviewed the unsolved case of Joan Giambra, who in September 1993 was murdered and her 11-year-old daughter nearly killed, strangled and left for dead on top of her mother's body. Another cold case, the 1975 murder of Carol Reed, was also similar. Like Crystallynn, Reed and Giambra were found naked on their backs, strangled. Additionally, all three were connected to Donohue. Donohue and Reed lived in the same apartment building at the time of her death in 1975, and Giambra had casually dated Donohue before breaking up with him shortly before her murder.

In 2007, Hudson recanted his testimony that DeJac had confessed to Crystallynn's murder, but he was seen as an unreliable witness. At the same time, however, new forensic analysis revealed the presence of Donohue's DNA at the crime scenes for both Crystallynn and Giambra.

On November 28, 2007, DeJac's conviction was overturned based on the physical evidence linking the murder to Dennis Donohue. Donohue cannot be tried for the death of Crystallynn Girard, however, as he was granted immunity at her trial. In September 2007, he was arrested for Giambra's murder, 13 years after her death. In May 2008, a jury took only six hours to convict him for Giambra's murder. He was sentenced to 25 years to life in prison.

According to the Innocence Project, DeJac is the first woman to be exonerated of murdering someone on the basis of DNA evidence. A previous case had involved the reversal of the conviction of Paula Grey, who had been convicted as an accomplice to murder, but was cleared when the conviction of the principals was reversed.

Nevertheless, the Erie County prosecutor was quoted as saying he planned to retry DeJac for second degree manslaughter. Later, the prosecutor dropped the case after consulting with a new forensic pathologist, who announced that Crystallynn had died of a cocaine overdose. Both Detective Delano and DeJac were outraged and insisted that Crystallynn was murdered by Donohue, and that the trace amounts of cocaine found could have been transferred by Donohue during her murder. "My daughter was murdered," DeJac said. "There's no question my daughter was murdered."

DeJac's lawyer, Steven M. Cohen represented DeJac in her civil suit against the state of New York and secured a $2.7 million settlement. They also filed a $30 million federal lawsuit against Erie County and the city of Buffalo. A journalist for The Buffalo News commented, "The district attorney's office — in a monumental blunder — granted lifetime immunity to Donohue, who should have been a prime suspect. Instead, DeJac was arrested, convicted and wrongfully imprisoned for 14 years in her daughter's strangulation."

== Death ==
One month after DeJac received her $2.7 million settlement, she was diagnosed with terminal cancer. On June 18, 2014, DeJac died at her home in Buffalo, aged 50. She was survived by her husband and three children. According to her attorney and family, the federal lawsuit against Erie County and the city of Buffalo is going forward.

== See also ==
- List of wrongful convictions in the United States
