= Tarō Naka =

Japanese poet

Tarō Naka (Japanese: 那珂太郎, Hepburn: Naka Tarō; 23 January 1922 – 1 June 2014) was a prize-winning Japanese poet. He was born Shōjirō Fukuda in Hakata, now Fukuoka, on the island of Kyushu in western Japan. At school he read, among others, Sakutarō Hagiwara, Friedrich Nietzsche, Fyodor Dostoevsky, Charles Baudelaire, and the Kyoto School philosopher Kitarō Nishida. In April 1941, he entered Tokyo Imperial University to study Japanese Literature. Some of his earliest poems dealing with the war and its immediate aftermath appeared in his debut collection, Etudes, in 1950, published by his high-school classmate Tokuo Date's Eureka Press.

Between 1957 and 1964, Naka worked on what the critic Shōbin Hirai, among many others, considered his magnum opus, his 1965 collection Ongaku ('Music'). It was published by Shichōsha, Japan's foremost poetry publisher, in a limited edition of four hundred copies. It received widespread critical praise and was awarded the Yomiuri Prize and the Saisei Murō Prize. The collection is characterized by its high degree of attention to the interplay between the visual, phonetic and semantic aspects of words. In 2003, he composed a nō play, Shikōtei ('The First Emperor'), which was performed at the National Noh Theatre on 20 March 2014, a few months before Naka died from pneumonia in June 2014.

An English translation of his work, Music: Selected Poems, was published by Isobar Press in July 2018.
