= Éric Dewailly =

- Éric Dewailly
- Born: 1957
- Died: June 17, 2014 (aged 57)
- Education: University of Lille
- Scientific career
- Fields: Epidemiology
- Workplaces: Laval University

Éric Dewailly (1957 – June 17, 2014) was a Canadian epidemiologist and medical researcher from Quebec. He was particularly notable for his research into human toxicology and the effect of contaminants on the environment in the Arctic. A professor of medicine at Laval University and the Centre hospitalier universitaire de Québec Research Center, he was also a scientific director of the World Health Organization's Collaborative Centre in Environmental Health.

== Biography ==
The son of a gastroenterologist, Dewailly was interested in sociology in his teenage years, but his focus changed to infectious diseases and protecting public health after a trip to the Ivory Coast. Dewailly's education included a degree in medicine from the University of Lille (1982), specialized studies in public health (CES, Amiens, 1983, a residency in community health (Laval University, 1983–85), a master's degree in epidemiology (Laval University, 1987), and a PhD in toxicology (University of Lille, 1990).

During his career, he served as a professor of medicine at Laval University, directed the Laval University Medical Centre's Public Health Research Unit, and was scientific director of the World Health Organization's Collaborative Centre in Environmental Health. He was also a professor and Scientific Director at Centre hospitalier universitaire de Québec Research Center, as well as director of the CIHR funded Nasivvik Centre for Inuit Health.

== Work ==
An epidemiologist specializing specialist in human toxicology, Dewailly's research focused on the impact of oceans on human health, and was noted for his work in the Canadian Arctic. He did much work for the International Network for Circumpolar Health Research.

Dewailly published notable work into breast cancer. In the late 1980s and 1990s, he conducted much research into the breast milk of Inuit women and was concerned with the high levels of chemicals found in it, containing over six times the nationally recommended level of PCBs. He made the discovery by accident after visiting the Inuit peoples in industrialized, heavily polluted Gulf of St. Lawrence in 1987 and testing a midwife from Nunavik. In 1994, he co-authored a paper documenting the unusually high level of cadmium in the blood of Inuit cigarette smokers. He was also knowledgeable about the effects of fats on the heart and human health, and spoke about the dangers of man-made trans fats and them being even worse than saturated fats. He expressed concerns about the calories in the Inuit diet consisting of more than 50% derived from fat. Dewailly once stated that he considered fats to have been "demonized" in the United States.

In 2003, Dewailly contributed to the book Northern Lights Against POPs: Combatting Toxic Threats in the Arctic with Christopher Furgal, writing about the "Discovery of Organic Contaminants in Arctic Peoples" in the 1980s. In 2011 he contributed to the book Oceans and Human Health: Risks and Remedies from the Seas, writing about the "Exposure and effects of seafood-borne contaminants in maritime populations".

== Personal life and death ==
Dewailly was married to Dr. Sylvie Dodin Dewailly, a professor of medicine at Laval University. He died in a rock slide accident on Réunion Island on June 17, 2014.
