= Wei Shoukun =

Chinese metallurgist, physical chemist and materials engineer

Wei Shoukun (Chinese: 魏寿昆; 16 September 1907 – 30 June 2014) was a Chinese metallurgist, physical chemist, and materials engineer. Considered a founder of metallurgical physical chemistry in China, he taught for eight decades at ten different universities. He was a founding professor and Vice President of the University of Science and Technology Beijing, and was elected an academician of the Chinese Academy of Sciences in 1980.

== Early life and education ==
Wei Shoukun was born on 16 September 1907 in Tianjin, China in the final years of the Qing Dynasty. After graduating from the Department of Mining and Metallurgy of Peiyang University (now Tianjin University) in 1929, he was hired by the university as a faculty member. In 1931, he went to Germany to study at Technische Hochschule Dresden. He earned his doctor of engineering degree in chemistry four years later, and conducted research at the Institute of Steel Metallurgy, RWTH Aachen University for another year.

== Career ==
In 1936, Wei returned to China and became a professor at Peiyang University. The Second Sino-Japanese War broke out a year later, and the Japanese army occupied Tianjin. Wei fled the city for Western China, where he taught at several universities during the war, including Northwest Union University and Northwestern Engineering Institute in Shaanxi and Chongqing University in Sichuan.

After the end of the war, Wei returned to Peiyang University in 1946 and was appointed Chair of the Department of Metallurgy. He became Dean of the School of Engineering in 1949, and Vice Provost in 1951. He also served as Dean of Tangshan Jiaotong University.

In 1952, Wei helped establish Beijing Institute of Iron and Steel Technology (now University of Science and Technology Beijing), and served as Provost of the university and Chair of the Department of Smelting. He served as Vice President of the university from 1979 to 1983, and was elected an academician of the Chinese Academy of Sciences in 1980.

Wei joined the Jiusan Society in 1952, and served as a member of the party's 6th Central Committee and a standing committee member of the 7th Central Committee.

Wei died on 30 June 2014 in Beijing, at the age of 106 (107 in East Asian age reckoning). He was the longest-living academician of the Chinese Academy of Sciences.

== Contributions and honours ==
Wei is considered a founder of the physical chemistry of process metallurgy in China. He made major contributions to desulfurization and dephosphorization of steel, selective oxidation, thermodynamics of metallurgy, and other areas. He published five monographs and 140 research papers.

Wei had a distinguished teaching career spanning eight decades, including 46 years of classroom teaching. He taught four or five generations of Chinese metallurgists at ten universities, including about a dozen academicians and hundreds of leading scientists at major corporations and research institutes.

Wei was a recipient of the State Natural Science Award and the Ho Leung Ho Lee Prize for Technological Sciences. In September 2011, the Science Press of China published Biography of Wei Shoukun, authored by Wu Shizhong (吴石忠) and Jiang Xi (姜曦).
