= Mary Ellen Epps =

American politician

Member of the Colorado Senate from the 11th district
- In office January 13, 1999 – January 8, 2003
- Preceded by: Jeff Wells
- Succeeded by: Ed Jones

Member of the Colorado House of Representatives from the 19th district
- In office January 14, 1987 – January 13, 1999
- Preceded by: Peter M. Minahan
- Succeeded by: Richard D. Decker

Personal details
- Born: December 25, 1934 Copperhill, Tennessee
- Died: June 6, 2014 (aged 79) Colorado Springs, Colorado
- Party: Republican

Mary Ellen Epps (December 25, 1934 – June 6, 2014) was an American politician who served in the Colorado House of Representatives from the 19th district from 1987 to 1999 and in the Colorado Senate from the 11th district from 1999 to 2003. She was a Republican.

She died on June 6, 2014, in Colorado Springs, Colorado at age 79.
