= Predhuman K. Joseph Dhar =

Indian author and social worker (died 2014)

P.K. Joseph Dhar
- Born: Predhuman Kumar Joseph Dhar; Srinagar, Jammu and Kashmir
- Died: 12 June 2014; Jammu, Jammu and Kashmir
- Other names: Joseph Dhar
- Occupations: Social worker, writer

Predhuman K. Joseph Dhar popularly known as PK Joseph Dhar, was an author, social worker and a writer.

== Personal life ==
Dhar was born in Srinagar, Kashmir but forced to leave Kashmir and migrate to Jammu in year 1990.

== Notability ==
He translated the Bible into the Kashmiri language, which was released by the Apostolic Nuncio to India. The Kashmiri version includes the Books of the Apocrypha as well; this work is published by the Bible Society of India.

Dhar belonged to a Kashmiri Pandit family but embraced Christianity in 1984. He served as a Chief spokesperson for All Jammu and Kashmir Catholic Sabha and took initiatives for the welfare of minorities in the state.

Dhar was also the convener of the Catholic Christian Forum of Jammu and Kashmir and also principal of Coventry Scholars school in Chinore, Jammu for few years. The DD Kashir has telecast a 28-minute documentary titled Shehil Kul (Shady Tree) about Dhar.

== Death ==
Dhar died on 12 June 2014.
