= Ernest Tursunov =

Kyrgyzstani poet

Ernest Tursunov (Турсунов Эрнис Нурдинович) (24 August 1935 – 11 June 2014) was a Kyrgyzstani poet.

His list of publications includes also translations, controversially, of the Quran from Russian into Kyrgyz, and a Kyrgyz New Testament.
