= Hussein Shire =

Hussein Shire حسين شاير
- Born: 1928 or 1929; Galkaio, Somalia
- Died: 28 June 2014; Johannesburg, South Africa
- Occupation: Entrepreneur
- Title: CEO of the Gateway Bus Company
- Spouse: Mariam Hussein
- Children: 9

Hussein Shire (Somali: Xuseen Shire, Arabic: حسين شاير) was a Somali entrepreneur. He was the owner and CEO of the Gateway Bus Company.

== Personal life ==
Shire was born between 1928 and 1929 in Galkaio, Somalia to ethnic Somali parents. He comes from a middle-class background,[3] and belongs to the Sheekhaal Hawiye clan.[4].

He was married to Mariam Hussein, with whom he had nine children; five boys and four girls.

Shire spent much of his life running his business empire. On 28 June 2014, he died in a hospital in Johannesburg, South Africa after undergoing knee surgery. According to relatives, he had also been battling a number of kidney-related ailments. Shire was 85 years old.

== Career ==
Shire started his career in the transport industry, ferrying passengers in a blue Peugeot 504 car. He also owned a grocery shop, and would sell sodas and ice to travellers. According to his son, Abdullahi Shire, Hussein Shire was among a handful of entrepreneurs to start businesses in the area during the 1950s.

With profits from his shop and the Peugeot business, Shire bought a minibus and a trailer. In the 1980s, he established the Gateway Bus Company, his first large firm.

Serving as its owner and CEO, Gateway grew into one of the largest bus companies in Uganda, with more than 100 buses operating all over the country. Gateway now also operates routes to Kenya and South Sudan.

Besides that firm, Shire also owned a number of other businesses. Among these were Shire Petroleum, real estate, Hussein Stores, a shop located along Tagore Road in Tororo, and a 2,000 acre sugarcane plantation that supplied Kakira Sugar Works and Mayuge Sugar Works.
