= Ernie Eiffler =

Australian rules footballer

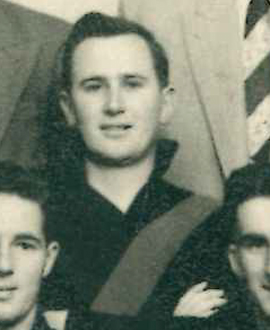
- Eiffler in 1945

Personal information
- Full name: William Ernest Eiffler
- Born: 4 November 1925; Youanmi, Western Australia
- Died: 2 June 2014 (aged 88); Palmyra, Western Australia
- Original team: Subiaco
- Height: 179 cm (5 ft 10 in)
- Weight: 67 kg (148 lb)

Playing career^{1}
Years	Club	Games (Goals)
1945	Collingwood	3 (0)
- ^{1} Playing statistics correct to the end of 1945.

William Ernest Eiffler (4 November 1925 – 2 June 2014) was an Australian rules footballer who played with Collingwood in the Victorian Football League (VFL).
