= Maria Alquilar =

American ceramic artist

- Born: Barbara Pincus; May 28, 1928; New York City
- Died: June 5, 2014 (aged 86); Sacramento, California
- Known for: Ceramics, Painting, Murals

Maria Alquilar (also known as Barbara Taffet, née Pincus; May 28, 1928 - June 5, 2014) was an American ceramic artist. Her work is featured at the Smithsonian American Art Museum, and collections of the Chase Manhattan Bank, the San Francisco Arts Commission, and the Downey Museum. She was the founder of the Jennifer Pauls Gallery in Sacramento.

== Biography ==
Barbara Pincus was born in New York City in 1928. Her father was Spanish and her mother was Russian Jewish. She earned a bachelor of arts in 1955 from Hunter College. Pincus married Frank Taffet in 1949. When Taffet died in 1973, she changed her name to Maria Alquilar. Beginning in the 1980s Alquilar lived in Santa Cruz, California and Miami, Florida.

Alquilar spent her early life working as both a teacher and a social worker. Her gaze shifted to art when in 1970, she and Colette Garrison opened the Jennifer Pauls Gallery in Old Sacramento. Alquilar focused on expressionistic and figurative imagery and showcased artists such as Anne Gregory, Ken Little, Joan Moment and Mary Warner. She later became the sole owner of the gallery, and took it with her when she moved to Lake of the Pines and then Roseville. She eventually returned to Sacramento, installing the Jennifer Pauls Gallery in a shared space with the Himovitz/Solomon Gallery.

In 1986, Alquilar sold the Jennifer Pauls Gallery to focus on her own art. She was well known for using bright, vibrant colors and dreamy imagery. She created over a multitude of mediums. She is most well known for her ceramic murals, many of which can be seen throughout Sacramento.

In 2004, she was commissioned by the city of Livermore, California to create a mural for the city's new public library. When the $40,000 mural was unveiled in October 2004, the names of two books and 11 prominent historical figures, such as Albert Einstein, were misspelled. She initially refused to fix the mural, citing artistic license. However, she quietly returned to correct the misspellings the following summer.
