= John Dalgleish =

Australian rules footballer

Personal information
- Full name: John Dalgleish
- Born: 10 July 1940
- Died: 27 June 2014 (aged 73)
- Original team: Shepparton
- Height: 184 cm (6 ft 0 in)
- Weight: 77 kg (170 lb)

Playing career^{1}
Years	Club	Games (Goals)
1960–61	North Melbourne	9 (1)
- ^{1} Playing statistics correct to the end of 1961.

John Dalgleish (10 July 1940 – 27 June 2014) was an Australian rules footballer who played with North Melbourne in the Victorian Football League (VFL).
