= Leo De Maeyer =

Belgian chemist (1927–2014)

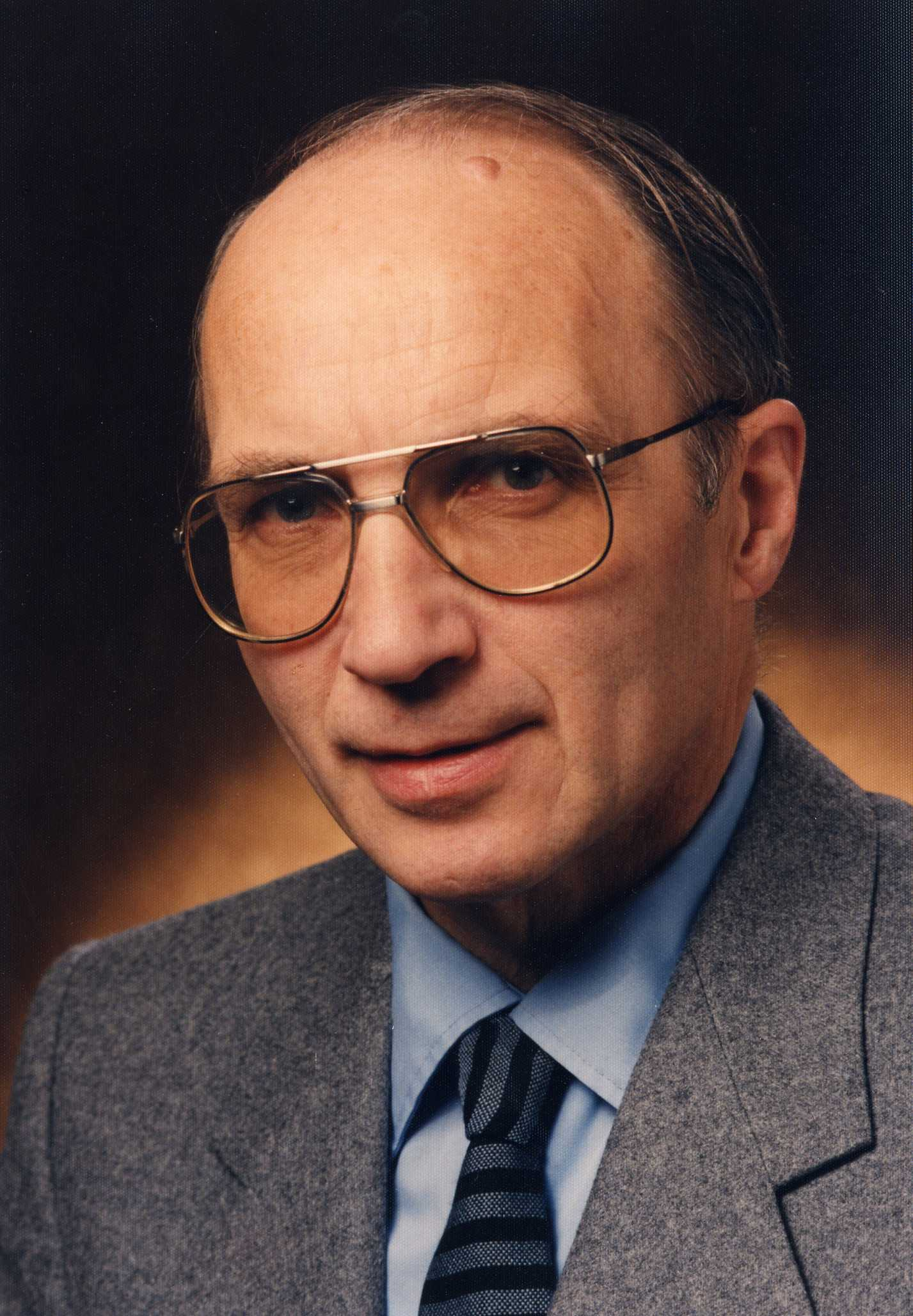
- De Maeyer in 1971
- Born: December 8, 1927; Hombeek, Belgium
- Died: June 18, 2014 (aged 86)
- Education: Katholieke Universiteit Leuven
- Spouse: Clara Burssens

Leo Carl Maria De Maeyer (8 December 1927 – 18 June 2014) was a Belgian physical chemist. He made an important contribution to the development of instrumental methods for the measurement of fast chemical reactions which led to the 1967 Nobel Prize in Chemistry given to Manfred Eigen. De Maeyer did his main scientific work at the Max-Planck-Institute for physical chemistry in Göttingen, Germany.

== Education and early life ==
De Maeyer was born on 8 December 1927 in Hombeek, Belgium. He was the third son of Renée Meuldermanns and Franz De Maeyer, the district administrator in Belgian Congo at the time, after 1930 independent certified public accountant in Mechelen.

Leo De Maeyer received his formal education at the Koninklijk Atheneum of Mechelen (Belgium) and studied chemistry at the Katholieke Universiteit Leuven in Belgium in 1945. From 1952–1954, Leo De Maeyer had to interrupt his studies to do his military service. In the same year he received his PhD in sciences from the university in Leuven, supervised by Joseph-Charles Jungers. De Maeyer then left Belgium with a scholarship to join the Max-Planck-Institute for physical chemistry directed by. K.F. Bonhoeffer in Göttingen, Germany. He became a staff member in 1956.

== Career and historical research ==
As one of the first collaborators of Manfred Eigen, who had been appointed as a department director at the institute in 1953, De Maeyer became deeply involved in a new approach to the study of very fast chemical processes, which was based on the measurement of chemical relaxation phenomena during the return to equilibrium after a physically induced perturbation of a chemical system.

In 1955 Eigen and De Maeyer succeeded in measuring the reaction rate and the mechanism of neutralization reaction H^{+} + OH^{–} = H_{2}O for the first time, supposedly the fastest reaction known. Up until then this was thought to be impossible. These results were presented for the first time in May 1955 in Goslar at the Bunsentagung, the annual meeting of the Deutsche Bunsengesellschaft für Physikalische Chemie and jointly published in 1955.

Among other things they had to construct a new measuring bridge (now Exponat Deutsches Museum Bonn). and produce pure conductivity water which had been produced only once before, 60 years previously in 1894.

The success of this work, and Bonhoeffer's way of establishing a fertile environment for diverse new research disciplines in his institute, led him to remain in Goettingen and become a scientific assistant at the Max-Planck-Institute fuer Physikalische Chemie in 1956.

In 1961/62 De Maeyer was invited to the Massachusetts Institute of Technology (MIT) to lecture about the novel field of fast chemical reactions in solution. The importance of this field for many fast biochemical processes was recognized very soon. Among many other applications, the mechanisms of chemical signaling, information transfer and storage in biological systems, appeared the most interesting. Subsequent to his stay at MIT, De Maeyer was among the first associates of the Neurosciences Research Program, founded in 1962 by F.O. Schmitt in Boston, devoted to understanding neuronal mechanisms of information processing in the brain.

At this time Goettingen was the leading center of fast reaction kinetics and relaxation chemistry. Many new approaches for observation and perturbation as well as techniques or instruments adapted to special applications were first developed here.

In 1963 De Maeyer was visiting lecturer at Cornell University (Ithaca), in 1966, 1969 and 1972 at University of Colorado Boulder.

In 1965 De Maeyer became a Wissenschaftliches Mitglied (Scientific Fellow) of the Max-Planck-Gesellschaft. The department shared with M. Eigen was visited by many scientists and postdocs from all continents. Experimental methods were steadily innovated, new technologies introduced and applications widened to important biochemical and biophysical phenomena.

The Nobelprize Chemistry in 1967 was awarded to Norrish and Porter (each 1/4) and to Manfred Eigen (1/2) "for their studies of extremely fast chemical reactions, effected by disturbing the equilibrium by means of very short pulses of energy." Much of this work was done by Leo De Maeyer and Eigen mentioned him in the Banquetspeech and in the Nobellecture.

A new conception of the role of physical chemistry in biology eventually led to the transformation of the institute into a new multidisciplinary Max-Planck-Institut fuer Biophysikalische Chemie, named Karl-Friedrich-Bonhoeffer-Institut. In 1971 De Maeyer became a member of the Kollegium of this new institute and director of the department "Experimentelle Methoden", where advanced physical techniques for studying dynamic phenomena in liquid media and algorithmic methods for unbiased evaluation of experimental data were developed. Molecular acoustics, photon correlation studies of fluctuation phenomena, non-linear behaviour of matter in strong electric fields, numerical computational methods and other computer applications are among the main research fields of this department.

In the late sixties De Maeyer was solicited from the University of Leuven to participate in establishing a new department of chemistry, needed because of the splitting of the university in independent Flemish and French campuses. As a guest professor and later as a part-time extraordinary professor he founded the Flemish Katholieke Universiteit Leuven's Laboratory for Chemical and Biological Dynamics, an engagement that entitled him to teach physical chemistry and guide doctoral dissertations.

In 1978 the European Molecular Biology Organisation (EMBO) started the operation of the European Molecular Biology Laboratory (EMBL) in Heidelberg. One of the early planned research activities of the laboratory (which was modelled after the European nuclear physics laboratory CERN in Geneva) was the application and development of innovative but sometimes expensive physical instrumentation for molecular biology research. During a three years leave from the Max-Planck-Institute, De Maeyer organized the Division of Instrumentation of EMBL. Applications of synchrotron radiation at EMBL's outstation located at DESY in Hamburg, high resolution scanning cryo-electron-microscopy, development and introduction of confocal microscopy, novel DNA-sequencing methods with fluorescent markers were among the main results achieved in this period.

It was his objective to transfer mature technologies from various other science- and engineering disciplines into the experimental arsenal of molecular biological methods.

== Personal life ==
De Maeyer married Clara Burssens (1931–2015) in 1956, they had four children.

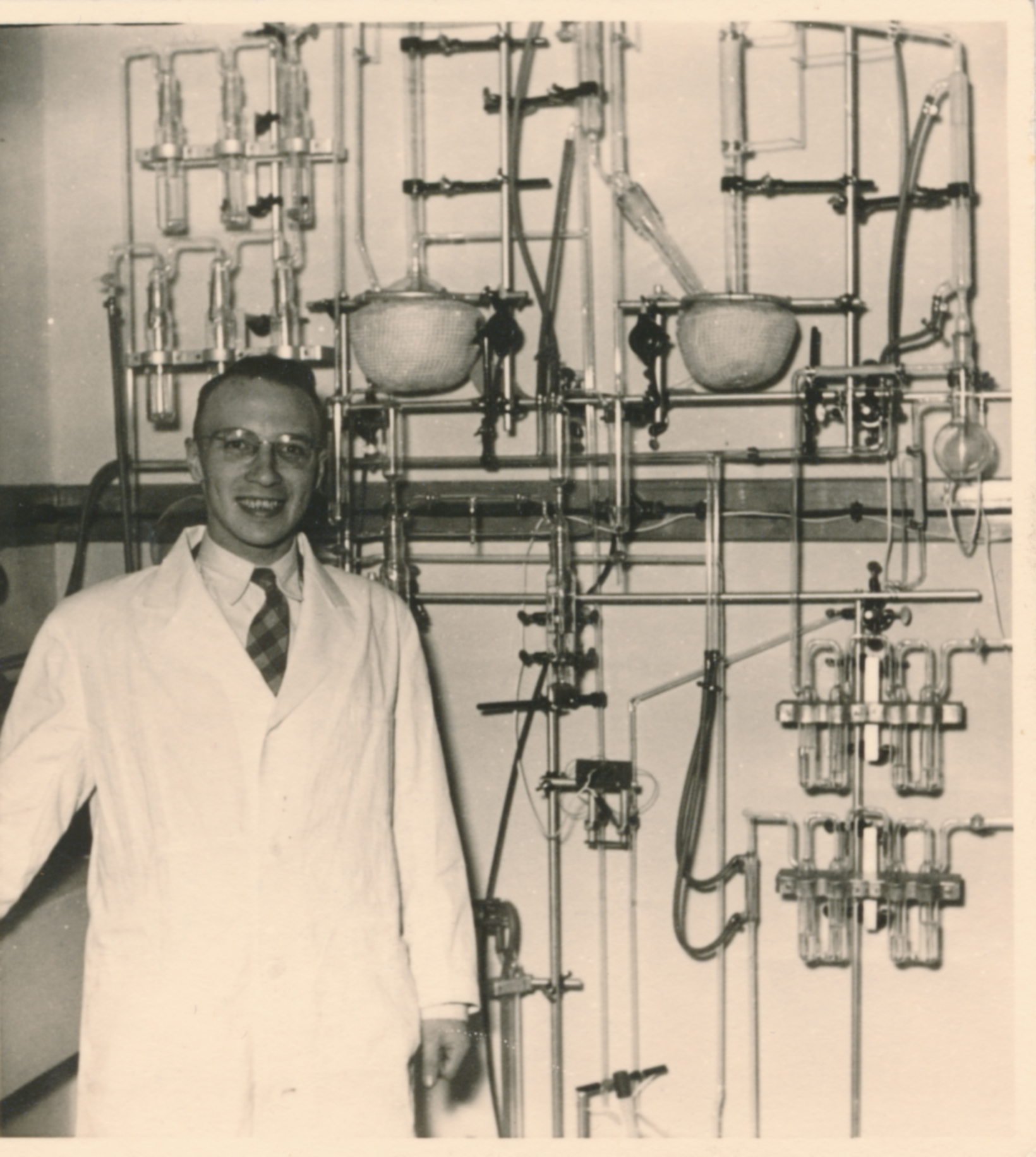
De Maeyer in front of the distillation apparatus, 1955

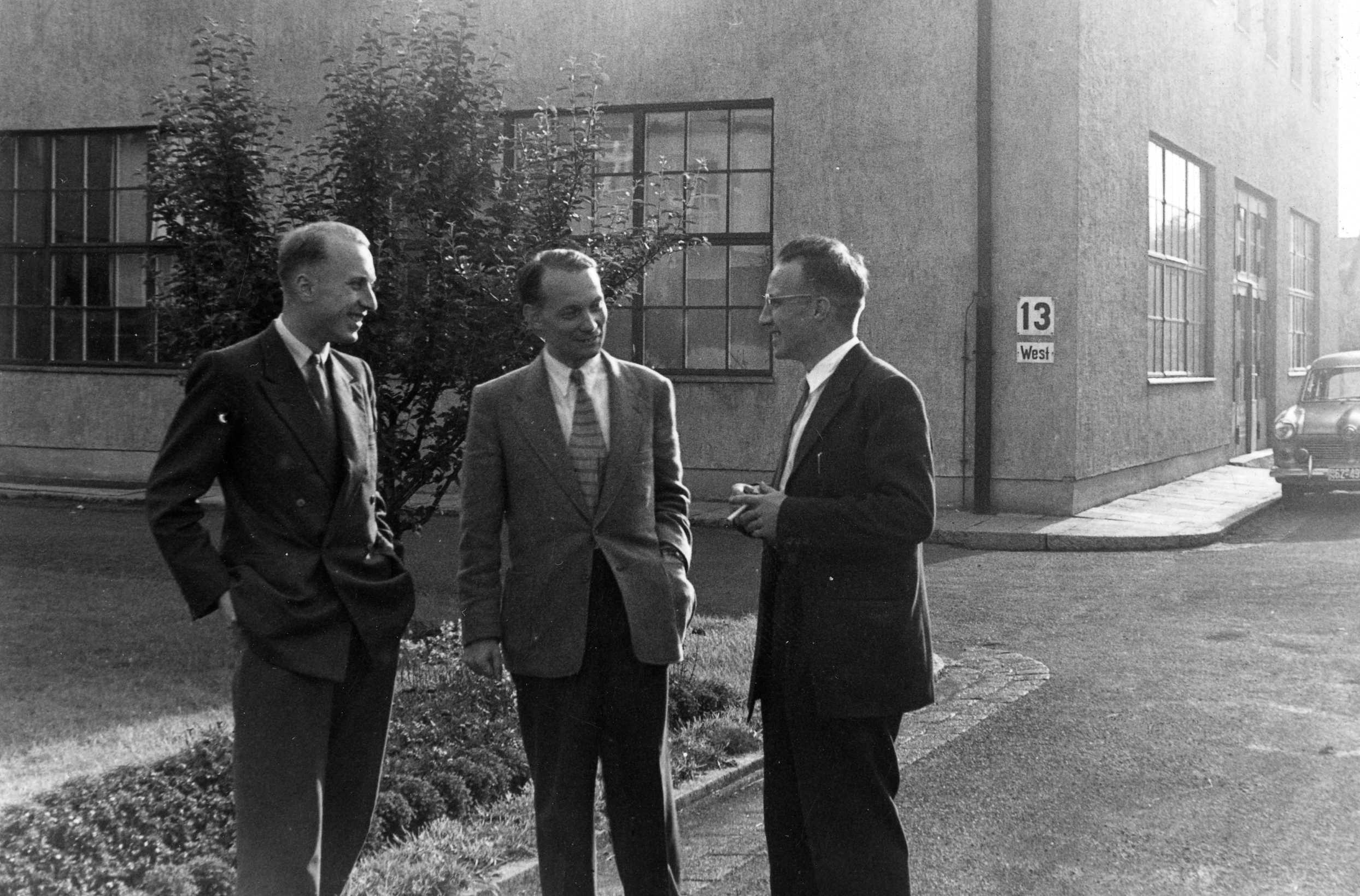
De Maeyer, Eigen and another scientist in front of the Institute in the Bunsenstraße, 1955

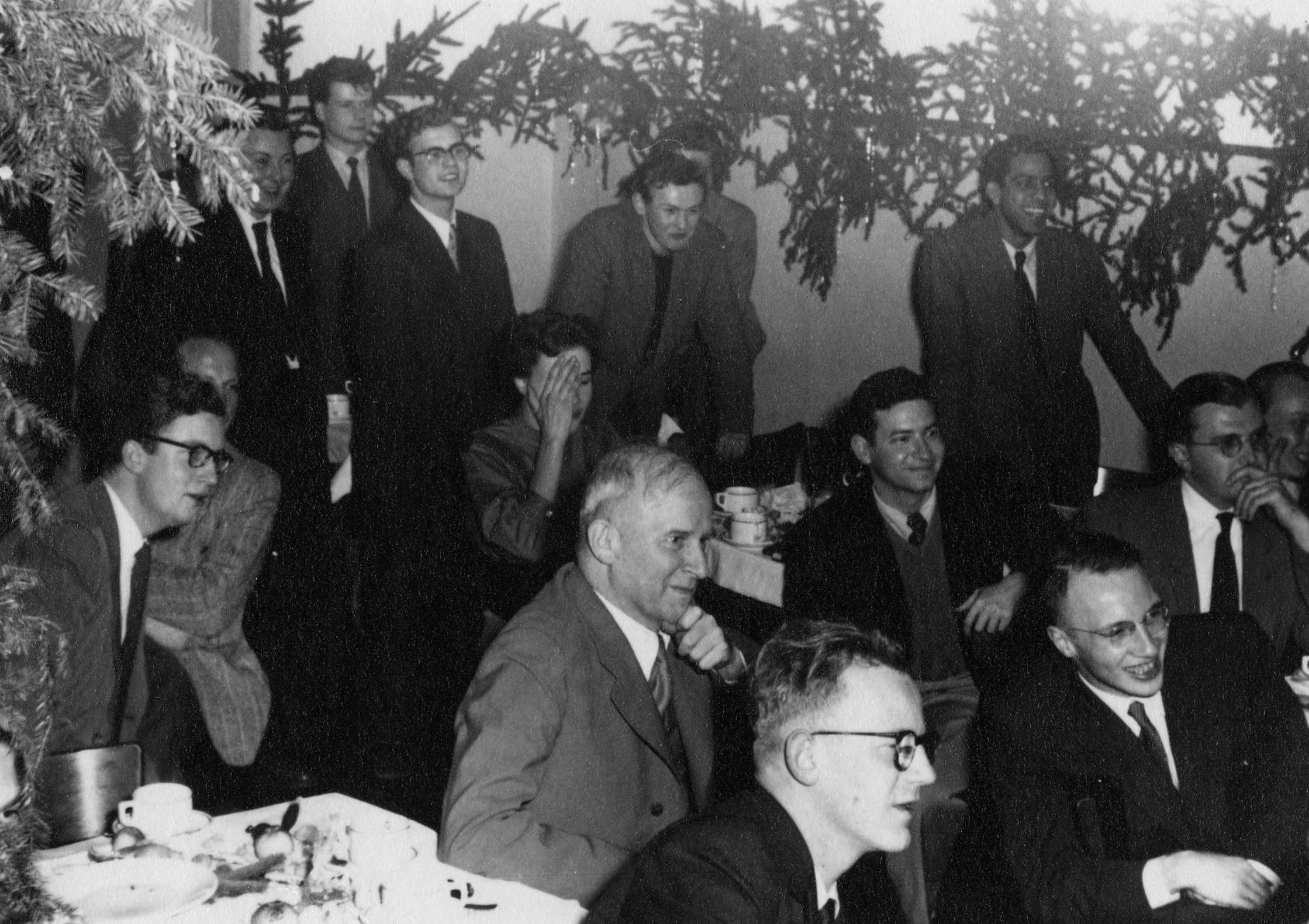
Karl Friedrich Bonhoeffer, Leo De Maeyer and other scientist at a Christmas party of the Department, 1955

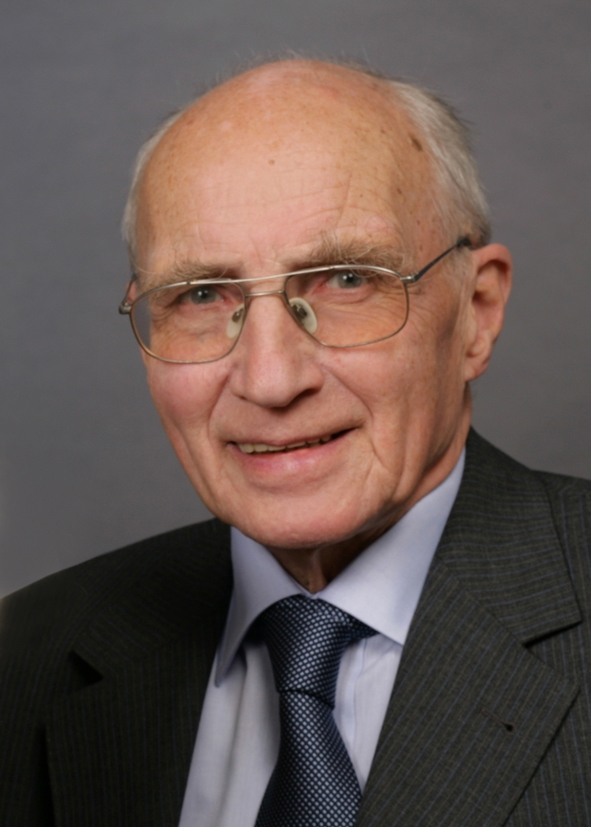
Leo De Maeyer, 2007

== Membership in scientific and technical associations ==
- Bunsengesellschaft fuer Physikalische Chemie (1955)
- Neuroscience research Program NRP (1962)
- Wissenschaftliches Mitglied (Scientific Fellow) der Max-Planck-Gesellschaft (1965)
- Institute of Electrical and Electronics Engineers (IEEE) Life Member (1964)
- Koninklijke Vlaamse Chemische Vereniging, (1947, honorary member from 1969)
- National Academy of Engineering, USA, elected foreign associate (1998)
- American Optical Society (1964–1984)
- International Union of Pure and Applied Biophysics (IUPAB), Council Member (1981–1990)
- Associate editor of JBBM (Journal of Biochemical and Biological Methods), (1981)
- Committee on Data for Science and Technology (CODATA), Interdisciplinary Body of the International Council of Scientific Unions, member (1981–1996)
- Lid van de Commissie van Fysische Scheikunde (Belgian Foundation of Scientific Research (FNRS-NFWO)), (1972–1990)

== Important publications ==
- with M. Eigen: Relaxation Methods in Technique of Organic Chemistry, Vol. 8, Part II. Ed. By Arnold Weissberger, Interscience Publ. (1963)
- Electric fields in Methods in Enzymology, Vol XVI: Fast Reactions, p. 80, Academic Press, New York, (1969)
- with M. Eigen: Theoretical basis of relaxation spectrometry in: Techniques of Chemistry, Vol. 6, Part 2, Chapter III, J. Wiley & Sons Inc., New York (1973)
- with K. Gnädig, J. Hendrix en B. Saleh: Photon correlation spectroscopy of molecular processes in solution, Quart. Rev. Biophysics 9, 83 (1976)
- Chemical relaxation methods in organic chemistry, Bulletin de la Socit Chimique de France, No. 2, 243–252 (1988)
- with K. Clays, A. Persoons: Hyper-Raleigh scattering in solution in: Modern Nonlinear Optics, Part 3, Eds. M. Evans and St. Kielich. Advances in Chemical Physics Series, Vol. LXXXV, John Wiley & Sons, Inc., ISBN 0-471-30499-9, 455–498 (1994)

== Literature ==
- Artikel J.J. Jennen: „Over Dr. Leo C.M. de Maeyer en diens bijdrage tot de jongste Nobelprijs Chemie“, Het Ingenieursblad 37e jaargang 1968, nr. 13–14 513–531
- Martin Hinoul, Geniale geesten: 110 jaar Nobelprijzen, 2011, Leuven University Press, blz. 176 Google Books
- Nationaal Biografisch Woordenboek: lemma Leo Carl Maria De Maeyer door Hendrik Deelstra, vol. 23, 2018, col. 777–785, Belgien
