= Republic Express Airlines =

Indonesian cargo airline

IATA	ICAO	Call sign
RH	RPH	PUBLIC EXPRESS
- Founded: 2001; 25 years ago
- Ceased operations: 2010; 16 years ago
- Focus cities: Bandung; Surabaya; Medan; Makassar
- Frequent-flyer program: RPXme
- Fleet size: Defunct
- Parent company: RPX Group Media Group
- Headquarters: Jakarta, Indonesia
- Key people: Surya Paloh
- Website: https://rpx.co.id/

Republic Express Airlines (RPX Airlines) was a cargo airline based in Jakarta, Indonesia. It operates domestic and regional cargo services. Republic Express Airlines is listed in category 2 by Indonesian Civil Aviation Authority for airline safety quality.

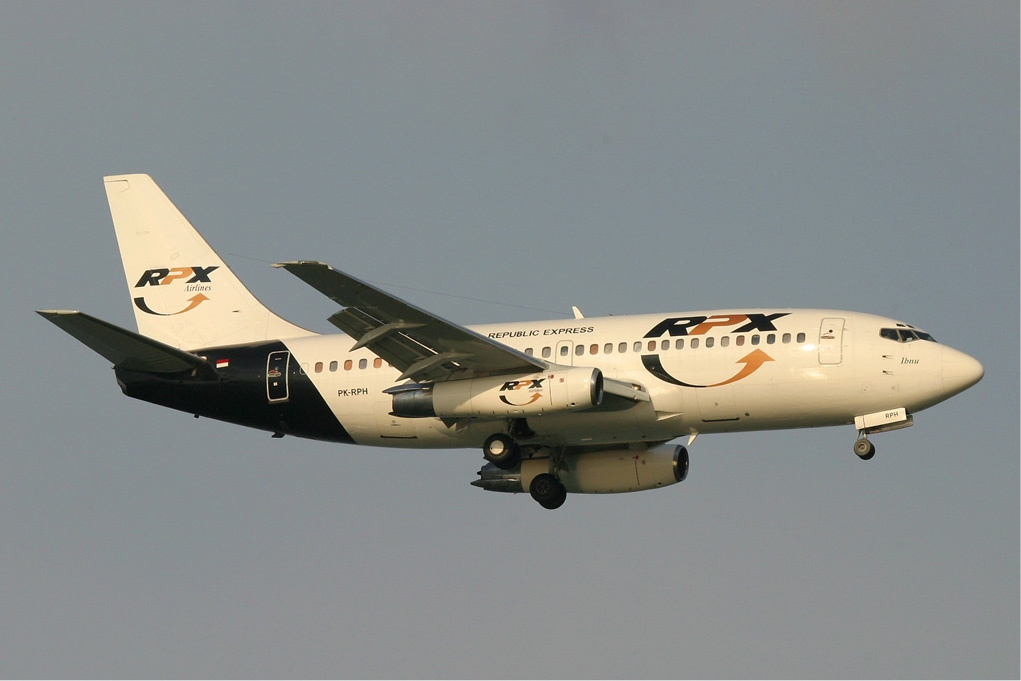
A Republic Express Boeing 737-200.

== History ==
The airline was established in 2001 and started operations on 17 October 2001. It was wholly owned by the RPX Group. Since 1985 RPX has been the licensee in Indonesia for Federal Express.

The airline ceased operations in 2010 and its only remaining aircraft was stored in Jayapura until 2015.

== Destinations ==
The airline's destinations included Batam, Jakarta, Kuala Lumpur, Surabaya, Balikpapan, Makassar, Pekanbaru and Surakarta.

== Fleet ==
In 2006, the Republic Express Airlines fleet included:

Republic Express Airlines fleet
Aircraft	In fleet	Notes
Boeing 737-200C	3	Cargo
Total	3	
