= Plácido Bilbao =

Spanish footballer

Personal information
- Full name: Plácido Bilbao Zubiaur
- Date of birth: 13 September 1940
- Place of birth: Lamiaco, Spain
- Date of death: 16 June 2014 (aged 73)
- Position: Striker

Senior career*
Years	Team	Apps	(Gls)
1961–1962	Indautxu	13	(2)
1962–1964	Athletic Bilbao	11	(1)
1964–1965	Real Valladolid	30	(5)
1965–1967	Recreativo de Huelva	53	(6)
1967–1968	Arenas Club		
1968–1969	Boston Beacons		
1969–1970	Estepona		
1970–1972	Melilla		
Total		107	(14)
- * Club domestic league appearances and goals

Plácido Bilbao Zubiaur (13 September 1940 – 16 June 2014) was a Spanish professional footballer who played as a striker.

== Career ==
Born in Lamiaco, Bilbao played for Indautxu, Athletic Bilbao, Real Valladolid, Recreativo de Huelva, Arenas Club, the Boston Beacons, Estepona and Melilla.
