= Roger Ackling =

British sculptor (1947–2014)

- Born: 11 August 1947; Isleworth, London, England
- Died: 5 June 2014 (aged 66)
- Known for: Sculpture
- Website: Roger Ackling – Art UK

Walter Roger Ackling (11 August 1947–5 June 2014) was a British sculptor.

His work is found in several collections including the Tate Modern in London, British Council Collection and Tokyo Metropolitan Museum, Tokyo, Japan.

Ackling died of motor neurone disease on 5 June 2014.

== Bibliography ==
- Kalkhoven, Emma. Roger Ackling: Between the Lines. London: Occasional Papers, 2015 ISBN 9780992903961
