= Maria Perosino =

Italian author and art historian (1961–2014)

Maria Perosino (10 December 1961 – 16 June 2014) was an Italian author and art historian.

Born in Turin, Perosino graduated in art history at the University of Turin. She was curator of several exhibitions and cultural events, and responsible for the implementation of the many exhibition catalogues. Her 2012 book, Io viaggio sola (I Travel Alone), a semi-serious spiritual and practical guide for women who want to travel alone, got a critical and commercial success and in 2013 it was adapted into a film, A Five Star Life, directed by Maria Sole Tognazzi. She died of tumor the day before the release of her last novel, Le scelte che non hai fatto.

== Selected publications ==
- Maria Perosino, Renoir, Electa, 1992, ISBN 88-435-4095-5.
- Maria Perosino, Toulouse-Lautrec, Electa, 1997, ISBN 978-8843540969.
- Paolo Fossati and Maria Perosino, Renata Boero, Essegi, 1997, ISBN 88-7189-232-1.
- Maria Perosino, Silvana Sermisoni and Sandra Solimano (cured by), Acqua, aria, terra, fuoco: i quattro elementi: l'energia della natura tra arte e scienza, Skira, 2005, ISBN 88-7624-567-7.
- Maria Perosino (cured by), Effetto terra, Johan & Levi, 2010, ISBN 978-88-6010-051-1.
- Maria Perosino (cured by), Abc e altri giochi di Bruno Munari, Felici, 2010, ISBN 978-88-6019-414-5.
- Lorenzo Mattotti and Maria Perosino (cured by), La fabbrica di Pinocchio, Nuages, 2010, ISBN 978-88-96563-25-0.
- Maria Perosino, Io viaggio da sola, Einaudi, 2012, ISBN 9788806212834.
- Maria Perosino, Le scelte che non hai fatto, Einaudi, 2014, ISBN 9788806216191.
