= Matin Ahmed Khan =

Pakistani academic, marketing expert and management educator

- Died: 22 June 2014
- Education: DBA
- Alma mater: University of Southern California
- Occupation: Professor
- Known for: Dean and Director, Institute of Business Administration, Karachi, 1972–77
- Notable work: Research methodology for business and social problems. University Grants Commission, 1989
- Awards: Sitara-e-Imtiaz

Matin Ahmed Khan was a Pakistani academic, marketing expert and management educator.

He served as Dean and Director of the Institute of Business Administration from 1972 to 1977 and contributed greatly to the development of academic standards throughout the country.

== Career ==
He began his education from the Aligarh Muslim University in the early 1940s. He became the first Muslim PhD in business administration. He received his MA from the Wharton School of the University of Pennsylvania and DBA from the University of Southern California. His areas of research and teaching include marketing, market research and consumer behaviour. He was associated as Project Director for almost a decade with JRP-IV, a research project on slum improvement. He was a visiting professor at Ahmadu Bello University, Nigeria. Khan authored a large number of books and articles on marketing and research methodology including:

- Research methodology for business and social problems. University Grants Commission, 1989.
- Wholesale trade in Karachi. Institute of Public and Business Administration, University of Karachi, 1959.

He also published widely in business journals and the media. After his retirement from IBA in the early 1990s, he helped Hakeem Muhammad Saeed establish the Hamdard University of management sciences and became Life Research Professor and Dean, Faculty of Management Sciences, Hamdard Institute of Management Sciences, Karachi. In 2007 President Pervez Musharraf conferred civil awards on 154 citizens of Pakistan for excellence in various fields. Dr Matin Ahmed Khan was awarded the Sitara-e-Imtiaz for his service in the field of education.

After two weeks of illness he died on 22 June 2014 aged 93 years old. He was survived by his spouse, 4 sons, 8 grandsons and 3 granddaughters.
