= Juan Hita =

Spanish footballer

Personal information
- Full name: Juan López Hita
- Date of birth: 5 September 1944
- Place of birth: Algeciras, Spain
- Date of death: 11 June 2014 (aged 69)
- Place of death: Algeciras, Spain
- Height: 1.82 m (5 ft 11 1/2 in)
- Position: Defender

Senior career*
Years	Team	Apps	(Gls)
1963–67	Algeciras	58	(0)
1967–78	Sevilla	260	(2)
1978–79	Algeciras	18	(3)
Total		336	(5)

International career^{‡}
1970–1972	Spain	3	(0)
- * Club domestic league appearances and goals as of 12 June 2014 ‡ National team caps and goals as of 12 June 2014

Juan López Hita (5 September 1944 – 11 June 2014) was a Spanish professional footballer who played most of his career in Sevilla FC. He also appeared in three matches of the national team.
