= Alejandro Antonio Buccolini =

Alejandro Antonio Buccolini (Jan 18, 1930 – June 6, 2014) was a Roman Catholic bishop.

Ordained to the priesthood in 1957, Buccolini was appointed bishop of the Roman Catholic Diocese of Rio Gallegos, Argentina, in 1992 and retired in 2005.
