= John Bartlett (cricketer) =

English cricketer

John Norton Bartlett (26 June 1928 – 8 June 2014) was an English cricketer, born in Mickleover, Derbyshire, who played for Oxford University and Sussex between 1946 and 1953. He appeared in 49 first-class matches as a righthanded batsman who bowled left-arm orthodox spin. He scored 351 runs with a highest score of 28 and took 107 wickets with a best performance of five for 77. His death was announced in June 2014.
