= Kitty Baker =

American mathematics educator, artist and weaver, and author (1912–2014)

Kitty Baker (born Sallie Kathryn Cardwell, August 21, 1912 – June 2, 2014) was an American mathematics educator, artist and weaver, and author of books on theater.

== Early life and education ==
Sallie Kathryn Cardwell was born on August 21, 1912, in Lynchburg, Virginia. Her early interests included both mathematics and art; she won an art contest as a high school student at E. C. Glass High School in Lynchburg, and went to Randolph-Macon Woman's College because of its reputation for strength in both mathematics and art. She graduated in 1934, cum laude, specializing in her studies in mathematics and German.

She was accepted to graduate study at Columbia University, Syracuse University, and the University of Chicago, choosing Chicago because of its proximity to the Art Institute of Chicago. She completed a master's degree at the University of Chicago in 1935.

== Career and later life ==
Cardwell became an instructor at Baylor University, and in 1936 met and married theater professor Paul Baker; they had three children. At Baylor, she became a co-founder of the Baylor Children's theater. In 1963, after a production by her husband of Long Day's Journey into Night was censored by the university administration, they left Baylor with many of the other Baylor theater faculty, moving to Gonzales, Texas, near San Antonio. There, Kitty Baker taught mathematics at Trinity University and San Antonio College.

While at Baylor and Trinity, Baker studied art, naming "Edmund Kinzinger, Austin Killian, Bruce Dean, Gay Wilson Turner and Reynould Arnould" from her time at Baylor and "Robert Tiemann and Jim Stoker" from Trinity as influences. She retired in 1976, and began working more heavily in weaving, working with Hagar Celmins and Margaret Demster, and teaching art at a local high school. She also founded a children's activity center in Gonzales.

She died on June 2, 2014, at her home, of congestive heart failure. One of her daughters, Robyn Flatt, founded the Dallas Children's Theater and became its executive artistic director; a granddaughter, Kristi Cardwell, became a school theater teacher.

== Books ==
With Jearnine Wagner, Baker coauthored A Place for Ideas: Our Theater (Principia Press of Trinity University, 1965). With her husband, she coedited Making Sense With the Five Senses.
