= Ruy Barbosa Popolizio =

Chilean politician

Ruy Barbosa
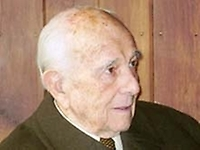

Head of the University of Chile
- In office 1968–1969
- Preceded by: Eugenio González Rojas
- Succeeded by: Edgardo Boeninger

Minister of Lands and Colonization
- In office 17 December 1963 – 6 May 1964
- President: Jorge Alessandri
- Preceded by: Federico Peña Cereceda
- Succeeded by: Paulino Varas

Minister of Agriculture
- In office 26 September 1963 – 3 November 1964
- President: Gabriel González Videla
- Preceded by: Pedro Enrique Alfonso
- Succeeded by: Hugo Trivelli

Personal details
- Born: 2 December 1919 Santiago, Chile
- Died: 8 June 2014 (aged 94) Santiago, Chile
- Spouse: Elena Gellona
- Children: Three
- Education: University of Chile; University of Turin (Ph.D)
- Profession: Agricultural engineer

Ruy Barbosa Popolizio (December 2, 1919 – June 8, 2014) was a Chilean businessman, politician, and oenologist.

Barbosa served as the Minister of Agriculture from September 26, 1963, until November 3, 1964, as well as the Minister of National Assets briefly from September to November 1963. He later became the dean of the University of Chile from 1968 until 1969.

== Death ==
Barbosa Popolizio died in Santiago, Chile, on June 8, 2014, at the age of 94.
