= Jeffrey Ressner =

American journalist

Jeffrey Ressner (1958–2014) was an American entertainment journalist, most notably for Time, where he served as main correspondent for 24 years (1993–2007).

== Life and career ==
Ressner was born in New Jersey in 1958. He was raised in the town of Lakewood, and graduated in 1975. He was a co-founder of an underground publication at his high school. He graduated from Northwestern University in 1979. He relocated to Los Angeles and began his career as a messenger for The Hollywood Reporter, by covering music in the media, during the mid-1980s. A breakthrough in his career began in 1988, when he became senior writer for Rolling Stone magazine. He became West Coast bureau chief for Us Weekly in the late 1980s. He joined Time magazine in 1993 and remained there until his retirement in 2007.

== Death ==
Ressner died in Santa Monica, California, on June 26, 2014, at age 56, of heart arrhythmia.
