= Lois Geary =

American actress

Lois Geary (July 25, 1929 – June 28, 2014) was an American actress of the stage and screen.

Geary was born in Fort Wayne, Indiana and moved to Santa Fe, New Mexico in the 1960s. She often worked in the area's scene, but would land small roles in films like The Astronaut Farmer, Silverado, Sunshine Cleaning and The Last Stand.

Geary died on June 28, 2014, at the age of 84.

== Filmography ==
Year	Title	Role	Notes
1985	Silverado	Mrs. Parker	
1997	Santa Fe	Mrs. Cowling	
2001	Maniacts	Old Woman #1	
2006	The Astronaut Farmer	Mrs. Graham	
2008	Sunshine Cleaning	Mrs. Davis	
2013	The Last Stand	Mrs. Salazar	(final film role)
