= American Daffodil Society =

The American Daffodil Society (ADS), founded in 1954, in the centre for information on daffodils in the United States, and is dedicated to encouraging interest in and the breeding of daffodils. The ADS works closely with other daffodil societies around the world including the original Daffodil Society (1898) in the United Kingdom and the Royal Horticultural Society. The latter organization is the international centre for the registration of daffodil cultivars.

The society publishes a quarterly journal, The Daffodil Journal, and has membership in 48 States and many countries around the world. The ADS maintains online resources on daffodils such as its DaffLibrary that contains many historical articles about daffodils.
