= Haobam Ongbi Ngangbi Devi =

Indian dancer and musician (1924–2014)

- Born: 1 August 1924; Uripok Bachaspati Leikai, Imphal, Manipur, India
- Died: 12 June 2014 (aged 89); Imphal
- Occupations: Classical dancer, musician
- Spouse: Haobam Amuba Singh
- Parent: Koijam Bokul Singh
- Awards: Padma Shri; Government of Assam Birangana; Government of Manipur Gold Medal; Manipur State Kala Akademi Award; Nirtya Bhushan Award; Sangeet Natak Akademi Award

Haobam Ongbi Ngangbi Devi (1 August 1924 – 12 June 2014) was an Indian classical dancer and musician, known for her expertise in the Manipuri Dance forms of Lai Haraoba and Raas. In 2010, the Government of India awarded Haobam Ongbi Ngangbi Devi the Padma Shri, the fourth highest Indian civilian award.

== Biography ==
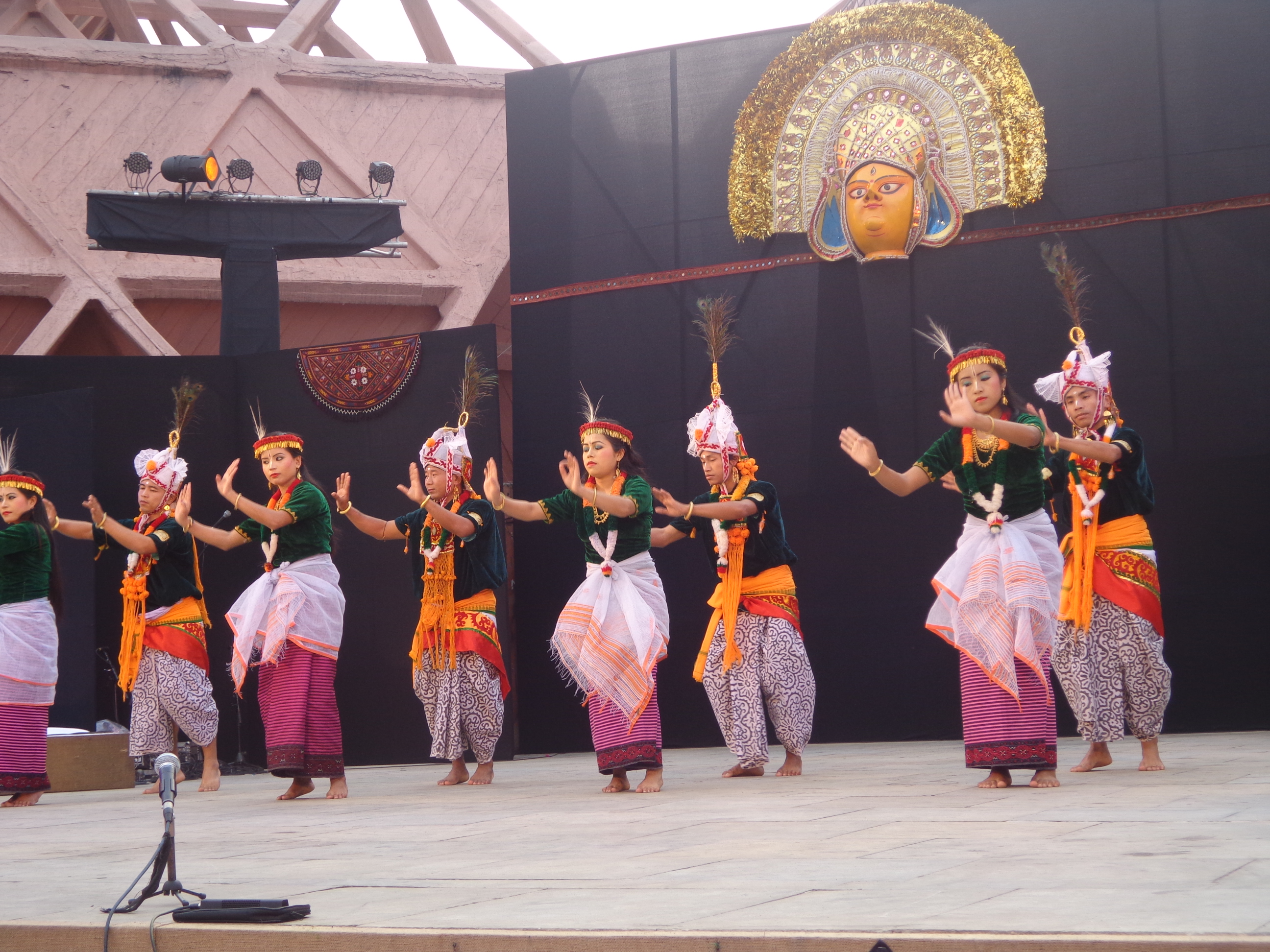
Lai haraoba

Haobam Ongbi Ngangbi Devi was born on 1 August 1924 at Uripok Bachaspati Leikai, Imphal in the Indian state of Manipur to Kijam Bokul Singh who was a locally known Sankirtan Pala performer. She started learning Manipuri dance and music from the age of five from Manipuri Sangeertan Sangh and debuted as an artiste at Jaipaiguri Festival, in Kolkata in 1930. She, later, studied Lai Haraoba, Raas and the ethnic dance forms of the hills under the tutelage of renowned teachers such as Guru Atomba Singh, Yumnam Ojah Natum Singh, Guru M. Amubi Singh, and Ngangom Ojah Jugindro Singh during the period from 1932 till 1940. She also learnt classical music from Ustad Meisnam Bidhu Singh and Chingakham Radhacharan Singh.

Ngangbi Devi, recognized as one of the first classical singers from Manipur, started recording for the All India Radio and also sang playback for Mainu Pemcha, the first feature film attempted by Manipuri, in 1948. When the Jawaharlal Nehru Manipur Dance Academy was established, Ngangbi Devi was appointed as a faculty member in the departments of dance and music. The Academy, an institution of moderate proportions in the beginning, grew over the years during Devi's tenure as a teacher of Lai Haraoba there. She is reported to have researched on Lai Haraoba and is credited with preparing a syllabus for the institution. She also updated herself by continuing her studies at Lalit Kala Bhavan and worked as an actress for the Manipur Dramatic Union, Rupmahal Theatre and Aryan Theatre between 1936 to 1945.

Devi continued her work at the JNM Dance Academy where she rose in ranks to become the Head of the Department of Folk and Community Dance in 1966 and held the post of the vice principal of the Academy at the time of her retirement in 1985. Devi, during her active years, participated in various national and international occasions and festivals such as the Republic Day Folk Dance Festival, National Dance Festival and Inter State Cultural Exchange Programs.

Ngambi Devi married Haobam Amuba Singh in 1941 and the couple had one son. She died on 11 June 2014 at her residence Uripok Tourangbam Leikai, Imphal.

== Awards and recognitions ==
Ngangbi Devi, a recipient of Birangana title from the Government of Assam and a Gold Medal from the Government of Manipur, was awarded the Manipur State Kala Akademi Award in 1980. Two years later, in 1985, Manipuri Sahitya Parishad honored her with the Nirtya Bhushan Award. In 1993, she received the Sangeet Natak Akademi Award. The Government of India included her, in 2010, in the Republic Day honours list for the civilian award of Padma Shri.

== See also ==
- Manipuri dance
- Lai Haraoba
