= Roman Laskowski =

Polish slavist (1936–2014)

- Born: 16 February 1936; Komarno
- Died: 21 June 2014 (aged 78)
- Citizenship: Polish

Roman Laskowski (16 February 1936 – 21 June 2014) was a Polish slavist. He was a member of the Polish Academy of Learning, as well as a professor at Jagiellonian University and the University of Gothenburg. Laskowski was also a Solidarity member.

He is one of the most well known Slavic scholars from Poland, and specialized in Polish, Czech, and Linguistic studies.

== Biography ==
Laskowski was born on 17 February 1936 in Komarno, Ukraine. In 1940, his family was taken to Kazakhstan and went back to Poland in 1946. Roman studied at the high school in Kietrz. He graduated in slavistics from the Jagiellonian University in 1959. He has worked at the university since 1960, and in 1981, he received the title of academic professor. In 2001 he received the title of full professor. From 1973 to 1985 he was a lecturer at the University of Silesia in Katowice.

In 1985 he emigrated to Sweden and settled down in Gothenburg. He decided to go back to Poland in 2001. He worked again as a lecturer at the Jagiellonian University (2001–2007) and University of Social Sciences and Humanities (2008–2012).

In 1995 he was decorated with Knight's Cross of Polonia Restituta for dissemination of Polish culture in Sweden.

He died in 2014 and was buried at the Rakowicki Cemetery.
