= Allan Maas =

Australian rules footballer

Personal information
- Full name: Allan Roy Lindsay Maas
- Born: 13 July 1922; Mildura, Victoria
- Died: 18 June 2014 (aged 91)
- Original team: Red Cliffs
- Height: 180 cm (5 ft 11 in)
- Weight: 83 kg (183 lb)

Playing career^{1}
Years	Club	Games (Goals)
1946–1948	North Melbourne	15 (1)
- ^{1} Playing statistics correct to the end of 1948.

Allan Roy Lindsay Maas (13 July 1922 – 18 June 2014) was an Australian rules footballer who played for the North Melbourne Football Club in the Victorian Football League (VFL).

Prior to his football career, Allan Maas served with distinction in World War II. He enlisted in May 1940 and after completing training was sent to the Middle East as part of the 2/2 Australian Pioneer Battalion. He broke his right leg in the Battle of Merdjayoun in Lebanon in 1941. Maas returned to Melbourne for rehabilitation in 1942, where he met and subsequently married Mildred Ada Rose Brown, an Army dental nurse, in 1943. He was then sent to fight in New Guinea in January 1944 before returning to Australia later that year.

Allan Maas was subsequently an active member of the Returned Services League (RSL), being elected as a State Councillor from District Board 11 in 1978 where he served until 2003. He also served as Chairman of the District Board during that time. He was awarded a Life Membership of the RSL in March 1971 and then Life Membership with Gold Badge in 1999 for his dedicated service. He was also a Meritorious Service Medal recipient in 1995.
