= Peter J. Notaro =

American jurist

Peter J. Notaro (February 21, 1935 – June 17, 2014) was an American jurist.

Born in Buffalo, New York, Notaro received his bachelor's degree from University at Buffalo, The State University of New York, and his law degree from University at Buffalo Law School. He practiced law and then was an assistant district attorney for Erie County, New York. In 1975, Notaro was elected to the Erie County Family Court, and in 1992 to the New York Supreme Court. He retired in 2005. He died in Buffalo.
