= S. M. Shah =

American mathematician

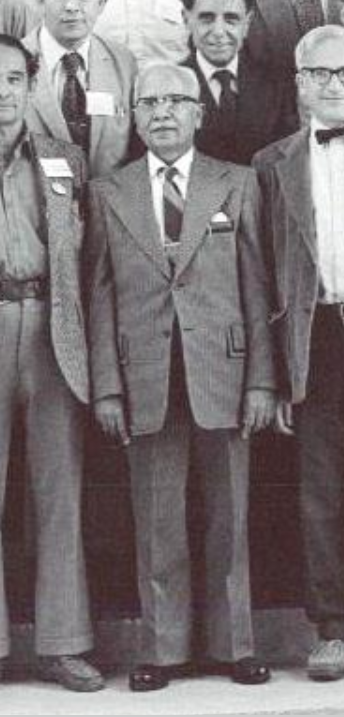
S. M. Shah at retirement, U of Ky, Lexington, KY, May, 1976

Swarupchand Mohanlal Shah (30 December 1905 – 21 April 1996) was a Distinguished Professor of Mathematics at the University of Kentucky. He received his Ph.D. from University of London in 1942, advised by Edward Titchmarsh who was a Ph.D. student of G. H. Hardy. He was a fellow of the Royal Society of Edinburgh.

== Selected publications ==
- "Advanced differential equations with piecewise constant argument deviations", SM Shah, J Wiener, International Journal of Mathematics and Mathematical ..., 1983, hindawi.com
- "Univalent functions with univalent derivatives", SM Shah, SY Trimble, Bulletin of the American Mathematical Society, 1969, ams.org
- "Trigonometric series with quasi-monotone coefficients", SM Shah, Proceedings of the American Mathematical Society, 1962, jstor.org
