= Jay O. Glerum =

American author and consultant

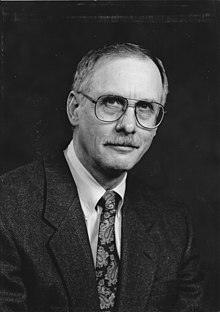
- Born: August 16, 1939 (age 87); Washington D.C., United States
- Died: June 26, 2014 (aged 74); Seattle, Washington
- Occupations: Educator, writer

Jay O. Glerum (August 16, 1939 - June 26, 2014) was an American theatre consultant and author, best known for his book, Stage Rigging Handbook, Jay O. Glerum was widely recognized in the technical theatre circles as the author of the Stage Rigging Handbook, referred to by many stagehands as the bible of the industry. Published by Southern Illinois University Press and continually in print since 1987, the book has been revised each decade to stay current with the rapidly changing field of technical theatre.

As president and founder of Jay O. Glerum & Associates, Inc., Glerum was an independent consultant to a wide band of entertainment venues in the United States, Canada, Europe, and Asia—from amusement parks and performance halls to historic theaters and arenas. He worked with architects and engineers on renovations and new theater buildings and inspected rigging-systems for hundreds of venues. Alone or working with other rigging specialists he taught safe rigging master classes to thousands—both academics and professional stagehands—in Europe, Asia, and North America.

Glerum's work as an educator and advocate of standardized techniques for stage rigging led him to be considered at the forefront of improved safety for theatrical riggers and stagehands. His passionate dedication to backstage safety was influential in the establishment of the current formalized safety standards for stage rigging.

== Early life ==
Born Jay Otis Glerum, Jr., on August 16, 1939, in Washington D.C., he lived with his parents, Catherine and Jay Otis Glerum, Sr., in Evanston, Illinois and Marinette, Wisconsin for the first nine years of his life. The family then moved to the Washington D.C. area, where he graduated from Wheaton High School (Maryland) in 1957. In high school, Glerum became a student of technical theatre and was hired upon graduation as a theatre technician for the summer season at Olney Theatre in Olney, Maryland. He subsequently was hired as the lighting and sound guy for the Catholic University National Players 1957-58 Tour. As the youngest person ever hired at that time by what then was known simply as “The Players,” Glerum toured Germany, Austria, and Italy, entertaining U.S. military troops with Romeo and Juliet and The Taming of the Shrew. That same season, he also toured thirty-six U.S. states with them. Not only did Glerum set up sound and lights for each venue, he drove the truck hauling scenery, props, and costumes and also played small parts in both plays.

After completing two years in pre-engineering at Montgomery Junior College in 1960, he worked as a U.S. postal carrier while also serving as the technical director at Marjorie Webster Junior College in (1960–61) and Dunbarton College of the Holy Cross (1959-61), both in Washington D.C. He then transferred to the University of Washington in 1961 where he earned his B.A. (1963) and M.A. (1965) from the School of Drama.

== Personal ==
He met his future wife, Sara “Sallie” Johnsone, at the University of Washington. They married in September 1962 in Seattle, Washington. Together they raised four children. The family moved to Wauwatosa, Wisconsin, where they lived from 1972 until 1986, at which time Glerum and his wife returned to the Seattle area where they lived until his death in 2014.

== Professional ==
Glerum was hired as an assistant professor in Seattle University's Drama Department in the School of Arts and Sciences in 1965 after serving as its part-time stage carpenter and designer for two years, during which he worked full-time at the USPS. As the sole earner for his growing family, he moonlighted during the mid-1960s and early 1970s with the International Alliance of Theatrical Stage Employees union (IATSE) Local 15 in Seattle as a part-time extra. During academic breaks, he worked for the Seattle Repertory Theatre as a stage carpenter and served as the technical director for Seattle's A Contemporary Theatre (ACT) for its 1970 summer season.

He accepted a faculty position at Marquette University in Milwaukee, Wisconsin, in 1972 where he was an assistant professor and technical director for the Drama Department of Marquette's School of Speech. In that capacity he oversaw technical requirements of the soon-to-be-built Evan P. and Marion Helfaer Theatre, consulting on both front-of-house and backstage design for the teaching and performance spaces. Determined to continue interacting and working with tech-theatre professionals in order to provide students with accurate, up-to-date curricula, he also worked as part-time extra for IATSE Local 18 in Milwaukee.

In 1980 Glerum joined Peter Albrecht Company, Inc., a Milwaukee company known for its design and manufacture of custom stage rigging systems where he was a project manager and stage system designer. In that capacity, he designed technical systems for venues in the U.S., South America, and Asia, working with architects and engineers. It was during this period that he began writing Stage Rigging Handbook, having witnessed first-hand for more than two decades what he considered a universal need for stage-rigging safety protocol.

In 1986 he joined the University of Washington faculty as a lecturer and head of its graduate Technical Theatre program, and he and his wife returned to the Seattle area. Soon after the release of Stage Rigging Handbook in April 1987, he founded his company, Jay O. Glerum, Inc. on July 15, 1987, to sort out the increasing demands for his services as a consultant. On April 4, 1990, he amended the company's name to Jay O. Glerum & Associates, Inc., to better represent collaborations done when he contracted with other specialists in the entertainment industry. He remained the company's only employee, however, for the duration of its existence.

While Glerum was at the University of Washington, campus development and strategic placement of new buildings meant the removal of its small arena theater, the Penthouse, built in 1939 by the WPA and the first theater-in-the-round in America. The idea for theatre in the round had been conceived by Glenn Hughes, head of the Drama Department at the University of Washington from 1930 to 1961. Demolition of the Penthouse was scheduled to make way for a new Physics Building in1990. Glerum recalled hearing from Hughes, then an Emeritus Professor, that the Penthouse was designed to be movable, and only when Glerum researched and located the original plans in the UW archives, did the possibility of saving the Penthouse become a reality. The University revamped its plans for the small 165-seat theatre's demolition and agreed to move it to a different location on campus. It was subsequently refurbished, renamed Glenn Hughes Penthouse Theatre, and was reopened in its new location on campus in 1991.

As Glerum's work became nationally recognized, he resigned his position at the University of Washington in 1992 to be a full-time consultant to the entertainment industry, focusing on inspecting rigging systems, consulting on new construction and renovation of theaters, teaching rigging seminars for professional stagehands, and training employees of entertainment parks and performance centers. In its early years, the company also accepted expert witness work, but by 2000 he had eliminated that side of the business. He dissolved the company, a Washington State corporation, effective Feb. 24, 2014.

When he turned sixty, Glerum determined that he wanted to spend the remainder of his working life focusing on safety inspections and master classes. To that end, he would cease consulting with architects and engineers on construction and renovations of physical theater buildings. To close out that part of his career, he accepted his last consultancy project for Main Stage Theatre in Olney, Maryland (which was completed in 2000), the venue of his first foray into professional theatre with the Catholic University Players.

Although he accepted fewer jobs after entering his seventies, Glerum remained engaged and passionate about his work and never retired. He upheld his agreement to teach a pre-conference two-day master class for United States Institute for Theatre Technology (USITT) at the March 2014 conference in Fort Worth, Texas, despite a terminal illness. He died in June of that year.

== Honors ==
Glerum was active in USITT for more than forty years, joining in 1973 and serving on the Board and Technical Production Commissioner in the 1980s. He received the Joel E. Rubin Founder's Award in 2001 and the Health and Safety Award in 1992, and he was elected a Fellow of USITT in 1995.

Jay was elected to IATSE 80 in Los Angeles as an honorary member (never having worked for long enough periods of time to qualify as a full-time stagehand—an essential qualifier for union membership), an honor which touched him deeply. He didn't travel to Los Angeles have the membership bestowed on him in person, so he could not be considered a member of IATSE.

== Legacy ==
Jay O. Glerum Masterclasses with specific workshops for entry-level, intermediate, and advanced stagehands are offered through USITT each summer. They were established in 2016 to honor Glerum's passion for rigging safety and training. The classes take place in varying locales throughout the U.S.
