= Donn B. Murphy =

American theatre director and writer (1930–2022)

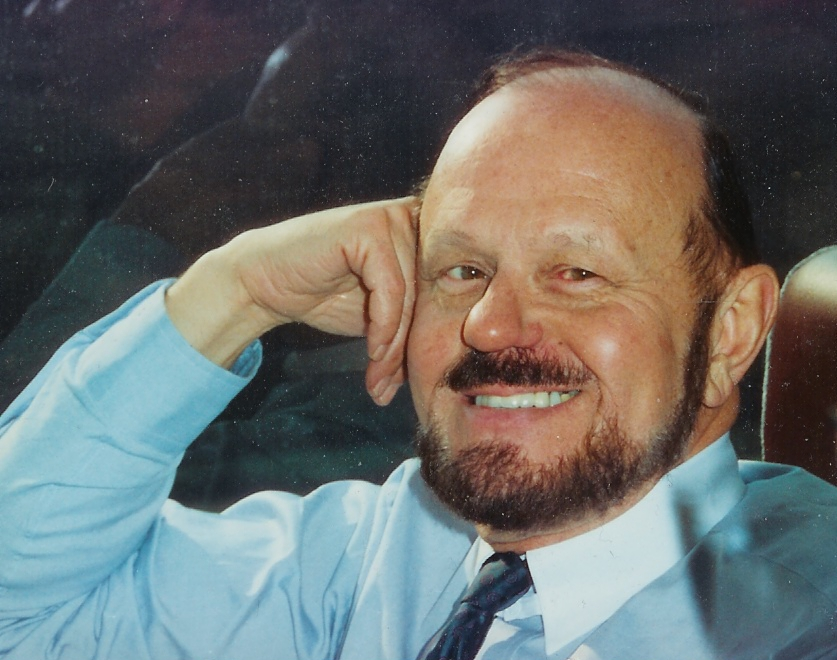
- Murphy circa 2000
- Born: July 21, 1930; San Antonio, Texas, U.S.
- Died: April 3, 2022 (aged 91); Fort Lauderdale, Florida, U.S.
- Education: Ph.D.
- Alma mater: Benedictine College, Catholic University, University of Wisconsin–Madison
- Known for: Theatre Teacher and Advisor

Donn B. Murphy (July 21, 1930 – April 3, 2022) taught theatre and speech courses at Georgetown University from 1954 to 2000. At the invitation of Jacqueline Kennedy and Letitia Baldrige, he became a theatrical advisor to the John F. Kennedy and Lyndon B. Johnson Administrations for White House dramatic and music presentations in the East Room (1961–1965). He was a founding member of the National Theatre Corporation (1974) and was Vice-President and then President and Executive Director of the National Theatre in Washington, D.C. from 1974 to 2010.

== Biography ==
Born in San Antonio, Texas, Murphy grew up in Leavenworth, Kansas, where his father, Arthur Morton Murphy, a Knight of the Order of the Holy Sepulchre, was president of Saint Mary College (now the University of Saint Mary (Kansas)). His mother, Claire Frances McCarthy Murphy, wrote children's stories. He graduated from Sacred Heart School and Immaculata High School in Leavenworth, and Saint Benedict's College (now Benedictine College) in Atchison, Kansas.

He served three years in the National Guard, 174th Military Police Battalion, in Leavenworth, Kansas. When the unit was activated in October, 1950 during the Korean War, he served as a Corporal for one year at 5th Army Headquarters, Fort Sheridan, Illinois, and then for one year at Camp Drake, Japan. In Yokohama he studied on special assignment under Margaret E. Lynn in the U.S. Army Entertainment Program.

In Tokyo, he met Rev. Gilbert V. Hartke, O.P., who was touring with Players Incorporated (now National Players) which Hartke had established at Catholic University in Washington, D.C. Murphy subsequently earned a Master's Degree in Speech and Drama at C.U. on the G.I. Bill under Hartke. He acted and did technical work with the Players at St. Michael's Summer Theatre in Winooski, Vermont. He later earned a PhD in Theatre and Psychology on a Ford Foundation Fellowship at the University of Wisconsin–Madison. He was Lighting Director at Starlight Theatre in Kansas City, Missouri for two summers, where he worked with Jeanette MacDonald, Gisèle MacKenzie, Penny Singleton and Charles Nelson Reilly. He was an Assistant Director at NBC-TV Channel 4 in Washington for one summer, where he worked with puppeteer Jim Henson, then a college student. He studied Psychodrama under James Enneis at St. Elizabeth's Hospital in Washington, D.C., and with Jacob L. Moreno at Beacon, New York.

He served on the National Advisory Board for City at Peace, and the Advisory Boards of The Playwright's Forum and the Synetic Theatre in Washington, D.C.

He became partners with H. Jones "Jon" Carrow, III in 1990. Col. Carrow, US Army ret., and Dr. Murphy, were married in Vermont in 2010, and subsequently retired to Fort Lauderdale, FL.

== Achievements ==
Murphy was on the faculty of Georgetown University from 1954 through 1999, retiring as professor emeritus. He taught successively in the Departments of English, Fine Arts, and Art Music and Theatre [now the Program in Performing Arts], and in the School for Summer and Continuing Education. He taught, at various times, Acting, Improvisation, Performing Arts in Contemporary Society, Playwriting, Public Speaking, Television Production, Theatre History and Theatrical Design.

For 21 years, he directed the Mask and Bauble Dramatic Society at Georgetown (1955–1976). He staged plays in the McDonough Gymnasium and in ornate Gaston Hall, where one of his star players was future Supreme Court Justice Antonin Scalia. He also mounted productions in the theatre at Holy Trinity Church near the campus, and in Stage One, a 100-seat black box theatre which he and his students created in a basement storage area in Poulton Hall (a "temporary" classroom building built during WWII, but still in use in 2014).

Stressing the value of original writing, Murphy encouraged his students by establishing a one-act play contest and producing three winning plays each year. He also oversaw the development of the Calliope series of annual musicals, and directed the first 15 of these productions. He supervised the first directing projects of Jack Hofsiss, who would later direct the Tony-Award Winning The Elephant Man on Broadway. When John Guare was a Georgetown student, Murphy directed Guare's first play, The Toadstool Boy, and Guare's musical, The Thirties Girl. A generation later the Donn B. Murphy One-Acts Festival was established in his honor.

For 19 years, Dr. Murphy conducted a theatre workshop for patients at the Chestnut Lodge Psychoanalytic Hospital in Rockville, MD, where he produced and directed, among other plays, A View from the Bridge, Under Milk Wood, The Glass Menagerie, Hay Fever, The Importance of Being Earnest, Picnic, John Brown's Body and Dark of the Moon (1960–1979).

In 1960 he wrote Papers of Fire, a pageant dealing with America's founding documents, which was presented at the National Sylvan Theater on the grounds of the Washington Monument. His doctoral dissertation, Dramatic Portrayals of Christ (1964), written at the University of Wisconsin–Madison dealt with the Oberammergau Passion Play, and a variety of other theatrical manifestations of Jesus Christ.

With Kathleen Barry he wrote, produced, designed, directed and appeared in five interactive participatory children's shows, performed twice each weekday for six weeks over five summers at the Wolf Trap National Park for the Performing Arts (1975–1979). They were Creation of the World, Creation of the Nation, The Curious Computer from Planet Z, Happy Landings, and The Magic Falcon. In 1984, Murphy wrote Eleanor Roosevelt: First Lady of the World, a dramatic reading commissioned by the Smithsonian Institution National Museum of American History, and presented there under his direction, starring Susan Stamberg and Jean Stapleton.

He appeared as Major Andrew Ellicott, the surveyor who placed the original boundary markers for the District of Columbia, in the Francis Thompson documentary film about the founding of Washington, DC, called City Out of Wilderness.

He was a founding member of the non-profit National Theatre Corporation, established in 1974, to save National Theatre (Washington, D.C.), which opened in 1858, and has been rebuilt several times, but still stands on its original foundations three blocks from the White House, from razing, as part of a redevelopment of Pennsylvania Avenue. He was a principal negotiator in the 1983 renovation of the building, and became the institution's President and Executive Director. This "Theatre of Presidents" has existed at the same location on Pennsylvania Avenue since 1835, albeit partially rebuilt several times. It is the longest continually operated Class-A Legitimate touring house in the United States. All but two U.S. Presidents since 1835 (Jackson and Hoover) have been known to attend performances there.

== Publications ==
Murphy wrote A Director's Guide to Good Theatre, (1968) which was published in Washington, DC, by the National Contemporary Theatre Conference (formerly the National Catholic Theatre Conference).

With Douglas Lee and Roger Meersman, he wrote Stage for a Nation: the National Theatre - 150 Years published by University Press of America (1985), a chronicle not only of the National Theatre, but in large measure a history of professional theatre in the national capital.

He is co-author, with Stephen Moore, of Helen Hayes: A Bio-bibliography (1993). Together, Moore and Murphy wrote a number of articles published in magazines and newspapers.

== Awards and honors ==
Murphy won the Best Director Award from the Greater Washington, D.C., Theatre Alliance in 1960 and 1961, and received a Ford Foundation Fellowship in 1963-1964. He was invited by President Lyndon B. Johnson to the signing of the National Endowment for the Arts legislation in the White House Rose Garden in 1965, and received Special Awards from the U.S. Army Theatre Project of the American Theatre Association in 1968 and 1970. He received a commendation in the Congressional Record on December 3, 1984. He was awarded the competitive College Dean's Georgetown Faculty Award for Distinguished Teaching in 1998, and was named Georgetown Professor Emeritus in 2000. He was elected to the Georgetown Theater Hall of Fame in 2002. In 2008 he was nominated to knighthood in the Roman Catholic Equestrian Order of the Holy Sepulchre of Jerusalem.
