= Margaret E. Lynn =

Theater director, producer, teacher (1921–2002)

Margaret Eleanor Lynn
- Born: Margaret Eleanor Linskie; April 28, 1921; Dallas, Texas
- Died: June 11, 2002 (aged 81); Fairfax, Virginia
- Education: Catholic University of America
- Occupation(s): Head of U.S. Army Music and Theater Program
- Known for: Directing U.S. Army worldwide entertainment program

Margaret E. Lynn (April 28, 1921 – June 11, 2002) was an American theater director and producer who formalized U.S. Army entertainment, beginning in Korea in the 1950s. Building on the tradition of Civil War camp shows, and a military show Yip Yip Yaphank created by Irving Berlin as a soldier in World War I, she eventually developed the U.S. Army Entertainment program, inspiring, supporting, and coordinating theatrical and music programs at Army bases worldwide.

== Biography ==
Born Margaret Eleanor Linskie, in Dallas, Texas, she earned a Bachelor of Arts degree from Southern Methodist University in 1942. In 1965, she was named the university's Distinguished Alumni Award [Dead link] as the "Woman of Achievement" for the decade of the 1940s. She earned a master's degree in Speech and Drama at the Catholic University of America in Washington, DC, in 1943, studying with the renowned Rev. Gilbert V. Hartke, O.P.

Under her stage name, Margaret Lynn, she was a dancer and dance captain with the Radio City Rockettes in New York City, and appeared in seven Broadway shows, including Oklahoma!, Carousel, and Mike Todd's Mexican Hayride. She played the ingenue lead, as well as understudying Ethel Merman in Something for the Boys.

In 1945, she was chosen by Peggy Wood and Paul Green to be among the first civilian "actress technicians" employed by the U.S. government to work with troops overseas following World War II. Under commanding officer and stage director Joshua Logan, she worked on dozens of productions for the military. She continued to conceive and direct shows during the Korean War, bringing entertainment, sometimes under artillery fire, to military personnel of various United Nations units involved in that conflict.

== Achievements ==
Lynn was eventually put in charge of soldier show entertainment at Army Headquarters in Washington, DC, where she organized companies of service personnel touring shows. In time,she organized and supported a network of some 200 full-time civilian directors on military bases around the world. She obtained production and musical performance rights, created "How To" handbooks complete with scene designs and music. She set up worldwide Army Entertainment competitions, sending theatre professionals to bases to adjudicate shows, give support and feed-back to post entertainment directors, and select the best musical performers, who were then brought to Washington for a public showcase which she directed. The Washington Post observed that she had created "the largest producing organization of theatre and music in the world."

In addition to "soldiers entertaining soldiers", Lynn stressed the benefits of including dependent wives and children actively in the performing arts, and the desirability of involving civilians from nearby towns as an antidote to the social isolation of service personnel working far from home. Under her guidance, numerous workshops, showcases, worldwide competitions, and scholarships were established to discover and encourage talented members of the military.

Under Lynn's ambitious inspiration, dedicated music rehearsal facilities, proscenium stages, "black box" theatre studios, and dinner theatres were established in unused army movie houses, barracks, and other surplus facilities, where colonels, corporals, and civilians created theatre together. Not content with makeshift "soldier shows", her directors produced themed variety bills, Broadway musicals, comedy, serious drama, and occasionally Shakespeare. She loved to recount the great success of one of Father Hartke's Shakespeare productions from Catholic University, for which she arranged a tour of military bases. Enormous crowds cheered the comedy erroneously announced to troops stationed all over the Far East as "Love, Labor and Lust".

With her protégé Donn B. Murphy, she established summer workshops at Georgetown University to which she brought Army entertainment directors from all over the world who met with civilian theater directors, producers, and teachers.

The caliber and breadth of the Army music and theatre activities from the 1950s into the 1980s are a tribute to Lynn and to the many professionals and amateurs whom she involved, inspired, and supported at installations at home and overseas. Extensive documentation on this work is preserved in the Margaret E. Lynn Army Music and Theatre Collection, 1967–1978 at the New York Public Library Performing Arts Research Center at Lincoln Center .

In 1971, she assisted in arrangements for the debut of the Walt Disney World Symphony Orchestra, which brought together 145 musicians from 66 countries to perform concerts in New York at Lincoln Center for the Performing Arts and the John F. Kennedy Center for the Performing Arts, and to celebrate the opening of Walt Disney World In Florida.

In 1982, Lynn left the Department of the Army and formed her own company, called Creative Consultants. She was simultaneously named general manager of the World Showcase Festival Program for the Disney organization. She brought more than 1,100 dancers, singers, and other performing artists from 23 countries to Orlando for the opening of EPCOT Center at Walt Disney World on October 1, 1982. The groups, including Moroccan dancers and drummers, Italian flag twirlers and members of Canada's Royal Mounted Police, performed in the park's World Showcase area. Lynn also coordinated the gathering of water from rivers in far-flung parts of the globe, which were ceremoniously poured into the Fountain of Nations in the Future World section of EPCOT. Later in life, she taught evening theater classes for adults in Virginia, and organized theater-going experiences for them which involved play-going in Washington and after-show meetings with actors and directors, as well as trips to New York with Broadway shows and lunches at Vincent Sardi's famous theater restaurant.
