= National Theatre (Washington, D.C.) =

Theatre in Washington, D.C., United States

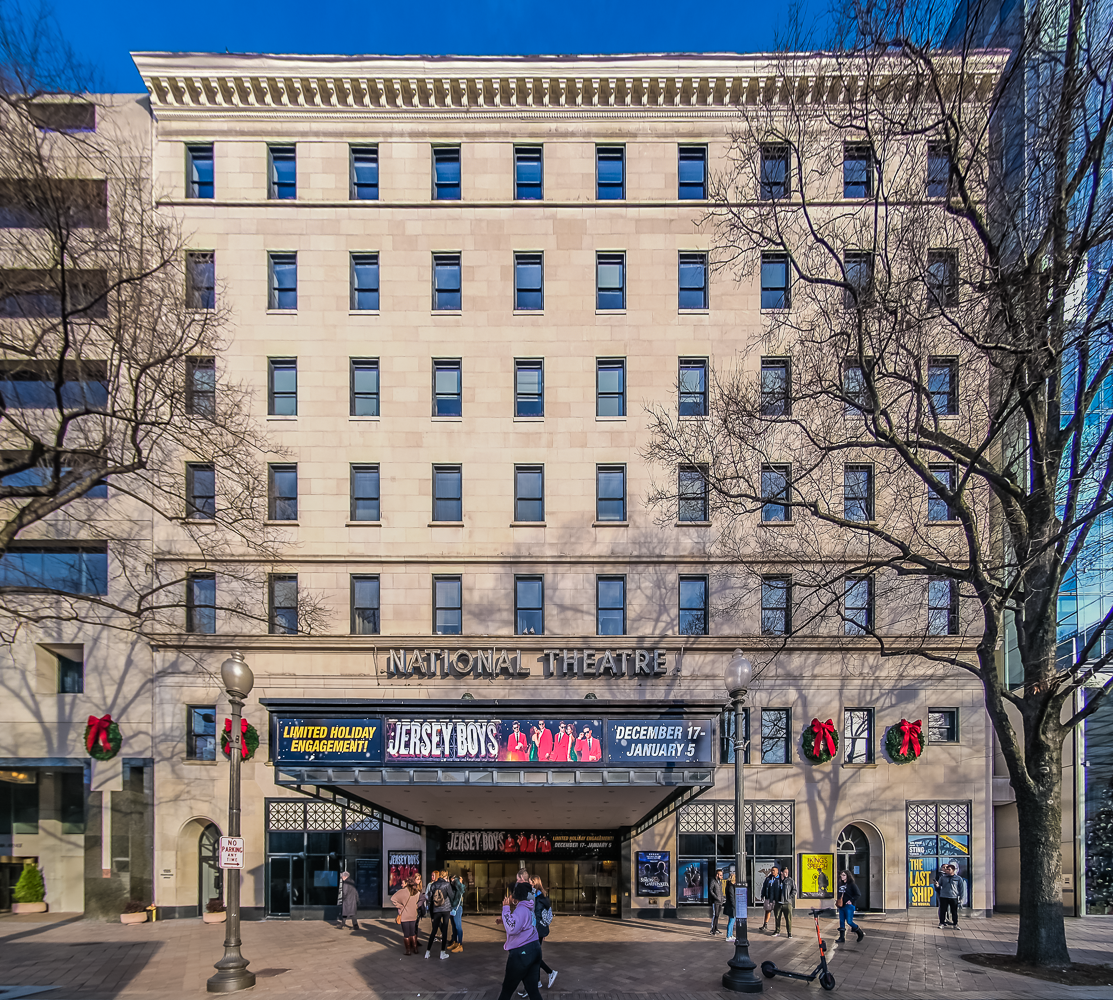
- National Theatre in December 2019

- Location in the United States Location in Washington, D.C.
- Former names: New National Theatre
- Address: 1321 Pennsylvania Avenue NW; Washington, D.C. United States
- Coordinates: 38.8963°N 77.0305°W
- Owner: Quadrangle Development Corporation
- Operator: The Nederlander Organization
- Capacity: 1,705

Construction
- Opened: 1835; 191 years ago
- Reopened: 1923; 103 years ago

Tenant
- National Theatre Foundation

Website
- www.thenationaldc.org

National Theatre is a public theatre in downtown Washington, D.C., just east of the White House. The theatre functions as a venue for live stage productions and has a seating capacity of 1,676. Despite its name, it is not a government-funded national theatre, and instead operates as a private, non-profit organization.

Founded in 1835, National Theatre is the second-oldest continuously operating theater company in the United States after Walnut Street Theatre in Philadelphia, which was founded in 1808. The original theatre was destroyed by fire in 1873. It was quickly rebuilt, but this second structure was destroyed in a second fire in 1885. A third structure opened as the New National Theatre in 1885 and operated under this name into the 1920s. In 1922 a major renovation and expansion was undertaken of that theatre which remains the current theatre.

== History ==
=== 19th century ===
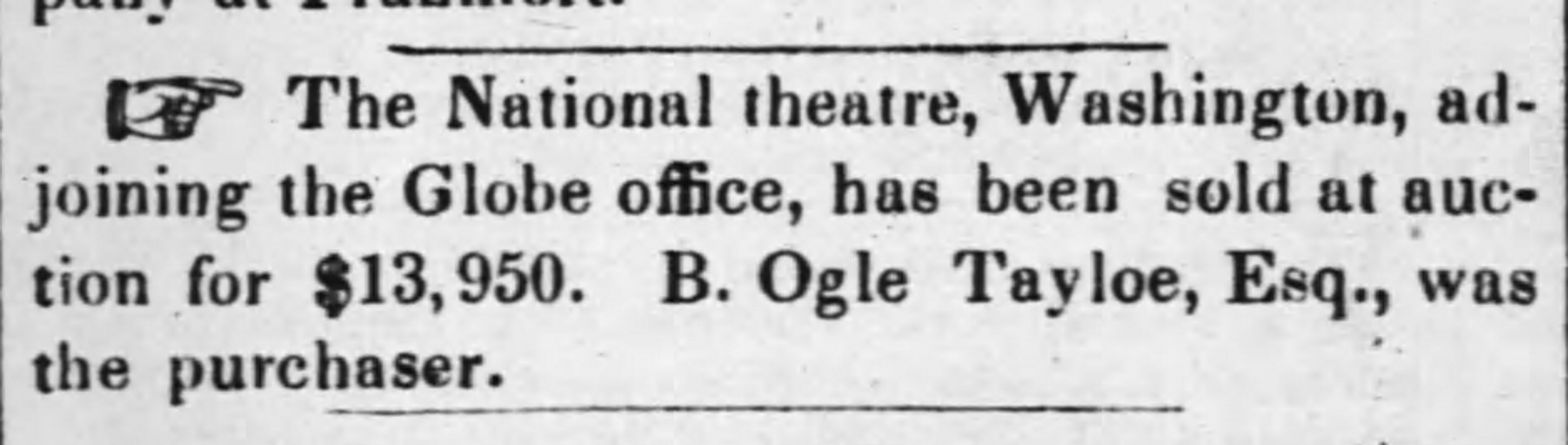
The Times Picayune reporting on the theatre's sale in November 1844

National Theatre was founded on December 7, 1835, by William Wilson Corcoran and other prominent citizens who wanted the national capital to have a first-rate theatre. The theatre's initial production was Man of the World. It was purchased in 1844 by Benjamin Ogle Tayloe of the B.O. Tayloe House for $13,950.

The theatre has been in almost continuous operation since, at the same Pennsylvania Avenue location three blocks from the White House. The theater has entertained every U.S. President since Andrew Jackson. Its name was changed at times to "Grover's National Theatre," and "Grover's Theatre" when it was managed by Leonard Grover. Actor Joseph Jefferson managed the theatre at one time.

On April 14, 1865, Tad Lincoln was attending a performance of Aladdin and the Wonderful Lamp at Grover's Theater when his father, President Abraham Lincoln, was assassinated at nearby Ford's Theatre.

=== 20th century ===
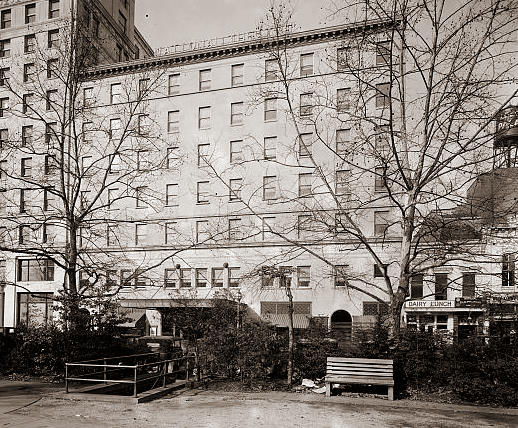
Exterior view of the National Theatre, c. 1920s

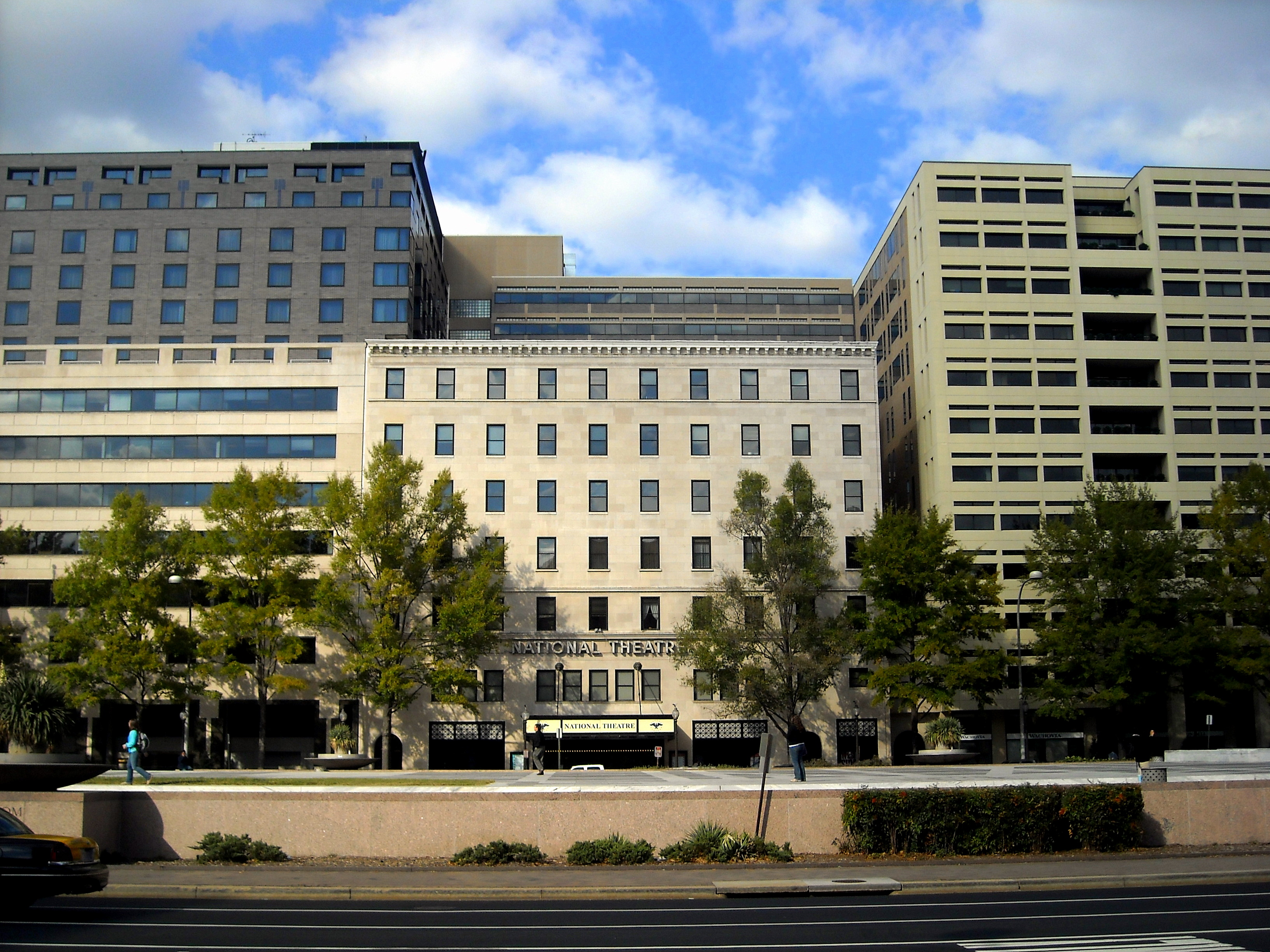
National Theatre is located across from Freedom Plaza (foreground)

The structure has been rebuilt several times, including partial reconstructions after five fires in the 19th century. The current building, at 1321 Pennsylvania Avenue NW, was constructed in 1923, opening in September of that year.

Like many theatres in the U.S. prior to the Civil Rights Movement, the National Theatre was racially segregated. Black actors were allowed to appear on stage, but African American audience members were relegated to a special section. During the Washington run of Porgy and Bess in 1936, the cast, led by Todd Duncan, protested the audience's segregation. Duncan stated that he "would never play in a theatre which barred him from purchasing tickets to certain seats because of his race." Management allowed for the first integrated performance at National Theatre. A movement to integrate the playhouse was spearheaded by actress Helen Hayes, educator Gilbert V. Hartke, O.P., Washington art impresario Patrick Hayes, and Washington Post theatre critic Richard L. Coe. When that effort failed, they persuaded Actors Equity performers to refuse to play at the theatre. Rather than desegregate, the New York management discontinued live performances in 1948. One prestige attraction, the Washington premier of the British film The Red Shoes, was presented. Earlier, in 1941, Walt Disney's Fantasia played at the theatre for seven weeks, also as a prestige attraction. Then the theatre remained dark until it reopened as an integrated theater in 1952.

In 1970, the theatre came under the management of the Nederlander Organization. In 1974, the not-for-profit National Theatre Corporation was established by Roger L. Stevens, Maurice B. Tobin, Donn B. Murphy, and others to save the failing enterprise, in the wake of racial riots, and a downtown made unfashionable by the growth of the surrounding suburbs.

The theatre underwent a major renovation from 1982 to 1983 when the original wing housing dressing rooms was replaced with a modern structure. The refurbished structure opened in concert with the redevelopment of that part of downtown Washington, D.C., which included The Shops at National Place, the 774-room flagship JW Marriott Hotel, and National Press Club. Stage designer Oliver Smith supervised the interior design.

The 1835 stone foundations and brick stage house still exist, although the rock work is now reinforced with steel caissons to resist erosion by the Tiber Creek, which flows beneath the building. From the stage, President Ronald Reagan saluted the refurbished "neighborhood theatre" in January 1984. Among the Broadway productions which have had out-of-town try-outs at the National are Amadeus, Beetlejuice, Crazy for You, Hello, Dolly!, If/Then, Show Boat, Mean Girls, and West Side Story.

=== 21st century ===
In 2012, Jam Theatricals assumed operations for the theatre from the Shubert Organization. Jam Theatricals and Nederlander National Markets LLC merged in 2019, and the Nederlander family resumed management of the theater.

In May 2024, it was announced that the city government in Washington, D.C. was in talks to buy the venue and renovate it. The government plans on leasing the theater for 99 years to the company that currently owns it.

== Performers ==
Performers who have appeared at the theatre include Pearl Bailey, Ethel Barrymore, Lionel Barrymore and John Barrymore, Warren Beatty, Sarah Bernhardt, Claire Bloom, Edwin Booth, John Wilkes Booth, Fanny Brice, Tom Burke, Carol Channing, George M. Cohan, Claudette Colbert, Katharine Cornell, Hume Cronyn, Tim Curry, Denishawn, Ruth Draper, Todd Duncan, Maurice Evans, Craig Ferguson, Lillian Gish, Ruth Gordon, Valerie Harper, Julie Harris, Rex Harrison, Helen Hayes, Audrey Hepburn, Katharine Hepburn, Joseph Jefferson, James Earl Jones, Lucille La Verne, Eva LeGallienne, Jerry Lewis, Alfred Lunt and Lynn Fontanne, Eartha Kitt, Ian McKellen, Mary Martin, Ethel Merman, Idina Menzel, Virginia Monier, Rita Moreno, Helen Morgan, Rosie O'Donnell, Laurence Olivier, Annie Oakley, Geraldine Page, Robert Redford, Debbie Reynolds, Chita Rivera, Will Rogers, Rosalind Russell, George C. Scott, Kevin Spacey, Sting, Jessica Tandy, Norma Terris, Marlo Thomas, Lily Tomlin, Franchot Tone, Rip Torn and Liv Ullmann. Winston Churchill once spoke from the stage.

== Operations ==
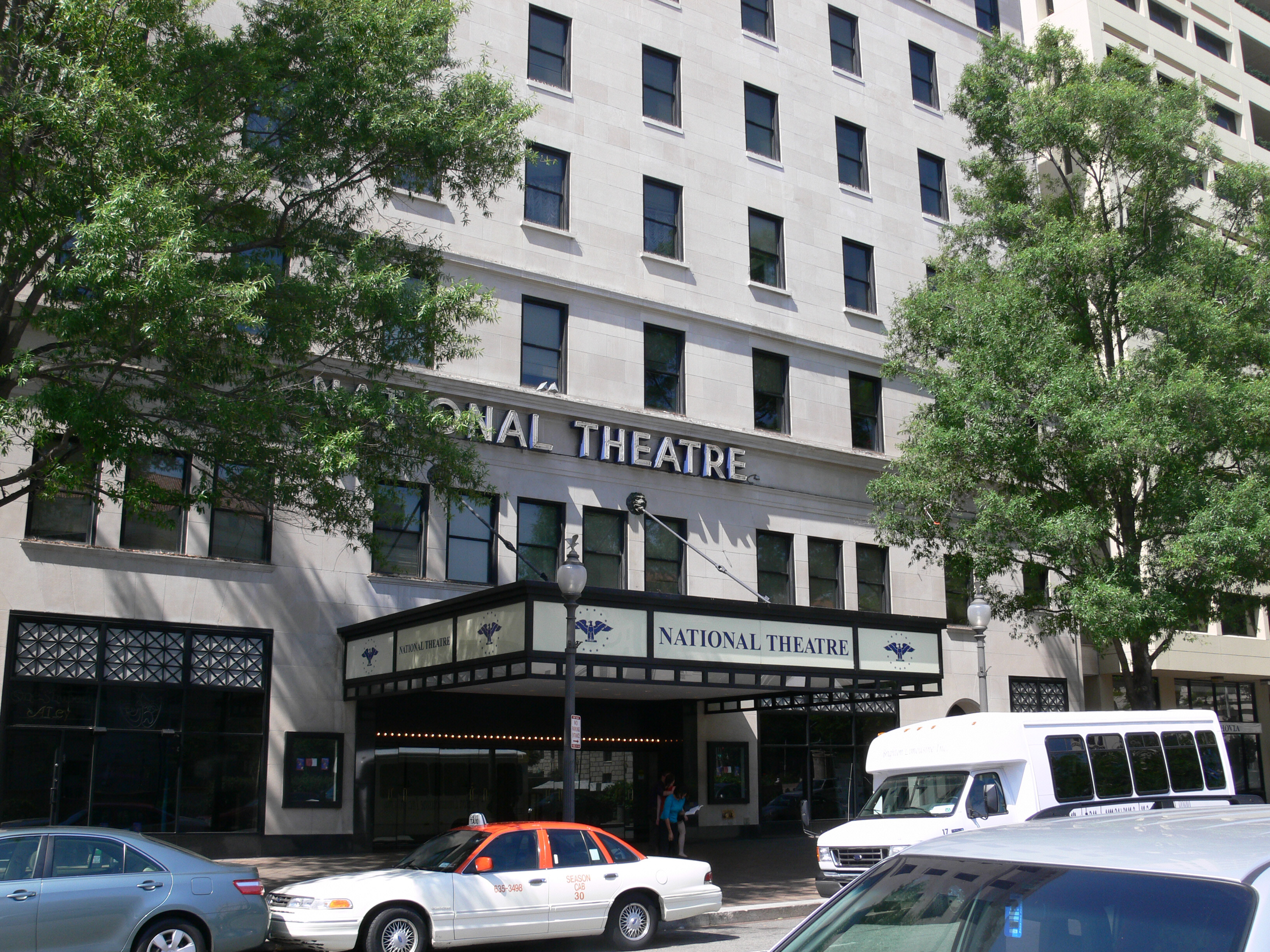
The exterior of the theatre in May 2007

National Theatre has expanded its activities to include Broadway musical performances, concerts, lectures, opera, ballet, seminars, and receptions. The National Theatre Foundation is the non-profit organization that oversees operations of the theatre, as well as management of a suite of free community engagement programs including Saturday Morning Live! At The National, Community Stage Connections, and Teens Behind the Scenes. David J. Kitto is the Executive Director. The National Theatre Group (Nederlander National Markets LLC) manages the daily activities of the theatre and provides content for the main stage.

== See also ==
- Theater in Washington D.C.
