= The 100 Lives of Black Jack Savage =

- Genre: Comedy drama; Fantasy
- Created by: James Wong; Glen Morgan; Stephen J. Cannell
- Developed by: The Walt Disney Company
- Written by: James Wong; Glen Morgan; Stephen J. Cannell; Jack Bernstein; Gary Rosen
- Directed by: Kim Manners; Tucker Gates; Bruce Kessler; Jorge Montesi; David Nutter; James Whitmore Jr.
- Starring: Daniel Hugh Kelly; Steven Williams; Roma Downey; Bert Rosario; Steve Hytner
- Theme music composer: Mike Post
- Composer: Mike Post
- Country of origin: United States
- Original language: English
- No. of seasons: 1
- No. of episodes: 7

Production
- Executive producer: Stephen J. Cannell
- Producer: John Peter Kousakis
- Cinematography: Frank Johnson, A.S.C.
- Running time: 42 minutes
- Production companies: Stephen J. Cannell Productions; Walt Disney Television

Original release
- Network: NBC
- Release: March 31 – May 26, 1991

Disney Presents The 100 Lives of Black Jack Savage is an American fantasy comedy-drama television series broadcast in the United States by NBC and produced by Stephen J. Cannell Productions in association with Walt Disney Television. The show originated as a television film. The program originally aired from March 31 to May 26, 1991, and lasted less than one season.

== Plot ==
The series followed the story of Black Jack Savage (Steven Williams), (Note: Black Jack Savage was played by Stoney Jackson in the pilot.) the ghost of a legendary 17th-century Caribbean pirate who teams up with Barry Tarberry (Daniel Hugh Kelly), a crooked Wall Street con artist who has escaped trial by coming to the Caribbean. Facing eternal damnation, both of them discover that they need to save 100 lives to compensate for the damage done by their sinful lives, and thus save their own souls.

Any time Black Jack tries to leave the safety of his castle haunt on San Pietro Island, he is fair game for the "snarks". They are entities that can transport Jack to Hell through an entrance at the base of the tree where he was originally hanged. Tarberry has his own difficulties dodging the government agents sent to extradite him back to the United States to stand trial for his crimes. Other characters on San Pietro include the corrupt governor-general, Abel Vasquez (Bert Rosario), with whom Tarberry is able to make another deal, and island activist Danielle (Roma Downey), who is constantly trying to help protect the locals from the effects of Vasquez's corruption and is not above enlisting Tarberry's help in doing so.

The show follows the misadventures of both Black Jack and his human counterpart as they team up to dodge the law, both supernatural and secular, to make their 100 soul quota and thus win their way to salvation. Each episode ended with a graphic telling the viewers "??? Lives To Go..."

=== Blackbird powerboat ===
A regular part of every episode was an appearance of the high tech powerboat. Built by scientist/inventor Logan "FX" Murphy (played by Steve Hytner), the Blackbird was a black trimaran speedboat that resembled a SR-71 reconnaissance plane. It was originally commissioned by the previous owner of Blackbird Castle, a drug runner. After his arrest, Tarberry took possession of the Blackbird from Murphy. When not in use, the Blackbird was moored at a secret dock at Blackbird Castle on San Pietro Island.

== Cast ==
- Stoney Jackson as Black Jack Savage (pilot episode)
- Steven Williams as Black Jack Savage (series)
- Roma Downey as Danielle
- Daniel Hugh Kelly as Barry Tarberry
- Bert Rosario as Abel Vasquez
- Steve Hytner as Logan "FX" Murphy

== Episodes ==
No.	Title	Directed by	Written by	Original release date
1	"Pilot"	Kim Manners	Stephen J. Cannell	March 31, 1991
2	"A Pirate Story"	Kim Manners	Stephen J. Cannell	April 5, 1991
3	"A Day in the Life of Logan Murphy"	Tucker Gates	Glen Morgan & James Wong	April 12, 1991
4	"Deals Are Made to Be Broken"	David Nutter	Glen Morgan & James Wong	April 19, 1991
5	"Look for the Union Label"	James Whitmore Jr.	Jack Bernstein	May 12, 1991
6	"The Not-So-Great Dictator"	Jorge Montesi	Gary Rosen	May 19, 1991
7	"For Whom the Wedding Bell Tolls"	Bruce Kessler	Gary Rosen	May 26, 1991
