= Virginia Monier =

American stage actress and theatre manager

Virginia Monier (fl. 1860), was an American stage actress and theatre manager. She was one of the first female theatre managers in the United States.

Monier was the daughter of two actors. She made her stage debut in New York City as a child. She returned to New York after eight years in 1834. She was described as beautiful and talented. Among her roles were Desdemona, Dinah Primroses, Julia Faulkners and Emily Worthington.

She was the founder-manager of the Miss Monier's Dramatic Saloon in New York City in 1837. She was the star attraction of the National Theatre (Washington, D.C.) between 1838 and 1841. She was the manager of the Washington Theatre in Washington, D.C. in 1840–1841, which made her a pioneer in a period when it was still unusual for women to manage and found theatres in the USA. Her tenure was described as a success.

After 1841, she had a successful career as an actor. She married a British captain named Wynne and emigrated to Great Britain, where she performed on Drury Lane as Mrs Haller in 1846.

After her retirement she settled in Boulogne in France, where she was still documented in 1860.
