= Nowhere to Hide (1987 film) =

1987 film by Mario Philip Azzopardi

- Theatrical movie poster
- Directed by: Mario Azzopardi
- Written by: George Goldsmith; Alex Rebar
- Produced by: Julie Corman; Andras Hamori; John Kemeny; Stéphane Reichel
- Starring: Amy Madigan; Michael Ironside; John Colicos; Daniel Hugh Kelly; Robin MacEachern
- Cinematography: Vic Sarin
- Edited by: Susan Schneir; Rit Wallis
- Music by: Brad Fiedel
- Production company: Alliance Entertainment
- Distributed by: New Century Entertainment Corporation
- Release date: July 17, 1987 (USA)
- Running time: 90 minutes
- Countries: Canada; United States
- Language: English
- Budget: Can$6 million

Nowhere to Hide is a 1987 thriller film directed by Mario Azzopardi. It stars Amy Madigan, Daniel Hugh Kelly and Robin MacEachern, as a family on the run from corrupt Marine officers. It also stars Michael Ironside, John Colicos, Maury Chaykin, and Clark Johnson.

== Plot ==
When two newly delivered helicopters crash mysteriously, Marine officer Major Rob Cutter (Daniel Hugh Kelly) decides to conduct his own investigation, since the men killed in the helicopter crashes were members of his squadron. He later discovers that the newly delivered helicopters crashed because of a defective C-ring that broke due to having been made of a less expensive, and much weaker, alloy. Rob grounds all the newly delivered helicopters that have the faulty C-ring, and decides to go public with this, much to the objection of his friend and fellow marine Sergeant Mike Watson (Chuck Shamata), who reluctantly tells someone that Rob found the problem.

At home, Rob is killed by two hitmen, one of them Marchais (Maury Chaykin), in front of Rob's son Johnny (Robin MacEachern). As Rob's wife Barbara (Amy Madigan), a former marine, was spotted by Marchais, she hides in the garage. She burns Marchais' face with a blowtorch as he and his partner get away. She then gets upstairs to find Rob dead and Johnny traumatized by his father's death, having become mute as a result of post traumatic stress disorder. Before Rob was killed, Johnny unintentionally hid the broken C-ring fragment in his transformer bot toy.

Barbara is questioned by local police, and they find top-secret documents which the men who killed Rob planted in the vase in the main bedroom, framing him. The military takes over the investigation and Rob's commanding officer, General Clay Howard (John Colicos) bails Barbara out of the questioning. Rob's squadron gives her the American flag out of respect, since Rob didn't receive a military funeral, due to being investigated for having top-secret documents in his possession.

Persistent journalist Mark Halstead (Clark Johnson), who has been investigating the helicopter crashes and suspects a cover-up, confronts Watson about the cover-up. Watson, guilt-ridden over having a hand in Rob's death, decides to talk to Halstead the next day about the cover-up. But he is watched by Marchais and his partner, who kill Watson by forcing his car to crash. Halstead comes to the cemetery where Rob is buried, and informs Barbara about Watson's death, and that there is a cover-up involving the helicopter crashes within Rob's death, the military, and the manufacturing company who delivered the choppers. Before he can go on further, Halstead is shot and killed by Marchais, and Barbara is framed for killing him. She is able to get away after a lengthy car chase.

Barbara calls General Howard for help, only to discover that he is the one who ordered Rob killed, because Halstead told her that Howard refused to see him, and the general mistakenly lied that he knew about Watson's death through Halstead. General Howard did not want Rob to go public with the defective part, since Howard authorized the delivery of the helicopters with the defective C-ring from the manufacturing company. While hiding in the motel, Barbara spots Marchais and his partner planting a bomb in her car. Just after she put Johnny in her car, Barbara moves the bomb out of her car and plants it in the car the hitmen are using. Johnny runs back to the motel to get the robotic toy that carries the C-ring. Barbara rushes to get Johnny and get back to the car. Marchais detonates the device, unknowingly killing himself and his partner, as Barbara makes her getaway.

With no one to turn to for help, Barbara turns to Rob's Vietnam War veteran-brother Ben (Michael Ironside), a reclusive survivalist living in an isolated wilderness with his two Dobermans, to hide her and Johnny in his cabin. Johnny finds a military tracking device in the rim of their car, but can't tell anyone since he is still traumatized by Rob's death. Ben learns about Rob's death, and evaluates Johnny psychologically, knowing that he'll get over Rob's death soon. Barbara learns that Ben has become a recluse, because his son and his son's mother were killed in friendly fire in the Vietnam War, and he never talked to any of his squadron who did that bombing, except Rob who was his only trusted friend.

Barbara finds the C-ring fragment in Johnny's robotic toy, and Ben identifies that it was defective. Then the Dobermans spot Howard's men and Ben hides Johnny in the crawlspace. Barbara and Ben are able to kill some of Howard's men, but Ben is wounded in the shootout and one of his pet Dobermans is killed. Barbara is hit in the shoulder, but is able hit the flammable tank to kill some of the men, before being buried by a pile of logs. Ben gets Johnny out of the crawlspace, but a corrupt marine mortally wounds Ben and is about to get Johnny. Ben uses the last of his strength to save Johnny before dying. Johnny screams out for his mother, before being taken by Howard's remaining men.

Barbara gets out of the pile of logs and finds Ben dead and Johnny kidnapped. She takes Ben's old truck and goes to the bar where Rob's squad-mates are. She shows them the broken C-ring and informs them about the motive behind Rob's death and Howard's deceit.

Barbara goes to the abandoned warehouse where General Howard, the manufacturing company bigwigs William Devlin (Garrick Hogan) and Nick Thomas (Andrew Johnston) and their men are, handing them the C-ring part in exchange for Johnny. When Howard asks who else knew about the conspiracy, Barbara shows the corrupt general a wire she was wearing, meaning Rob's squad heard about his involvement in Rob's death, and delivering the helicopters with the faulty C-ring. Rob's squadron surrounds the warehouse, but General Howard gets into a car and makes his getaway---while running over Devlin as he drives, killing him while Rob's squad detains everyone else. Barbara, a skilled helicopter pilot, jumps into a helicopter and pursues Howard on her own, as one of Rob's men stays with Johnny. She follows General Howard to a quarry where he drives onto a cliff-side dirt road. Barbara machine guns the car, causing it to fly off the cliff. As the car is soaring over the cliff, she shoots a missile into the car resulting in a spectacular explosion and crash---thereby killing General Howard and avenging the deaths of Rob and Ben.

Barbara and Johnny clear out Ben's cabin, and take Ben's surviving Doberman with them as they head home.

== Cast ==
- Amy Madigan as Barbara Cutter
- Daniel Hugh Kelly as Rob Cutter
- Robin MacEachern as Johnny Cutter
- Michael Ironside as Ben Cutter
- John Colicos as General Clay Howard
- Chuck Shamata as Mike Watson
- Clark Johnson as Mark Halstead
- Maury Chaykin as Marchais
- Géza Kovács as Owens
- Garrick Hagon as William Devlin
- Andrew Johnston as Nick Thomas
- Timothy Webber as Kevin
- Réal Andrews as Luther
- Philip Akin as Harvey
- Peter Blackwood as Ted
- Shirley Merovitz as Shirley
- Vlasta Vrána as Sonny Cambria
- Jayne Eastwood as Jean Bollinger
- Philip Spensley as Roy Bollinger
- Ross Hull as Tory Bollinger
- Amy Gartner as Candace Bollinger
