= Daniel Hugh Kelly =

American actor

- Born: August 10, 1952 (age 74); Elizabeth, New Jersey, U.S.
- Education: Saint Vincent College; Catholic University of America
- Occupation: Actor
- Years active: 1974–present

Daniel Hugh Kelly (born August 10, 1952) is an American stage, film and television actor. He is best known for his role on the 1980s ABC TV series Hardcastle and McCormick (1983–1986) as the ex-con Mark "Skid" McCormick, co-starring with Brian Keith.

== Early life ==
The middle of five children, Kelly was born and raised in Elizabeth, New Jersey, where his grandfather and father were police officers/detectives and his mother was a social worker. He attended and graduated from Roselle Catholic High School in 1970. A graduate of St. Vincent College (Latrobe, Pennsylvania) in 1974, he pursued a Master of Fine Arts (MFA) at Catholic University (Washington, D.C.) on a full scholarship.

== Career ==
Kelly appeared in numerous Off-Broadway and Off-Off-Broadway productions, primarily at The Public Theater and Second Stage Theatre. A product of regional repertory theater, Kelly has been a company member of the Williamstown Theater Festival (Massachusetts), the Folger Theater (DC), Arena Stage (DC), and the Actors Theatre of Louisville among others.

He toured with the National Players, the oldest classical touring company in the United States. He starred on Broadway opposite Madeline Kahn's Billie in Born Yesterday in 1989, and as Brick opposite Kathleen Turner's Maggie in Cat on a Hot Tin Roof in 1990. In 2003, he appeared at the Mark Taper Forum (Los Angeles), originating the role of Richard in Living Out by Lisa Loomer.

Kelly starred on daytime TV in Ryan's Hope as Senator Frank Ryan (1978–1981). He became well known for his role on the ABC television series crime drama Hardcastle and McCormick (1983–1986) as the ex-con Mark "Skid" McCormick. Aside from Hardcastle and McCormick, he has starred in such television series as Chicago Story, I Married Dora, Second Noah, Ponderosa and Walt Disney Presents The 100 Lives of Blackjack Savage (1991) which he also co-produced. He returned to daytime television on As the World Turns, playing Col. Winston Mayer (2007–2009). He guest-starred in some television series, such as Law & Order, Law & Order: Special Victims Unit, Law & Order: Los Angeles, Memphis Beat, The West Wing, NCIS: Los Angeles, Supernatural, Major Crimes Boston Legal, Las Vegas and Walker, Texas Ranger.

Kelly also appeared in miniseries and television movies, such as Passing Glory, The Tuskegee Airmen, Citizen Cohn, From the Earth to the Moon and The Nutcracker, among others. His feature film roles include the horror film Cujo (1983), Nowhere to Hide (1987), Someone to Watch Over Me (1987), The Good Son (1993), Bad Company (1995), Star Trek: Insurrection (1998), Chill Factor (1999), and The In Crowd (2000).

== Stage ==
Broadway

- Born Yesterday – Richard Rodgers Theater (1989)
- Cat on a Hot Tin Roof – Eugene O'Neill Theatre (1990)

Off-Broadway

- Miss Margarida's Way – Public Theater (1977)
- The Hunchback of Notre Dame – Public Theater (1977)
- Fishing – Second Stage Theatre (1981)
- Juno's Swans Second Stage Theatre (1985)

Regional

- Henry IV Part 1 – National Players (1974)
- Charley's Aunt – National Players (1974)
- School for Wives – National Players (1974)
- An Enemy of the People – Arena Stage (1975)
- Once in a Lifetime – Arena Stage (1975)
- A Bird in the Hand – The Wayside Theater (1975)
- No Time for Sergeants – The Wayside Theater (1975)
- Of Mice and Men – Cohoes Music Hall (1976)
- The Best Man – Actors Theatre of Louisville (1976)
- Much Ado About Nothing – Actors Theatre of Louisville (1976)
- A Christmas Carol – Actors Theatre of Louisville (1976)
- Arturo Ui – Actors Theatre of Louisville (1977)
- The Rainmaker – Actors Theatre of Louisville (1977)
- Tennessee Williams: A Celebration – Williamstown Theatre Festival (1982)
- Room Service – Williamstown Theatre Festival (1982)
- Enemies – Williamstown Theatre Festival (1982)
- Barbarians – Williamstown Theatre Festival (1986)
- Hawthorne Country – Williamstown Theatre Festival (1986)
- The Lucky Spot – Williamstown Theatre Festival (1986)
- Living Out – Mark Taper Forum (2003)
- The Art of Losing – Blank Theatre Company (2012)

== Filmography ==
Film
Year	Title	Role	Notes
1983	Cujo	Vic Trenton	Film debut
1987	Nowhere to Hide	Rob Cutter	
1987	Someone to Watch Over Me	Scotty	
1993	The Good Son	Wallace Evans	
1995	Bad Company	Les Goodwin	
1998	Star Trek: Insurrection	Sojef, a Ba'ku man	
1999	Chill Factor	Colonel Leo Vitelli	
2000	The In Crowd	Dr. Henry Thompson	
2001	Guardian	Agent Taylor	
2005	American Gun	Don	
2006	Once Not Far from Home	The Father	Short
2011	God's Country	Mr. Randolph Whittaker	
2013	The Monkey's Paw	Gillespie	
2013	Mischief Night	David Walton	
2013	Devil May Call	Tony Taylor	
2014	Red Velvet Cake	Spencer	Short
2015	Sex, Death and Bowling	Dick McAllister	
2016	ToY	Steven	
2016	Holiday Breakup	William	
2019	Crazy Alien	The President of the United States	
2019	Among the Shadows	Bittencourt	
2019	Shevenge	Hem	Segment: "The Fetch"
2020	Skipping Stones	Mr. McDowell	
2021	Far More	Dick McAllister	

Television
Year	Title	Role	Notes
1978–1981	Ryan's Hope	Frank Ryan (#3)	Regular, 491 episodes
1981	Thin Ice	Jack	TV movie
1982	Chicago Story	Det. Frank Wajorski	Regular, 13 episodes
1983	Murder Ink	Unknown	TV movie
1983–1986	Hardcastle and McCormick	Mark 'Skid' McCormick	Regular, 67 episodes
1987	Night of Courage	Paul Forrest	TV movie
1987	Nutcracker: Money, Madness and Murder	Mike George	Miniseries (3 episodes)
1987–1988	I Married Dora	Peter Farrell	Regular, 13 episodes
1991	The 100 Lives of Black Jack Savage	Barry Tarberry	TV movie + 7 episodes
1992	Citizen Cohn	Congressman Neil Gallagher	TV movie
1993–1994	All My Children	Travis Montgomery (#2)	Regular
1994	MacShayne: The Final Roll of the Dice	Franklin Carter	TV movie
1994	Moment of Truth: Cult Rescue	Dr. Brian Allen	TV movie
1994	A Child's Cry for Help	Donald Prescott	TV movie
1995	Law & Order	Councilman Kevin Crossley	Guest, 1 episode
1995	The Tuskegee Airmen	Col. Rogers	TV movie
1995	Never Say Never: The Deidre Hall Story	Steve Sohmer	TV movie
1995	Dark Eyes	Michael McGann	Pilot (not picked up)
1996	No Greater Love	Ben Jones	TV movie
1996–1997	Second Noah	Noah Beckett	Regular, 21 episodes
1997	Stranger in my Home	Doug Martin	TV movie
1997	Five Desperate Hours	Jim Ballard	TV movie
1998	Atomic Dog	Brook Yates	TV movie
1998	Bad As I Wanna Be: The Dennis Rodman Story	Lonn Reisman	TV movie
1998	Labor of Love	Gordon Connell	TV movie
1998	From the Earth to the Moon	Gene Cernan	Miniseries (5 episodes)
1998	Oh Baby	Grant	Pilot
1999	Passing Glory	Mike Malone Sr.	TV movie
1999	Law & Order	Julian Spector	Guest, 1 episode
1999	The Outer Limits	Alex Buchanan	Guest, 1 episode
2000	Twice in a Lifetime	Rex Stanford / Charles	Guest, 1 episode
2000	Growing Up Brady	Robert Reed	TV movie
2001	Jackie, Ethel, Joan: The Women of Camelot	John F. Kennedy	Miniseries (2 episodes)
2001	Walker, Texas Ranger	Tim Preston	Guest, 1 episode
2001–2002	Ponderosa	Ben Cartwright	Regular, 19 episodes
2001	Law & Order	Lawrence Garber	Guest, 1 episode
2002	Joe and Max	Jack Dempsey	TV movie
2003	For the People	Ted Hardford	Guest, 1 episode
2003	Las Vegas	Senator William Percy Henderson	Guest, 1 episode
2004	The West Wing	James Cook	Guest, 1 episode
2005	Law & Order: Special Victims Unit	Mark Dobbins	Guest, 1 episode
2005	Supernatural	Sheriff Jake Devins	Guest, 1 episode
2005	Law & Order	Leland Barnes	Guest, 1 episode
2007–2009	As the World Turns	Colonel Winston Mayer	Recurring, 31 episodes
2008	Boston Legal	William Brewster	Guest, 1 episode
2008	Cold Case	Elliot Glock '08	Guest, 1 episode
2010	NCIS: Los Angeles	Man	Guest, 2 episodes
2010–2011	Memphis Beat	Tony Bellew	Recurring, 6 episodes
2010	Law & Order: LA	Judge Royce	Guest, 1 episode
2011	The Mentalist	Philip Carmichael	Guest, 1 episode
2013	The Exterminators	David	TV movie
2014	Castle	Evan Potter	Guest, 1 episode
2014	Growing Up Fisher	Tom Hawkins	Guest, 1 episode
2014	NCIS	Admiral Kendall	Guest, 1 episode
2016	A Father's Secret	Caswell Fox	TV movie
2016	Legends & Lies	John Hancock	Guest, 1 episode
2017	Major Crimes	Jerry Pearl	Guest, 1 episode
