= Holly Twyford =

American actress

- Education: Boston University's School of Theatre Arts
- Occupation: Stage actress / director

Holly Twyford is a Washington, D.C.–based American stage actress and director. She is a ten-time nominee and a four-time winner of the Helen Hayes Award.

== Early life and career ==
Twyford grew up in Great Falls, Virginia. She attended the School of Theatre Arts at Boston University's School of Theatre Arts before returning to the D.C. area to pursue acting. Before her theatre career was established, she worked as a bartender and in the costume department of the renowned Arena Stage, where she would later star.

Twyford has appeared in over thirty productions for organizations including Arena Stage, the Folger Shakespeare Library, Shakespeare Theatre Company, Studio Theatre, Source Theatre, Woolly Mammoth Theatre Company, Theatre J, Olney Theatre, Round House Theatre and the now-defunct Consenting Adults Theater Company, where she earned her first Helen Hayes Award nomination in 1993. She commonly collaborates with director Joe Banno on offbeat productions of Shakespeare plays, including a 1999 version of Hamlet at the Folger in which Twyford, along with three others, portrayed the protagonist as a fractured personality.

Twyford's film and television appearances include Out of Season, Pecker, Falling to Peaces and a 1997 episode of Homicide: Life on the Street.

Twyford is a lesbian and has been out for her entire career. She had been with her partner, an environmentalist, since 1992.

In a 2005 group interview with director Delia Taylor and playwright Jeanette Buck for Metro Weekly, she said that she didn't feel her homosexuality had hindered her career, but that the necessity of coming out to coworkers when starting a new job "gets to be real tiring". In the same interview, she and her colleagues also discussed the paucity of female roles and the need for more female directors, playwrights and producers in both the theatre industry and Hollywood.

== Helen Hayes Awards ==
1993	Outstanding Lead Actress, Resident Musical	
	Her Aching Heart, Consenting Adults Theatre Company	Nomination
1998	Outstanding Lead Actress, Resident Play	
	Romeo and Juliet, Folger Shakespeare Library	Award Recipient
1999	Outstanding Lead Actress, Resident Play	
	Much Ado About Nothing, Folger Shakespeare Library	Nomination
1999	Outstanding Supporting Actress, Resident Play	
	Steward of Christendom, The Studio Theatre	Nomination
2000	Outstanding Lead Actress, Resident Play	
	Desk Set, The Studio Theatre	Nomination
2001	Outstanding Lead Actress, Resident Play	
	Chesapeake, Source Theatre	Nomination
2003	Outstanding Lead Actress, Resident Play	
	Oleanna, Source Theatre	Nomination
2003	Outstanding Lead Actress, Resident Play	
	The Shape of Things, The Studio Theatre	Award Recipient
2005	Outstanding Supporting Actress, Resident Play	
	Two Gentlemen of Verona, Folger Shakespeare Library	Award Recipient
2009	Outstanding Supporting Actress, Resident Play	
	The Road to Mecca, The Studio Theatre	Nomination
2010	Outstanding Lead Actress, Resident Play	
	Arcadia, The Folger Theatre	Nomination
2010	Outstanding Lead Actress, Resident Play	
	The Little Dog Laughed, Signature Theatre	Award Recipient
2010	Outstanding Lead Actress, Resident Play	
	Lost in Yonkers, Theater J	Nomination
