= Olney Theatre Center =

Arts center in Olney, Maryland, United States

Olney Theatre Corporation

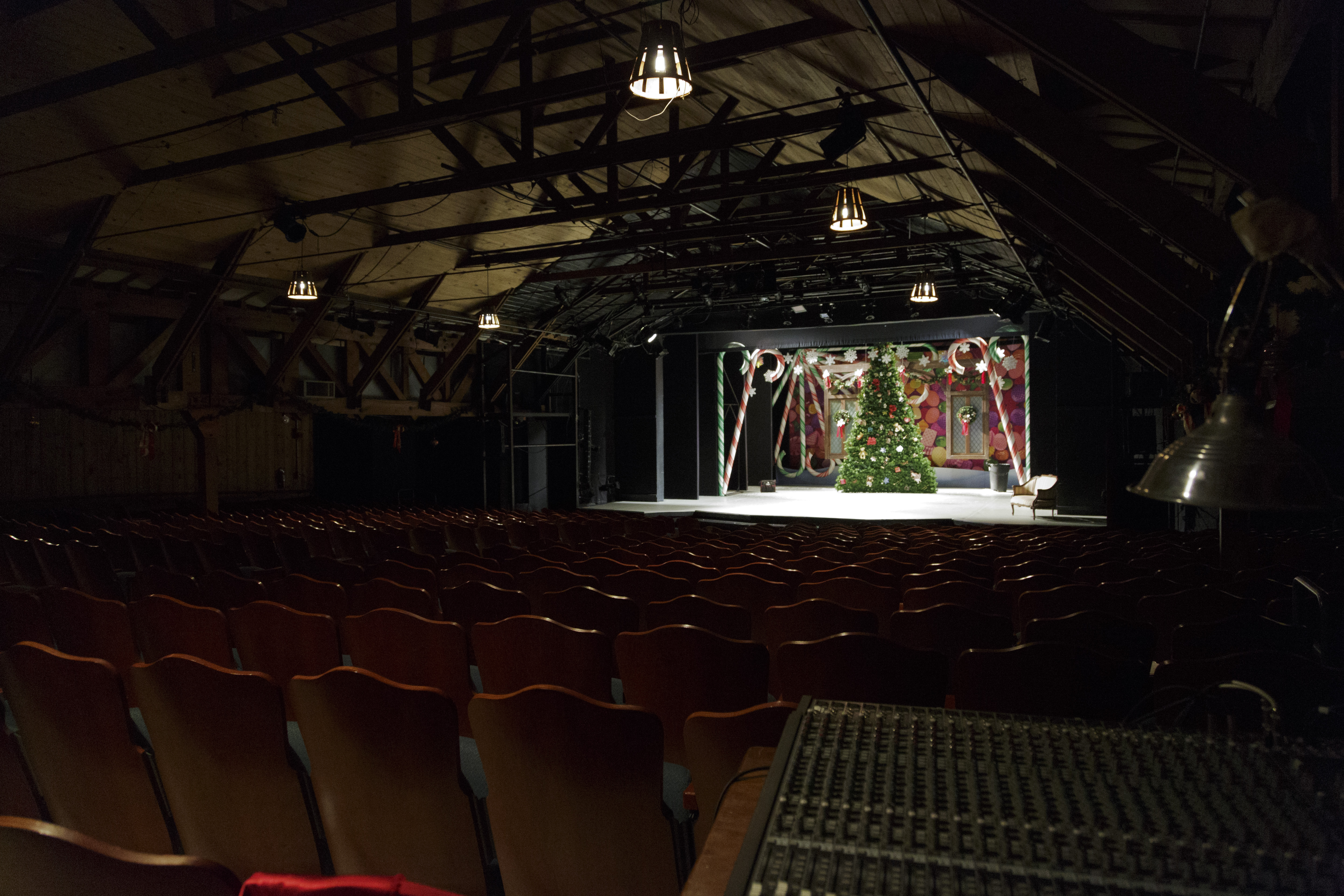
- Interior
- Founded: 1938; 88 years ago
- Tax ID no.: 52-1149571
- Legal status: 501(c)(3) nonprofit theater
- Purpose: 20th-century American classics and experimental plays
- Location: 2001 Olney-Sandy Spring Road, Olney, Maryland 20832, U.S.
- Coordinates: 39.1447623°N 77.0468944°W
- Services: Promotion and production of theatrical works, through the presentation of original, classical, and experimental plays in public and private theatres and auditoriums.
- Artistic Director: Jason Loewith
- Executive Director: Deborah Ellinghaus
- Chair, Board of Directors: Linda E. Rosenzweig
- Revenue: $7,541,789 (2017)
- Expenses: $6,125,750 (2017)
- Employees: 229 (2016)
- Volunteers: 330 (2016)
- Website: www.olneytheatre.org

Located in Olney, Maryland, the Olney Theatre Center is one of the two official state theaters of Maryland. Olney Theatre Center is situated on 14 acres (57,000 m^{2}) in the middle of the Washington–Baltimore–Frederick "triangle." There are three indoor venues: the Historic Theatre, the Roberts Mainstage, and the Mulitz-Gudelsky Theatre Lab. There is also an outdoor venue, the Root Family Stage at Omi's Pavilion.

The Roberts Mainstage seats 429 patrons, with a small theatre lab added in 1999.

As of November 2023, Olney Theatre Center has won 28 Helen Hayes Awards since the award's founding in 1985 and received 208 nominations. It is one of only two theaters in the country to operate under an Actors' Equity Association Council of Stock Theaters (COST) contract.

== History ==
In 1938, Olney Theatre was founded as a summer theater and restaurant by Stephen E. Cochran, attorney and judge Harold C. Smith, and theater manager Leonard B. McLaughlin. Olney Theatre was built on the Woodlawn Lodge estate, which was the site of a former roller skating rink in what was then rural Montgomery County. Olney Theatre is situated on unceded land that is the ancestral home of the Piscataway Conoy Tribe.

Stephen Cochran was the first managing director and actress Ethel Barrymore was the first associate director. The National Academy of Stage Training, a professional school of drama that had been founded by Cochran in 1932, moved to the Olney Theatre and began its first summer course there on June 20, 1938. The class was taught by Dorothy Martin and George Vivian.

Olney Theatre's first production, The Lady Has a Heart, had its first performance on July 25, 1938. The play was about a butler who was elected to the parliament of Hungary on a modified New Deal platform. The first show was sold out. Elissa Landi and Leslie Denison starred, along with Gordon Richards, Howard Ferguson, and Zoyla Talma. Olney Theatre had a rustic feel, with inverted peach baskets serving as chandeliers and an open-air lobby with an oak tree growing in it. Olney Theatre advertised itself as the South's first professional summer theater.

C. Y. Stephens, an owner of High's Dairy Stores, purchased property and remodeled it to become better suited for theater in 1940.

In 1946, Olney Theater was under the joint management of Glenn Taylor, Redge Allen, and Evelyn Freyman. It presented summer theater where shows featured well-known stars such as Jessica Tandy, Hume Cronyn, Tallulah Bankhead, and Helen Hayes. The theater was a five-show summer stock theater on the straw-hat circuit, along with 238 other theaters around the country.

Players, Inc. (subsequently known as the National Players) was Olney Theatre Center's touring company. It was created by Father Gilbert V. Hartke in 1949. It brought live theater and educational programming to students and public audiences across the United States and overseas.

In 1952, C.Y. Stephens invited Father Hartke to come to Olney for a meeting where he was asked to take over the theater. The two negotiated, and Father Hartke took over management of the property under his nonprofit touring company's umbrella. Stephens agreed not to charge Players, Inc. rent, and to reimburse them up to a $10,000 loss. Father Hartke then moved Players, Inc. to Olney to establish a summer theater.

After losses in 1953 and 1954, which Stephens underwrote, the decision was made to produce only five plays in 1955. Despite much critical success, Olney still sustained a loss of $3,495.61 in 1955. Consequently, Father Hartke asked William H. Graham Sr. to serve as Olney Theatre's general manager. His work, combined with the directorial talents of Robert Moore, Leo Brady, and Jim Waring drew large audiences, favorable reviews, and resulted in a profit of nearly $7,000 in 1956.

In 1960, after the production of Rashomon, directed by Robert Moore, Stephens told Father Hartke that he had decided to give him the theater. Stephens gradually transferred all of the property's stock to Players. Father Hartke became the corporation's president, a position he held for 33 years.

Governor Blair Lee recognized Olney Theatre as the official State Summer Theater of Maryland in July 1978.

Father Hartke died in 1986. The next year, Maryland State Arts Council designated Olney a "major arts organization", making it the only arts institution in the state outside of Baltimore to hold such status at the time. The theater was producing five three-week productions per season, primarily from May to September.

In 1991, Olney Theatre began a capital campaign to match a $625,000 state grant. The money was to be used for much needed improvements to the facilities and to realize Father Hartke's goal of operating year-round.

Olney Theatre added two shows to its 1993 season, and it began production in April and ending around late October. A scene shop and a costume shop were added to the mainstage building. Prior sets were built outside, and costumes were built on the Crawford House porch.

Jim Petosa was appointed artistic director of the newly renamed Olney Theatre Center in 1994. Petosa renewed emphasis on 20th-century American classics, musical theater, new works, and area premieres.

From 1998 to 1999, Olney Theatre Center celebrated the 50th consecutive touring year of National Players. During these 50 years, National Players had reached 2,400,000 audience members, traveled 1,760,000 miles (2,830,000 km), including ten tours outside the United States and five receptions at the White House, and gave over 6,000 performances. Olney Theatre Center began year-round performances with a seven-show mainstage season.

The Mulitz-Gudelsky Theatre Lab was built in 1999 as the first step towards a new master campus plan. A year later, Olney Theatre Center began a capital campaign for a $10.5 million expansion. In 2003, The Kresge Foundation awarded Olney Theatre Center a Special Opportunities Initiative grant of $1 million. The next year, Olney Theatre Center acquired an additional 5 acres (20,000 m^{2}) for its cultural campus. In 2005, Olney Theatre Center opened its new amphitheater, the Root Family Stage at Will's Place, which gave a permanent home to its Summer Shakespeare Festival. Olney Theatre Center held the grand opening of its Mainstage theater, a 429-seat facility with stadium seating and advanced technical capabilities. Olney Theatre Center expanded its mainstage season to eight plays and introduced its New Play Initiative with the world premiere of In the Mood in 2006. Olney Theatre Center also held its first Gala Celebration in over twenty years.

In 2007, Olney Theatre Center added a family entertainment series and formed Olney Theatre Institute, which reinforced its education initiative.

After 19 years with Olney Theatre, Petosa resigned as artistic director in 2012. Martin Platt was hired as the new artistic director. Platt resigned after six months. Jason Loewith became the new artistic director in 2013.

In 2016, Olney Theatre had a mortgage of $4.8 million, down from $6 million in 2013. The operating budget for the 2016 season was a little less than $6 million.

== Notable Productions ==
Since the theater was founded in 1938 it has produced many works that have gone on to later acclaim. Among them are:

=== Da (1973) ===
This memory play by Irish playwright Hugh Leonard was part of Olney's ongoing collaboration with him. Da had its world premiere at the Olney Theatre Center in 1973 under the direction of Jim Waring. The show later on ran on Broadway and received four Tony Awards, including the Tony Award for Best Play in 1978.

=== Joseph and the Amazing Technicolor Dreamcoat (1979) ===
Originally produced by Jim Waring for the Catholic University of America, producer Susan Rose saw the production at Olney and, along with Gail Berman, raised $150,000 to remount the show at Ford's Theatre in downtown Washington, D.C. The success of the show led to a Broadway production which received seven Tony Award nominations, including a nomination for Best Musical in 1982.

=== Ian McKellen's Playing Shakespeare (1987) ===
A solo show by the English actor Ian McKellen. This play was praised by the Washington Post. McKellen later helped to raise money for the 1938 Original Theatre's dressing rooms refurbishment.

=== Illegal Motion (1992) ===
John Riggins, a well-known former American football player, starred in this play and surprised fans from all over the country with his acting skills. The play, which was written by playwright Bernie DeLeo, world premiered at Olney Theater Center and ran for four weeks.

=== I and You (2014) ===
Written by Lauren Gunderson, I and You received its rolling world premiere at Olney. It later received a West End run in 2018 with Game of Thrones star Maisie Williams. The play was nominated for The Charles MacArthur Award for Outstanding Original New Play or Musical at the 2015 Helen Hayes Awards.

=== The Humans (2020) ===
Due to the COVID-19 pandemic, Olney Theater had to postpone all its current and upcoming in person productions at that time, and moved to online programing. One of the productions was The Humans by Stephen Karam. New York Times critic Jesse Green called the Zoom-produced video, "a blistering virtual production".

=== Beauty and the Beast (2021) ===
After the COVID-19 pandemic, Olney Theatre Center resumed in-person performances. Disney's Beauty and the Beast became a holiday production, the director of the production was Marsha Milgrom Dodge. This production was notable for casting the actress Jade Jones, a queer and a plus size actor, as Belle. The actor cast as the Beast, Evan Ruggiero, lost a leg to cancer. Tracy Lynn Olivera was nominated for the Outstanding Supporting Performer in a Musical Helen Hayes Award.

=== A.D. 16 (2022) ===
Following the success of Beauty and the Beast, Olney Theatre Center produced the world-premiere of the new musical A.D. 16. The book was by This Is Us writer and producer Bekah Brunstetter and the music and lyrics were written by Cinco Paul, who is known for his contributions to the Despicable Me franchise. The play was well received by the Washington Post. It won the Edgerton Foundation New Play Award and Outstanding Choreography in a Musical Helen Hayes Award.

=== The Music Man (2022) ===
The Meredith Willson production of The Music Man in Olney Theatre was well known for its unique performance in English with ASL and English supertitles which was an essential part of the experience for hearing audiences. The show was praised by The Washington Post, DC Theater Arts, MD Theatre Guide and Talkin' Broadway. The Music Man was nominated for nine Helen Hayes Awards, winning three, including a win for Outstanding Ensemble in a Musical.

The Helen Hayes Awards
	Year	Award name	Recipient Name	Production Name	Result
1.	1985	Outstanding Supporting Actress, Resident Production	BRIGID CLEARY	Enter a Free Man	Nominated
2.	1985	Outstanding Supporting Actress, Resident Production	PEGGY COSGRAVE	Crimes of the Heart	Nominated
3.	1985	Outstanding Supporting Actor, Resident Production	SCOTT HARLAN	Do Black Patent Leather Shoes Really Reflect Up?	Nominated
4.	1985	Outstanding Lead Actress, Resident Production	MARCIA GAY HARDEN	Crimes of the Heart	Nominated
5.	1985	Outstanding Lead Actor, Resident Production	TOM TONER	The Gin Game	Nominated
6.	1985	Outstanding Lead Actor, Resident Production	RICHARD BAUER	Enter a Free Man	Nominated
7.	1986	Outstanding Supporting Actress, Resident Production	BRIGID CLEARY	Miss Firecracker Contest	Nominated
8.	1986	Outstanding Supporting Actor, Resident Production	PATRICK RICHWOOD	The Foreigner	Won
9.	1986	Outstanding Resident Play	Foreigner	Foreigner	Nominated
10.	1986	Outstanding Resident Musical	Baby	Baby	Nominated
11.	1986	Outstanding Lead Actress, Resident Production	MARCIA GAY HARDEN	Miss Firecracker Contest	Nominated
12.	1986	Outstanding Costume Design, Resident Production	KATE CORBLEY	Miss Firecracker Contest	Nominated
13.	1986	Outstanding Actress, Resident Musical	LIZ LARSEN	Baby	Nominated
14.	1986	Outstanding Actor, Resident Musical	ROMAIN FRUGE	Baby	Won
15.	1987	Outstanding Performer, Resident Musical	KIRSTI CARNAHAN	Little Shop of Horrors	Nominated
16.	1987	Outstanding Resident Musical	Little Shop of Horrors	Little Shop of Horrors	Nominated
17.	1988	Outstanding Director, Resident Production	JOHN GOING	Noises Off	Nominated
18.	1988	Outstanding Resident Production	Noises Off	Noises Off	Nominated
19.	1989	Outstanding Lead Actor, Resident Musical	MARTIN VIDNOVIC	Side by Side by Sondheim	Nominated
20.	1989	Outstanding Lead Actress, Resident Musical	KAREN AKERS	Side by Side by Sondheim	Nominated
21.	1989	Outstanding Lead Actress, Resident Musical	KIM CRISWELL	Side by Side by Sondheim	Won
22.	1989	Outstanding Lead Actress, Resident Production	BRIGID CLEARY	House of Blue Leaves	Nominated
23.	1989	Outstanding Resident Musical	Side by Side by Sondheim	Side by Side by Sondheim	Nominated
24.	1989	Outstanding Supporting Actor, Resident Production	JOHN MICHAEL HIGGINS	The Butterfingers Angel	Nominated
25.	1990	Outstanding Costume Design, Resident Production	ROSEMARY PARDEE-HOLZ	Lucky Stiff	Nominated
26.	1990	Outstanding Director, Resident Production	JOHN GOING	Lucky Stiff	Nominated
27.	1990	Outstanding Lead Actor, Resident Musical	EVAN PAPPAS	Lucky Stiff	Won
28.	1990	Outstanding Lead Actor, Resident Production	RICHARD BAUER	Return of Herbert Bracewell	Nominated
29.	1990	Outstanding Lead Actress, Resident Musical	LORRAINE SERABIAN	Lucky Stiff	Nominated
30.	1990	Outstanding Lead Actress, Resident Musical	TIA SPEROS	Lucky Stiff	Nominated
31.	1990	Outstanding Resident Musical	Lucky Stiff	Lucky Stiff	Won
32.	1990	Outstanding Set Design, Resident Production	JAMES KRONZER	The Return of Herbert Bracewell	Won
33.	1991	Outstanding Set Design, Resident Production	RUSSELL METHENY	Secret Rapture	Nominated
34.	1991	Outstanding Supporting Actor, Resident Production	DAVID MARKS	You Can't Take It With You	Nominated
35.	1991	Outstanding Supporting Actor, Resident Production	LELAND ORSER	Secret Rapture	Nominated
36.	1991	Outstanding Supporting Actress, Resident Production	HALO WINES	You Can't Take It With You	Nominated
37.	1992	Outstanding Lead Actor, Resident Production	RICHARD BAUER	I'm Not Rappaport	Nominated
38.	1993	Outstanding Lighting Design, Resident Production	DANIEL MACLEAN WAGNER	Prelude to a Kiss	Nominated
39.	1993	Outstanding Set Design, Resident Production	JAMES KRONZER	Prelude to a Kiss	Nominated
40.	1993	Outstanding Supporting Actress, Resident Play	CAROLYN PASQUANTONIO	The Miracle Worker	Nominated
41.	1994	Outstanding Actor, Resident Musical	FLOYD KING	Show Me Where The Good Times Are	Nominated
42.	1994	Outstanding Actress, Resident Musical	ROBIN BAXTER	Show Me Where The Good Times Are	Nominated
43.	1994	Outstanding Actress, Resident Musical	LORRAINE SERABIAN	Show Me Where The Good Times Are	Won
44.	1994	Outstanding Costume Design, Resident Production	ROSEMARY PARDEE	Lend Me a Tenor	Nominated
45.	1994	Outstanding Lead Actor, Resident Play	KEN RUTA	Shadowlands	Nominated
46.	1994	Outstanding Resident Musical	Show Me Where the Good Times Are	Show Me Where the Good Times Are	Nominated
47.	1994	Outstanding Supporting Actor, Resident Play	JOHN NEVILLE-ANDREWS	Shadowlands	Nominated
48.	1995	Outstanding Lead Actor, Resident Musical	PEDRO PORRO	The Sweet Revenge of Luisa May	Nominated
49.	1995	Outstanding Lead Actress, Resident Musical	KAREN CULLIVER	The Sweet Revenge of Luisa May	Nominated
50.	1995	Outstanding Lead Actress, Resident Musical	BARBARA MCCULLOUGH	The Sweet Revenge of Luisa May	Nominated
51.	1995	Outstanding Set Design, Resident Production	JAMES KRONZER	The Night of the Iguana	Nominated
52.	1996	Outstanding Costume Design, Resident Production	ROSEMARY PARDEE	When We Are Married	Nominated
53.	1996	Outstanding Director, Resident Musical	JAMES A. PETOSA	Jaques Brel is Alive and Well and Living in Paris	Won
54.	1996	Outstanding Lighting Design, Resident Production	DANIEL MACLEAN WAGNER	The Passion of Dracula	Nominated
55.	1996	Outstanding Lighting Design, Resident Production	DANIEL MACLEAN WAGNER	A Streetcar Named Desire	Nominated
56.	1996	Outstanding Resident Musical	Jacques Brel Is Alive and Well and Living in Paris	Jacques Brel Is Alive and Well and Living in Paris	Nominated
57.	1996	Outstanding Set Design, Resident Production	JAMES KRONZER	A Streetcar Named Desire	Nominated
58.	1997	Outstanding Lead Actress, Resident Musical	ANITA HOLLANDER	The Fifth Season	Nominated
59.	1997	Outstanding Lighting Design, Resident Production	DANIEL MACLEAN WAGNER	Broken Glass	Won
60.	1997	Outstanding Set Design, Resident Production	JAMES KRONZER	Broken Glass	Nominated
61.	1998	Outstanding Costume Design, Resident Production	JULE EMERSON	Importance of Being Earnest	Nominated
62.	1998	Outstanding Supporting Actor, Resident Play	CHRISTOPHER LANE	Romeo & Juliet	Nominated
63.	1998	The Charles MacArthur Award for Outstanding New Play	CAROLE LEHAN	Look! We Have Come Through!	Nominated
64.	1998	The Charles MacArthur Award for Outstanding New Play	JAMES A. PETOSA	Look! We Have Come Through!	Nominated
65.	1999	Outstanding Costume Design, Resident Production	ROBIN STAPLEY	Camille	Nominated
66.	1999	Outstanding Lead Actress, Resident Play	HALO WINES	Holiday Memories	Nominated
67.	2000	Outstanding Supporting Actor, Resident Play	CHRISTOPHER LANE	Equus	Won
68.	2001	Outstanding Costume Design, Resident Production	HOWARD TVSI KAPLAN	Man of La Mancha	Nominated
69.	2001	Outstanding Lead Actor, Resident Play	CHRISTOPHER LANE	Thérèse Raquin	Nominated
70.	2001	Outstanding Lead Actress, Resident Play	VALERIE LEONARD	Thérèse Raquin	Nominated
71.	2001	Outstanding Lighting Design, Resident Production	DANIEL MACLEAN WAGNER	Thérèse Raquin	Nominated
72.	2002	Outstanding Lead Actress, Resident Musical	PEGGY YATES	She Loves Me	Nominated
73.	2002	Outstanding Lead Actress, Resident Play	KELLY MCANDREW	Holiday	Nominated
74.	2002	Outstanding Supporting Actor, Resident Play	DAVID MARKS	The Rivals	Nominated
75.	2002	Outstanding Supporting Actress, Resident Musical	SHERRI L. EDELEN	She Loves Me	Nominated
76.	2003	Outstanding Supporting Actress, Resident Play	SUSAN LYNSKEY	The Laramie Project	Nominated
77.	2004	Outstanding Supporting Actress, Resident Play	UZO ADUBA	Translations of Xhosa	Nominated
78.	2005	Outstanding Supporting Actress, Resident Musical	TRACY LYNN OLIVERA	Carousel	Nominated
79.	2006	Outstanding Lead Actress, Resident Play	CAROLYN PASQUANTONIO	The Miracle Worker	Nominated
80.	2006	Outstanding Lead Actress, Resident Play	MARYBETH WISE	The Miracle Worker	Nominated
81.	2006	Outstanding Lighting Design, Resident Production	CHARLIE MORRISON	Oliver!	Nominated
82.	2006	Outstanding Set Design, Resident Production	JAMES KRONZER	Oliver!	Nominated
83.	2007	Outstanding Lighting Design, Resident Production	CHARLIE MORRISON	The Elephant Man	Won
84.	2007	Outstanding Set Design, Resident Production	JAMES KRONZER	The Foreigner	Nominated
85.	2007	Outstanding Supporting Actor, Resident Play	JAMES SLAUGHTER	An Enemy of the People	Nominated
86.	2008	Outstanding Lead Actor, Resident Play	ARNIE BURTON	I Am My Own Wife	Nominated
87.	2008	Outstanding Set Design, Resident Production	MARIE ANNE CHIMENT	I Am My Own Wife	Nominated
88.	2009	Outstanding Lighting Design, Resident Production	CHARLIE MORRISON	Rabbit Hole	Nominated
89.	2009	Outstanding Supporting Actress, Resident Play	DEIDRA LAWAN STARNES	Doubt: A Parable	Nominated
90.	2009	The Canadian Embassy Award for Outstanding Ensemble, Resident Play	Rabbit Hole	Rabbit Hole	Nominated
91.	2011	Outstanding Lead Actor, Resident Musical	BOBBY SMITH	Annie	Nominated
92.	2011	Outstanding Lead Actress, Resident Musical	CARRIE A. JOHNSON	Annie	Nominated
93.	2011	Outstanding Resident Musical	Annie	Annie	Nominated
94.	2011	Outstanding Supporting Actor, Resident Musical	JAMES KONICEK	Annie	Nominated
95.	2011	Outstanding Supporting Actress, Resident Musical	JENNA SOKOLOWSKI	Annie	Nominated
96.	2012	Outstanding Ensemble, Resident Musical	Sound of Music	Sound of Music	Nominated
97.	2012	Outstanding Lead Actor, Resident Musical	ALAN WIGGINS	Joseph and the Amazing Technicolor Dreamcoat	Nominated
98.	2012	Outstanding Lead Actress, Resident Musical	JESSICA LAUREN BALL	The Sound of Music	Nominated
99.	2012	Outstanding Musical Direction, Resident Production	CHRISTOPHER YOUSTRA	Joseph and the Amazing Technicolor Dreamcoat	Nominated
100.	2012	Outstanding Resident Musical	The Sound of Music	The Sound of Music	Nominated
101.	2012	Outstanding Supporting Actor, Resident Musical	BOBBY SMITH	The Sound of Music	Nominated
102.	2012	Outstanding Supporting Actress, Resident Musical	TRACY LYNN OLIVERA	The Sound of Music	Nominated
103.	2013	Outstanding Lead Actor, Resident Musical	JAMES GARDINER	Little Shop of Horrors	Nominated
104.	2013	Outstanding Supporting Actor, Resident Musical	BOBBY SMITH	Little Shop of Horrors	Nominated
105.	2014	Outstanding Choreography, Resident Musical	TARA JEANNE VALLEE	The King and I	Nominated
106.	2014	Outstanding Ensemble, Resident Musical	A Chorus Line	A Chorus Line	Nominated
107.	2014	Outstanding Lead Actor, Resident Musical	BRYAN KNOWLTON	A Chorus Line	Nominated
108.	2014	Outstanding Lead Actress, Resident Musical	JESSICA VACCARO	A Chorus Line	Won
109.	2014	Outstanding Lead Actress, Visiting Production	ANDRUS NICHOLS	Bedlam's Saint Joan	Nominated
110.	2014	Outstanding Resident Musical	A Chorus Line	A Chorus Line	Won
111.	2014	Outstanding Supporting Actress, Resident Musical	JENNIFER CORDINER	A Chorus Line	Nominated
112.	2015	Outstanding Choreography in a Play HAYES	BEN CUNIS (FIGHT & MOVEMENT CHOREOGRAPHER), CHRISTOPHER D'AMBOISE (CHOREOGRAPHER)	Colossal	Won
113.	2015	Outstanding Director of a Musical HAYES	JASON LOEWITH	How to Succeed in Business Without Really Trying	Nominated
114.	2015	Outstanding Director of a Play HAYES	WILL DAVIS	Colossal	Won
115.	2015	Outstanding Ensemble in a Musical HAYES	How to Succeed in Business Without Really Trying	How to Succeed in Business Without Really Trying	Nominated
116.	2015	Outstanding Ensemble in a Play HAYES	Colossal	Colossal	Nominated
117.	2015	Outstanding Lead Actor in a Musical HAYES	SAM LUDWIG	How to Succeed in Business Without Really Trying	Won
118.	2015	Outstanding Lighting Design HAYES	COLIN K. BILLS	Colossal	Nominated
119.	2015	Outstanding Musical Direction HAYES	CHRISTOPHER YOUSTRA	How to Succeed in Business Without Really Trying	Nominated
120.	2015	Outstanding Musical HAYES	How to Succeed in Business Without Really Trying	How to Succeed in Business Without Really Trying	Nominated
121.	2015	Outstanding Play HAYES	Colossal	Colossal	Nominated
122.	2015	Outstanding Sound Design HAYES	CHRISTOPHER BAINE	Colossal	Won
123.	2015	Outstanding Supporting Actor in a Musical HAYES	GEORGE DVORSKY	How to Succeed in Business Without Really Trying	Nominated
124.	2015	Outstanding Supporting Actor in a Musical HAYES	LAWRENCE REDMOND	How to Succeed in Business Without Really Trying	Nominated
125.	2015	Outstanding Supporting Actress in a Musical HAYES	SHERRI L EDELEN	How to Succeed in Business Without Really Trying	Nominated
126.	2015	The Charles MacArthur Award for Outstanding Original New Play or Musical	ANDREW HINDERAKER	Colossal	Won
127.	2015	The Charles MacArthur Award for Outstanding Original New Play or Musical	LAUREN GUNDERSON	I And You	Nominated
128.	2015	The Robert Prosky Award for Outstanding Lead Actor in a Play HAYES	JOSEPH CARLSON	Colossal	Nominated
129.	2016	Outstanding Choreography in a Musical HAYES	TOMMY RAPLEY	Carousel	Nominated
130.	2016	Outstanding Choreography in a Musical HAYES	TARA JEANNE VALLEE	The Producers	Nominated
131.	2016	Outstanding Director of a Play HAYES	JEREMY COHEN	Bad Dog	Nominated
132.	2016	Outstanding Ensemble in a Play HAYES	Bad Dog	Bad Dog	Nominated
133.	2016	Outstanding Lead Actor in a Musical HAYES	MICHAEL DI LIBERTO	The Producers	Nominated
134.	2016	Outstanding Lead Actor in a Musical HAYES	TALLY SESSIONS	Carousel	Nominated
135.	2016	Outstanding Lead Actress in a Musical HAYES	JESSICA LAUREN BALL	Guys and Dolls	Nominated
136.	2016	Outstanding Lead Actress in a Musical HAYES	LAUREN WEINBERG	Guys and Dolls	Nominated
137.	2016	Outstanding Lead Actress in a Play HAYES	HOLLY TWYFORD	Bad Dog	Nominated
138.	2016	Outstanding Play HAYES	Bad Dog	Bad Dog	Nominated
139.	2016	Outstanding Supporting Actress in a Musical HAYES	DOREA SCHMIDT	Carousel	Nominated
140.	2016	Outstanding Supporting Actress in a Play HAYES	NAOMI JACOBSON	Bad Dog	Nominated
141.	2017	Outstanding Choreography, Musical HAYES	CHRISTOPHER D'AMBOISE	Evita	Nominated
142.	2017	Outstanding Choreography, Musical HAYES	SERGIO TRUJILLO	Carmen: An Afro-Cuban Jazz Musical	Nominated
143.	2017	Outstanding Direction, Musical HAYES	WILL DAVIS	Evita	Nominated
144.	2017	Outstanding Lead Actress in a Musical HAYES	CHRISTINA SAJOUS	Carmen: An Afro-Cuban Jazz Musical	Nominated
145.	2017	Outstanding Original Play or Musical Adaptation	MOISÉS KAUFMAN (BOOK & LYRICS), EDUARDO MACHADO (BOOK), ARTURO O'FARRILL (MUSIC)	Carmen: An Afro-Cuban Jazz Musical	Nominated
146.	2017	Outstanding Performer, Visiting Production	SHAWN PFAUTSCH	The Mikado	Nominated
147.	2017	Outstanding Visiting Production	The Mikado	The Mikado	Nominated
148.	2018	Charles MacArthur Award for Outstanding Original New Play or Musical	ANDREW HINDERAKER	The Magic Play	Nominated
149.	2018	Outstanding Choreography in a Musical HAYES	MARCOS SANTANA	In The Heights	Nominated
150.	2018	Outstanding Costume DesignHAYES	HELEN Q. HUANG	Fickle: A Fancy French Farce	Nominated
151.	2018	Outstanding Ensemble in a Musical HAYES	In The Heights	In The Heights	Nominated
152.	2018	Outstanding Lead Actor in a Musical HAYES	KEVIN MCALLISTER	Annie	Nominated
153.	2018	Outstanding Lead Actress in a Musical HAYES	RAYANNE GONZALES	In The Heights	Won
154.	2018	Outstanding Lead Actress in a Musical HAYES	BRITTANY CAMPBELL	My Fair Lady	Nominated
155.	2018	Outstanding Original Play or Musical Adaptation	MEG MIROSHNIK	Fickle: A Fancy French Farce	Nominated
156.	2018	Outstanding Production in a Musical HAYES	In The Heights	In The Heights	Won
157.	2018	Outstanding Supporting Actor in a Musical HAYES	MICHAEL J. MAINWARING	In The Heights	Nominated
158.	2018	Outstanding Supporting Actress in a Musical HAYES	VALERIE LEONARD	My Fair Lady	Nominated
159.	2019	James MacArthur Award for Outstanding Supporting Actor in a Play HAYES	SONG KIM	Aubergine	Nominated
160.	2019	Outstanding Choreography in a Musical HAYES	TARA JEANNE VALLEE	Elf the Musical	Nominated
161.	2019	Outstanding Choreography in a Musical HAYES	TARA JEANNE VALLEE	On The Town	Nominated
162.	2019	Outstanding Lead Actor in a Musical HAYES	DAVID SCHLUMPF	Elf the Musical	Nominated
163.	2019	Outstanding Lead Actress in a Musical HAYES	TRACY LYNN OLIVERA	On The Town	Nominated
164.	2019	Outstanding Lead Actress in a Play HAYES	JULIA COFFEY	Labour of Love	Nominated
165.	2019	Outstanding Visiting Production	H.M.S. Pinafore	H.M.S. Pinafore	Nominated
166.	2020	Outstanding Choreography in a Musical HAYES	KATIE SPELMAN	Cabaret	Nominated
167.	2020	Outstanding Choreography in a Musical HAYES	BYRON EASLEY	Roald Dahl's Matilda the Musical	Nominated
168.	2020	Outstanding Choreography in a Musical HAYES	GRADY MCLEOD BOWMAN	Singin' In The Rain	Nominated
169.	2020	Outstanding Choreography in a Play HAYES	PAIGE HERNANDEZ, CLIFF WILLIAMS III	The Royale	Nominated
170.	2020	Outstanding Costume Design HAYES	PEI LEE	Roald Dahl's Matilda the Musical	Nominated
171.	2020	Outstanding Direction in a Musical HAYES	ALAN PAUL	Cabaret	Nominated
172.	2020	Outstanding Ensemble in a Musical HAYES	Once	Once	Nominated
173.	2020	Outstanding Ensemble in a Play HAYES	Oil	Oil	Nominated
174.	2020	Outstanding Lead Performer in a Musical HAYES	MALINDA KATHLEEN REESE	Once	Won
175.	2020	Outstanding Lead Performer in a Musical HAYES	RHETT GUTER	Singin' In The Rain	Nominated
176.	2020	Outstanding Lead Performer in a Musical HAYES	MASON ALEXANDER PARK	Cabaret	Won
177.	2020	Outstanding Lead Performer in a Musical HAYES	GREGORY MAHEU	Once	Nominated
178.	2020	Outstanding Lead Performer in a Play HAYES	CATHERINE EATON	Oil	Nominated
179.	2020	Outstanding Lead Performer in a Play HAYES	JOHN TRACY EAGN	Ken Ludwig's A Comedy of Tenors	Nominated
180.	2020	Outstanding Lighting Design HAYES	COLIN K. BILLS	Cabaret	Nominated
181.	2020	Outstanding Musical Direction HAYES	CHRISTOPHER YOUSTRA	Cabaret	Nominated
182.	2020	Outstanding Production in a Musical HAYES	Cabaret	Cabaret	Nominated
183.	2020	Outstanding Production in a Musical HAYES	Once	Once	Nominated
184.	2020	Outstanding Production in a Play HAYES	Oil	Oil	Nominated
185.	2020	Outstanding Set Design HAYES	WILSON CHIN	Cabaret	Nominated
186.	2020	Outstanding Set Design HAYES	MILAGROS PONCE DE LEON (SET DESIGNER), CLINT ALLEN (PROJECTIONS/MEDIA DESIGNER)	Roald Dahl's Matilda the Musical	Nominated
187.	2020	Outstanding Sound Design HAYES	ROWE, MATT	Cabaret	Nominated
188.	2020	Outstanding Sound Design HAYES	KENNY NEAL	Oil	Nominated
189.	2020	Outstanding Sound Design HAYES	KENNY NEAL	The Royale	Won
190.	2020	Outstanding Supporting Performer in a Musical HAYES	DONNA MIGLIACCIO	Cabaret	Nominated
191.	2020	Outstanding Supporting Performer in a Musical HAYES	TRACY LYNN OLIVERA	Roald Dahl's Matilda the Musical	Nominated
192.	2020	Outstanding Supporting Performer in a Musical HAYES	JACOB SCOTT TISCHLER	Singin' In The Rain	Nominated
193.	2023	Charles MacArthur Award for Outstanding New Play or Musical	DANI STOLLER & AWA SAL SECKA	The Joy That Carries You	Won
194.	2023	Outstanding Choreography in a Musical HAYES	KATIE SPELMAN	A.D. 16	Won
195.	2023	Outstanding Direction in a Musical HAYES	SANDRA MAE FRANK & MICHAEL BARON	The Music Man	Won
196.	2023	Outstanding Direction in a Play HAYES	JASON LOEWITH & KEVIN MCALLISTER	The Joy That Carries You	Nominated
197.	2023	Outstanding Ensemble in a Musical HAYES	The Music Man	The Music Man	Won
198.	2023	Outstanding Ensemble in a Play HAYES	The Joy That Carries You	The Joy That Carries You	Nominated
199.	2023	Outstanding Lead Performer in a Musical HAYES	JAMES CAVERLY	The Music Man	Won
200.	2023	Outstanding Lead Performer in a Musical HAYES	ADELINA MITCHELL	The Music Man	Nominated
201.	2023	Outstanding Lead Performer in a Musical HAYES	VISHAL VAIDYA	The Music Man	Nominated
202.	2023	Outstanding Lighting Design HAYES	ALBERTO SEGARRA	The Joy That Carries You	Nominated
203.	2023	Outstanding Musical Direction HAYES	CHRISTOPHER YOUSTRA	The Music Man	Nominated
204.	2023	Outstanding Production in a Musical HAYES	The Music Man	The Music Man	Nominated
205.	2023	Outstanding Production in a Play HAYES	The Joy That Carries You	The Joy That Carries You	Nominated
206.	2023	Outstanding Supporting Performer in a MusicalHAYES	ANDREW MORRILL	The Music Man	Nominated
207.	2023	Outstanding Supporting Performer in a MusicalHAYES	NICKI RUNGE	The Music Man	Nominated
208.	2023	Outstanding Supporting Performer in a MusicalHAYES	TRACY LYNN OLIVERA	Beauty And The Beast	Nominated

== See also ==
- Helen Hayes Award
