= Lowell School (Washington, D.C.) =

Coordinates: 38.9852°N 77.0386°W

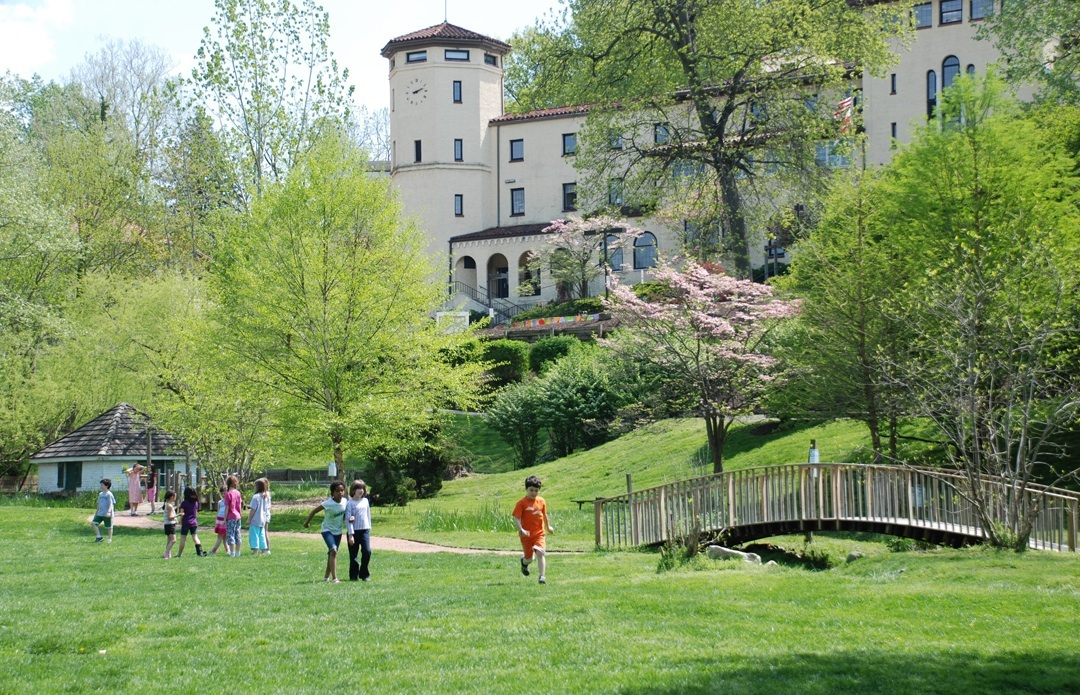
- Lowell students play on Lowell's 8-acre campus.
- 1640 Kalmia Road NW; Washington, DC 20012

Information
- School type: Independent; Progressive
- Established: 1965
- Head of School: Donna Lindner
- Grades: PS-8
- Enrollment: 340
- Student to teacher ratio: 6:1
- Colors: Green, grey
- Mascot: Leopard
- Publications: The Lead (Annual Magazine); The Lowell Loop (Weekly e-Newsletter)
- Website: https://www.lowellschool.org

Lowell School is an independent, diverse, co-educational preschool through 8th grade school located in the Colonial Village neighborhood near Shepherd Park Washington, D.C. The school was founded by Judith Grant and Susan Semple in 1965 during the Civil Rights Movement on the educational philosophies of Haim Ginott, Jean Piaget, Maria Montessori, John Dewey, and Friedrich Fröbel.

== School history ==
Lowell began as nursery school in the basement of Cleveland Park Congregational Church at 34th and Lowell Streets, N.W. The annual tuition was $325. Gail Shandler joined the staff in 1966 and went on to become the school's director in 1967. In 1975 the school added a kindergarten. Growing enrollment caused the school to move in 1978 to the Sixth Presbyterian Church on 16th and Kennedy Streets, N.W., making it one of the first independent schools to be located on the east side of Rock Creek Park.

In 1983, 1st grade was added. In 1984, in addition to adding 2nd grade, the Parents Association was formed and renamed the Lowell Parent Community in 1984. In 1985 Annual Giving was instituted to fund financial aid to improve financial accessibility. Lowell Primary School library opened in 1986 with 400 volumes, and today it holds 10,000 volumes. In 1987, Lowell expanded to 3rd grade. A year later, Abigail Wiebenson, formerly the head of the lower school at Georgetown Day School, became the third head of school. In 1989 Lowell purchased the Himmelfarb mansion at 16th and Decatur Streets, N.W. and moved into its own building in October of that year.

Lowell was accredited by the Association of Independent Maryland Schools in the 90s, and moved to its present campus on Kalmia and 16th Street NW and expanded to 5th grade. In 2001, the first 6th grade class was added. In 2007 Lowell appointed its fourth head of school, Debbie Gibbs, who had been the assistant head at Marin Country Day School in California. During Gibbs' tenure, Lowell expanded to include a middle school, adding 7th grade in 2011 and 8th grade in 2012. The Parkside Building renovation was complete in the fall of 2014, and currently houses the Middle School.

Debbie Gibbs announced her retirement in 2016.

In 2019, Donna Lindner, former lower school head at The Agnes Irwin School, joined Lowell as its fifth head of school.

== Campus ==
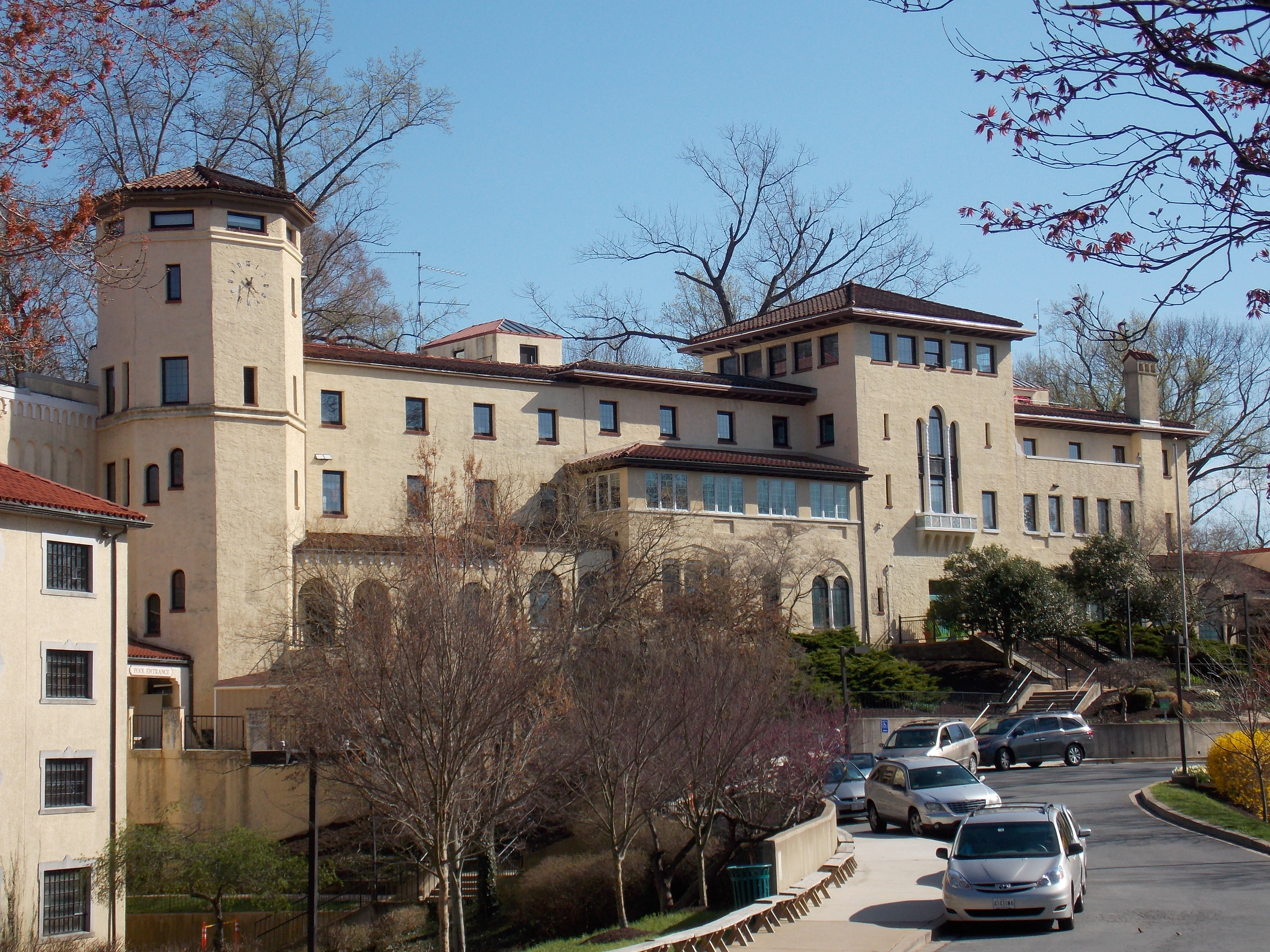
The Main Building, listed on the National Register of Historic Places as the Marjorie Webster Junior College Historic District.

Lowell School occupies a historic campus with three buildings, three playgrounds, two outdoor classrooms, an athletic field, a garden, a green roof, and Kalmia Creek. The Main Building contains Primary School classrooms, the Pre-Primary School rooms, a makerspace, rooftop science lab, the Primary School library and Pre-Primary Book Nook, a gym, a heated swimming pool, two art studios, and a dance studio.

Parkside, located along 17th Street NW and next to Rock Creek Park, holds Middle School classrooms, an engineering fabrication lab, a science lab, the Berkeley Library, two art studios, a makerspace, woodshop, and a black box theater. Marjorie Webster House, bordering Kalmia Road, houses various administrative offices, and a second creative woodshop. A fourth building (Frazier, a former dormitory) was razed in 2016.

There are three named spaces on campus including the Berkeley Library (named after a former Lowell student's grandmother who was eager to get children reading more.) in the Middle School, the Gail Shandler playground in front of the Pre-Primary entrance, and the Debbie Gibbs back playground.

=== Campus History ===
The 8-acre (32,000 m^{2}) campus bordering Rock Creek Park has a long history. Records show that the property was a working farm called Clouin Course in the 1840s. Its history still exists on the campus: a 150-year-old spring house with a small pond beside it. Today the 8 acres (32,000 m^{2}) and the Kalmia Creek, which the school daylighted soon after acquiring the property, are used as outdoor classrooms where students learn how to grow vegetables, and observe and care for the environment.

In 1928, the property became The Marjorie Webster School of Expression and Physical Education, which later became known as Marjorie Webster Junior College, a two-year, private junior college for women. The school operated until 1971. Six years later, the property was purchased by the United States Fire Administration to house the new National Fire Academy.

In 1978, while the property was still vacant, a more suitable location was found for the National Fire Academy and other elements of the U.S. Fire Administration. The property was subsequently transferred to Gallaudet University, which made it a satellite campus. In 1997, the property was acquired by Lowell School. The buildings were once again renovated, and the school moved in at the start of the 1999 school year.

The campus was listed on the National Register of Historic Places in 2014.

== Academics ==
The school-wide themes of community, diversity, and identity, ground the curriculum in the school's core values of insight, empathy, inclusivity, and equity. Each grade-level has specialized, integrated units focused on an essential theme.
