= Tracy Lynn Olivera =

American actress

- Occupation: Actress
- Spouse: Evan Casey
- Children: 1

Tracy Lynn Olivera is an American actress. As a jazz singer, she frequently performs with pianist Lenny Williams and her solo cd is entitled Because.

She is married to Evan Casey and together they have a son, Oscar Linus. She met Casey while performing in Allegro at the Signature Theatre. She studied at The Catholic University of America.
