= National Players =

American travelling theatrical company

The National Players is the longest-running classical touring company in the United States.

== Classical Touring Company ==
After 70 consecutive seasons of touring, this acting company has given approximately 6,600 performances and workshops on plays by Shakespeare, O'Neill, Molière, Shaw, Kafka, Sophocles, Aeschylus, Aristophanes, Stoppard and Peter Shaffer. Currently a program of Olney Theatre Center, National Players has performed for the public in 41 states, reaching young audiences in areas that are isolated geographically or economically – audiences that would otherwise never see live performances of classic plays. In response to invitations from the Department of Defense and the State Department, Players have toured Europe, Asia, and the Middle East performing for American military. During the Korean War, they made a six-week tour of Japan and Korea to entertain GIs, and have been to 5 White House receptions in appreciation for outstanding service.

=== History ===
National Players was founded in 1949 by Father Gilbert V. Hartke, OP, a prominent arts educator and head of the drama department at Catholic University of America. His mission was to stimulate young people's higher thinking skills and imaginations by presenting classical plays in accessible ways. A single twin-bill truck-and-station-wagon company, traveling under the banner of "Players, Incorporated," "University Players, " "Players," and finally "National Players," has continued to bring classic productions across the country from September to May.

=== How Players Works ===
A nationwide search of graduates of college and university theater programs leads to the casting of members of the touring company. In the tradition of traveling players, the troupe arrives a few hours before the scheduled performance to prepare the stage: raise the set, hang and focus the lights, check sound equipment and props, and arrange dressing rooms, before donning costumes and make-up. When the final curtain falls, they do everything in reverse.

=== Production History ===
The company went on hiatus during the COVID-19 Omicron wave and will remain so until at least 2026 due to improvements to the Olney Theatre Center campus.

Tour 70: Shakespeare's Twelfth Night, a stage adaptation of Jules Verne's Around the World in 80 Days, and Arthur Miller's The Crucible.

Tour 69: Shakespeare's Othello, a stage adaptation of Lewis Carroll's Alice in Wonderland, and an adaptation of F. Scott Fitzgerald's The Great Gatsby.

Tour 68: Shakespeare's Hamlet, a stage adaptation of John Steinbeck's The Grapes of Wrath, and an adaptation by Eric Coble of Lois Lowry's The Giver.

Tour 67: Shakespeare's A Midsummer Night's Dream and Julius Caesar; Benjamin Kingsland's adaptation of Charles Dickens' novel A Tale of Two Cities

Tour 66: Shakespeare's As You Like It and The Tempest; Christopher Sergel's adaptation of Harper Lee's novel To Kill a Mockingbird

Tour 65: Shakespeare's Macbeth and Comedy of Errors; an adaptation of Homer's Odyssey

=== Credits ===
The National Players have received accolades from Walter Kerr, drama critic emeritus of The New York Times; Patrick Hayes, founder and managing director of the Washington Performing Arts Society; and the late Helen Hayes. Players' alumni include John Heard, Laurence Luckinbill, Gino Conforti, John Slattery, Daniel Hugh Kelly, Stan Wojewodski (former Dean of the Yale School of Drama) and David Richards (drama critic for the New York Times). Most recently, National Players received special recognition from The Shakespeare Guild, presenter of The Golden Quill, the Sir John Gielgud Award for Excellence in the Dramatic Arts.
