= Gilbert V. Hartke =

American Dominican priest, theatre director, and playwright

The Reverend Gilbert V. Hartke OP

Personal life
- Born: January 16, 1907
- Died: February 21, 1986 (aged 79)

Religious life
- Religion: Christianity
- Order: Order of Preachers
- Church: Roman Catholic Church
- Ordination: 1936 (priesthood)

Gilbert V. Hartke OP (January 16, 1907 – February 21, 1986) was an American director, playwright, and priest of the Order of Preachers (Dominicans). He was founder of The Catholic University of America's Department of Speech and Drama, one of the first university drama programs in America. Hartke developed his curriculum during a time when drama was not considered a discipline in Catholic universities.

He directed over 60 major productions at CUA and several more for the National Players, a touring company he created. He secured the Olney Theatre, a summer stock playhouse in Olney, Maryland as a base for the Players. He invited his friend Helen Hayes and other notables to star in productions at Olney.

He wrote five plays, and toured his students on five continents and across the United States. He recruited playwright Leo Brady, director Alan Schneider and theatrical designer James Waring to the faculty. He also enlisted the assistance of Josephine McGarry Callan, a vocal coach, who was particularly noted for the excellence of the choral speaking she supervised in campus productions of Greek tragedy, and such plays as T.S. Eliot's Murder in the Cathedral.

Also known as the "show-biz priest", Hartke, a onetime college football player, was not a conventional Dominican friar. Still, he occupied a monk's cell in the Dominican House of Studies across the street from CUA, and often led students in praying the rosary at a little shrine in the entrance courtyard of the building housing the Speech and Drama Department. With his deep dramatic voice, athlete's frame, full head of silver hair, and often dressed in his white Dominican robes, Hartke was an arresting presence.

Well-known and highly regarded in social, business and political circles, he played an active role in the fight against racial discrimination in Washington, D.C., and served on the board of the revived Ford's Theatre. He was close friend and confidante to actors, politicians, and presidents.

In 1963, he was one of two Catholic priests (the other being Robert Paul Mohan) dispatched to the White House from the CUA to remain with the body of assassinated President John F. Kennedy until the official funeral, as requested by his widow.

In 1978, Princess Grace of Monaco visited the university to prepare for a poetry reading for the American Wildlife Fund. Geraldine Page and Rip Torn were among the many other artists who, at Hartke's request, came on campus to speak directly with students. His longtime friend Helen Hayes made her final stage appearance in CUA's on-campus Hartke Theatre, in Eugene O'Neill's classic Long Day's Journey into Night.

Hartke was also known for his creative generosity. When his students hit financial straits, he would first make sure they would work for their scholarships and loans and then he would go out and obtain them. Susan Sarandon worked in the university's business office. Jon Voight and Philip Bosco built stage scenery, and Henry Gibson worked as Hartke's chauffeur.

In October 1981, Hartke was named "one of the most powerful men in Washington, D.C." by the Washingtonian magazine. He had a major impact on Catholic theater, the many souls he touched personally, and the many more who benefitted from the blessings he brought to this world.

Today the theatre at Catholic University bears his name. Also an annual end of the year awards ceremony is named for him: The Gilbie Awards celebrates excellence in CUA theatre. In fact, these Tony-like awards are also shaped in his honor, resembling a robed friar.

Hartke and Catholic University were given one of Judy Garland's dresses from the movie The Wizard of Oz, which they were auctioning for the benefit of their drama school.

== Sources ==
- Mary Jo Santo Pietro: Father Hartke. His life and legacy to the American theater. Catholic University of America Press (2002).
