= Faten =

Faten is a given name of Arabic origin. Notable people with the name include:

== Given name ==
- Faten al Murr (born 1969), Lebanese academic and writer
- Faten Hamama (1932–2015), Egyptian producer and an acclaimed actress of film, television, and theatre
- Faten Mahmoud, Minister of State for Women's Affairs in the cabinet of Iraqi Prime Minister Nouri al-Maliki
- Faten Yahiaoui (born 1985), Tunisian team handball player
- Faten Zahran Mohammed (born 1955), Egyptian biochemist and environmental biologist, Cancer Biologist and Toxicologist

== See also ==
- Fadden (disambiguation)
- Faethon
- Faeton
- Fate
- Fatema
- Fatenah
- Fat Hen (disambiguation)
- Fatima (disambiguation)
- Fatine
- Fat Man (disambiguation)
- Patton (disambiguation)
- Vatten (disambiguation)
