= Folldal =

Folldal may refer to:

== Places ==
- Folldal Municipality, a municipality in Innlandet county, Norway
- Folldal (village), a village within Folldal Municipality in Innlandet county, Norway
- Folldal Church, a church located in Folldal Municipality in Innlandet county, Norway

== Other ==
- Folldal Gruver, a former mining site located in Folldal Municipality in Innlandet county, Norway
- Folldal IL, a sports club based in Folldal Municipality in Innlandet county, Norway
