= Greensleeves =

English folk song

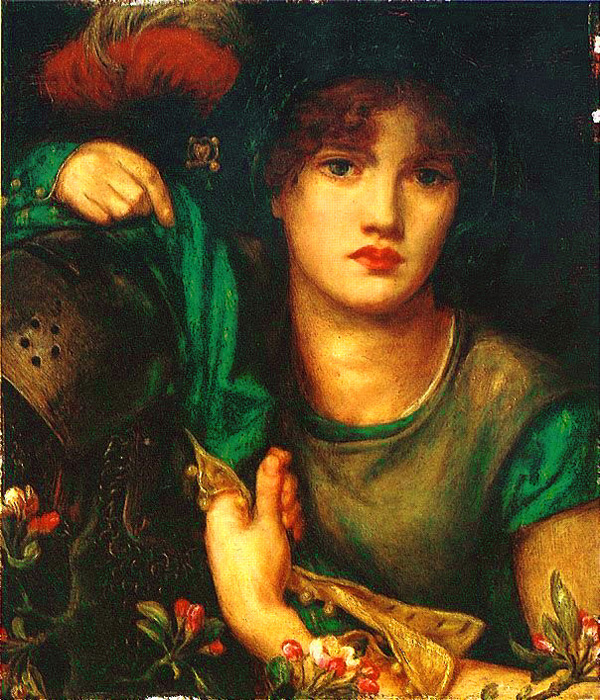
My Lady Greensleeves by Dante Gabriel Rossetti

Melody

"Greensleeves" is a traditional English folk song. A broadside ballad by the name "A Newe Northen Dittye of ye Ladye Greene Sleves" was registered by Richard Jones at the London Stationers' Company in September 1580, and the tune is found in several late 16th-century and early 17th-century sources, such as Ballet's MS Lute Book and Het Luitboek van Thysius, as well as various manuscripts preserved in the Seeley Historical Library in the University of Cambridge.

== Origin ==
A broadside ballad by this name was registered at the London Stationer's Company in September 1580, by Richard Jones, as "A Newe Northen Dittye of ye Ladye Greene Sleves". Six more ballads related to it followed in less than a year, one on the same day, 3 September 1580 ("Ye Ladie Greene Sleeves answere to Donkyn hir frende" by Edward White), then on 15 and 18 September (by Henry Carr and again by White), 14 December (Richard Jones again), 13 February 1581 (Wiliam Elderton), and August 1581 (White's third contribution, "Greene Sleeves is worne awaie, Yellow Sleeves Comme to decaie, Blacke Sleeves I holde in despite, But White Sleeves is my delighte"). It then appears in the surviving A Handful of Pleasant Delights (1584) as A New Courtly Sonnet of the Lady Green Sleeves. To the new tune of Green Sleeves.

It is a common myth that Greensleeves was written by King Henry VIII. However, Henry could not have written Greensleeves, as the piece is based on an Italian style of composition that did not reach England until after his death.

== Lyrical interpretation ==
A popular interpretation of the lyrics is that Lady Green Sleeves was a promiscuous young woman, perhaps even a prostitute. Historically, the word "green" had sexual connotations, most notably in the phrase "a green gown", a reference to the grass stains on a woman's dress from engaging in sexual intercourse outdoors. However, the earliest examples of associating green with fecundity date back only to 1675 (Shepherd’s Ingenuity: OR, The Praise of the Green Gown), and there are surviving Renaissance paintings of saints and noblewomen in green, casting doubt on the prostitute interpretation.

An alternative explanation is that Lady Green Sleeves was, through her costume, incorrectly assumed to be sexually promiscuous. Her "discourteous" rejection of the singer's advances supports the contention that she is not.

In Nevill Coghill's translation of The Canterbury Tales, he explains that "green [for Chaucer's age] was the colour of lightness in love. This is echoed in 'Greensleeves is my delight' and elsewhere."

=== Alternative lyrics ===
Christmas and New Year texts were associated with the tune from as early as 1686, and by the 19th century almost every printed collection of Christmas carols included some version of words and music together, most of them ending with the refrain "On Christmas Day in the morning". One of the most popular of these is "What Child Is This?", written in 1865 by William Chatterton Dix.

== Early literary references ==
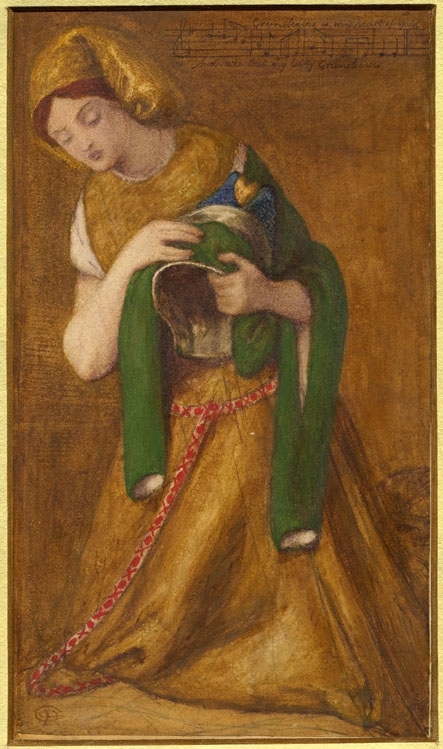
Dante Gabriel Rossetti – My Lady Greensleeves, sketch 1859

In Shakespeare's The Merry Wives of Windsor (written c. 1597; first published in 1602), the character Mistress Ford refers twice to "the tune of 'Greensleeves'", and Falstaff later exclaims:

Let the sky rain potatoes! Let it thunder to the tune of 'Greensleeves'!

== Form ==
The melody of "Greensleeves" is compatible with the chords in more than one of the ground bass chord progressions that were well-known at the time of its composition, including the romanesca, the passamezzo antico, and the Andalusian progression; the romanesca progression or the passamezzo antico progression can be repeated to fit the entire melody, but it is also possible to use the passamezzo antico in the verses and the romanesca in the refrain, or the Andalusian progression in the verses and either of the others in the refrain.

The romanesca originated in Spain. It is a sequence of four chords with a simple bass line; multiple repetitions of this type of harmonic progression can be the groundwork for melodic variations and improvisation.

== Uses ==
External audio
- You may hear Ralph Vaughan Williams' '"Fantasia on Greensleeves" performed by Leopold Stokowski and the New York Philharmonic in 1949 Hear on Archive.org

- The tune was used (as "My Lady Greensleeves") as the slow march of the London Trained Bands in the 16th and 17th centuries. Later the 7th (City of London) Battalion London Regiment, which claimed descent from the Yellow Regiment of London Trained Bands, adopted the tune as its quick march during World War I, replacing "Austria" (i.e. the Austrian imperial anthem) which had been used until then.
- Greensleeves is the tune for the classic Christmas carol "What Child Is This?".
- The 17th-century English ballad Old England Grown New is a version of "Greensleeves" that is also sometimes known as 'The Blacksmith' after another broadside ballad of the time.
- Green Sleeves to a Ground in The Division Flute, first published in 1706, is a set of 15 divisions based on the melody.
- Ralph Vaughan Williams incorporated Greensleeves into the song Alas, My Love, You Do Me Wrong for Mistress Ford in Act III of his 1928 opera Sir John in Love. (Its contrasting middle section is founded on another folk tune, Lovely Joan.) In 1934 the song was arranged by Ralph Greaves (1889–1966) for strings and harp, with Vaughan Williams's blessing; this is the familiar Fantasia on Greensleeves.
- Gustav Holst incorporated the tune into the final movement of his Second Suite in F for Military Band, interwoven with the primary theme, "Dargason". He later adapted the movement for strings, still using both folk tunes, in his St Paul's Suite.
- John Coltrane included Greensleeves on his 1961 album Africa/Brass, arranged by McCoy Tyner in a similar major/minor contrast as his popular "My Favorite Things".
- The tune was the basis for "Home in the Meadow", a recurring song throughout the 1962 epic film How the West Was Won.
- The song is traditionally played by ice cream vans in the United Kingdom, Australia, and New Zealand. It is also played by ice cream trucks in the United States, albeit rarely.
- Belgian singer Jacques Brel used the tune for the basis of his 1964 song "Amsterdam".
- Instrumental versions of "Greensleeves" were used in the long-running original Lassie television series, both in a seven-part 1966 story and as the show's theme song for its last three seasons (1970–1973).
- Canadian singer-songwriter Leonard Cohen includes an adaptation of the song, titled "Leaving Green Sleeves" in his 1974 album New Skin for the Old Ceremony, in which the chord progression and the lyrical content of the first two verses are retained.
- The melody of "Greensleeves" is used as a motif in SIX, a musical about the wives of Henry VIII.
- Elizabeth Goudge used the last verse and the chorus, twice, as songs sung by one of her characters in her historical novel Towers in the Mist (1938: Gerald Duckworth, London, Chapter 7 "Midsummer Eve"). Goudge's novel is set in 1565-1566, which makes her use of the lyrics a small anachronism.
- In Hong Kong, Ralph Vaughan Williams' "Fantasia on Greensleeves" is used as background music in the listening tests of the city's university entrance exams, the Hong Kong Diploma of Secondary Education Examination, and upon the opening of the MTR's Tuen Ma line in 2021, a video of a young rail enthusiast singing the lyrics "I'm really excited about the opening of Tuen Ma line" to the tune of "Greensleeves" became a viral internet meme. The MTR created its own edition of the song for the extension of the East Rail line in 2022.
- The tune has been covered by the London Vegetable Orchestra.
