= The Division Flute =

18th century music book

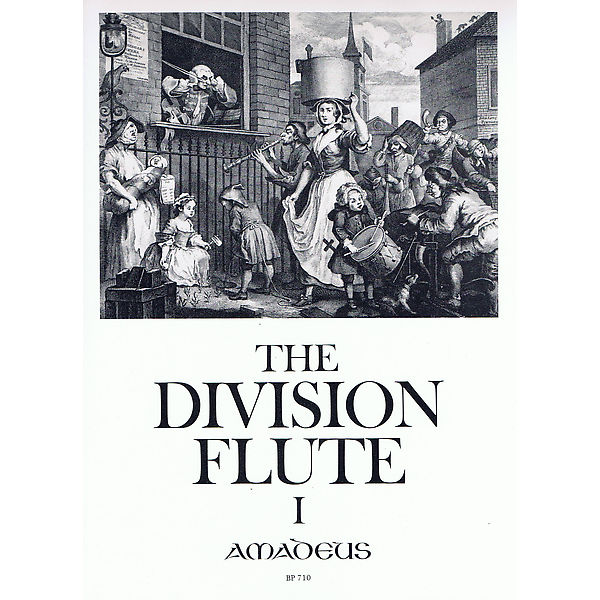
Cover of the Division Flute volume I, published by the Amadeus Verlag

The Division Flute is a collection of variations over ground basses and their melodies. The Division Flute was first published in 1706/1708 by John Walsh, senior and is based on The Division Violin by John Playford. Most of the grounds are anonymous folk songs taken from different styles like the French chaconne or the Italian Ostinato.

== Terminology ==
=== Division ===
The word "division" basically means variation and describes the ornamentation of the melody. In the 17th century, divisions became bravura pieces for virtuoso violinists in England. They would simply take a common folk song or other melody and improvise around it according to their abilities.

=== Ground bass ===
A ground bass is a type of ostinato, which is a melodic figure repeated over and over again in the same voice. The ground bass specifically is a melodic line or harmonic pattern repeated in the bass voice. The most famous example of this is Pachelbel's Canon.

== History ==
In the 17th century, music became more common for amateurs and non-professional musicians. With the elevation of music in people's everyday lives, the recorder, as an attractive, simple instrument to learn, became one of the most popular instruments. The Division Violin is a collection of the most famous of the divisions as would have been played by virtuoso violinists in England, published by John Playford in 1684. After the role of the recorder grew, the publisher John Walsh, senior, transcribed (or had someone else transcribe) some of the pieces for recorder and added his own selection of other divisions and published them in 1706/1708.

=== John Walsh ===
John Walsh, senior, was one of the most important music publishers and printers of his day. Born around 1665 in London, he was the musical instrument-maker-in-ordinary for King William III from 1692 onwards. He developed many new printing techniques and printed music for composers including Arcangelo Corelli and George Frideric Handel.

== Book 1 ==
Name	Form	Key	Background
Readings Ground	20 Divisions	F major	These were originally 50 variations for violin, written by the royal violinist Valentine Reading. John Walsh reduced them to 20 variations for recorder in this version. In the original, the ground bass varies in every variation but got replaced later by a single always repeating bass line, which mostly did not actually fit the melody.
Pauls Steeple	8 Divisions	G minor	This piece is probably the oldest in this collection, based on the style of its variations. The first variation is an old ballad melody from the 17th century, also known as The Duke of Norfolk.
Faronells Ground	11 Divisions	G minor	These are variations by the French violinist Michel Farinel on the popular "Folia" theme, which made him very famous in England. The melody line is very similar to the melody of Air des Hautbois Les Folies d'Espagne by Jean-Baptiste Lully. Variations 1, 2, 3 and 5 became also famous as the song Joy to Great Zesar. Farinel lived from 1649 until 1726 in La Tronche, France. He worked at the court of Versailles and was one of the most influential violinists of his time.
Old Simon the King	10½ Divisions	F major	The first two variations are based on an old ballad melody from the beginning of the 17th century. This piece and Johney Cock thy Beavor represent the style of folk music of that time.
Tollets Ground	22 Divisions	C major	These variations are based on the composition by the Irish fiddler Thomas Tollet and were later transcribed for recorder. The style of this piece is very close to folk music. These variations are also known as The Irish Ground.
Green Sleeves to a Ground	15 Divisions	D minor	This ground is based on one of the most famous songs of the 16th century and was used in many other textual and melodic variations. The well-known text to the song, included in variations 1 and 3, is: Alas my love, you do me wrong to cast me off discourteously; and I have loved you so long delighting in your company. Greensleeves was all my joy, Greensleeves was my delight, Greensleeves was my heart of gold, and who but you has Greensleeves?
Johney Cock thy Beavor	2 Divisions	C major	This piece is based on a Scottish Ballad melody and the variations show the influence of English folk music. The ground bass for this piece differs according to publication: in The Division Violin the bass is different for each variation, while in later editions the bass is the same throughout.
Division on a Ground (Bellamira)	16 Divisions	D minor	These variations were probably composed by Solomon Eccles who lived from 1618 to 1683 in England. He was initially a popular composer; later he became a Quaker and, in order to distance himself from church music, burned most of his compositions. This and A Division on a Ground by Mr. Eccles are some of his few pieces remaining. Its additional title Bellamira comes from John Hawkins's reference in his music history.
A Division on a Ground by Mr. Finger	9 Divisions	G minor	This piece was written by the theater composer Gottfried Finger, an influential Moravian Baroque composer. As well as many opera and theater compositions he wrote mainly for the viol and the recorder. This division is probably one of the few pieces in this collection originally composed for recorder.
A Division on a Ground by Mr. Eccles	8 Divisions	A minor	The form of this piece and the melody line of the recorder suggest that the piece was originally written for solo voice. It was probably taken from one of Eccles' numerous theater compositions.
A Division on a Ground by Mr. John Banister	17 Divisions	G major	Stylistic details suggest that this piece was not written by the royal conductor and organist John Banister, but by his son and namesake John Banister junior who was royal violinist. The ground bass does not fit all the variations so editors and players vary the bass line suitably.
A Division on a Ground by Mr. Banister	17 Divisions	F major	This piece was written by John Banister senior, the royal organist and conductor. He was the son of a waite at St. Giles-in-the-Fields and followed this tradition throughout his life. After first getting music instruction from his father, Charles II sent him to France for a professional education. After his return to England, Charles made him leader of his own musical band. Since the bass in this division does not fit with any of the variations the piece is mostly performed as a composition for recorder solo.

== Book 2 ==
Name	Form	Key	Background
A Ground by Mr. Finger	26 Divisions	F major	This piece was originally published in 1700 in the collection Dix Sonatas à I flute e I basse continue as Ciacona by Mr. Finger. Later Playford and Walsh took the piece and published it in The Division Violin and The Division Flute.
A Division to a Ground by Mr. Solomon Eccles	33 Divisions	B♭ Major	This piece is written to represent the variation technique of English folk music in the 17th century. The theme is a popular country dance, the Jigg.
A Division on a Ground	14 Divisions	F major	As with Readings Ground the ground bass does not fit the melody of the variations, so the bass line varies depending on the publisher or the interpreter.
A Ground by Mr. Solomon Eccles	39 Divisions	C major	In this piece, probably taken from one of Eccles' numerous theater compositions, he aimed to imitate the style of a French chaconne. The original version is a fourth lower than the version published by John Walsh.
A Division on a Ground	10 Divisions	F Major	The first half of the ground bass to these variations is based on the famous melody The Carmans Whistle. Since the piece is published in The Division Violin with the title Chacone by Mr. Finger it suggests that the recorder version is also based on Finger's composition.
An Italian Ground	10 Divisions	D minor	There are two versions of this piece; the other is included in The Delightful Companion, a recorder method book by Robert Carr and published by John Playford in 1686. The second version includes specific notation of all ornaments and trills and an accompaniment in the Italian continuo style.
A Chacone	through-composed	B♭ Major	This is a transcription of a chaconne for orchestra from the opera Phaëton by Jean-Baptiste Lully. The recorder plays the exact part of the first violin, while the ground bass is copied from the bass of the orchestra.
Chacone by Mr. Morgan	through-composed	G Major	This piece is also published in other collections but always as a solo improvisation without the ground bass.
Division by Mr. Hills	through-composed	C Major	This division represents the French style with its continuous dotted rhythm.
Division by Mr. Gorton	through-composed	C Major	
Prelude by Mr. Pepusch	AABB	G Major	This division is taken from one of Johann Christoph Pepusch's sonatas for recorder and basso continuo. It is written, unlike most other divisions, in the style of the baroque Dance Suite with its AABB form.
Prelude by Mr. Pepusch	AABB	F Major	This division is also taken from a recorder sonata by Pepusch and is in AABB form.
Prelude by Mr. Daniel Purcell	through-composed	F Major	This division is taken from one of Daniel Purcell's sonatas. He lived from 1664 to 1717 and was the younger cousin of Henry Purcell. His best-known pieces are his Magnificat and Nunc dimittis.
Prelude by Mr. Finger	through-composed	D minor	This is another of Gottfried Finger's pieces, taken from one of his recorder sonatas.
Cibell by Mr. Henry Purcell	AB	F Major	This piece is a mixture of the final choir of the first act of Lully's opera Atys and the imitation of this final choir by Purcell in his piece The new Sebel! for harpsichord.
Cibell by Signr. Baptist	through-composed	D minor	This piece is also an arrangement of Nous devons nous animer from Lully's opera Atys. The recorder switches between playing the first, the second, and the bass line of the original.
Cibell	through-composed	F major	
Cibell by Mr. King	AB	F major	Variations on the ground bass from John Hudgebut's Third Book of Theatre Music, published in London in 1699.
Cibell by Mr. King	through-composed	F major	
Cibell by Mr. O	through-composed	A minor	This is the same piece as the previous Cibell by Mr. King but in the original key. The prelude and interlude sections are also incorporated into the recorder part.
Cibell by Mr. Clark			
Cibell by my Ld. Byron			
Cibell by Mr. Clark			
