= Ragnhild A. Lothe =

Norwegian microbiologist and cancer researcher

Ragnhild Adelheid Lothe
- Born: August 23, 1958 (age 67); Bergen, Norway
- Education: University of Bergen; University of Oslo
- Known for: Research in cancer genetics and molecular oncology
- Awards: King Olav V's Prize for Cancer Research
- Scientific career
- Fields: Microbiology, Cancer research
- Institutions: Norwegian Radium Hospital; University of Oslo
- Thesis: (master's thesis in microbiology)

Ragnhild Adelheid Lothe (born 23 August 1958) is a Norwegian microbiologist and cancer researcher.

Lothe was born in Bergen, but grew up in Gjøvik. She studied mathematics, chemistry and biology at the University of Bergen and University of Oslo, graduating from the former with a master's thesis on microbiology written at the State Institute of Public Health. She took her PhD degree at the University of Oslo in 1992. She now resides at Frogner, Oslo.

Lothe heads a research department at the Norwegian Radium Hospital and is a "professor II" at the Department of Biosciences, University of Oslo.

Lothe has been leader of the Norwegian Cancer Society's research committee, chairperson of the Centre for Molecular Medicine Norway, member of the Norwegian Board of Forensic Medicine and editor of the journal Critical Reviews in Oncogenesis. She is a fellow of the Norwegian Academy of Science and Letters. In 2007 she was awarded the King Olav V's Prize for Cancer Research of the Norwegian Cancer Society.
