= King Olav V's Prize for Cancer Research =

The King Olav V's Prize for Cancer Research is a research award given annually by the Norwegian Cancer Society to a researcher who has distinguished himself through his scientific contributions to Norwegian cancer research. It was established in 1992.

== Recipients ==
Source: Norwegian Cancer Society (Norwegian)

- 1992 – Per Magne Ueland, Institute of Pharmacology of the University of Bergen.
- 1993 – Terje Espevik, Institute of Cancer Research and Molecular Medicine of the Norwegian University of Science and Technology (NTNU).
- 1994 – Anne-Lise Børresen-Dale, Department of Genetics, Rikshospitalet–Radiumhospitalet.
- 1995 – Stein-Ove Døskeland, Institute of Biomedicine of the University of Bergen.
- 1996 – Rune Blomhoff, Department of Nutrition, University of Oslo.
- 1997 – Sophie D. Fosså, Oncology Department, Rikshospitalet–Radiumhospitalet.
- 1998 – Kirsten Sandvig, Department of Biochemistry of the Rikshospitalet–Radiumhospitalet.
- 1999 – Per Eystein Lønning, Department of Cancer of Haukeland University Hospital.
- 2000 – Anders Waage, Institute for Cancer Research and Molecular Medicine of the NTNU.
- 2001 – Erling Seeberg, Microbiological Institute of the Rikshospitalet–Radiumhospitalet.
- 2002 – Eiliv Lund, Institute for Society Medicine of the University of Tromsø.
- 2003 – Sjur Olsnes, Department of Biochemistry of the Institute for Cancer Research of the Rikshospitalet–Radiumhospitalet.
- 2004 – Erlend B. Smeland, Department of Biochemistry of the Institute for Cancer Research of the Rikshospitalet–Radiumhospitalet.
- 2005 – Stein Kaasa, Institute of Cancer Research and Molecular Medicine, NTNU
- 2006 – Øystein Fodstad, Department for Tumour Biology of the Radiumhospitalet-Rikshospitalet
- 2007 – Ragnhild A. Lothe, Department for Cancer Prevention of the Institute for Cancer Research, Rikshospitalet-Radiumhospitalet
- 2008 – Hans Einar Krokan, Institute of Cancer Research and Molecular Medicine of NTNU
- 2009 – Lars A. Akslen, Gades Institute of the University of Bergen and Haukeland University
- 2010 – Lars Vatten, NTNU
- 2011 – Sverre Heim, Cytogenetic Cancer Section, Radiumhospitalet-Rikshospitalet
- 2012 – Claes Göran Tropé, Department of Gynecological Cancer, Oslo University, Radiumhospitalet-Rikshospitalet
- 2013 – Olav Dahl, Haukeland University Hospital
- 2014 – Harald Stenmark, University of Oslo
- 2015 – Rolf Bjerkvig, University of Bergen
- 2016 - Kjetil Taskén, University of Oslo
- 2017 - Per Ottar Seglen, University of Oslo
- 2018 - Vessela Kristensen, University of Oslo
- 2019 - Anne Simonsen; Norwegian Breast Cancer Group (NBCG) (two prizewinners)
- 2020 - Bjarne Bogen, University of Oslo
- 2021 - Bjørn Tore Gjertsen, University of Bergen

== See also ==
- List of medicine awards
- List of prizes named after people
