= McFadyen =

McFadyen may refer to:

- McFadyen (surname)
- McFadyen-Stevens reaction, chemical reaction

== See also ==
- McFadden (disambiguation)
- MacFadyen
