= McFayden =

McFayden is a surname. Notable people with the surname include:

- Brian McFayden (born 1976), American television personality
- Lincoln McFayden (born 2002), English footballer
- Kendell McFayden (born 1988), American soccer player and coach
- Mason McFayden (born 2004), American football player

== See also ==
- McFadden (surname)
