= Judge McFadden =

Judge McFadden may refer to:

- Christopher J. McFadden (born 1957), chief judge for the Georgia Court of Appeals
- Frank Hampton McFadden (1925–2020), judge of the United States District Court for the Northern District of Alabama
- Joseph J. McFadden (1916–1991), former chief justice of the Idaho Supreme Court
- Trevor N. McFadden (born 1978), district judge for the United States District Court for the District of Columbia

== See also ==
- McFadden (disambiguation)
