= Sjur Olsnes =

Norwegian biochemist

Sjur Olsnes (23 August 1939 – 18 July 2014) was a Norwegian biochemist.

He was born in Bergen, but grew up in Bruvik Municipality (now Vaksdal Municipality). He took his medicine degree at the University of Bonn, and worked at the University of Bergen from 1967 to 1968 before being hired at the Norwegian Radium Hospital. He took the Dr.med. degree at the University of Oslo in 1972 and was promoted to the post of professor in 1989. He retired in 2009.

He was a fellow of the Norwegian Academy of Science and Letters and the Russian Academy of Sciences. He was a prolific facilitator of Norwegian-Russian academic cooperation. Hans Wilhelm Steinfeld thus dubbed Olsnes a member of the "great Norwegian historical science troika in Russia" together with Fridtjof Nansen and Olaf Broch.

In 2003 he was awarded the King Olav V's Prize for Cancer Research of the Norwegian Cancer Society.
