= SS Clan Macfadyen =

SS Macfadyen is the name of the following ships of the Clan Line:

- SS Clan Macfadyen (1899), sold to Japan in 1921 and renamed Skunka Maru
- SS Clan Macfadyen (1923), sunk 27 November 1942 by U-508
- SS Clan Macfadyen (1944), sold to Greece in 1958 and renamed Betavista

== See also ==
- Macfadyen
