= Vatten =

Vatten may refer to:

- Vatten, Skye, a settlement near Harlosh on the island of Skye, Highland, Scotland
- "Vatten" (song), 1981 Swedish song
- Gunnar Vatten (1927–2011), Norwegian engineer and civil servant
- Lars Vatten (born 1952), Norwegian epidemiologist
