= Clement Robinson =

English ballad writer (fl. 1566–1584)

Clement Robinson (fl. 1566–1584) was an English writer and editor of songs and ballads. He edited and probably contributed to A Boke of very pleasaunte Sonettes, 1566 (not extant; reprinted, 1584, with title, A Handefull of pleasant Delites).

== Works ==
Clement Robinson prepared in 1566 A boke of very pleasaunte sonettes and storyes in myter, for the publication of which Richard Jones obtained a license in the same year. No copy of this work is extant, although Sidney Lee thinks a single leaf in the collection of Bagford Ballads in the British Library may possibly have belonged to one.

The book was reprinted in 1584 by the same publisher, Richard Jones, under the new title A Handefull of pleasant delites, containing sundrie new Sonets and delectable Histories in diuers kinds of Meeter. Newly diuised to the newest tunes that are now in use to be sung; euerie Sonet orderly pointed to his proper tune. With new additions of certain Songs to verie late deuised Notes, not commonly knowen, nor vsed heretofore. By Clement Robinson and diuers others. A unique imperfect copy of this edition, formerly in the Corser collection, is now in the British Library.

All the pieces were written for music; several of them had been entered in the Stationers' Register for separate publication between 1566 and 1582. In the case of eight the authors' names are appended. In Lee's view, the remaining twenty-five pieces, which are anonymous, "doubtless came for the most part from Robinson's own pen". Among these is the opening song, entitled "A Nosegay", to which Lee thinks Shakespeare may have been indebted for Ophelia's farewell remarks to Laertes in Hamlet, iv. 5. Another song in the collection, "A Sorrowfull Sonet", ascribed to George Mannington, is parodied at length in Eastward Ho (1603), by Chapman, Jonson, and Marston. The volume also contains "A new Courtly Sonet, of the Lady Greensleeues, to the new tune of Greensleeues".

By 1897, Robinson's Handefull had been thrice reprinted: in Park's Heliconia, 1815, vol. ii. ("carelessly edited", according to Lee); by the Spenser Society, edited by James Crossley in 1871 (Manchester, 8vo), and by Edward Arber in 1878, in his English Scholar's Library.

A unique tract in the Huth Library is also assigned to Robinson. The title runs: The true descripcion of the marueilous straunge Fishe whiche was taken on Thursday was sennight the xvj day of June this present month in the yeare of our Lord God MDLXIX. Finis quod C. R. London, by Thomas Colwell. This was entered on the Stationers' Registers early in 1569 as "a mounsterus fysshe which was taken at Ip[s]wyche".

== See also ==
- Greensleeves
