= Egnund Chapel =

Church in Innlandet, Norway

- Egnund kapell
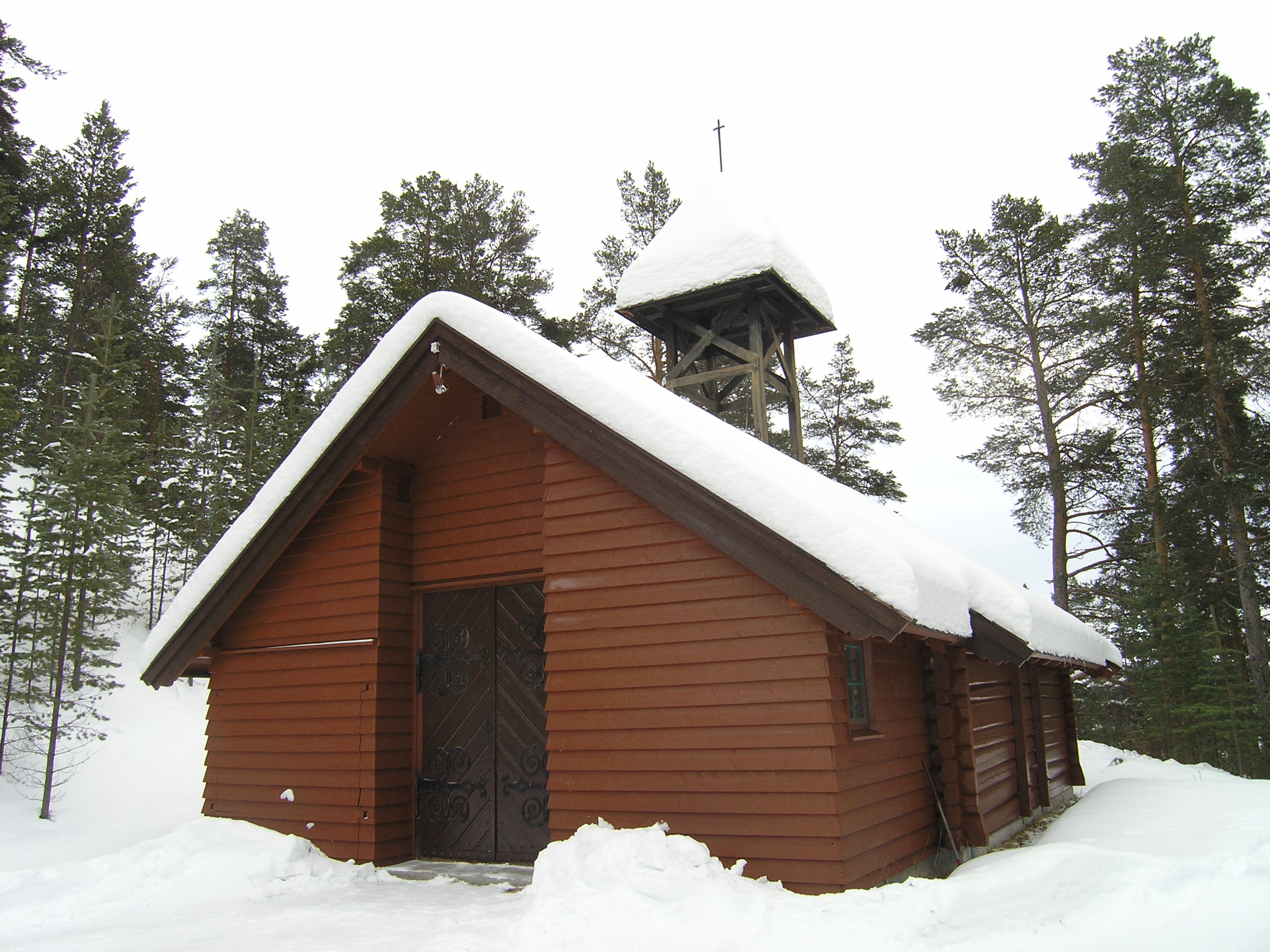
- View of the chapel
- Egnund Chapel
- 62°12′01″N 10°22′32″E
- Location: Folldal Municipality, Innlandet
- Country: Norway
- Denomination: Church of Norway
- Churchmanship: Evangelical Lutheran

History
- Status: Chapel
- Founded: 1975
- Consecrated: 1975

Architecture
- Functional status: Active
- Architect: Ingri Stein
- Architectural type: Rectangular
- Completed: 1975 (51 years ago)

Specifications
- Capacity: 60
- Materials: Wood

Administration
- Diocese: Hamar bispedømme
- Deanery: Nord-Østerdal prosti
- Parish: Folldal

Egnund Chapel (Norwegian: Egnund kapell) is a chapel of the Church of Norway in Folldal Municipality in Innlandet county, Norway. It is located in the village of Einabu. It is an annex chapel for the Folldal parish which is part of the Nord-Østerdal prosti (deanery) in the Diocese of Hamar. The brown, wooden chapel was built in a rectangular design in 1975 using plans drawn up by the architect Ingri Stein. The chapel seats about 60 people.

== History ==
In 1922, a new cemetery was constructed at Einabu to serve the people living in the area. During the 1970s, planning began for a new chapel to be built at the cemetery. Ingri Stein designed the small, rectangular log building. It was built and consecrated in 1975. It was built along the border of Folldal Municipality and Alvdal Municipality back in the time when the two municipalities formed a single church parish (they have since been split and each municipality is its own parish). The church was given as a gift to the two municipalities by Magne and Wilhelmine Louise Mortenson.

== See also ==
- List of churches in Hamar
