= Erling Brandsnes =

Norwegian politician (1945–2022)

- Born: 20 March 1945; Folldal, German-occupied Norway
- Died: 16 February 2022 (aged 76)
- Occupation: Politician

Erling Brandsnes (20 March 1945 – 16 February 2022) was a Norwegian politician for the Labour Party.

== Biography ==
Brandsnes was born in Folldal Municipality in the Reichskommissariat Norwegen, on 20 March 1945. He served as a deputy representative to the Norwegian Parliament from Hedmark during the terms 1993–1997 and 1997–2001. From 2000 to 2001 he was a regular representative, covering for Sylvia Brustad who was appointed to the first cabinet Stoltenberg. He was mayor of Folldal Municipality from 1987 to 1999. In the period 1983–1987 he was a member of Hedmark county council. Prior to being a full time politician, he worked as a teacher. Brandsnes died on 16 February 2022, at the age of 76.
