= Hans Einar Krokan =

Norwegian physician and cancer researcher

- Born: 18 February 1945 (age 81); Folldal Municipality, Norway
- Occupations: physician and cancer researcher
- Awards: King Olav V's Prize for Cancer Research (2008); Order of St Olav (2016)

Hans Einar Krokan (born 18 February 1945) is a Norwegian physician and cancer researcher.

He was born in Folldal Municipality. He graduated as dr.med. in 1977, and was appointed professor at the Norwegian University of Science and Technology from 1993. His research focused on DNA repair.

In 2008 he received the King Olav V's Prize for Cancer Research.

He was decorated Commander of the Order of St. Olav in 2016.
