= McFadyen (surname) =

- Pronunciation: /məkˈfædjən/

Origin
- Region of origin: Scottish

Other names
- Variant forms: McFadden, MacFadyen, McFayden, Mcfadyen

McFadyen is a Scottish patronymic surname meaning "son of little Patrick". The Gaelic prefix "Mc" means "son of", while "Fadyen" is a derivative of the Gaelic Pháidín, meaning "little Patrick". It is a variant of the surname McFadden. There are similar names including MacFadyen and McFayden. People with the surname include:

== List of persons with the surname ==
- Charles Hector McFadyen (1892–1965), Australian rules football player and senior public servant
- Don McFadyen (1907–1990), Canadian professional hockey left winger
- Hugh McFadyen (born 1967), Canadian lawyer and politician
- Ian McFadyen (born 1948), Australian writer, actor, and director
- John Edgar McFadyen (1870–1933), Scottish theologian and professor
- Ken McFadyen (1932–1998), Australian war artist
- Liane Buffie McFadyen, Colorado politician
- Luke McFadyen (born 1982), Australian rugby player
- Matthew Mcfadyen (born 1974), English actor
- Myra McFadyen (1956–2024), Scottish actress

== See also ==
- McFadden (surname)
- MacFadyen
