= Robert Broberg =

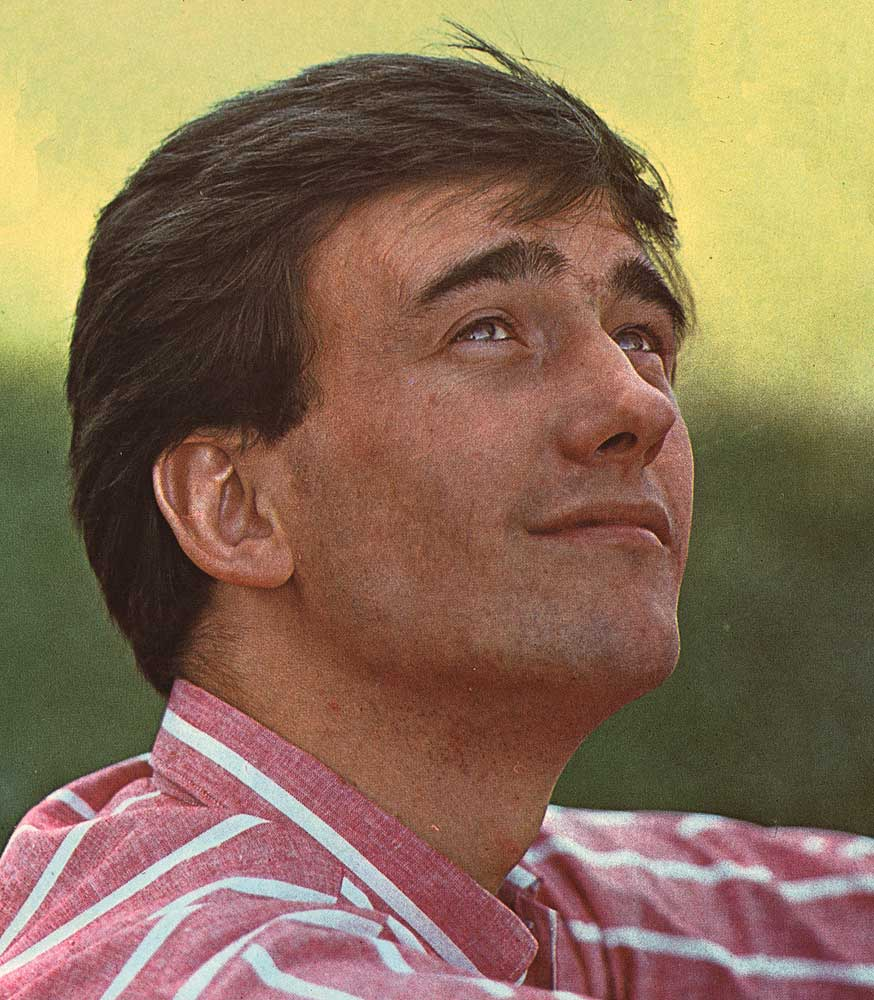
- On the cover of the LP 7 bitar Robban + 7 bitar Broberg (1967).

Background information
- Also known as: Robban Broberg, Zero
- Born: Robert Karl Oskar Broberg; 2 July 1940; Solna, Sweden
- Died: 21 July 2015 (aged 75) Stockholm, Sweden
- Genres: Rock, pop
- Occupations: Musician, singer, songwriter, artist
- Instruments: Vocals, guitar, harmonica, piano, drums
- Years active: 1960–2015
- Labels: Sonet, Triola, Capitol, EMI, Silence
- Website: robertbroberg.se

Robert Zero Karl Oskar Broberg (2 July 1940 – 21 July 2015), originally Robert Karl Oskar Broberg – born in the Råsunda district of Solna parish in Stockholm County, died in Gustav Vasa (district) parish in Stockholm – was a Swedish singer, comedian, artist, composer, musician and painter.

As an artist, he used various names: Robban or Robban Broberg (1957–1968), Robert Karl-Oskar Broberg (1968–1974), Zero (1974–1982) and, starting in 1982, Robert Broberg, the name he used until his death. However, "Robban" remained a nickname for the Swedish and wider Scandinavian public throughout Broberg's career.

== Early life ==
Broberg was the son of engineer Georg Broberg (1906–1995) and Valborg Lindgren (1909–1997). He went to Konstfack in 1957 and made up a story about having a skiffle group. In reality, he didn't have a band, but word spread and he was offered to play with his group at the dance restaurant Lorry in Sundbybergs. Then he quickly collected musician friends and they started rehearsing. Robban (as he was then known) eventually he started writing own songs. The desire and ability to play with words was there from the start, a talent that he developed further through his many humorous texts.

== Career ==
=== The 1960s ===
It was through Hylands hörna (lit. ‘’Hyland's Corner’’) on TV that Broberg really established himself. He got involved in a revue at Gröna Lund in 1965 where he had success with his own song "Koftan". His first major record success was "Maria-Therese", a song that reached first place on Svensktoppen in 1967. Broberg submitted the song to participate in Melodifestivalen, but was not selected. Instead, it became a big hit after his appearance on the TV program Önskeprogrammet från Cirkus. Then came a series of songs, both funny, burlesque, beautiful and romantic. Examples include "Det som göms i snö", "Jag måste hejda mig" and the breakthrough song "Båtlåt" (1967), which is about two boats that fall in love with each other.

In 1967, he and his much older colleague Julia Cæsar made acclaimed appearances on the radio program Thores trekvart, the same year he was the host of the radio. In 1968, he played the lead role in and wrote the music for the feature film Längta efter kärlek.

=== The 1970s ===
At this time, Broberg made several popular entertainment programs on TV, including Tjejjer, which was directed by Lasse Hallström, with a number of ironically hilarious songs about various female characters from Robban. The program was entered as a competition entry at the Montreux Comedy Festival in 1970. He made children's programs such as The Pling & Plong Show, where he appeared partly as himself, partly dressed as a robot.

Shortly thereafter, he broke with his image as a humorous and slightly crazy wordsmith, which had already made him one of the country's most appreciated younger artists. The tone became more serious and more questioning, and on the following albums, Broberg approached the progressive music movement with titles such as ‘’Vem är det som Bromsar & Vem är det som Skjuter På?’’. He made it clear that he did not want to be called Robban anymore and in the 1970s also appeared under the name Zero.

During the latter half of the 1970s, Broberg found himself at a dead end and considered quitting as an artist. In 1976, he left Sweden and settled in California and later New York for a few years. After a period of experimentation, he made a comeback with the successful one-man show Upp igen in Stockholm.

=== 1980s and later years ===
During the 1980s, a series of successful one-man shows followed at the Gröna Lund Theater in Stockholm, where Robert Broberg offered a wordy mix of music and stand-up. New songs such as "Vatten", "Killa mig på ryggen”, and "Spring inte så fort, pappa" became hits.

In 1989, he received the Povel Ramel Karamelodikt Scholarship. The same year, he appeared in the short film Godnatt, herr luffare!. In 1991, he did the anniversary show "Målarock" which, after a tour around the country, filled two performances at the Globen in Stockholm to capacity. During the 1990s, he did several successful shows that toured the country and ended at the Globen.

During the 2000s, his songs and stage shows increasingly became about life, aging and death.

For many years, Sveriges Radio had a whistle as a vignette between programs when it said "This is Sveriges Radio P3". Broberg was the one who made the whistle.

== Private life ==
Robert Broberg was first married from 1963 to 1975 to Eva Myhre (born 1937) from Norway and had two daughters (born 1963 and 1966 respectively) and a son (born 1972).

In a cohabitation in the 1980s with Anastasia von Zweigbergk (born 1956), granddaughter of Carl-Axel von Zweigbergk, he had a third daughter (born 1981). They also collaborated on some of Broberg's albums.

He was married for the second time from 1997 to 1999 to Eva Bolin (born 1959), who is the mother of his fourth daughter (born 1990).

In his last years, Robert Broberg withdrew from the limelight and publicity as his health deteriorated. He died from Parkinson's disease on 21 July 2015 at the age of 75.

== Discography ==
=== Albums ===
Date	Released as	Album Title	Record Label	Cat. No.	Format	Notes
1966	Robban Broberg	Helrobban Blandar Och Ger...	Columbia	SSX 1015	LP	Reissued by EMI in 1984 on CC, and 1998 on CD
1967	Robban Broberg	7 Bitar Robban + 7 Bitar Broberg	Columbia	SSX 1027	LP, Reel	Reissued by EMI in 1998 on CD
1968	Robban Broberg	Längta Efter Kärlek	Columbia	SSX 1039	LP	Reissued by EMI in 1999 on CD
1969	Robert Karl-Oskar "Robban" Broberg	Tjejjer	Columbia	SSX 1048 / 4E 062-34037	LP, 8T	Reissued by EMI in 1984 on CC, and 1999 on CD
Nov 1970	Robert Karl Oskar Broberg	The Pling & Plong Show	Pling & Plong	PLP-1	LP	Reissued by EMI on CD in 1999
1971	Robert Karl-Oskar Broberg	En Typiskt Rund Lp Med Hål I Mitten	Pling & Plong	PLP 2	LP, CC	Reissued by EMI on CD in 1999
1972	Robert Karl-Oskar Broberg	Jag Letar Efter Mej Själv	Pling & Plong	PLP 3	LP	Reissued by EMI on CD in 2000
1974	Robert Karl Oskar Broberg	Vem Är Det Som Bromsar & Vem Är Det Som Skjuter På & Vem Är Det Som Sitter I Baksätet Med Armarna I Kors Och Tittar På?	Rkob Ab	RKOB LP-1	LP	Reissued by EMI on CD in 2000
1978	Robert Broberg	Tolv Sånger På Amerikanska	Rkob Ab	RKOB LP 2	LP	Reissued by EMI on CD in 2000
Jul 1979	Robert Broberg Presenterar Zero	Motsättningar - Circle O Zero On Uma N.E.	H.K.F.T.A.T.K.	RKOB 3	LP	Reissued by EMI on CD in 2000
Feb 1981	Zero	Kvinna Eller Man	Silence	SRS 4667	LP	
Oct 1981	Zero	Am I Your New Toy	Silence	SRS 4673	LP	
1983	Robert Broberg	Upp Igen	H.K.F.T.A.T.K.	KAOS 4	LP, CC	Reissued on CD in 2000
1985	Robert Broberg	Raket	H.K.F.T.A.T.K.	KAOS 5	LP, CC	Reissued by EMI on CD in 2000
1987	Ree Pete & The Windshieldwipers	A Sunshine Story In The Pooring Rain	Mega Records	MRLP 3070	LP, CC	
1988	Robert Broberg	Morot / Raka Vägen Till Dig	H.K.F.T.A.T.K.	K8	LP	Reissued by EMI on CD in 2000
1989	Robert Broberg	Flygel Tur	Skivbolaget Nu	NU 90	LP, CC, CD	
1991	Robert Broberg	Robert Broberg's Höjdare	Robert Broberg Records	RBR 2	LP, CC, CD	Double album on 2 LPs
1993	Robert Broberg	Målarock	Robert Broberg Records	RBR-CD/MC 2	CC, CD	
1996	Robert Broberg	Dubbelsångare	Robert Broberg Records	RBR-CD 4	CD	
1999	Robert Broberg	Robert Brobergs Nya Universrum	Robert Broberg Records	RBR-CD 5	CD	
2001	Robert Broberg	Nära	Robert Broberg Records	RBR-CD 6	CD	
2004	Robert Broberg	Gilla Läget - Med Robert Broberg Live! På Turné 2003	Rob Art AB	Rob Art 0401	CD	Live album recorded in 2003
2011	Robert Broberg	På Cirkus Med Sitt 5-Manna Band	Nordisk Special Marketing	1031392	CD	Live album

=== Singles ===
Date	Released as	A-Side	B-Side	Label	Cat. No.	Album
1961	Robert Broberg	När Jag Står Vid En Bar	Rik Fin Karl	Sonet	T-7516	Non-album Singles
1962	Robert Broberg	Kromeo & Fulia	Sur I Bur Blues	Sonet	T-7527	Non-album Singles
Jan 1963	Robert Broberg	Franska Naturen	Knäppen	Triola	Td 175	Non-album Singles
1966	Robban	Hej Där, Lilla Rödluvan	Opopoppa	Columbia	DS 2326	Non-album Singles
Oct 1967	Robban Broberg	Väderleksfelprataren	Jag Måste Hejda Mej	Columbia	DS 2364	7 Bitar Robban + 7 Bitar Broberg
Nov 1967	Robban Broberg	Maria-Therese	Mej Händer Ingenting	Columbia	DS 2369	7 Bitar Robban + 7 Bitar Broberg
1968	Robban Broberg	Det Som Göms I Snö (Fling-Fling)	När Bilar Blir Kära (Tetatut)	Columbia	DS 2374	Non-album Singles
Apr 1968	Robban Broberg	Äntligen Min Älskling Äntligen!	I Ett Litet Litet Hus Ska Vi Bo! Robban, Eva, Ane Och Emma Broberg	Columbia	DS 2385	Non-album Singles
Oct 1968	Robban Broberg	Längta Efter Kärlek	Rimma Med Robban	Columbia	DS 2406	Längta Efter Kärlek
Oct 1968	Robban Broberg	Din Bild Gör Mej Vild	Alla Springer Omkring	Columbia	DS 2412	Längta Efter Kärlek
Jan 1969	Robban Broberg	Om Du Blott Blir Min	Dans Och Spel	Columbia	DS 2426	Längta Efter Kärlek
1969	Robert Karl-Oskar Broberg (Robban)	Ellen	Ingela	Columbia	4E 006-34070 M	Tjejjer
Oct 1969	Robert Karl-Oskar "Robban" Broberg	Carola	Mariga Mary	Columbia	DS 2458	Tjejjer
1970	Robert Karl-Oskar Broberg	Uppblåsbara Barbara	Elisabeth	Colombia	4E 006-34087 M	Tjejjer
1970	Råbet Kal-Åskar Brobärj – Robban	The Pling & Plong Song	Järnvägsövergångsång	Pling & Plong	P1	The Pling & Plong Show
1970	Robert Karl-Åskar Broberg	Gubbe Röd – Gubbe Grön	Huppegupptäcktsfärd	Pling & Plong	P2	The Pling & Plong Show
1971	Robert Karl-Oskar Broberg	Tågblås	Jag Drömde Jag Var Sitting Bull	Pling & Plong	P3	The Pling & Plong Show
1971	Robert KarlOskar Broberg	Good Morning!	1 – Hos Do You Feel-Mjölk Idag; 2 – Woulle Wou Mon Change E Vieux?	Pling & Plong	P4	En Typiskt Rund Lp Med Hål I Mitten
1971	Robert Karl-Oskar Broberg	Ingen BH Under Blusen – Kom Å Lek Me' Mej!	Verona	EMI	P5	En Typiskt Rund Lp Med Hål I Mitten
Jun 1979	Robert Broberg	I Wanna Be a Machine	I Love Things	Spartan	SPAR 1	Tolv Sånger På Amerikanska
1980	Zero	Tom Top	2942 Didn't I Tell You	Silence	ZING 111	Kvinna Eller Man
Aug 1980	Zero	Nothing's Gonna Stop Me Now	(I've Got A) Mistress Called Creativity	Metronome	J 27.195	Non-album Singles
1984	Robert Broberg	Beachparty	Det Står Skrivet I Sanden	H.K.F.T.A.T.K.	KAOS 5	Non-album Singles
1987	Robert Broberg	Killa Mej PÅ Ryggen !	Spring Inte Så Fort Pappa !	H.K.F.T.A.T.K.	KAOS 7	Morot: Raka Vägen Till Dej
1990	Robert Broberg	Jag Tror På Kärleken	Pling Plong Song	Robert Broberg Records [EMI]	RBR 1	Robert Broberg's Höjdare
1991	Robert Broberg	Ta På Dej Den Röda Jumpern, Baby	Hör Mina Lockrop!	Robert Broberg Records	RBR-S 2	Robert Broberg's Höjdare
1992	Robert Broberg	Galleri	Galleri	Rob Art AB	Rob Art Start	Målarock

=== EPs ===
Date	Released as	A-Side	B-Side	Label	Cat. No.	Album
1965	Robert Broberg	1 – När Du Går; 2 – Det Finns Bara Hon	1 – Höst, Vinter, Vår, Och, Sommar; 2 – Jag Behöver Dig	Triola	TEP 57	Non-album EPs
Mar 1967	Robban	1 – Hans Och Greta; 2 – Gummimadrassen	1 – Båtlåt; 2 – Dente Klokt = I'm A Nut	Columbia	SEGS 148	Non-album EPs
Oct 1967	Robban Broberg	1 – Maria-Therese; 2 – Bättre En Fågel I Handen	1 – Taxifiket; 2 – Medan Årstider Kommer Och Går	Columbia	SEGS 148	7 Bitar Robban + 7 Bitar Broberg

=== Compilations ===
Date	Title	Record Label	Cat. No.	Format	Notes
1966	Robert Sjunger Broberg	Music For Pleasure	MFP 5566	LP, CC	
1979	De 20 Mest Önskade Med Robert Broberg	EMI	7C 062-35689	LP, CC	Recorded 1961-1972 – Reissued in 1990 on CD, and 1992 on CC
1987	1962-72 / Collection	EMI	EMISP 132	LP	2 × LPs – Released as "Robban"
1994	Robert Broberg	Pickwick Music	751143	CD, CC	Recorded 1966-1969
1997	Robert Bro-berg & Dalbana - 57 År På Benen Varav 40 På Scenen	EMI	7243 823003 2 8	CD	4 × CDs
1997	Robert Bro-berg & Dalbana - Tredje Åket	EMI	724382300625	CD	
2000	Älskade Original	EMI	EMI-7243 -5260472	CD	
2001	Klassiker	EMI Svenska AB	CMCD 6272, 7243 5327352 1	CD	Recorded 1967-1999
2004	Diamanter	EMI	7243 5 96154 2 4	CD	2 × CDs – Recorded 1966-1972
2009	Text & Musik	EMI	50999 456822 2 3	CD	2 × CDs – Recorded 1969-2009
2012	5 CD Original Album Serien	EMI	50999 623639 2 1	CD	5 × CDs – Boxset of albums recorded 1967-1972

- 2015: Text & Musik

=== Songs written ===
(Selective)

- Carola
- Ingela
- Uppblåsbara Barbara
- Likbil
- Båtlåt
- Öken
- Maria-Therese
- 1983 års ängel
- Lajla 1
- Vatten
- Alla springer omkring
- Sitting Bull
- Om kärleken var statsminister
- Pappa se min hand
- Vinna med min kvinna
- Får jag doppa min mjukglass i din strössel

== Videography ==
Date	Title	Label	Cat. No.	Format	Notes
2010	På Globen Med Höjdare Och Målarock	Universal Studios	SSD8276900	DVD	3 DVDs – 1969 to 1996
2011	På Cirkus Med Sitt 5-Manna Band	Nordisk Special Marketing	2003631	DVD	Recorded in 2010
2012	The Pling & Plong Show	Nordisk Special Marketing	2078431	DVD	Recorded in 1970

== Bibliography ==
- Dej ska vi lura... (1968)
- Robert Brobergs galleri finns de' inga galler i (1992)
- Gilla läget! (2003)

== Filmography ==
- 1965: 4 x 4 – Frank Citter
- 1968: Längta efter kärlek – Bosse
- 1981: Kom igen nu'rå! (TV Short) – Pelle
- 1982: Kan tigrar få ägg? (TV Short) – Totte
- 1987: Ree Pete and the Windshieldwipers (TV Movie) – Ree Pete
- 1988: Go'natt Herr Luffare (Short) – Pappa (final film role)
