= Sverre Heim =

Norwegian physician and cancer researcher

- Born: 4 October 1951 (age 74); Balsfjord, Norway
- Occupations: physician and cancer researcher
- Awards: King Olav V's Prize for Cancer Research (2011)

Sverre Heim (born 4 October 1951) is a Norwegian physician and cancer researcher. He is leader of the Cytogenetic Cancer Section at the Norwegian Radium Hospital. His research has focused on chromosome abnormality and cancer. In 2011 he received the King Olav V's Prize for Cancer Research.

Heim is an able chess player and won the Norwegian Chess Championship in 1980. His peak rating was 2430 in January 1981. He was awarded the FIDE Master title in 1985.
