= McFadden (surname) =

McFadden / MacFadden
- Pronunciation: /məkˈfædən/

Origin
- Origin: Celtic
- Region of origin: Scotland/Ireland

Other names
- Variant forms: McFayden, MacFayden

McFadden, a name originating in Kintyre, Scotland, is foremost a Scottish and secondly an Irish patronymic surname due to emigration from Scotland to Ireland. The meaning of McFadden is "son of little Patrick," named after St. Patrick, Ireland's patron saint. The Celtic prefix "Mac, Mc or M’" means "son of", while "Fadden" is derived from the Gaelic Páidín, meaning "little Patrick". There are variant spellings, including McFaddin, MacFadden, Mac Phaidin, McFadin, McFadyen, McFadhen, MacFadyen, McFadwyn, McFadyean, MacFadzean, McFadyon, McFayden, Fadden, Fadyen, Faden, Fadin, and Fadwyn. McFadden is uncommon as a given name. People with the surname include:

- Andrew McFadden, Australian rugby league football coach
- Bernarr Macfadden (1868–1955), American proponent of physical culture
- Bob McFadden (1923‒2000), American singer, impressionist, and voice-over actor
- Brian McFadden (born 1980), Irish singer
- Bryant McFadden (born 1981), American football player
- Callum McFadden, Bassist with the band Hooton Tennis Club
- Charlie "Specks" McFadden (1895–1966), American country blues singer and songwriter
- Claron McFadden, American soprano
- Cynthia McFadden, correspondent for the American Broadcasting Company
- Cyra McFadden, American writer
- Daniel McFadden (born 1937), economist, Nobel laureate
- Darren McFadden, American football player
- David McFadden, Canadian poet
- David Henry McFadden, Canadian politician from Manitoba
- David James McFadden, Canadian politician from Ontario
- Edgar McFadden, American farmer and plant breeder
- Eric McFadden, American musician
- Freida McFadden, American thriller author
- Gabrielle McFadden, Irish politician
- Gates McFadden (born 1949), American actor and choreographer
- Gene McFadden (1949–2006), American singer and songwriter
- Henry McFadden (1798–1875), American farmer and politician from New York
- Hugh McFadden (poet) (born 1942), Irish poet, critic, literary editor, journalist
- Hugh McFadden (Gaelic footballer), Irish Gaelic footballer
- Hamilton MacFadden (1901–1977), American actor
- Ike McFadden (born 1977), American film producer
- James McFadden (born 1983), Scottish footballer
- Jerry Walter McFadden (1948–1999), American serial killer and sex offender
- Jesse McFadden, American sex offender
- Jim McFadden, hockey player
- Johnjoe McFadden, Irish academic
- Joe McFadden, Scottish actor
- Jordan McFadden (born 1999), American football player
- Joseph P. McFadden (1947–2013), American Roman Catholic bishop
- Ken McFadden, American basketball player
- Kenny McFadden, American basketball player who played and coaches in New Zealand
- Louis Thomas McFadden, member of the U.S. House of Representatives
- Lucy-Ann McFadden (born 1952), American astronomer.
- Margaret Bischell McFadden, American philanthropist and social worker
- Mark McFadden, television news journalist
- Mary McFadden, American fashion designer
- Micah McFadden (born 2000), American football player
- Nathaniel J. McFadden (born 1946), American politician from Maryland
- Nicky McFadden, Irish politician
- Pat McFadden (British politician), British politician, member of Parliament
- Patrick McFadden, Irish politician
- Patricia McFadden, Swazi radical feminist
- Paul McFadden (footballer), Scottish footballer
- Reece McFadden, Scottish boxer
- Steve McFadden, English actor
- Susan McFadden, Irish singer and actress
- Tarvarus McFadden (born 1997), American football player
- Tatyana McFadden (born 1989), American Paralympian athlete
- Trevor N. McFadden, U.S. District Court judge
- W. H. McFadden, American oil executive

== See also ==
- Fadden (disambiguation)
- McFadyen (disambiguation)
- MacFadyen
