= I'm really excited about the opening of the Tuen Ma line =

2021 viral meme in Hong Kong

"I'm really excited about the opening of the Tuen Ma line" (Chinese: 屯馬開通真的很興奮) was a viral meme in Hong Kong, originating in June 2021 from a news interview of a train enthusiast during the full-length opening of Tuen Ma line, a railway line in the city's Mass Transit Railway (MTR) system. The interviewee, 16-year-old Jason Law, was asked about his thoughts on the line's opening, and responded by singing the phrase to the tune of the English folk song Greensleeves. The song is best known in Hong Kong as the background music for the listening tests of the city's university entrance exams.

The phrase became an internet sensation within days of the interview being uploaded to YouTube. It was parodied and adapted into multiple forms in the format of "I'm really excited" (真的很興奮), including by singers, actors, and content creators. Law also made further appearances in the media due to the phrase's popularity, and was invited by the MTR to sing a variation of the phrase for the opening of the East Rail line's cross-harbour extension. The meme was largely received positively, though Law reported being doxxed and harassed by some for his interest in the MTR, due to its alleged collusion with government authorities during the 2019–2020 Hong Kong protests.

== Background ==
The Tuen Ma line is part of the Mass Transit Railway (MTR), a major public transport network in Hong Kong. The line was formed from merging the former Ma On Shan and West Rail railway lines, and opened in two separate phases. The first phase was opened on 14 February 2020, extending the Ma On Shan line from Tai Wai to Kai Tak. The second phase integrated the West Rail line by connecting Kai Tak to Hung Hom, and opened on 27 June 2021.

== Origin ==
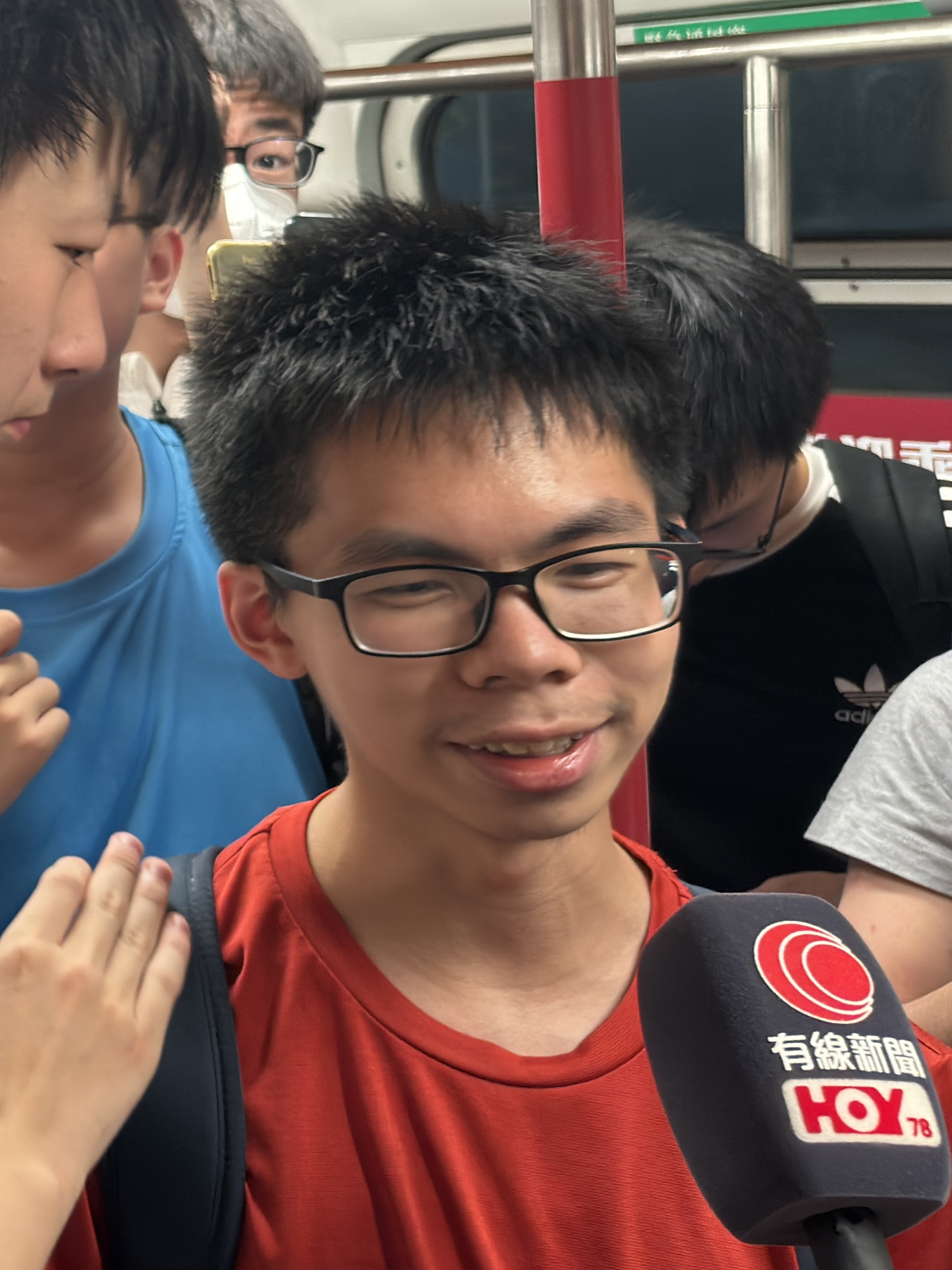
Jason Law in 2024

On 27 June 2021, during the full-length opening of Tuen Ma line, 16-year-old Jason Law (羅哲琛) and hundreds of other train enthusiasts waited at Sung Wong Toi station for the line's opening. Law was interviewed by local broadcaster TVB News, and said, "This is a song lyric I thought of, 'I'm really excited about the opening of the Tuen Ma line,' something like this that can describe my feelings right now."

The part "I'm really excited about the opening of the Tuen Ma line" was sung to the tune of Greensleeves, an English folk song used as the background music for the listening tests of the Hong Kong Diploma of Secondary Education Examination, the city's university entrance exams. Law later explained that he had then recently finished a listening examination at school and that the tune of Greensleeves was stuck in his head.

== Popularity ==
Shortly after Law's interview, a video clip of it was uploaded to YouTube, and reached 66,000 views within one night. The song was parodied by content creators and musicians, including by Stanley Yau of Cantopop boy group Mirror. A parody video in which Law was depicted singing the phrase repeatedly reached more than 85,000 views within 24 hours, and was described by local news organisation HK01 as "an earworm and easy to sing". Law also expressed appreciation towards the parody video, commenting "I like it very much".

The interview segment started a trend where people would imitate the phrase. In a Facebook post, Kowloon Motor Bus (KMB) remarked that "I am really excited to ride the KMB". In one viral video, staff of the supermarket chain Don Don Donki were seen singing "I am really excited to come to [Don Don] Donki". Hong Kong actor Chapman To also engaged in the trend, singing the phrase and also adding a few of his own lines.

Around a year after the initial interview, Law was invited by the MTR to appear in a music video celebrating the opening of the East Rail line's cross-harbour extension to Admiralty station. The video was titled "I am very excited about the East Rail line crossing the sea" (東鐵過海真的很興奮), and was posted on the MTR's Facebook and YouTube pages on 12 May 2022, three days before the opening. Law later thanked netizens for the positive reception, saying that "it was [his] honour to bring everyone joy". He also sang his segment in person with MTR officials on the extension's opening day.

== Impact on Law ==
In an interview with the South China Morning Post's youth newspaper in July 2021, Law talked about how his interest in trains is connected to his autism, and that he had been producing YouTube videos about the MTR for many years hoping to bring joy to other people. While Law's phrase received mostly positive attention, he revealed that he was doxxed following the meme's virality, with his phone number being posted online and called by strangers. Some netizens disapproved of his interest in trains on political grounds, as the MTR is alleged to have shut down train stations during the 2019–2020 Hong Kong protests to prevent protesters from leaving. Law later deactivated his Facebook account over worries about the negative responses.
