= Dalen Church =

Church in Innlandet, Norway

- Dalen kyrkje
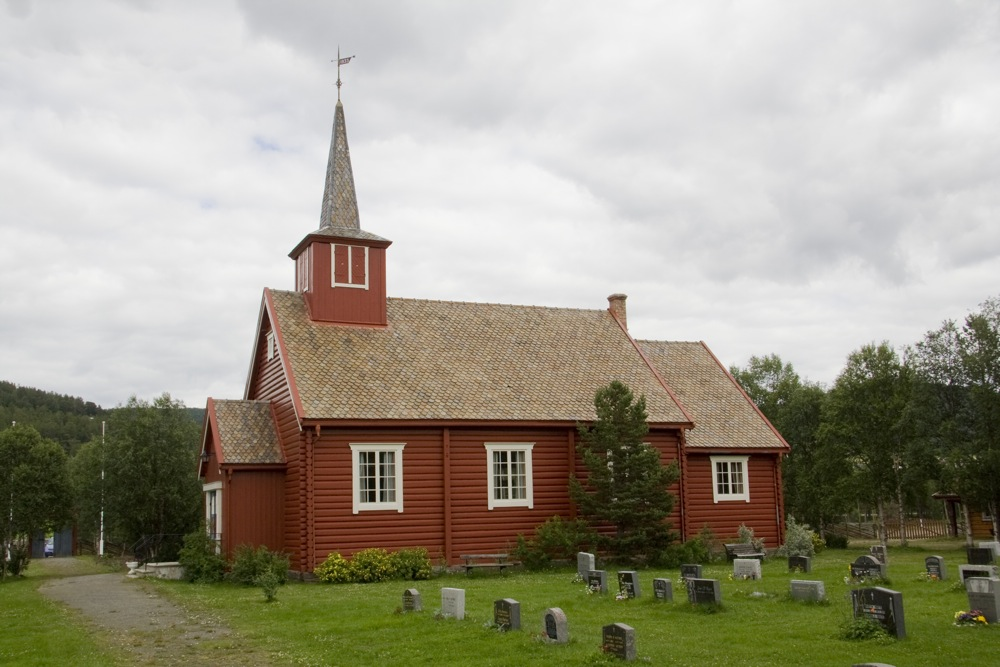
- View of the church
- Dalen Church
- 62°10′33″N 9°48′45″E
- Location: Folldal Municipality, Innlandet
- Country: Norway
- Denomination: Church of Norway
- Churchmanship: Evangelical Lutheran

History
- Status: Parish church
- Founded: 1933
- Consecrated: 1934

Architecture
- Functional status: Active
- Architect: Einar Landmark
- Architectural type: Long church
- Completed: 1933 (93 years ago)

Specifications
- Capacity: 252
- Materials: Wood

Administration
- Diocese: Hamar bispedømme
- Deanery: Nord-Østerdal prosti
- Parish: Øvre Folldal
- Norwegian Cultural Heritage Site
- Type: Church
- Status: Not protected
- ID: 84018

Dalen Church (Nynorsk: Dalen kyrkje) is a parish church of the Church of Norway in Folldal Municipality in Innlandet county, Norway. It is located in the village of Dalholen. It is the church for the Øvre Folldal parish which is part of the Nord-Østerdal prosti (deanery) in the Diocese of Hamar. The white, wooden church was built in a long church design in 1933 using plans drawn up by the architect Einar Landmark. The church seats about 252 people.

== History ==
In 1914 or 1915, a cemetery was built in Dalholen to serve the upper Folldalen valley. Less than 20 years later, the parish began planning for the construction of a new church at the cemetery. Einar Landmark was hired to design the new church. It was built in 1933 and consecrated in 1934. It is a wooden long church with a rectangular nave and a smaller, narrower choir with a lower roof line. There is a bell tower on the west end of the nave's roof. There's also a small church porch on the west end of the building.

== Media gallery ==
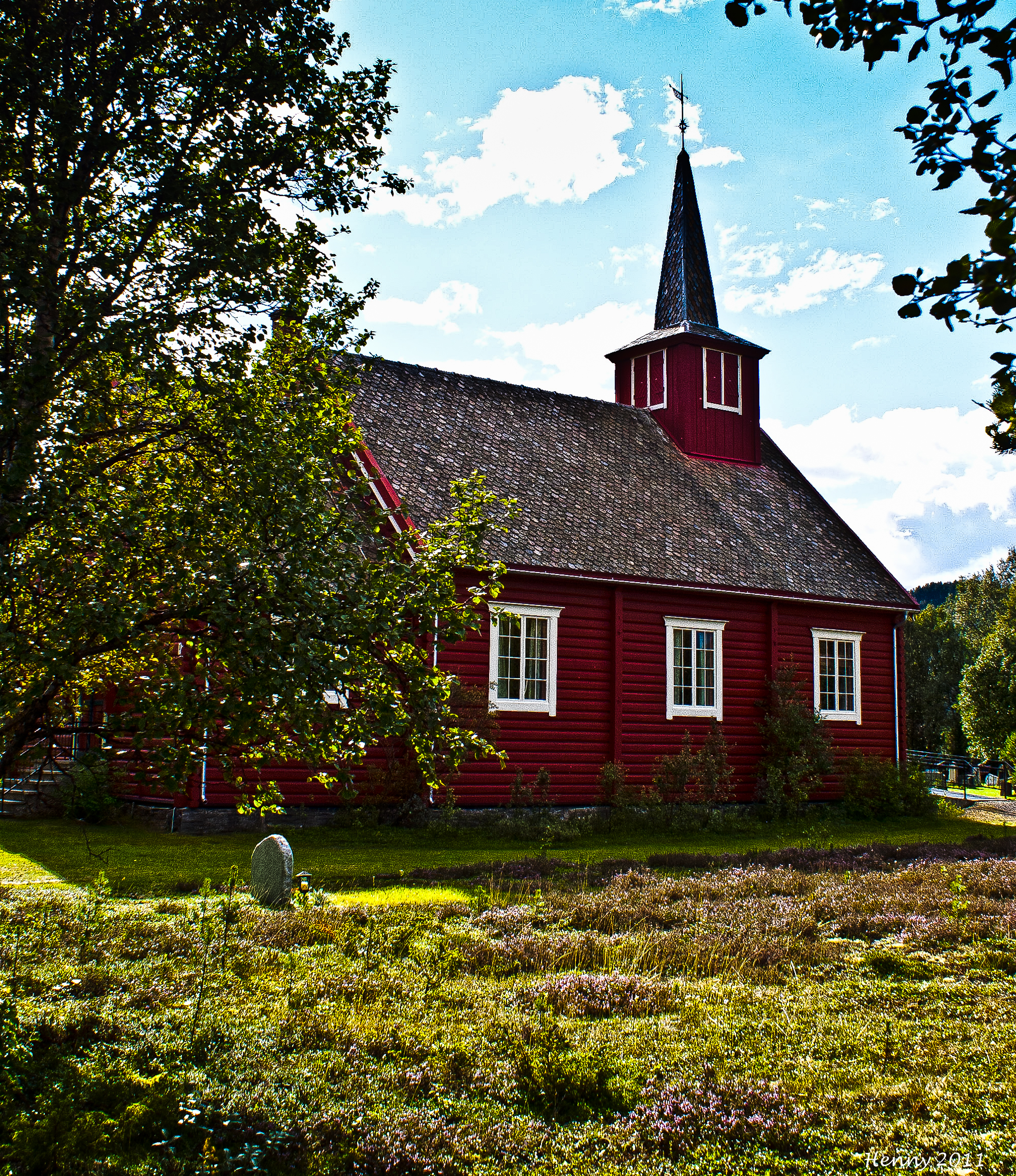

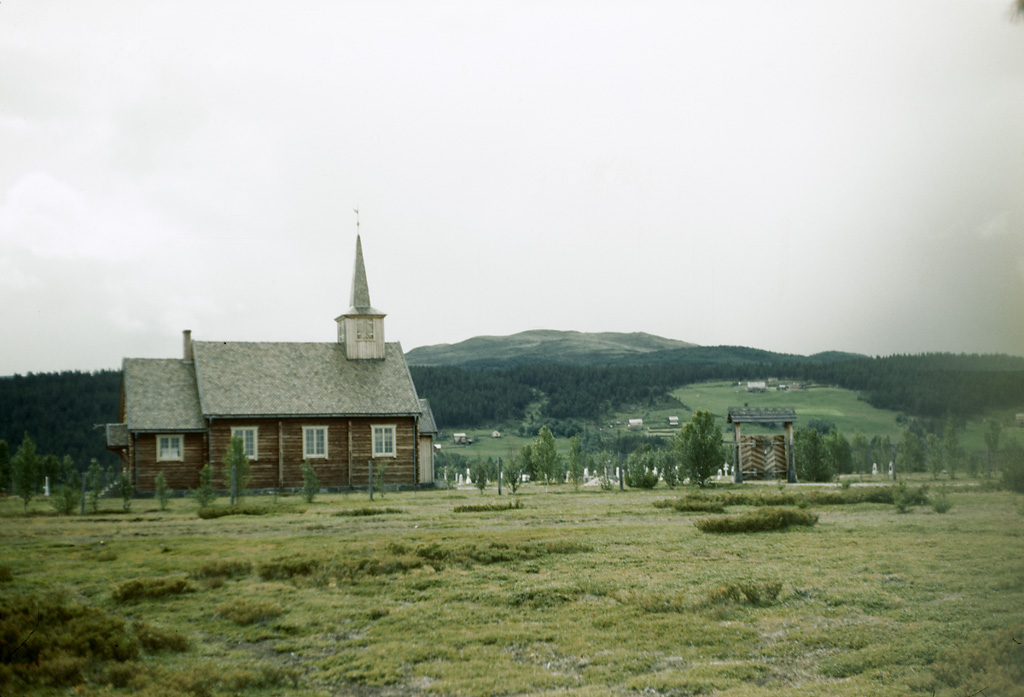

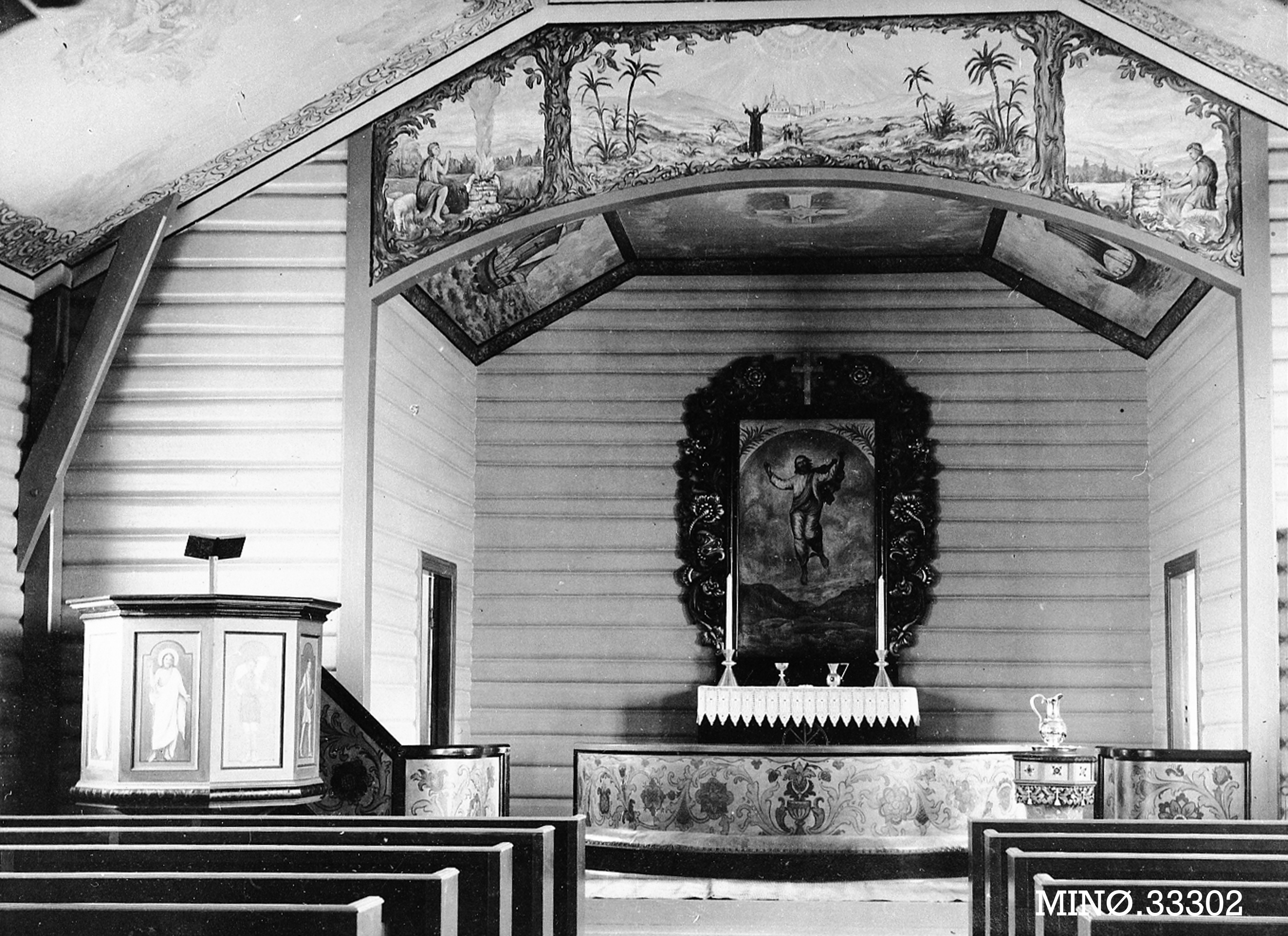

== See also ==
- List of churches in Hamar
