= Norwegian County Road 27 =

Roan in Innlandet, Norway

County Road 27
- Bokmål: Fylkesvei 27; Nynorsk: Fylkesveg 27
- Location in Norway

Route information
- Length: 82.7 km (51.4 mi)

Major junctions
- North end: Folldal, Innlandet
- South end: Ringebu, Innlandet

Location
- Country: Norway

Highway system
- Roads in Norway; National Roads; County Roads

County Road 27 (Norwegian: Fylkesvei 27) is a county road which runs between Ringebu and Folldal in Innlandet county, Norway. The road is 82.7 kilometres (51.4 mi) long and 26.1 kilometres (16.2 mi) of it lie in the former Oppland county and 56.6 kilometres (35.2 mi) of it lie in the former Hedmark county. The road runs through Folldal, Stor-Elvdal, and Ringebu municipalities. The northern part of this road in Folldal and Stor-Elvdal municipalities is classified as a national tourist route.

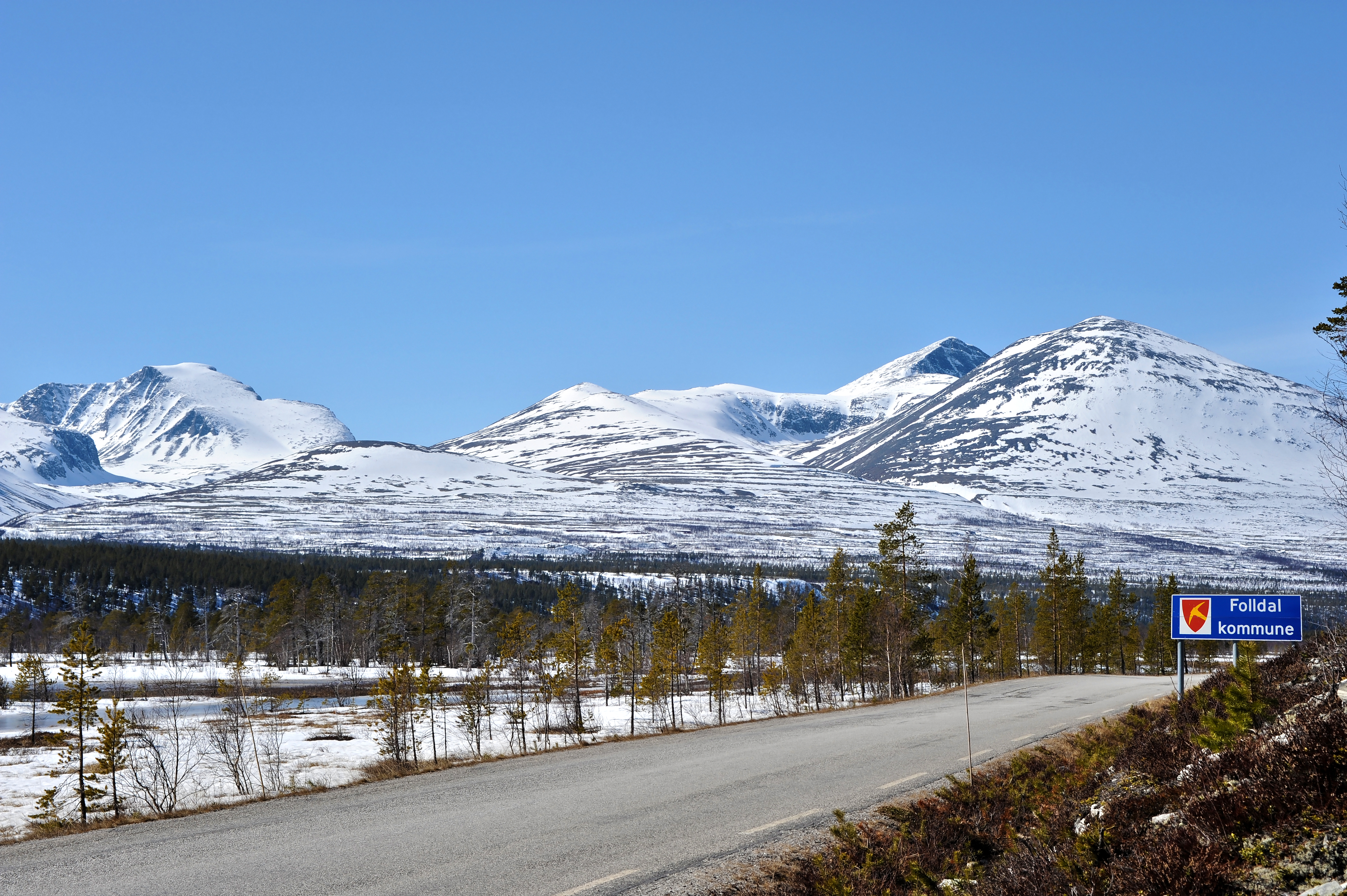
County Road 27 along Atnsjømyrene and Rondane National Park

Historically, County Road 27 went from Folldal to Enden (in Stor-Elvdal Municipality) and then turned east through Sollia and headed to Atna where it ended. At that time, the stretch of road between Enden and Ringebu was called National Road 220. On 1 January 2010, National Road 220 became part of County Road 27 and what used to be County Road 27 from Enden to Atna was renamed County Road 219.
