= Fadden =

Fadden may refer to:

== People ==
- Arthur Fadden (1894–1973), briefly Prime Minister of Australia in 1941
- Harry Delmar Fadden (1882–1955), United States Navy sailor and recipient of the Medal of Honor
- Richard Fadden (born 1951), director of the Canadian Security Intelligence Service (CSIS)
- Tom Fadden (1895–1980), American actor

Variant

- Ruth Faden, professor and Executive Director of The Johns Hopkins Berman Institute of Bioethics

== Places ==
- Fadden, Australian Capital Territory, a suburb of Canberra named after Arthur Fadden

== Other uses ==
- Division of Fadden, an electorate in the Australian House of Representatives, also named after Arthur Fadden

== See also ==
- McFadden (disambiguation)
