= Folldal (village) =

Village in Folldal Municipality, Norway

- Village
- Interactive map of Folldal
- Location within Innlandet Location within Norway
- Coordinates: 62.1325°N 9.9967°E
- Country: Norway
- Region: Eastern Norway
- County: Innlandet
- District: Østerdalen
- Municipality: Folldal Municipality

Area
  - Total: 1.04 km^{2} (0.40 sq mi)
- Elevation: 709 m (2,326 ft)

Population (2024)
  - Total: 509
  - Density: 489/km^{2} (1,270/sq mi)
- Time zone: UTC+01:00 (CET)
  - Summer (DST): UTC+02:00 (CEST)
- Post Code: 2580 Folldal

Folldal is the administrative centre of Folldal Municipality in Innlandet county, Norway. The village is located along the river Folla which is a tributary of the large river Glåma. The village grew up around the old Folldal mine. The village lies at the intersection of Norwegian County Road 29 and Norwegian County Road 27. Folldal Church is located on the east side of the village.

The 1.04-square-kilometre (260-acre) village has a population (2024) of 509 and a population density of 489 inhabitants per square kilometre (1,270/sq mi).

Folldal is located a short distance east of Dovre National Park and Rondane National Park.
