= Folldal Church =

Church in Innlandet, Norway

- Folldal kirke
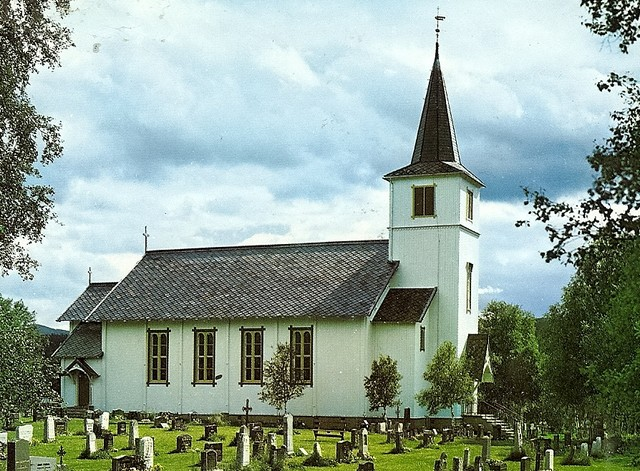
- View of the church
- Folldal Church
- 62°07′37″N 10°02′20″E
- Location: Folldal Municipality, Innlandet
- Country: Norway
- Denomination: Church of Norway
- Churchmanship: Evangelical Lutheran

History
- Status: Parish church
- Founded: 1751
- Consecrated: 18 October 1882

Architecture
- Functional status: Active
- Architect: Henrik Nissen
- Architectural type: Long church
- Completed: 1882 (144 years ago)

Specifications
- Capacity: 320
- Materials: Wood

Administration
- Diocese: Hamar bispedømme
- Deanery: Nord-Østerdal prosti
- Parish: Folldal
- Norwegian Cultural Heritage Site
- Type: Church
- Status: Listed
- ID: 84177

Folldal Church (Norwegian: Folldal kirke) is a parish church of the Church of Norway in Folldal Municipality in Innlandet county, Norway. It is located in the village of Folldal. It is the church for the Folldal parish which is part of the Nord-Østerdal prosti (deanery) in the Diocese of Hamar. The white, wooden church was built in a long church design in 1882 using plans drawn up by the architect Henrik Nissen. The church seats about 320 people.

== History ==
In 1746, the parish submitted an application to build a new church in the village of Folldal. Construction on the new church took place from 1747 until 1751. The new church was consecrated on 5 December 1751. The new church was a timber-framed cruciform building that was located on the same site as the present church. In 1875–1876, the parish debated replacing the old church with a new, larger church. Henrik Nissen was hired to design the new church. The drawings and plans for the new church were approved in April 1879. In 1881, the old church was torn down. Work on the new church began soon after. It was said, however, that the builder, Hans Johnsen from Røros, did not follow the drawings exactly. For example, he was not content with one sacristy, as the plans called for, so he built another sacristy so that the church would be symmetrical. He also built the nave somewhat narrower and shorter than the original plan. The new long church was completed in 1882 and it was consecrated on 18 October 1882. Over the years, the exterior was painted red and then later painted white. In 1956, the church was wired for electricity.

== Media gallery ==
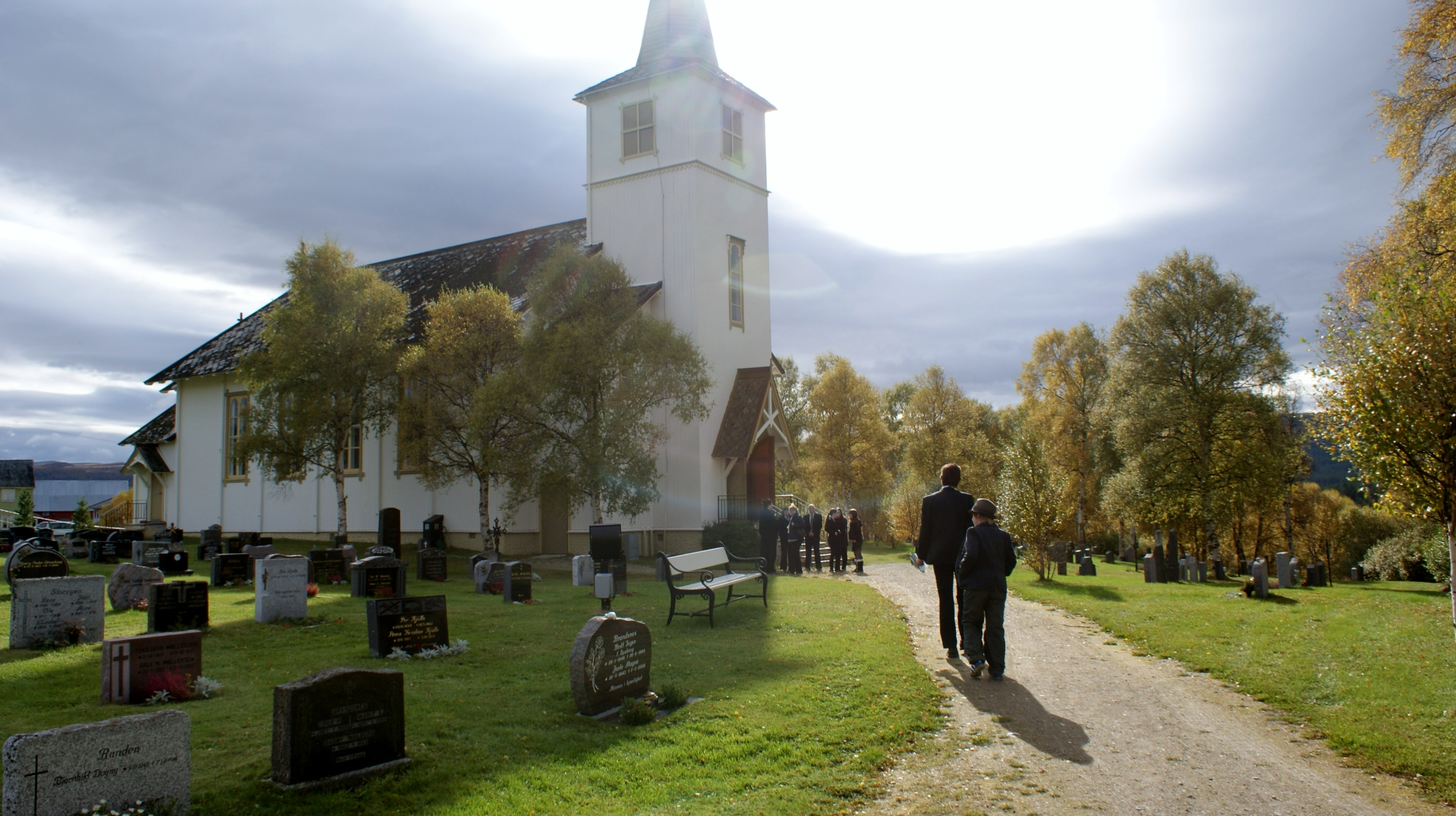

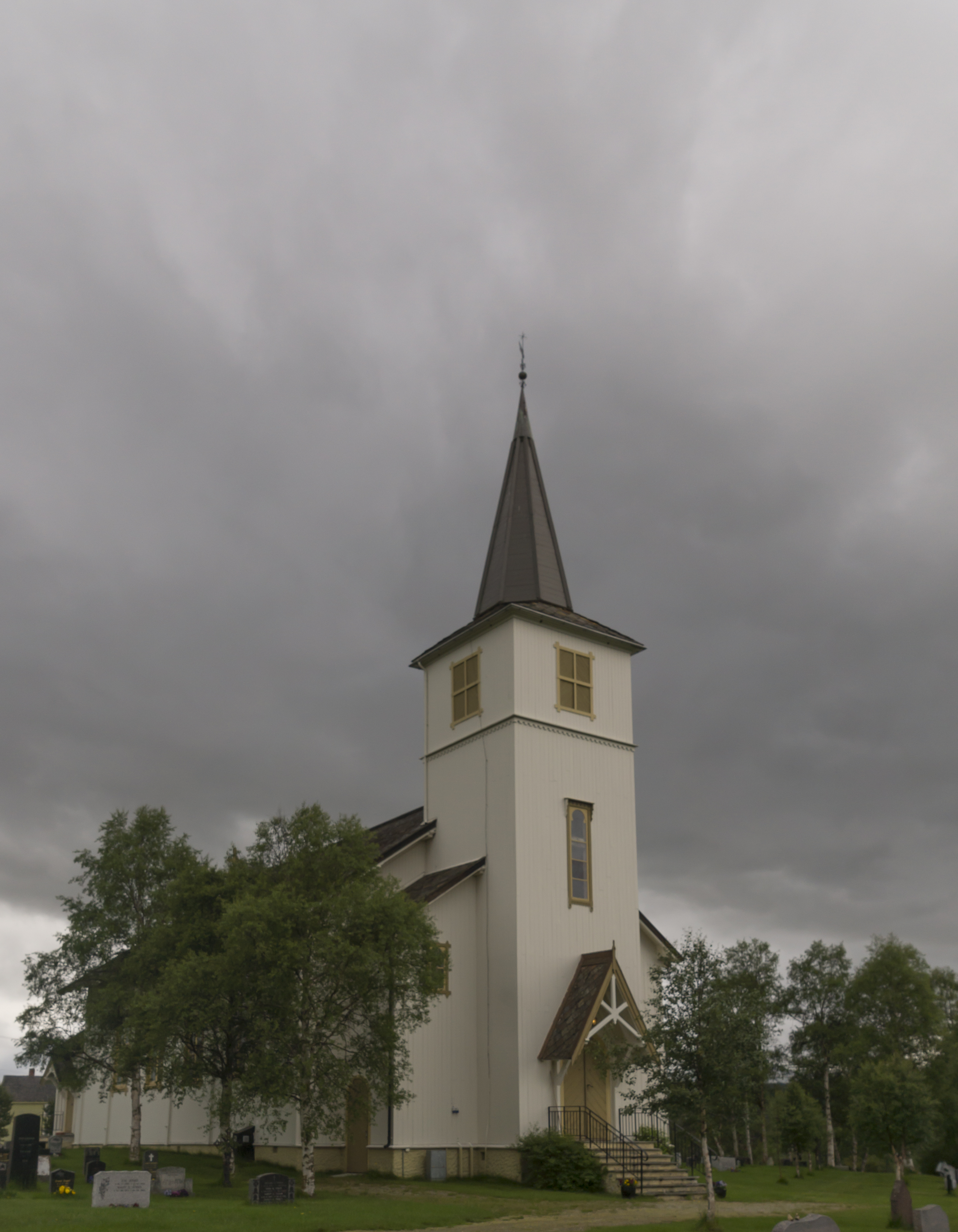

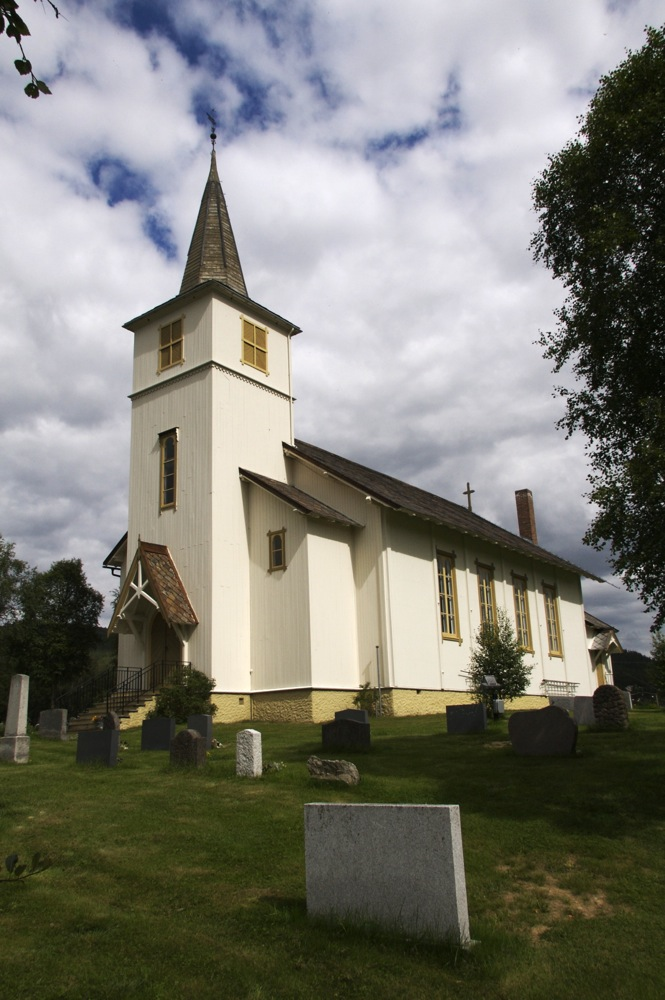

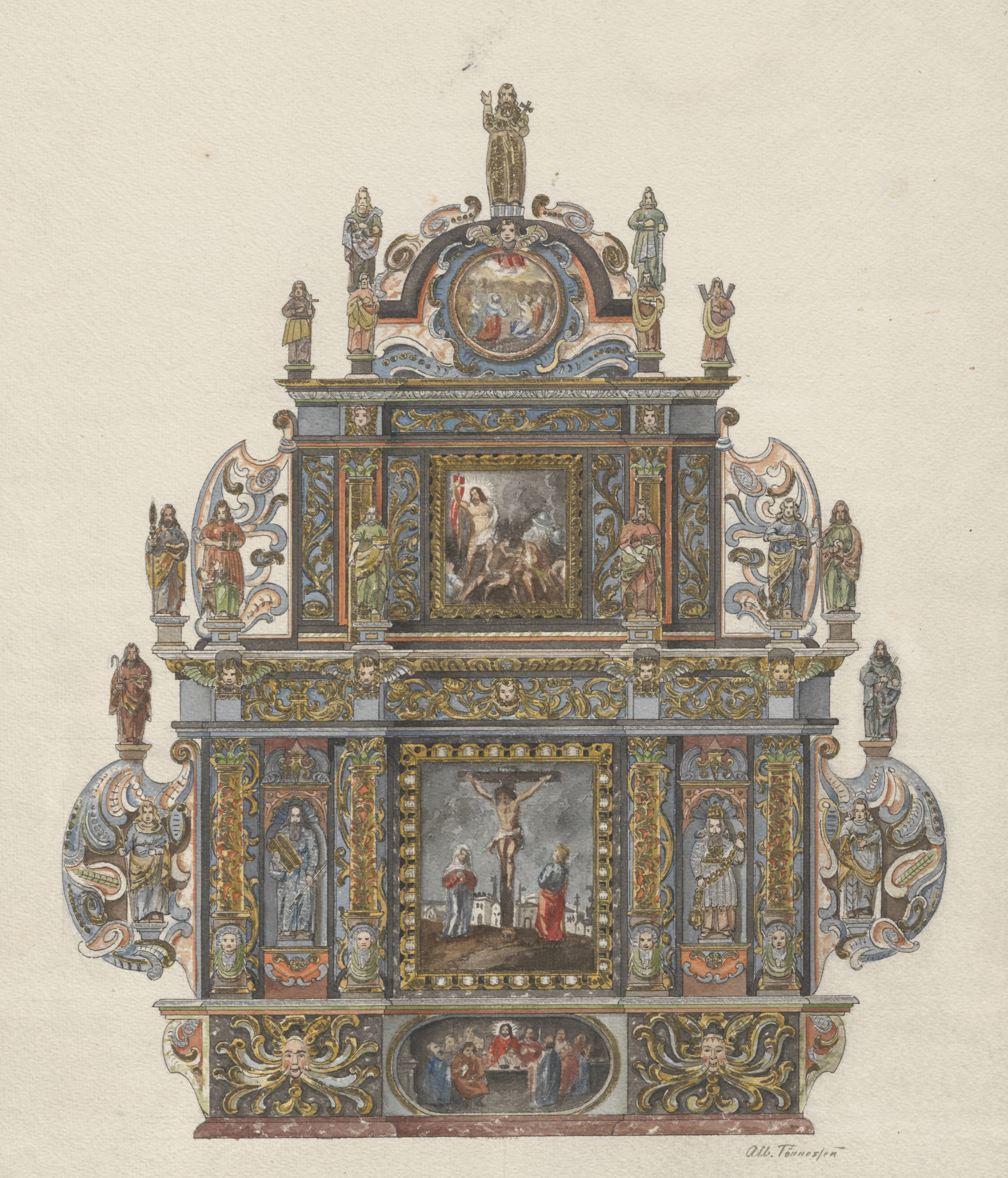

== See also ==
- List of churches in Hamar
