= Fatin al-Murr =

Lebanese academic and writer (born 1969)

Faten el-Murr (Arabic: فاتن المرّ; born 1969) is a Lebanese academic and writer. She is a holder of a doctorate degree, she is currently a professor of French literature at the Lebanese University in Zahle.

== Works ==
Her first work of fiction was published in 1999, a collection of short stories called Bayn intizarayn (Between Two Periods of Waiting). She has since written two novels, The Time After and Common Sins. The latter was nominated for the Arabic Booker Prize in 2010, and longlisted for the International Prize for Arabic Fiction in 2011.
