= Het Luitboek van Thysius =

Book of lute music

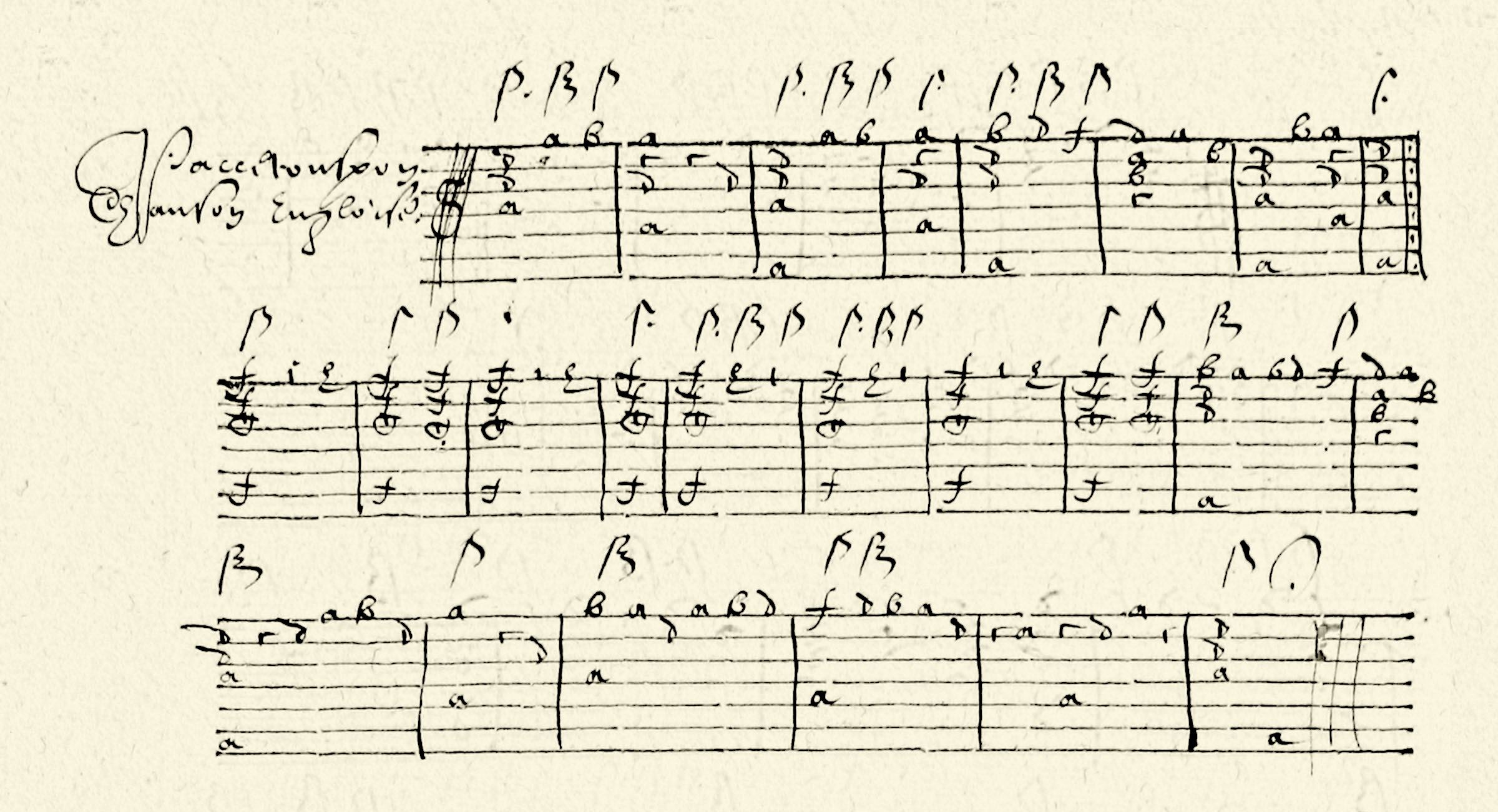
English dance from the Thysius' book for the lute

Het Luitboek van Thysius (English: The Lute Book of Thysius) is a book of music for the lute. It was written by Adriaen Smout from Rotterdam, who started at the University of Leiden in 1595 and later became a notable contra-Remonstrant preacher.

It was acquired shortly after Smout's death by Joan Thys (Latinised into Thysius), a Leiden book collector, after whom it is named—Thys' library (including the Luitboek) still survives today in Leiden's Rapenburg as the Bibliotheca Thysiana. A reprint of the book was published in 2009.

== Publication ==
- Adriaen Smout: The Thysius Lute Book / Het luitboek van Thysius. 3 vols., Leiden & Utrecht. 2009. ISBN 978-90-6552-055-5.
