= Fat Hen =

Fat hen or fat-hen may refer to:

- Hen and chicks, a group of small succulent flowering plants native to Europe and northern Africa
- Fat-hen, Chenopodium album, a fast-growing weedy annual plant cultivated in some places and a weed elsewhere
- Atriplex prostrata, a plant in the orache or saltbush genus
- Fette Henne, or "fat hen", nickname for the portly eagle of the Coat of arms of Germany that used to decorate the chamber of the Bundestag in Bonn, Germany, and on certain German Euro coins
- Fette Henne (Berlin-Neukölln), artwork in the Britzer Garten
