= Folldal Municipality =

Municipality in Innlandet, Norway

Folldal Municipality Folldal kommune
- Municipality
- Folldalen herred (historic name)
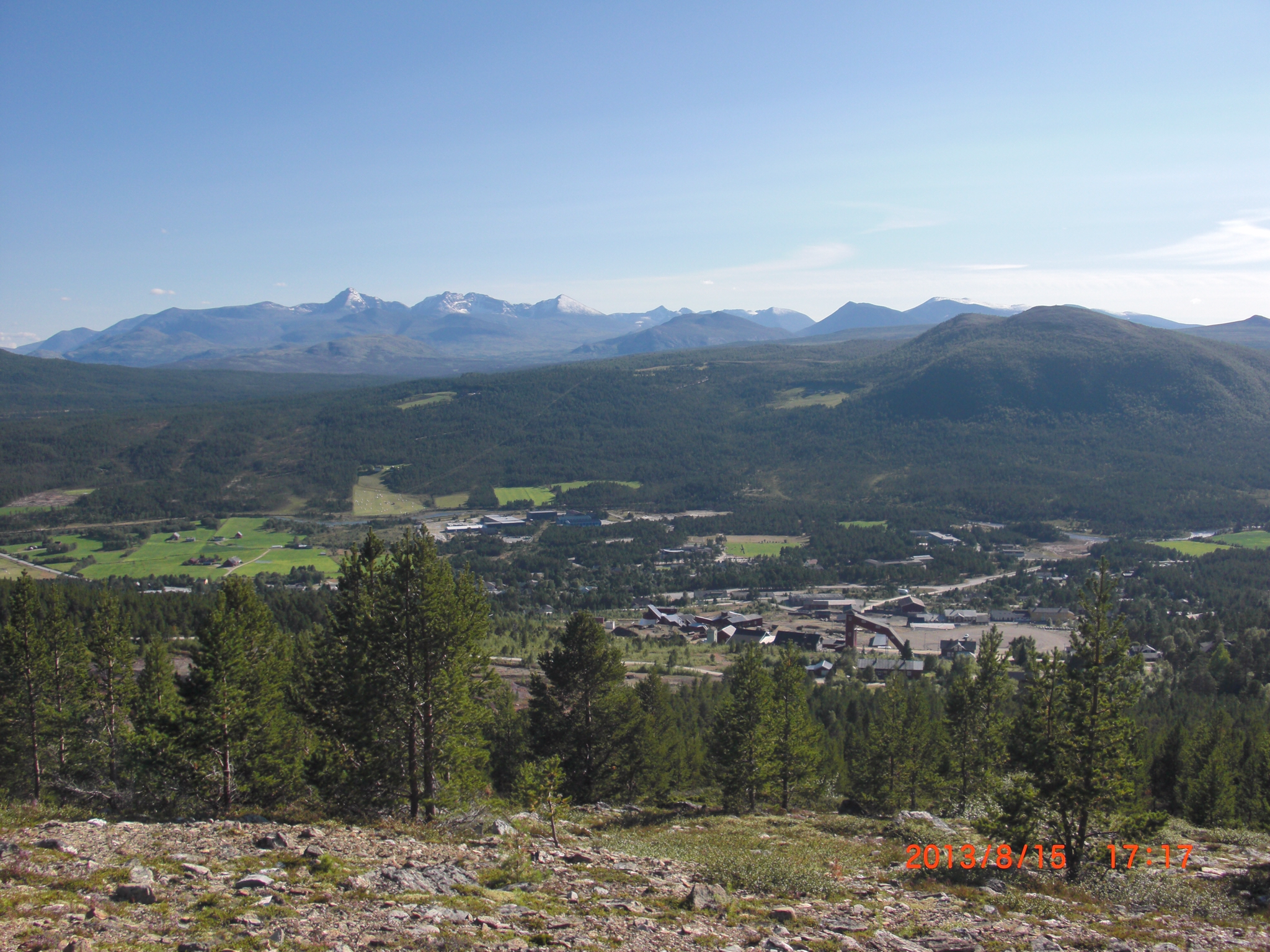

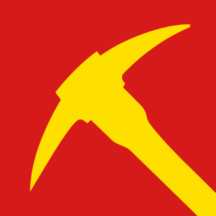
- Flag Coat of arms

- Innlandet within Norway

- Folldal within Innlandet
- Coordinates: 62°11′57″N 10°2′7″E
- Country: Norway
- County: Innlandet
- District: Østerdalen
- Established: 1 Jan 1914
  - Preceded by: Alvdal Municipality
- Administrative centre: Folldal

Government
  - Mayor (2019): Kristin Langtjernet (Ap)

Area
  - Total: 1,277.07 km^{2} (493.08 sq mi)
  - Land: 1,260.28 km^{2} (486.60 sq mi)
  - Water: 16.79 km^{2} (6.48 sq mi) 1.3%
  - Rank: #79 in Norway
- Highest elevation: 2,178.45 m (7,147.1 ft)

Population (2025)
  - Total: 1,540
  - Rank: #302 in Norway
  - Density: 1.2/km^{2} (3.1/sq mi)
  - Change (10 years): ▼ −6.1%
- Demonym: Folldøl

Official language
  - Norwegian form: Neutral
- Time zone: UTC+01:00 (CET)
  - Summer (DST): UTC+02:00 (CEST)
- ISO 3166 code: NO-3429
- Website: Official website

Folldal is a municipality in Innlandet county, Norway. It is located in the traditional district of Østerdalen. The administrative centre of the municipality is the village of Folldal. The municipality was established in 1914 when it was separated from Alvdal Municipality.

Folldal is bordered on the north by Oppdal Municipality and Tynset Municipality; in the east by Alvdal Municipality; in the south by Stor-Elvdal Municipality, Sør-Fron Municipality, and Sel Municipality; and in the west by Dovre Municipality. Mining at the Folldal Gruver mines was the main industry for Folldal's residents from the 18th century until the last mine-related operations ceased in 1993.

The 1,277-square-kilometre (493 sq mi) municipality is the 79th largest by area out of the 357 municipalities in Norway. Folldal Municipality is the 302nd most populous municipality in Norway with a population of 1,540. The municipality's population density is 1.2 inhabitants per square kilometre (3.1/sq mi) and its population has decreased by 6.1% over the previous 10-year period.

== General information ==
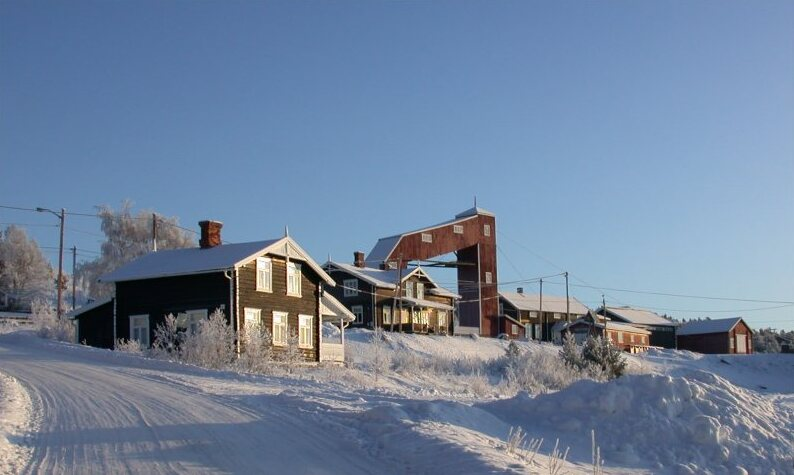
Winter in Folldal. Credit: Stiftelsen Folldal Gruver

Historically, the parish of Folldal was a part of Alvdal Municipality since 1838 (see Formannskapsdistrikt law). On 1 January 1914, the northern parish of Folldal was separated from Alvdal to become a separate municipality. Initially, Folldal Municipality had a population of 2,284. On 1 January 1970, the three western farms at Børgsungsætri (population: 11) were transferred from the neighboring Dovre Municipality (in Oppland county) to Folldal Municipality (in Hedmark county). On 28 September 1990, a small, unpopulated part of Sør-Fron Municipality (in Oppland county) was transferred to Folldal Municipality (in Hedmark county).

Historically, the municipality was part of Hedmark county. On 1 January 2020, the municipality became a part of the newly-formed Innlandet county (after Hedmark and Oppland counties were merged).

=== Name ===
The municipality (originally the parish) is named after the old Folldal farm since the first Folldal Church was built there. The first element comes from the name of the local river Folla which has an unknown meaning (perhaps something like "the broad one"). The last element is dalr which means "valley" or "dale". Historically, the name of the municipality was spelled Folldalen. On 3 November 1917, a royal resolution changed the spelling of the name of the municipality to Folldal.

=== Coat of arms ===
The coat of arms was granted on 21 September 1988. The official blazon is "Gules, a pickaxe Or in bend issuant from base sinister" (Norwegian: I rødt en skrått framvoksende gull hakke). This means the arms have a red field (background) and the charge is a diagonal pickaxe. The pickaxe has a tincture of Or which means it is commonly colored yellow, but if it is made out of metal, then gold is used. This design was chosen to represent the mining and agriculture industries in the municipality. The pickaxe was an important tool of miners and thus symbolizes the mining industry, which was the reason for Folldal municipality to be established in 1914. There was mining activity in the Folldal area from 1748 until 1993. The pickaxe also stands for farming as it was an essential tool in clearing the ground for farms in Folldal back when the area was first settled. The arms were designed by Sverre Morken. The municipal flag has the same design as the coat of arms.

=== Churches ===
The Church of Norway has two parishes (sokn) within Folldal Municipality. It is part of the Nord-Østerdal prosti (deanery) in the Diocese of Hamar.

Churches in Folldal
Parish (sokn)	Church name	Location of the church	Year built
Folldal	Folldal Church	Folldal	1882
Folldal	Egnund Chapel	Einabu	1975
Øvre Folldal	Dalen Church	Dalholen	1934

The main Folldal Church was historically a satellite church of the nearby Lesja Church, as was the church at the iron ore mines at Lesjaverk (Lesja Iron Works). Per Berg reports,

"When the sexton Ola Kring died in Lesja in 1751, Frederik Wiborg was appointed sexton there and was presented to the congregation on the third Sunday following Trinity. There certainly wasn't anything very special about being a teacher in Ringsaker, if he was willing to change that for being a sexton. No house or land went with the post and the work was hard. In the Lesja parish there were three satellite churches - Lesjeverk, Dovre, and Folldal. The travel distances were great and it could be very difficult in the winter."

== History ==
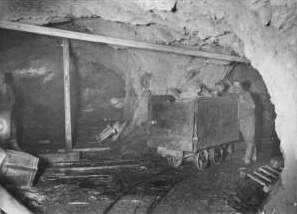
Interior view of the Gammelgruva mine.

Mining has been important to Folldal's development from the 18th century to the present. The Folldal works (Norwegian: Folldal Verk) was founded in 1748. Folldal's main copper mine, Gammelgruva, also opened in 1748. The mine employed up to 550 people. Until 1878, ore was transported by horse-drawn vehicles to the Lovise smelter located in neighboring Alvdal Municipality. From 1878 to 1906 there was a lull in operations. Operations were restarted in 1906 when ore was transported by a 34-kilometre (21 mi) long cable car (Northern Europe's longest) to the smelter. The main mine played out and was closed in 1941. Smelting continued using ore from several other deposits in the area until 1968. Then the mining and ore dressing moved to Tverrfjellet at Hjerkinn, in neighboring Dovre Municipality, approximately 30 kilometres (19 mi) from Folldal. The business was closed in 1993.

== Government ==
Folldal Municipality is responsible for primary education (through 10th grade), outpatient health services, senior citizen services, welfare and other social services, zoning, economic development, and municipal roads and utilities. The municipality is governed by a municipal council of directly elected representatives. The mayor is indirectly elected by a vote of the municipal council. The municipality is under the jurisdiction of the Hedmarken og Østerdal District Court and the Eidsivating Court of Appeal.

=== Municipal council ===
The municipal council (Kommunestyre) of Folldal Municipality is made up of 17 representatives that are elected to four year terms. The tables below show the current and historical composition of the council by political party.

Folldal kommunestyre 2023–2027
Party name (in Norwegian)	Number of representatives
Labour Party (Arbeiderpartiet)	9
Red Party (Rødt)	1
Centre Party (Senterpartiet)	5
Folldal List (Folldalslista)	2
Total number of members:	17

Folldal kommunestyre 2019–2023
Party name (in Norwegian)	Number of representatives
Labour Party (Arbeiderpartiet)	7
Red Party (Rødt)	2
Centre Party (Senterpartiet)	6
Common List (Samlingslista)	2
Total number of members:	17

Folldal kommunestyre 2015–2019
Party name (in Norwegian)	Number of representatives
Labour Party (Arbeiderpartiet)	5
Red Party (Rødt)	1
Centre Party (Senterpartiet)	7
Common list (Samlingslista)	4
Total number of members:	17

Folldal kommunestyre 2011–2015
Party name (in Norwegian)	Number of representatives
Labour Party (Arbeiderpartiet)	8
Centre Party (Senterpartiet)	7
Socialist Left Party (Sosialistisk Venstreparti)	2
Total number of members:	17

Folldal kommunestyre 2007–2011
Party name (in Norwegian)	Number of representatives
Labour Party (Arbeiderpartiet)	10
Centre Party (Senterpartiet)	6
Socialist Left Party (Sosialistisk Venstreparti)	1
Total number of members:	17

Folldal kommunestyre 2003–2007
Party name (in Norwegian)	Number of representatives
Labour Party (Arbeiderpartiet)	8
Centre Party (Senterpartiet)	5
Socialist Left Party (Sosialistisk Venstreparti)	2
Free Voters (Frie Velgere)	2
Total number of members:	17

Folldal kommunestyre 1999–2003
Party name (in Norwegian)	Number of representatives
Labour Party (Arbeiderpartiet)	7
Centre Party (Senterpartiet)	6
Socialist Left Party (Sosialistisk Venstreparti)	1
Free Voters (Frie Velgere)	3
Total number of members:	17

Folldal kommunestyre 1995–1999
Party name (in Norwegian)	Number of representatives
Labour Party (Arbeiderpartiet)	10
Centre Party (Senterpartiet)	6
Free Voters (Frie Velgere)	1
Total number of members:	17

Folldal kommunestyre 1991–1995
Party name (in Norwegian)	Number of representatives
Labour Party (Arbeiderpartiet)	10
Centre Party (Senterpartiet)	5
Socialist Left Party (Sosialistisk Venstreparti)	1
Free Voters (Frie Velgere)	1
Total number of members:	17

Folldal kommunestyre 1987–1991
Party name (in Norwegian)	Number of representatives
Labour Party (Arbeiderpartiet)	10
Centre Party (Senterpartiet)	6
Free Voters (Frie Velgere)	1
Total number of members:	17

Folldal kommunestyre 1983–1987
Party name (in Norwegian)	Number of representatives
Labour Party (Arbeiderpartiet)	8
Centre Party (Senterpartiet)	7
Free Voters (Frie Velgere)	2
Total number of members:	17

Folldal kommunestyre 1979–1983
Party name (in Norwegian)	Number of representatives
Labour Party (Arbeiderpartiet)	8
Centre Party (Senterpartiet)	6
Free Voters (Frie Velgere)	3
Total number of members:	17

Folldal kommunestyre 1975–1979
Party name (in Norwegian)	Number of representatives
Labour Party (Arbeiderpartiet)	8
Centre Party (Senterpartiet)	7
Free Voters (Frie Velgere)	2
Total number of members:	17

Folldal kommunestyre 1971–1975
Party name (in Norwegian)	Number of representatives
Labour Party (Arbeiderpartiet)	7
Centre Party (Senterpartiet)	5
Local List(s) (Lokale lister)	3
Total number of members:	17

Folldal kommunestyre 1967–1971
Party name (in Norwegian)	Number of representatives
Labour Party (Arbeiderpartiet)	10
Centre Party (Senterpartiet)	7
Total number of members:	17

Folldal kommunestyre 1963–1967
Party name (in Norwegian)	Number of representatives
Labour Party (Arbeiderpartiet)	9
Centre Party (Senterpartiet)	8
Total number of members:	17

Folldal herredsstyre 1959–1963
Party name (in Norwegian)	Number of representatives
Labour Party (Arbeiderpartiet)	10
Centre Party (Senterpartiet)	7
Total number of members:	17

Folldal herredsstyre 1955–1959
Party name (in Norwegian)	Number of representatives
Labour Party (Arbeiderpartiet)	9
Joint List(s) of Non-Socialist Parties (Borgerlige Felleslister)	8
Total number of members:	17

Folldal herredsstyre 1951–1955
Party name (in Norwegian)	Number of representatives
Labour Party (Arbeiderpartiet)	6
Joint List(s) of Non-Socialist Parties (Borgerlige Felleslister)	6
Total number of members:	12

Folldal herredsstyre 1947–1951
Party name (in Norwegian)	Number of representatives
Labour Party (Arbeiderpartiet)	7
Joint List(s) of Non-Socialist Parties (Borgerlige Felleslister)	5
Total number of members:	12

Folldal herredsstyre 1945–1947
Party name (in Norwegian)	Number of representatives
Labour Party (Arbeiderpartiet)	7
Joint List(s) of Non-Socialist Parties (Borgerlige Felleslister)	5
Total number of members:	12

Folldal herredsstyre 1937–1941*
Party name (in Norwegian)	Number of representatives
Labour Party (Arbeiderpartiet)	6
Joint List(s) of Non-Socialist Parties (Borgerlige Felleslister)	6
Total number of members:	12
Note: Due to the German occupation of Norway during World War II, no elections were held for new municipal councils until after the war ended in 1945.

=== Mayors ===
The mayor (Norwegian: ordfører) of Folldal Municipality is the political leader of the municipality and the chairperson of the municipal council. Here is a list of people who have held this position:

- 1914–1915: Gurin Edvard Hoel
- 1915–1917: O. Eide
- 1917–1923: Einar Brandsnes (FV)
- 1923–1928: O. Eide
- 1928–1931: Einar Brandsnes (Bp)
- 1931–1942: Per B. Støen (Ap)
- 1942–1943: Edvard Skinstad
- 1943–1945: Johan Sandberg
- 1946–1951: Ingmar Brandsnes (Ap)
- 1951–1955: Kåre Kristoffersen (Ap)
- 1955–1965: Birger Aspås (Ap)
- 1965–1971: Lars Hansen (Ap)
- 1971–1987: Håvard Bonesvoll (Sp)
- 1987–1999: Erling Brandsnes (Ap)
- 1999–2003: Hans Einar Thompson (Ap)
- 2003–2011: Eva Tørhaug (Ap)
- 2011–2015: Egil Eide (Sp)
- 2015–2019: Hilde F. Tveråen (Ap)
- 2019–present: Kristin Langtjernet (Ap)

== Geography ==
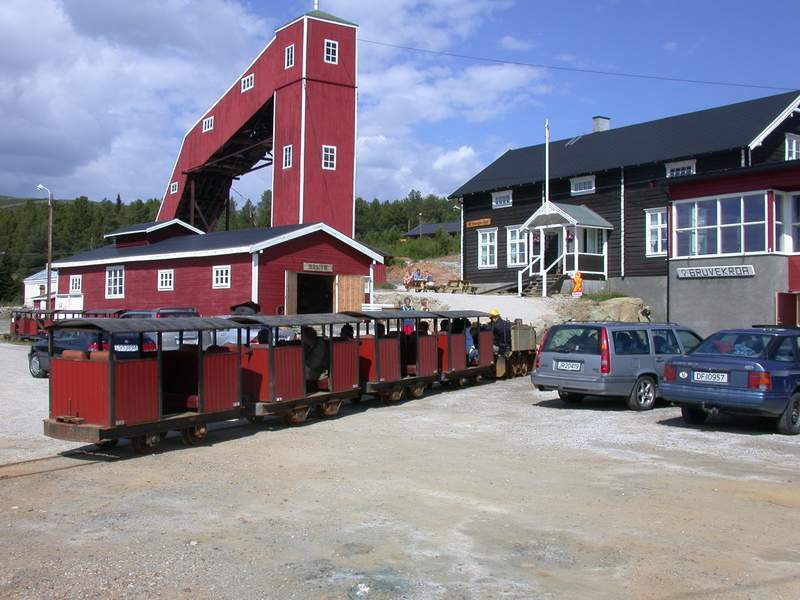
Train with tourists heading into the mine. Reprinted with permission from Foundation Folldal Mines

Folldal is located along the northern border of Innlandet county. It is bordered in the northwest by Oppdal Municipality (in Trøndelag county). The rest of the surrounding municipalities are all in Innlandet county. Tynset Municipality lies to the northeast, Alvdal Municipality is to the east, Stor-Elvdal Municipality is to the southeast, Sør-Fron Municipality and Sel Municipality are to the south, and Dovre Municipality is to the west.

The highest point in the municipality is the 2,178.45-metre (7,147.1 ft) tall mountain Rondeslottet. Folldal Municipality is notable because the village of Folldal, its administrative center, has the highest elevation (712.5 metres or 2,338 feet above sea level) of all administrative centres in Norway. The village has picturesque scenery with mountains and valleys. The village lies at the foot of Rondeslottet mountain and Snøhetta mountain.

The area also has many interesting geologic features from the last Ice Age. Norway's longest seter valley, the 55-kilometre (34 mi) long Einunndalen, lies within the municipality. The Einunndalen valley is still actively used for summer grazing at the seters (mountain summer farms) established in the 1700s. Almost half of the municipal land is protected as conservation areas and national parks, including parts that are included in the Rondane National Park and Dovre National Park.

A national tourist road, the Norwegian County Road 27, runs through the municipality.

== Climate ==
Folldal has a subarctic climate (Dfc) with short, cool summers and long, cold winters. Situated in a mountain valley on the southern, continental side of the Dovre mountain range at 694 metres (2,277 ft) above sea level, it has the coldest winters in the southern half of Norway.

Climate data for Folldal (2011-) Mean average temperatures and precipitation (694 m).
Month	Jan	Feb	Mar	Apr	May	Jun	Jul	Aug	Sep	Oct	Nov	Dec	Year
Record high °C (°F)	9.8 (49.6)	11.8 (53.2)	14.5 (58.1)	18.1 (64.6)	27.2 (81.0)	29.2 (84.6)	30.7 (87.3)	25.3 (77.5)	25.1 (77.2)	22.1 (71.8)	12.8 (55.0)	9.9 (49.8)	30.7 (87.3)
Daily mean °C (°F)	−10.4 (13.3)	−8.9 (16.0)	−4.9 (23.2)	0.5 (32.9)	5.3 (41.5)	9.5 (49.1)	12.3 (54.1)	10.7 (51.3)	6.5 (43.7)	0.3 (32.5)	−5.9 (21.4)	−9.7 (14.5)	0.4 (32.8)
Record low °C (°F)	−39.3 (−38.7)	−42.0 (−43.6)	−41.8 (−43.2)	−29.5 (−21.1)	−12.1 (10.2)	−6.3 (20.7)	−4.1 (24.6)	−5.4 (22.3)	−9.8 (14.4)	−24.1 (−11.4)	−34.5 (−30.1)	−40.9 (−41.6)	−42.0 (−43.6)
Average precipitation mm (inches)	22.0 (0.87)	16.2 (0.64)	15.6 (0.61)	13.7 (0.54)	34.4 (1.35)	53.7 (2.11)	67.9 (2.67)	78.1 (3.07)	29.2 (1.15)	28.8 (1.13)	25.6 (1.01)	20.9 (0.82)	406.1 (15.97)
Source: Folldal at yr.no

== Outdoors ==
Folldal Municipality offers a wide variety of outdoor activities. Hiking is good with marked trails and several cabins to visit. Fishing can be done in the rivers Folla, Einunna, or Glomma. The opportunities for hunting in the area are also good.

== Notable people ==
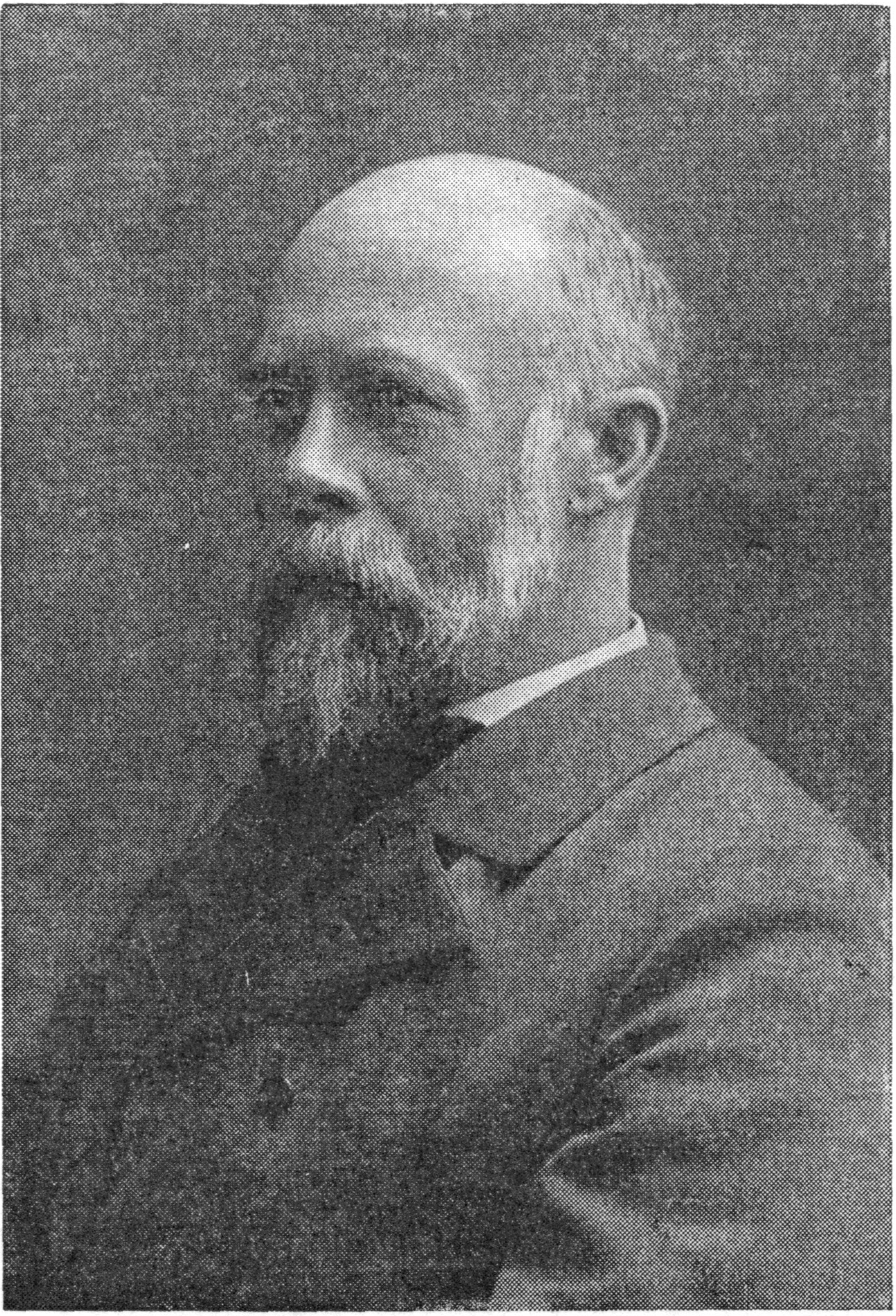
Ivar Mortensson Egnund, 1924

- Ivar Mortensson-Egnund (1857–1934), an author, journalist, theologian, researcher, translator, writer, philosopher, and advocate of nynorsk who lived at Einabu in Folldal from 1894
- Olav Dalgard (1898 in Folldal – 1980), a literary and art historian, filmmaker, author, and educator
- Tore Segelcke (1901–1979), an actress who spent many summers in Folldal after 1969
- Olav Odden (1914 in Folldal – 1969), a skier, competed in cross-country skiing and Nordic combined at the 1948 Winter Olympics
- Erling Brandsnes (born 1945 in Folldal), a Norwegian politician and mayor of Folldal from 1987-1999
- Hans Einar Krokan (born 1945 in Folldal), a physician and cancer researcher
- Svein Borkhus (born 1955 in Dalholen), a Norwegian politician and mayor of Alvdal Municipality from 1999-2007 and from 2011
