= Vatten (song) =

Song by Robert Broberg

from the album Kvinna eller man
- Language: Swedish
- Released: 1981
- Songwriter(s): Robert Broberg

"Vatten" ("Water") is a Swedish song about Stockholm by Robert Broberg, released in 1981 on his album Kvinna eller man. The lyrics includes places in Stockholm County, among them Café Opera, Karlberg, Stockholms skärgård, Djurgårdsfärjan, Haga slott and Lidingöbro.

The song charted at number 10 in Svensktoppen in May 1981.
