= McFadden =

McFadden may refer to:

== Fictional characters ==
- "Casper McFadden" (otherwise known as "Casper the Friendly Ghost")
- "McFadden" is also a name of a Prison Break character, James Whistler
- "Bart McFadden" is a character, known as a fictional head coach of the Atlanta Falcons in the book by Tim Green, Football Genius

== Other ==
- McFadden Act, American law
- McFadden and Whitehead, American songwriting, production, and recording duo
- Macfadden Publishing
- Macfadden's Fiction Lover's Magazine, short-lived successor name for Metropolitan magazine in 1920s

== See also ==
- McFadyen (disambiguation)
- MacFadyen
