= Fatenah =

2009 Palestinian film

- Directed by: Ahmad Habash
- Written by: Ahmad Habash
- Produced by: Saed Andoni
- Release date: 2009
- Running time: 30 minutes
- Country: Palestinian territories

Fatenah is the first 3D animated film made in the Palestinian territories.

== Plot ==
Fatenah revolves around the main character, a young adult living in Palestine. While conducting a self-examination she discovers a lump. The story evolves around her attempt to get medical attention for the lump while living in the Palestinian territories.

== Production ==
The film uses real photographs of the region as background images, bringing additional realism.
