= Lars Vatten =

Norwegian cancer researcher

Lars Johan Vatten
- Born: 20 August 1952; Trondheim, Norway
- Died: 14 July 2025 (aged 73); Lillehammer, Norway
- Known for: Contribution to cancer and perinatal epidemiology
- Scientific career
- Fields: Epidemiology
- Institutions: Norwegian University of Science and Technology; International Prevention Research Institute

Lars Johan Vatten (20 August 1952 - 14 July 2025) was a Norwegian epidemiologist. He did research on cancer, perinatal and cardiovascular epidemiology.

== Biography ==
Vatten was born in Trondheim, Norway, studied medicine at the University of Tromsø (he was made MD in 1980) and received a Master of Public Health in 1988 from the University of North Carolina. Two years later the University of Trondheim awarded him a PhD.

He initially worked for his internship at the Molde County Hospital from 1980 to 1981 and Sunndal Municipality from 1981 to 1982. After serving at the Royal Norwegian Navy he became a family doctor at the University of Trondheim from 1983 to 1986. After a year of training in occupational medicine he joined the Norwegian Cancer Society as a research fellow 1987-1990. From 1990 to 1996 he worked at the Norwegian Research Council.

From 1996, he was professor and chair of the Epidemiology Department at the Norwegian University of Science and Technology in Trondheim. In 1997–2002 he was adjunct lecturer in cancer epidemiology at the Harvard School of Public Health in Boston. He also was professor in epidemiology at the University of Bergen, Norway, 2002–2003 and from 2007 to 2008 he was a senior research fellow at the International Agency for Research on Cancer, Lyon, France. Since 2008 he held an honorary professorship at Bristol University and was a visiting scientist of the Harvard School of Public Health (now Harvard T.H. Chan School of Public Health) from 2009. From 2010 Lars Vatten was also a senior research fellow of the International Prevention Research Institute, Lyon.

== Scientific merits ==
Vatten's specific field of research was epidemiological research. He contributed to the fields of cancer, perinatal and cardiovascular epidemiology. He published more than 200 articles in scientific journals and is co-author of some books.

Lars Vatten was a member of The Royal Norwegian Society of Sciences and Letters.

In 2010 he received King Olav V's Prize for Cancer Research from the Norwegian Cancer Society.
