= Ross Macfadyen =

Scottish broadcaster

Ross Macfadyen is a Scottish media, broadcast and communications professional currently working in the charity sector.

== Career ==
Born in Glasgow, he started his professional broadcasting career with East End Radio, before joining Radio Clyde, where he was an on-air presenter, and became head of music for Clyde 1, Programme Controller for Radio Clyde, and then director of programmes for Radio Clyde, Clyde 1 and Clyde 2. He left Radio Clyde in October 2005 and joined Real Radio, part of the Guardian Media Group. He has also been a regular stand-in presenter on Get It On for BBC Radio Scotland.

As well as his on-air work, Macfadyen was content services senior manager for "RNIB Solutions" and ran RNIB Connect Radio [Insight Radio], the radio division of the Royal National Institute of Blind People (RNIB), with a network of radio studios across the UK producing programming by and for blind and partially sighted people targeted at the 2 million people living with sight loss in the UK. RNIB Connect Radio [Insight Radio] broadcasts across the UK online, on digital TV and FM, and creates opportunities for blind and partially sighted people who want to work in media. Within six months of launching, Insight Radio was a winner at the Sony Radio Academy Awards and has picked up several other awards – New York Radio Festival, Freesat TV Awards]. In July 2015 Macfadyen took up a six-month "acting" role as head of services for RNIB Solutions taking on added responsibility for the reading and library services of the organization. In November 2015 Macfadyen moved into the promoted role of director, RNIB Scotland, on an interim basis. He was responsible for the entire RNIB operation in Scotland whilst maintaining elements of his existing role within RNIB Solutions Services. RNIB Connect Radio [Insight Radio] is now the most effective means of reaching blind and partially sighted people across the UK with a weekly reach of over 30% The remit for RNIB involved leading the teams behind RNIB Connect Radio [Insight Radio], Talking Books, Talking Newspapers and Magazines and generally anything which transfers into audio. "Teams of brilliant people creating more content for more people every day"

In March 2016, Macfadyen moved into the role managing editor, group media, with responsibility for the content creation teams across the UK in RNIB Group.

In May 2017, Macfadyen left RNIB to take up the role of Director, Media Marketing & Communication with International Disability Charity Leonard Cheshire. He moved to Bipolar Scotland in August 2021 to lead the communications function of the charity and left six months later to take up his current position. In May 2022, Ross Macfadyen was appointed the first ever Chief Executive of Scottish dog welfare charity Dog Aid Society of Scotland.

== Personal life ==
Macfadyen was a board director of Radio Clyde and served as a director of the Hansel Foundation in Ayr from 2006 to 2012. He was appointed to the board of the British Wireless for the Blind Fund in October 2012.
