= Phaeton =

Phaeton, Phaethon, Foeton, or Foethon may refer to:

== Greek mythology ==
- Phaethon, son of Helios, personification of the Sun
- Phaethon of Syria, guardian of the temples of Aphrodite
- Phaethon, one of the horses of Eos

== Astronomy ==
- 3200 Phaethon, a small asteroid or comet responsible for the Geminids meteor shower
- Phaeton (hypothetical planet), possibly destroyed to form the asteroid belt
- Phaethontis quadrangle, a region on Mars
- Foethon, an archaic Greek name for the planet Jupiter

== Art ==
- Phaëton (Lully), a tragédie lyrique by Jean Baptiste Lully
- Phaéton (Saint-Saëns), a 1873 composition by Camille Saint-Saëns
- Phaethon (composition), a 1986 composition by Christopher Rouse
- The Fall of Phaeton (Rubens), a painting by Peter Paul Rubens
- Phaethon (play), a lost play by Euripides

== Vehicles ==
- Phaeton body, a style of open carriage or automobile
- Phaeton (carriage), a horse-drawn sporty open carriage
- Volkswagen Phaeton, a full-size luxury automobile built by Volkswagen until 2016
- Phaethon (patrol boat), a patrol boat of the Navy of Cyprus
- HMS Phaeton (1782), a frigate of Britain's Royal Navy

== Other uses ==
- Gary Phaeton (born 1985), French basketball player
- Phaethon, first king of the Bronze Age Molossians
- Dark photon, also called phaeton, a hypothetical dark matter particle
- Phaethon, genus name of the three tropicbird species
- Phaeton, Haiti, an old factory town
- Phaethon (roller coaster), a steel inverted roller coaster at Gyeongju World in South Korea
- Phaéton (trotter horse), an Anglo-Norman trotting horse
- Phaethon, an alias for the main protagonists of Zenless Zone Zero
