= MacFadyen =

MacFadyen (also written Macfadyen) is a Scottish and Irish patronymic surname meaning "son of little Patrick". The Celtic prefix "Mac" means "son of", while "Fadyen" is a derivative of the Scottish Gaelic Phaid(e)in or Irish Pháidín, meaning "little Patrick". It is a variant of the surname McFadden, which has other variants.

Notable people with the surname include:

- Allan Macfadyen (1860–1907), Scottish bacteriologist
- Angus Macfadyen (born 1963), Scottish actor
- Christie MacFadyen, Canadian actress
- Donnie Macfadyen (born 1979), Scottish rugby player
- Donald Macfadyen, Lord Macfadyen (1945–2008), Scottish lawyer and judge
- Elmer MacFadyen (1943–2007), Canadian politician
- Eric Macfadyen (1879-1966), English colonial administrator
- Gavin MacFadyen (1940–2016), American investigative journalist
- Ian Macfadyen, (born 1942), British retired Air Marshal
- Matthew Macfadyen (born 1974), English actor
- Ross Macfadyen, Scottish broadcast professional
- Willie MacFadyen (1904–1971), Scottish football player and manager

== See also ==
- McFadden (surname)
- McFadyen (surname)
