= Norwegian Cancer Society =

Non-profit cancer research society

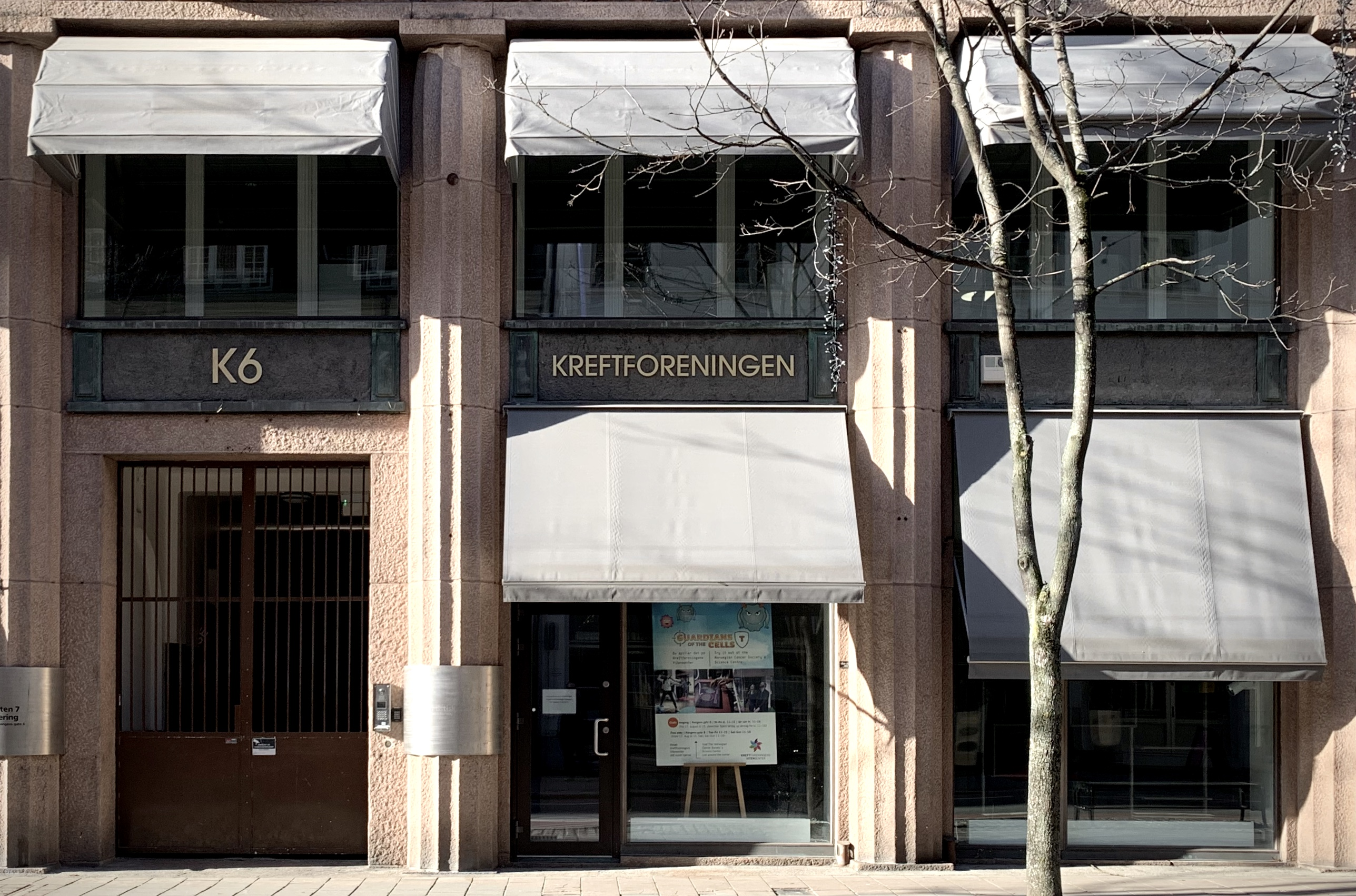
- Entrance to Kreftforeningen, Kongens gate in Oslo, Norway
- Formation: 1938
- Location: Norway
- Key people: Anne Lise Ryel (secretary general); Gunn-Elin Aasprong Bjørneboe (chair person); Carl Otto Løvenskiold (deputy chair person)
- Website: kreftforeningen.no/en/

The Norwegian Cancer Society (Norwegian: Kreftforeningen) is a non-profitmaking organisation in Norway.

== History ==
It was established as Norsk Forening til Kreftens Bekjempelse in 1938, and took the current name when it merged with Landsforeningen mot Kreft in 1948. Its purpose is to help patients with cancer, increase awareness of cancer and to fund cancer research. The society funds the annual King Olav V's Prize for Cancer Research.

== Organizational structure ==
The Secretary general is Ingrid Stenstadvold Ross. The organizational headquarters are in Kongens gate 6 in Oslo.
