= Midtronden =

Mountain in Dovre, Norway

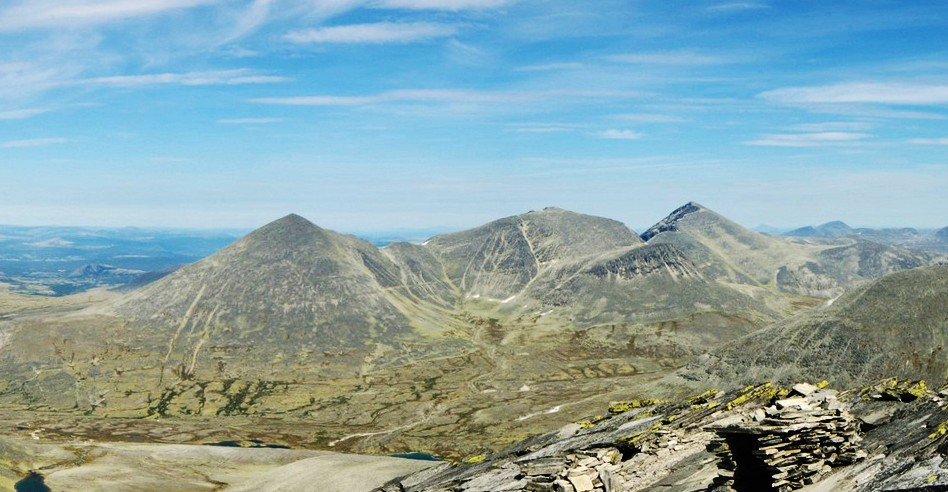
- Midtronden in the centre. Digerronden to the left and Høgronden to the right. Seen from Veslesmeden.

Highest point
- Elevation: 2,060 m (6,760 ft)
- Prominence: 284 m (932 ft)
- Parent peak: Høgronden
- Isolation: 2.1 km (1.3 mi) to Høgronden
- Coordinates: 61°56′40″N 9°51′29″E

Geography
- Interactive map of the mountain
- Location: Innlandet, Norway
- Parent range: Rondane
- Topo map: 1718 I Rondane

Midtronden is a mountain in Dovre Municipality in Innlandet county, Norway. The 2,060-metre (6,760 ft) tall mountain is located in the Rondane mountains and inside the Rondane National Park, about 25 kilometres (16 mi) northeast of the town of Otta and about 40 kilometres (25 mi) southeast of the village of Dombås. The mountain is surrounded by several other notable mountains including Høgronden to the east; Rondeslottet to the south; Veslesmeden, Storsmeden, Sagtindene, and Trolltinden to the southwest; Gråhøe and Vassberget to the west; and Digerronden and Stygghøin to the northwest.

The mountain has two peaks. The western peak is the highest, 2,060 metres (6,760 ft) and the eastern peak is 2,042 metres (6,699 ft) with a primary factor of 90 metres (300 ft).

== Name ==
The first element is midt which means "middle" or "the one in the middle". The last part of the name is -ronden which is the finite plural of the word rond. Several mountains in the area have the ending -ronden (Digerronden, Høgronden, Midtronden, Storronden and Vinjeronden), and this is the finite singular of the same word. The word rond was probably originally the name of the long and narrow lake such as Rondvatnet and the mountains surrounding the lake were then named after this lake.

== See also ==
- List of mountains of Norway
