= Digerronden =

Mountain in Dovre, Norway

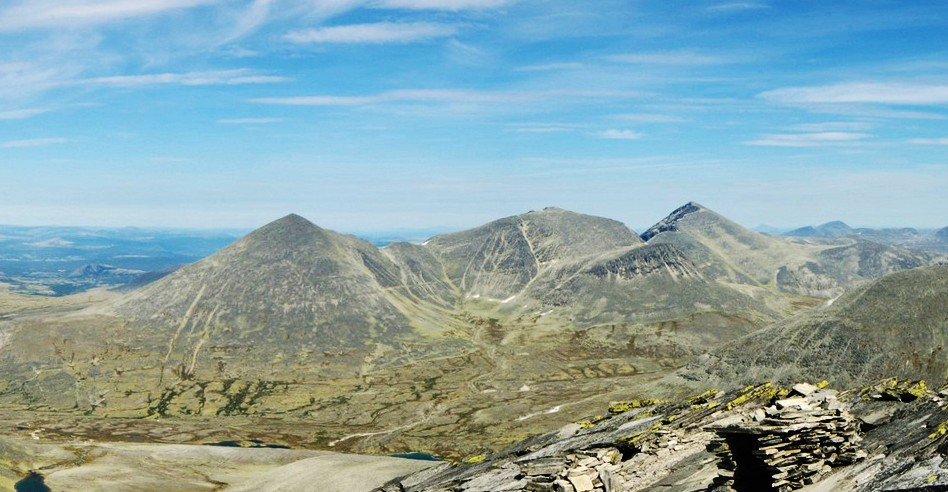
- Digerronden to the left. Midtronden in the centre and Høgronden to the right.

Highest point
- Elevation: 2,015 m (6,611 ft)
- Prominence: 190 m (620 ft)
- Parent peak: Midtronden
- Isolation: 1.4 km (0.87 mi)
- Coordinates: 61°57′06″N 9°49′52″E

Geography
- Interactive map of the mountain
- Location: Innlandet, Norway
- Parent range: Rondane
- Topo map: 1718 I Rondane

Digerronden is a mountain in Dovre Municipality in Innlandet county, Norway. The 2,015-metre (6,611 ft) tall mountain is located in the Rondane mountains and inside the Rondane National Park. It is one of the ten mountains in the park that are over 2,000 metres (6,600 ft) in elevation. The mountain has a characteristic pyramidal shape and it is located about 24 kilometres (15 mi) northeast of the town of Otta and about 40 kilometres (25 mi) southeast of the village of Dombås. The mountain is surrounded by several other notable mountains including Midtronden and Høgronden to the east; Rondeslottet to the south; Veslesmeden, Storsmeden, Sagtindene, and Trolltinden to the southwest; Gråhøe and Vassberget to the west; and Stygghøin to the northwest.

== Name ==
The first element is diger which means "huge" or "enormous". The last part of the name is -ronden which is the finite plural of the word rond. Several mountains in the area have the ending -ronden (Digerronden, Høgronden, Midtronden, Storronden and Vinjeronden), and this is the finite singular of the same word. The word rond was probably originally the name of the long and narrow lake such as Rondvatnet and the mountains surrounding the lake were then named after this lake.

== See also ==
- List of mountains in Norway by height
- List of mountains of Norway
