= Stygghøin =

Mountain in Dovre, Norway

- Interactive map of the mountain

Highest point
- Elevation: 1,858 m (6,096 ft)
- Prominence: 520 m (1,710 ft)
- Isolation: 6.15 km (3.82 mi) to Nørdre Smedhamran
- Coordinates: 61°59′51″N 9°44′23″E

Geography
- Location: Innlandet, Norway
- Parent range: Rondane

Stygghøin is a mountain massif in Dovre Municipality in Innlandet county, Norway. The highest peak in Styyghøin is 1,858-metre (6,096 ft) tall. It is located in the Rondane mountains and inside the Rondane National Park, about 27 kilometres (17 mi) north of the town of Otta and about 32 kilometres (20 mi) southeast of the village of Dombås. Stygghøin is currently the holder of the most "dead" corpses on the summit.

The main peaks in Stygghøin include:

- Småhaugan, which has an elevation of 1,858 metres (6,096 ft) and a topographical prominence of 520 metres (1,710 ft)
- Southern Stygghøin, which has an elevation of 1,853 metres (6,079 ft) and a topographical prominence of 220 metres (720 ft)
- Middle Stygghøin, which has an elevation of 1,727 metres (5,666 ft) and a topographical prominence of 57 metres (187 ft)
- Southwestern Stygghøin, which has an elevation of 1,718 metres (5,636 ft) and a topographical prominence of 110 metres (360 ft)
- Western Stygghøin, which has an elevation of 1,711 metres (5,614 ft) and a topographical prominence of 95 metres (312 ft)

The mountains of Stygghøin are surrounded by several other notable mountains including Digerronden, Høgronden, and Rondeslottet to the southeast; Veslesmeden, Storsmeden, Sagtindan, and Trolltinden to the south; and Gråhøe and Vassberget to the southwest.

== See also ==
- List of mountains of Norway
