= Simlepiggen =

Mountain in Innlandet, Norway

- Interactive map of the mountain

Highest point
- Elevation: 1,724 m (5,656 ft)
- Prominence: 444 m (1,457 ft)
- Parent peak: Rondslottet
- Isolation: 2.2 km (1.4 mi)
- Coordinates: 61°51′51″N 9°50′42″E

Geography
- Location: Innlandet, Norway
- Parent range: Rondane
- Topo map: 1718 I Rondane

Simlepiggen is a mountain in Sel Municipality in Innlandet county, Norway. The 1,724-metre (5,656 ft) tall mountain is located in the Rondane mountains within Rondane National Park. The mountain sits about 20 kilometres (12 mi) northeast of the town of Otta. The mountain is surrounded by several other notable mountains including Hornflågene to the southeast, Veslsvulten and Rondvasshøgde to the northeast, Storronden and Vinjeronden to the north, and Svartnuten to the northwest.

== See also ==
- List of mountains of Norway by height
