= Steet =

Mountain in Innlandet, Norway

- Interactive map of the mountain

Highest point
- Elevation: 1,798 m (5,899 ft)
- Prominence: 190 m (620 ft)
- Parent peak: Trolltinden
- Isolation: 0.416 km (0.258 mi) to Storsmeden
- Coordinates: 61°53′53″N 9°43′55″E

Geography
- Location: Innlandet, Norway
- Parent range: Rondane
- Topo map: 1718 I Rondane

Steet is a mountain in Sel Municipality in Innlandet county, Norway. The 1,798-metre (5,899 ft) tall mountain is located in the Rondane mountains within Rondane National Park. The mountain sits about 20 kilometres (12 mi) northeast of the town of Otta. The mountain is surrounded by several other notable mountains including Hoggbeitet, Ljosåbelgen, and Smiukampen to the southwest; Smiubelgin and Trolltinden to the northwest; Storsmeden and Veslesmeden to the north; and Svartnuten to the east.

== See also ==
- List of mountains of Norway by height
