= Hoggbeitet =

Mountain in Innlandet, Norway

- Interactive map of the mountain

Highest point
- Elevation: 1,805 m (5,922 ft)
- Prominence: 58 m (190 ft)
- Parent peak: Trolltinden
- Isolation: 0.542 km (0.337 mi)
- Coordinates: 61°53′43″N 9°42′45″E

Geography
- Location: Innlandet, Norway
- Parent range: Rondane
- Topo map: 1718 I Rondane

Hoggbeitet is a mountain in Sel Municipality in Innlandet county, Norway. The 1,805-metre (5,922 ft) tall mountain is located in the Rondane mountains within Rondane National Park. The mountain sits about 20 kilometres (12 mi) northeast of the town of Otta. The mountain is surrounded by several other notable mountains including Sagtindan and Indre Bråkdalshøe to the northwest, Bråkdalsbelgen to the west, Smiukampen and Ljosåbelgen to the southwest, Storsmeden and Steet to the northeast, and Trolltinden to the north.

== See also ==
- List of mountains of Norway by height
