= Svartnuten =

Mountain in Innlandet, Norway

- Interactive map of the mountain

Highest point
- Elevation: 1,844 m (6,050 ft)
- Prominence: 84 m (276 ft)
- Parent peak: Rondeslottet
- Isolation: 0.811 km (0.504 mi)
- Coordinates: 61°54′01″N 9°49′16″E

Geography
- Location: Innlandet, Norway
- Parent range: Rondane
- Topo map: 1718 I Rondane

Svartnuten is a mountain in Sel Municipality in Innlandet county, Norway. The 1,844-metre (6,050 ft) tall mountain is located in the Rondane mountains within Rondane National Park. The mountain sits about 20 kilometres (12 mi) northeast of the town of Otta. The mountain is surrounded by several other notable mountains including Vinjeronden and Rondeslottet to the northeast, Storronden and Rondvasshøgde to the east, Simlepiggen to the southeast, Steet and Hoggbeitet to the west, and Veslesmeden to the northwest.

== See also ==
- List of mountains of Norway by height
