= Smiukampen =

Mountain in Innlandet, Norway

- Interactive map of the mountain

Highest point
- Elevation: 1,799 m (5,902 ft)
- Prominence: 71 m (233 ft)
- Parent peak: Trolltinden
- Isolation: 0.711 km (0.442 mi)
- Coordinates: 61°52′55″N 9°40′50″E

Geography
- Location: Innlandet, Norway
- Parent range: Rondane
- Topo map: 1718 I Rondane

Smiukampen is a mountain in Sel Municipality in Innlandet county, Norway. The 1,799-metre (5,902 ft) tall mountain is located in the Rondane mountains within Rondane National Park. The mountain sits about 20 kilometres (12 mi) northeast of the town of Otta. The mountain is surrounded by several other notable mountains including Bråkdalsbelgen, Sagtindan, and Indre Bråkdalshøe to the northwest; and Ljosåbelgen, Hoggbeitet, and Smiubelgen to the northeast.

== See also ==
- List of mountains of Norway by height
