= Høgronden =

Mountain in Norway

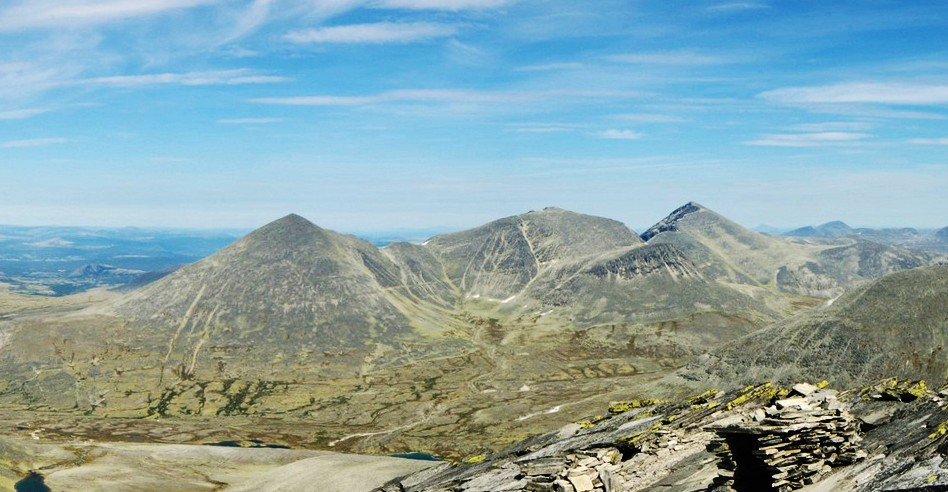
- Digerronden, Midtronden, and Høgronden seen from Veslesmeden

Highest point
- Elevation: 2,114 m (6,936 ft)
- Prominence: 698 m (2,290 ft)
- Isolation: 4 km (2.5 mi)
- Listing: #3 in Rondane National Park
- Coordinates: 61°56′40″N 9°54′01″E

Geography
- Location within Innlandet Location within Norway
- Location: Innlandet, Norway
- Parent range: Rondane
- Topo map: 1718 I Rondane

Høgronden is a mountain in Folldal Municipality in Innlandet county, Norway. The 2,114-metre (6,936 ft) tall mountain lies inside Rondane National Park in the northeastern part of the Rondane mountain range. The mountain lies east of Midtronden and Digerronden, northeast of Rondeslottet and Vinjeronden, north of Rondvasshøgde, and northwest of Veslsvulten. Norwegian County Road 27 passes by the mountain to the east.

== Name ==
The first element is høg which means 'high' or 'tall'. The last part of the name comes from the word rond which was probably the original name of the nearby lake Rondvatnet. Many of the mountains near the lake were then named after this lake. The Old Norse form of the name was rǫnd which means 'stripe' or 'edge' (referring to the long and narrow form of the lake).

== See also ==
- List of mountains of Norway
