= Storsmeden =

Mountain in Dovre, Norway

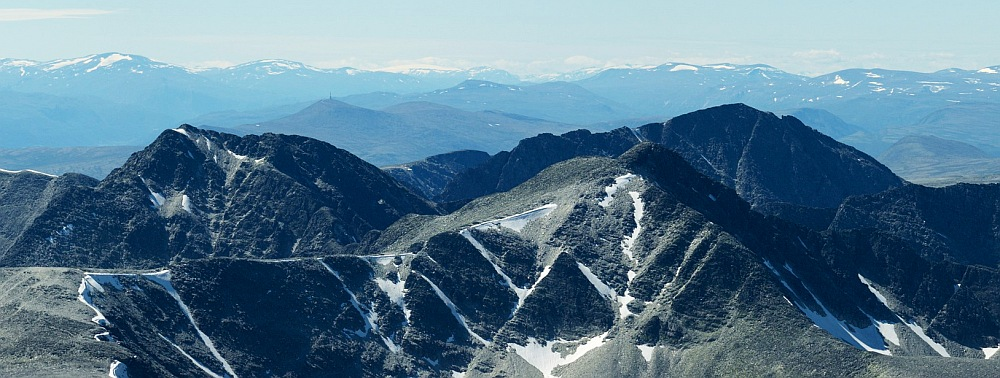
- Seen from Rondeslottet. Storsmeden to the left and Trolltinden in the back. Veslesmeden is the right summit of the frontmost ridge.

Highest point
- Elevation: 2,016 m (6,614 ft)
- Prominence: 275 m (902 ft)
- Parent peak: Trolltinden
- Isolation: 2 km (1.2 mi)
- Coordinates: 61°54′34″N 9°44′22″E

Geography
- Interactive map of the mountain
- Location: Innlandet, Norway
- Parent range: Rondane
- Topo map: 1718 I Rondane

Storsmeden is a mountain on the border of Dovre Municipality and Sel Municipality in Innlandet county, Norway. The 2,016-metre (6,614 ft) tall mountain is located in the Rondane mountains and inside the Rondane National Park, about 17 kilometres (11 mi) northeast of the town of Otta and about 37 kilometres (23 mi) southeast of the village of Dombås. The mountain is part of a group of mountains called Smiubelgin. It is surrounded by several other notable mountains including Digerronden, Veslesmeden, and Høgronden to the northeast, Rondeslottet to the east, Ljosåbelgen and Bråkdalsbelgen to the south, Sagtindan and Trolltinden to the west; Gråhøe and Vassberget to the northwest; and Stygghøin to the north.

The mountain is easiest to access on its western ridge. Experienced hikers may access it via Veslesmeden by scrambling the eastern ridge.

== Name ==
The meaning of the name is "the big blacksmith".

== See also ==
- List of mountains of Norway
