= Halvfarhøe =

Mountain in Dovre, Norway

- Interactive map of the mountain

Highest point
- Elevation: 1,687 m (5,535 ft)
- Prominence: 247 m (810 ft)
- Parent peak: Storhøe
- Isolation: 4.6 km (2.9 mi) to Fokstuguhøe
- Coordinates: 62°06′06″N 9°28′23″E

Geography
- Location: Innlandet, Norway
- Parent range: Dovrefjell

Halvfarhøe is a mountain in Dovre Municipality in Innlandet county, Norway. The 1,687-metre (5,535 ft) tall mountain is located in the Dovrefjell mountains and inside the Dovre National Park, about 18 kilometres (11 mi) northeast of the village of Dombås. The mountain is surrounded by several other notable mountains including Gråhøe to the east, Falketind and Blåberget to the north, and Storhøe and Fokstuguhøe to the west.

== See also ==
- List of mountains of Norway
