= Smiubelgin =

Mountain range in Norway

- Smiubæljin / Smiubelgen (historic)
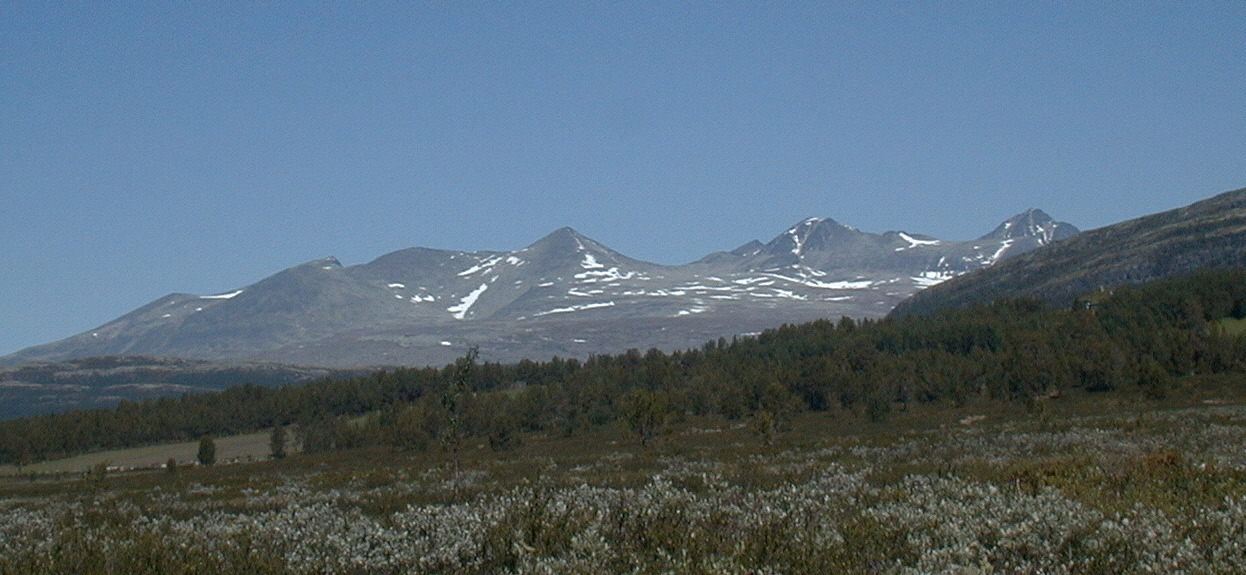
- Smiubelgen seen from the south

Highest point
- Peak: Trolltinden, Dovre, Innlandet
- Elevation: 2,018 m (6,621 ft)
- Prominence: 778 m (2,552 ft)
- Isolation: 2.6 km (1.6 mi)
- Coordinates: 61.919137°N 9.707728°E

Geography
- Location: Innlandet, Norway
- Range coordinates: 61.898°N 9.705°E
- Parent range: Rondane

Smiubelgin is a mountain range in Innlandet county, Norway. It is located in the western part of Rondane National Park, separated from the eastern part by the lake Rondvatnet. The Smiubelgen mountains have sharper ridges than the eastern part of Rondane. The mountain range is located along the border between Sel Municipality and Dovre Municipality.

The meaning of the name is 'the blacksmith's bellows'. (See also Storsmeden and Veslesmeden.)

Mountains in the Smiubelgen area include:

- Trolltinden 2,018 metres (6,621 ft) (earlier Sagtinden)
- Storsmeden 2,016 m (6,614 ft)
- Veslesmeden 2,015 m (6,611 ft)
- Steet 1,996 m (6,549 ft)
- Ljosåbelgen 1,948 m (6,391 ft)
- Bråkedalsbelgen 1,915 m (6,283 ft)

== See also ==
- List of mountains of Norway
