= Fokstuguhøe =

Mountain in Dovre, Norway

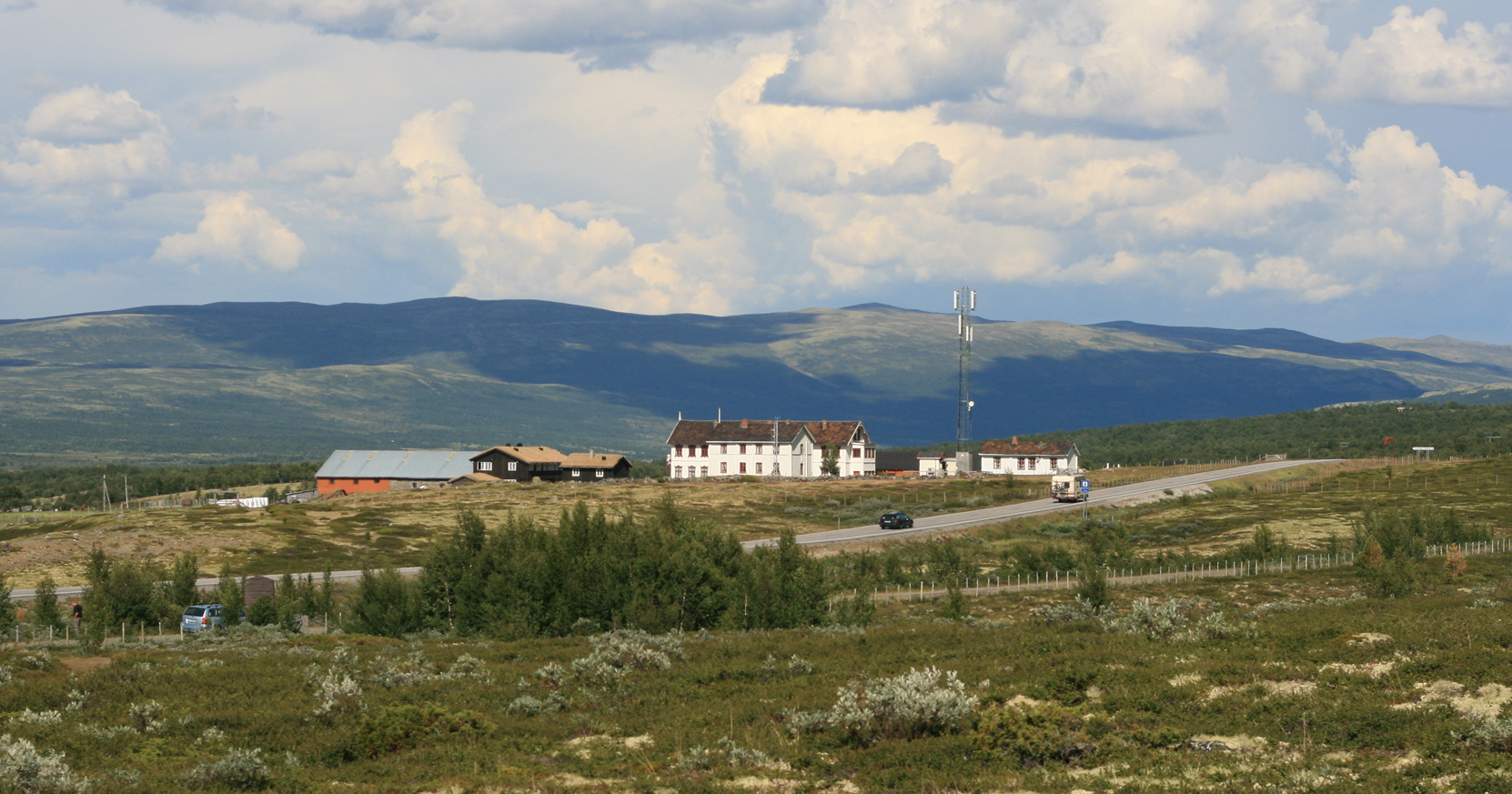
- View of Fokstuguhøi and the mountain lodge

Highest point
- Elevation: 1,600 m (5,200 ft)
- Prominence: 43 m (141 ft)
- Parent peak: Storhøe
- Isolation: 1.2 km (0.75 mi)
- Coordinates: 62°05′06″N 9°20′51″E

Geography
- Interactive map of the mountain
- Location: Innlandet, Norway
- Parent range: Dovrefjell

Fokstuguhøe is a mountain in Dovre Municipality in Innlandet county, Norway. The 1,600-metre (5,200 ft) tall mountain is located in the Dovrefjell mountains and inside the Dovre National Park, about 12 kilometres (7.5 mi) east of the village of Dombås. The mountain is surrounded by several other notable mountains including Storhøe to the east, Halvfarhøe and Gråhøe to the northeast, and Falketind and Blåberget to the north-northeast.

== Climate ==
The village of Fokstugu sits at an elevation of 973 metres (3,192 ft) above sea level. The climate around the village is borderline Subarctic climate (Dfc). Although the wet season is in summer, the driest time of year is in late spring. An extra 3 millimetres (0.12 in) in October would give it 3 times the precipitation of April. This would make Fokstugu a Subarctic climate (Dsc). The warmest month, July, has an average of only 10.2 °C (50.4 °F) making it on the border with a tundra climate (Et).

Climate data for Fokstugu 1991-2020 (973 m / 3192 ft ASL)
Month	Jan	Feb	Mar	Apr	May	Jun	Jul	Aug	Sep	Oct	Nov	Dec	Year
Mean daily maximum °C (°F)	−3.9 (25.0)	−3.9 (25.0)	−1.3 (29.7)	3.2 (37.8)	8.5 (47.3)	13.1 (55.6)	16 (61)	14.5 (58.1)	10 (50)	3.8 (38.8)	−1.1 (30.0)	−3.4 (25.9)	4.6 (40.4)
Daily mean °C (°F)	−6.5 (20.3)	−6.8 (19.8)	−4.8 (23.4)	−0.6 (30.9)	4.1 (39.4)	8.3 (46.9)	11.1 (52.0)	9.9 (49.8)	6 (43)	0.6 (33.1)	−3.8 (25.2)	−6 (21)	1.0 (33.7)
Mean daily minimum °C (°F)	−10.1 (13.8)	−10.3 (13.5)	−8.5 (16.7)	−4.4 (24.1)	−0.3 (31.5)	3.6 (38.5)	6.5 (43.7)	5.9 (42.6)	2.5 (36.5)	−2.6 (27.3)	−7 (19)	−9.6 (14.7)	−2.9 (26.8)
Source 1: seklima.met.no
Source 2: NOAA / WMO averages 91-2020 Norway

Climate data for Fokstugu 1961-1990, extremes 1965-2011
Month	Jan	Feb	Mar	Apr	May	Jun	Jul	Aug	Sep	Oct	Nov	Dec	Year
Record high °C (°F)	8.8 (47.8)	8.1 (46.6)	8.9 (48.0)	15.2 (59.4)	22.0 (71.6)	25.4 (77.7)	26.8 (80.2)	26.8 (80.2)	22.5 (72.5)	18.3 (64.9)	11.4 (52.5)	6.4 (43.5)	26.8 (80.2)
Mean daily maximum °C (°F)	−5.5 (22.1)	−5.0 (23.0)	−2.3 (27.9)	1.4 (34.5)	8.6 (47.5)	13.4 (56.1)	14.8 (58.6)	13.7 (56.7)	8.3 (46.9)	3.7 (38.7)	−2.1 (28.2)	−3.9 (25.0)	3.8 (38.8)
Mean daily minimum °C (°F)	−11.7 (10.9)	−11.5 (11.3)	−9.3 (15.3)	−5.7 (21.7)	0.3 (32.5)	4.0 (39.2)	5.7 (42.3)	5.2 (41.4)	1.3 (34.3)	−2.1 (28.2)	−7.8 (18.0)	−10.2 (13.6)	−3.5 (25.7)
Record low °C (°F)	−32.4 (−26.3)	−29.2 (−20.6)	−24.8 (−12.6)	−17.3 (0.9)	−12.5 (9.5)	−6.0 (21.2)	−2.9 (26.8)	−5.7 (21.7)	−9.5 (14.9)	−16.0 (3.2)	−23.5 (−10.3)	−29.5 (−21.1)	−32.4 (−26.3)
Average precipitation mm (inches)	28 (1.1)	24 (0.9)	23 (0.9)	14 (0.6)	26 (1.0)	54 (2.1)	68 (2.7)	58 (2.3)	42 (1.7)	39 (1.5)	29 (1.1)	30 (1.2)	435 (17.1)
Average precipitation days	8.9	6.1	6.5	5.0	6.0	9.6	10.8	10.0	9.1	7.9	8.1	8.6	96.6
Source: Met Norway Eklima

== See also ==
- List of mountains of Norway
