= Hornflågan =

Mountain in Innlandet, Norway

- Interactive map of the mountain

Highest point
- Elevation: 1,650 m (5,410 ft)
- Prominence: 453 m (1,486 ft)
- Parent peak: Rondeslottet
- Isolation: 6 km (3.7 mi)
- Coordinates: 61°49′44″N 9°58′58″E

Geography
- Location: Innlandet, Norway
- Parent range: Rondane

Hornflågan is a mountain in Nord-Fron Municipality in Innlandet county, Norway. The 1,650-metre (5,410 ft) tall mountain is located in the Rondane mountains within Rondane National Park. The mountain sits about 30 kilometres (19 mi) northeast of the town of Vinstra. The mountain is surrounded by several other notable mountains including Geitsida to the northeast, Veslsvulten to the north, and Rondvasshøgde, Simlepiggen, and Storronden to the northwest.

== See also ==
- List of mountains of Norway by height
