= Blåberget =

Mountain in Dovre, Norway

- Interactive map of the mountain

Highest point
- Elevation: 1,665 m (5,463 ft)
- Prominence: 67 m (220 ft)
- Parent peak: Falketind
- Isolation: 1.2 km (0.75 mi)
- Coordinates: 62°08′28″N 9°26′14″E

Geography
- Location: Innlandet, Norway
- Parent range: Dovrefjell

Blåberget is a mountain in Dovre Municipality in Innlandet county, Norway. The 1,665-metre (5,463 ft) tall mountain is located in the Dovrefjell mountains and inside the Dovre National Park, about 17 kilometres (11 mi) northeast of the village of Dombås. The mountain is surrounded by several other notable mountains including Gråhøe to the southeast, Falketind and Halvfarhøe to the south, and Storhøe and Fokstuguhøe to the southwest.

== See also ==
- List of mountains of Norway
