= Falketind (Dovre) =

Mountain in Dovre, Norway

- Interactive map of the mountain

Highest point
- Elevation: 1,684 m (5,525 ft)
- Prominence: 223 m (732 ft)
- Isolation: 3.4 km (2.1 mi) to Halvfarhøe
- Coordinates: 62°07′46″N 9°26′56″E

Geography
- Location: Innlandet, Norway
- Parent range: Dovrefjell

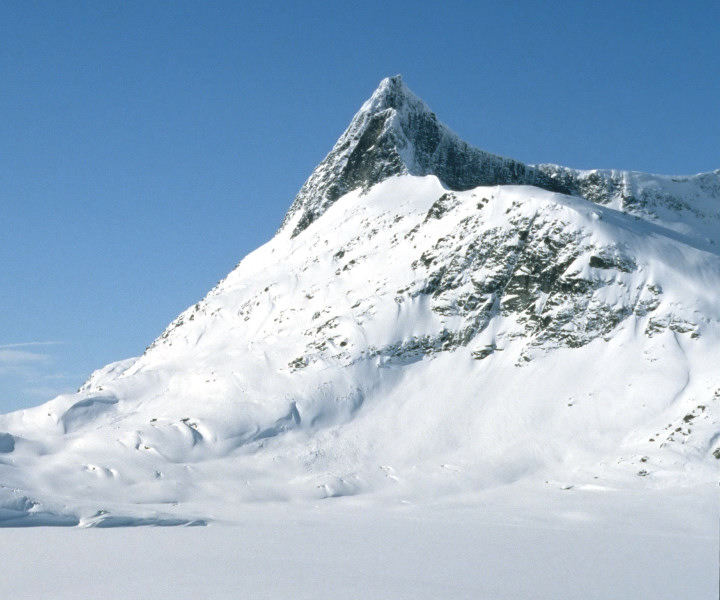
Falketind seen from east

Falketind is a mountain in Dovre Municipality in Innlandet county, Norway. The 1,684-metre (5,525 ft) tall mountain is located in the Dovrefjell mountains and inside the Dovre National Park, about 17 kilometres (11 mi) northeast of the village of Dombås. The mountain is surrounded by several other notable mountains including Blåberget to the north, Gråhøe to the southeast, Halvfarhøe to the south, and Storhøe and Fokstuguhøe to the southwest.

== See also ==
- List of mountains of Norway
