= Gråhøe =

Gråhøe (or its alternate spellings Gråhø, Gråhøi or Gråhøa) may refer to:

- Gråhøe (Dovre), a mountain in Dovre municipality in Innlandet county, Norway
- Gråhø (Lesja), a mountain in Lesja municipality in Innlandet county, Norway
- Gråhøe (Lom), a mountain in Lom municipality in Innlandet county, Norway
- Gråhø (Nord-Fron), a mountain in Nord-Fron municipality in Innlandet county, Norway
- Gråhøe (Sel), a mountain in Sel municipality in Innlandet county, Norway
- Gråhøi (Øystre Slidre), a mountain in Øystre Slidre municipality in Innlandet county, Norway
