= Storhøe (Fokstugu, Dovre) =

Mountain in Dovre, Norway

- Interactive map of the mountain

Highest point
- Elevation: 1,707 m (5,600 ft)
- Prominence: 588 m (1,929 ft)
- Isolation: 19.9 km (12.4 mi)
- Coordinates: 62°05′10″N 9°22′57″E

Geography
- Location: Innlandet, Norway
- Parent range: Dovrefjell

Storhøe is a mountain in Dovre Municipality in Innlandet county, Norway. The 1,707-metre (5,600 ft) tall mountain is the tallest mountain within the Dovre National Park. It is located in the Dovrefjell mountains, about 13 kilometres (8.1 mi) east of the village of Dombås. The mountain is surrounded by several other notable mountains including Gråhøe and Halvfarhøe to the northeast, Falketind and Blåberget to the north, and Fokstuguhøe to the west.

== See also ==
- List of mountains of Norway
