= Veslsvulten =

Mountain in Innlandet, Norway

- Veslesvulten
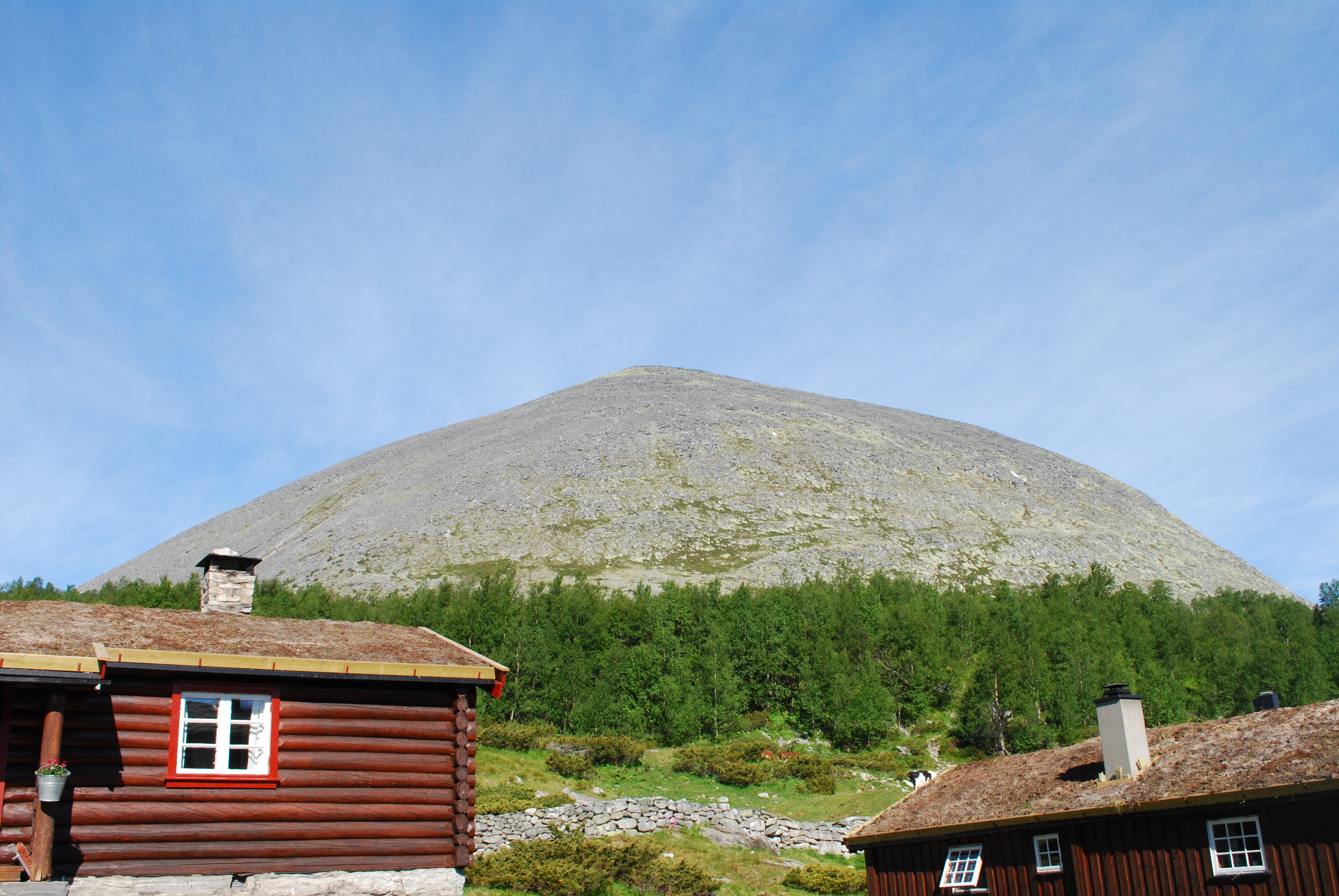
- Veslsvulten seen from Bjørnhollia

Highest point
- Elevation: 1,579 m (5,180 ft)
- Prominence: 94 metres (308 ft)
- Parent peak: Rondeslottet
- Isolation: 599 metres (1,965 ft)
- Coordinates: 61°53′27″N 9°58′52″E

Geography
- Interactive map of the mountain
- Location: Innlandet, Norway
- Parent range: Rondane
- Topo map: 1718 I Rondane

Veslsvulten is a mountain in Innlandet county, Norway. The 1,579-metre (5,180 ft) tall mountain lies along the border between Folldal Municipality and Sel Municipality. The mountain lies just inside the boundaries of Rondane National Park. It is located to the west of the mountains Rondvasshøgde, Vinjeronden, and Rondeslottet. The mountain Hornflågene lies to the southeast of this mountain. The Norwegian County Road 27 is located about 5 kilometres (3.1 mi) west of Veslsvutlen.

== See also ==
- List of mountains of Norway
