= Storronden =

Mountain in Innlandet, Norway

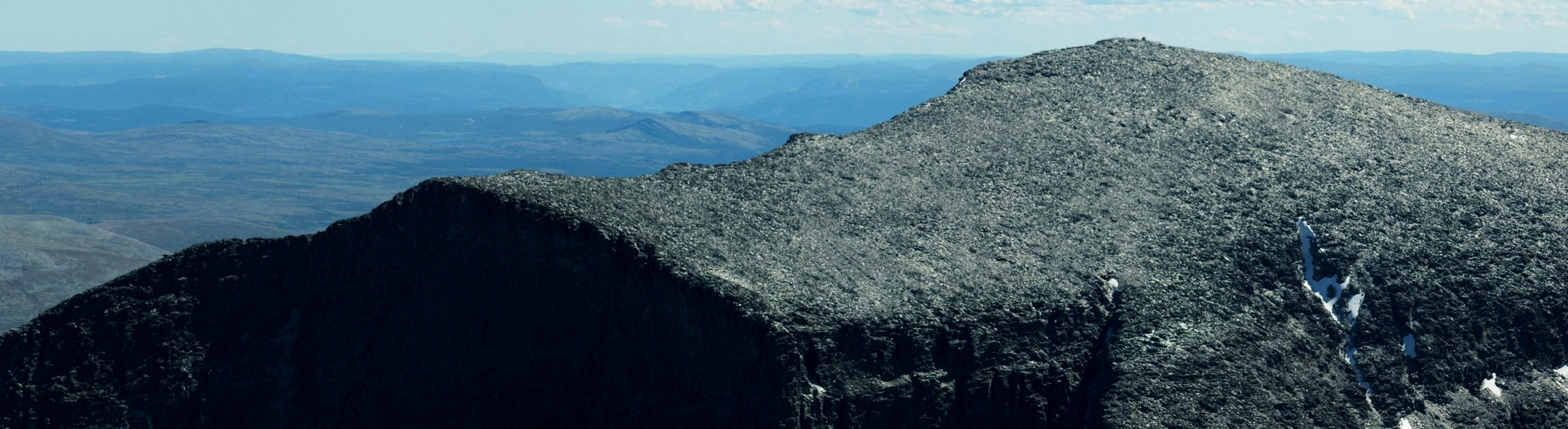
- Storronden seen from Rondeslottet

Highest point
- Elevation: 2,138 m (7,014 ft)
- Prominence: 388 m (1,273 ft)
- Parent peak: Rondeslottet
- Isolation: 2.4 km (1.5 mi) to Rondeslottet
- Coordinates: 61°53′30″N 9°51′44″E

Geography
- Interactive map of the mountain
- Location: Innlandet, Norway
- Parent range: Rondane
- Topo map: 1718 I Rondane

Storronden is a mountain in Sel Municipality in Innlandet county, Norway. The 2,138-metre (7,014 ft) tall mountain is located in the Rondane mountains within Rondane National Park. The mountain sits about 20 kilometres (12 mi) northeast of the town of Otta. The mountain is surrounded by several other notable mountains including Svartnuten and Steet to the west, Vinjeronden and Rondeslottet to the northwest, Rondvasshøgde to the east, Hornflågene to the southeast, and Simlepiggen to the south.

== Name ==
The first element is stor which means 'large' or 'big'. The last part of the name comes from the words rond which was probably the original name of the nearby lake Rondvatnet. Many of the mountains near the lake were then named after this lake. The Old Norse form of the name was rǫnd which means 'stripe' or 'edge' (referring to the long and narrow form of the lake).

== See also ==
- List of mountains of Norway by height
