= Gråhøe (Dovre) =

Mountain in Dovre, Norway

- Interactive map of the mountain

Highest point
- Elevation: 1,665 m (5,463 ft)
- Prominence: 189 m (620 ft)
- Parent peak: Halvfarhøe
- Isolation: 4.8 km (3.0 mi)
- Coordinates: 62°07′23″N 9°33′27″E

Geography
- Location: Innlandet, Norway
- Parent range: Dovrefjell

Gråhøe is a mountain in Dovre Municipality in Innlandet county, Norway. The 1,665-metre (5,463 ft) tall mountain is located in the Dovrefjell mountains and inside the Dovre National Park, about 22 kilometres (14 mi) northeast of the village of Dombås and about 12 kilometres (7.5 mi) south of the village of Hjerkinn. The mountain is surrounded by several other notable mountains including Falketind and Blåberget to the northwest, Halvfarhøe to the west, and Storhøe and Fokstuguhøe to the southwest.

== See also ==
- List of mountains of Norway
