= Rondvasshøgde =

Mountain in Innlandet, Norway

- Rondvasshøgdi (unofficial)
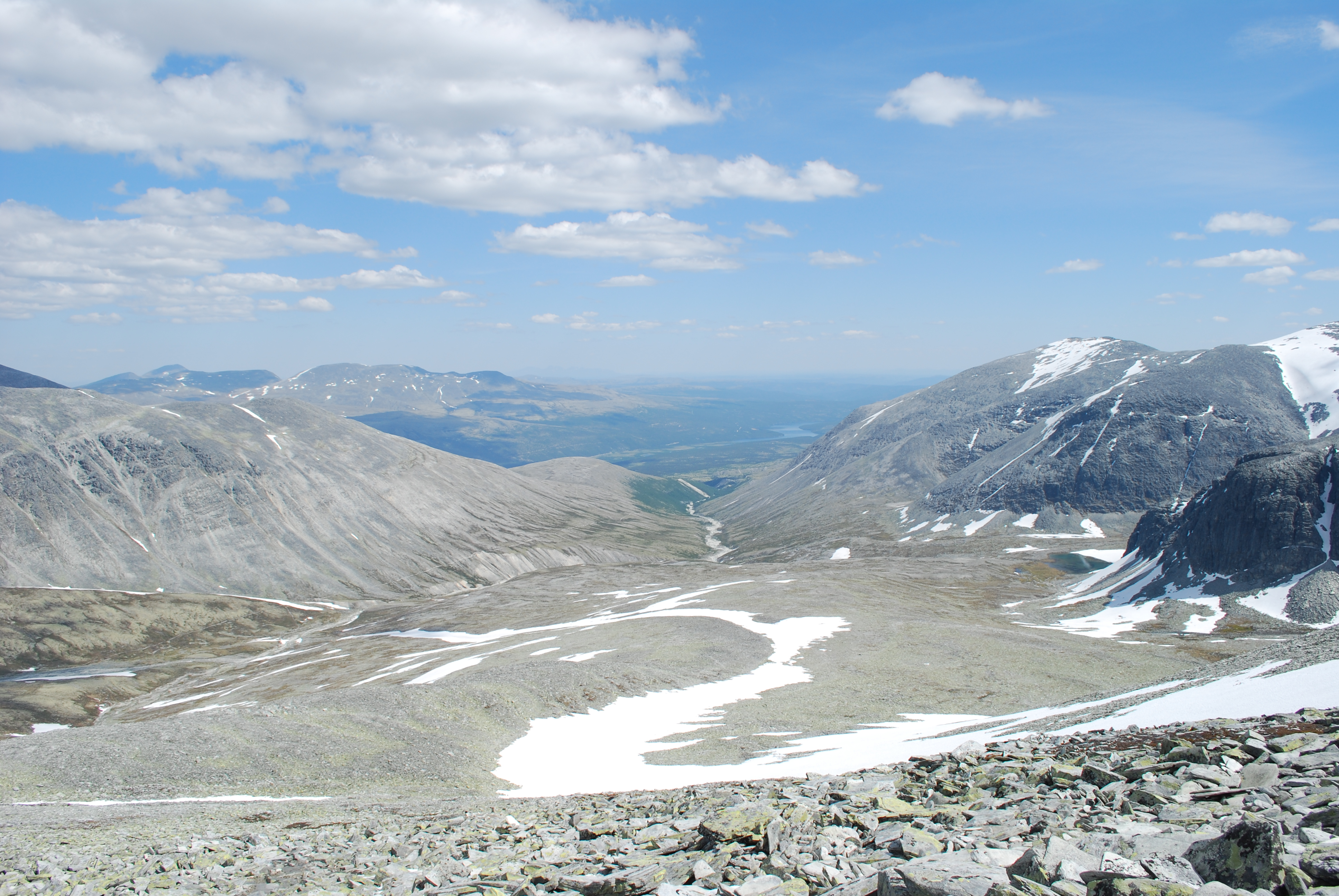

Highest point
- Elevation: 1,923 m (6,309 ft)
- Prominence: 133 m (436 ft)
- Parent peak: Storronden
- Coordinates: 61°53′14″N 9°53′10″E

Geography
- Interactive map of the mountain
- Location: Innlandet, Norway
- Parent range: Rondane
- Topo map: 1718 I Rondane

Rondvasshøgde is a mountain ridge in Innlandet county, Norway. The ridge is located in Sel Municipality although one end of the ridge extends across the border into Folldal Municipality. The ridge consists of 3 main peaks: Rondvasshøgde Sentraltopp, Rondvasshøgde Øst, and Rondvasshøgde Øst 2. The mountain lies about 20 kilometres (12 mi) northeast of the town of Otta. The mountain is surrounded by several other notable mountains including Veslsvulten to the east, Hornflågene to the southeast, Simlepiggen to the southwest, and Storronden and Svartnuten to the west.

Rondvasshøgde Sentraltopp measures 1,865 metres (6,119 ft) and it sits towards the western end of the ridge, just east of the mountain Storronden. Rondvasshøgde Øst measures 1,923 metres (6,309 ft) (the tallest of the three peaks) and this sits between the other two peaks. Rondvasshøgde Øst 2 measures 1,838 metres (6,030 ft) and this sits on the municipal border between Sel and Folldal. The mountain Veslsvulten lies just east of this peak.

== Name ==
The first part of the name comes from the words rond which was probably the original name of the nearby lake Rondvatnet and the second part is vass which means 'water', probably referring to the lake. Many of the mountains near the lake were then named after this lake. The Old Norse form of the name was rǫnd which means 'stripe' or 'edge' (referring to the long and narrow form of the lake). The last element is høg which means 'high' or 'tall'.

== See also ==
- List of mountains of Norway
