= Vassberget =

Mountain in Dovre, Norway

- Interactive map of the mountain

Highest point
- Elevation: 1,855 m (6,086 ft)
- Prominence: 257 m (843 ft)
- Parent peak: Trolltinden
- Isolation: 2.7 km (1.7 mi) to Nørdre Smedhamran
- Coordinates: 61°56′58″N 9°40′47″E

Geography
- Location: Innlandet, Norway
- Parent range: Rondane

Vassberget is a mountain in Dovre Municipality in Innlandet county, Norway. The 1,855-metre (6,086 ft) tall mountain is located in the Rondane mountains and inside the Rondane National Park, about 20 kilometres (12 mi) northeast of the town of Otta and about 32 kilometres (20 mi) southeast of the village of Dombås. The mountain is surrounded by several other notable mountains including Digerronden to the east; Veslesmeden, Storsmeden, and Trolltinden to the southeast; Sagtindan and Indre Bråkdalshøe to the south, Gråhøe to the west; and Stygghøin to the northeast.

== See also ==
- List of mountains of Norway
