= Jutulhogget (Sel) =

Canyon in Innlandet, Norway

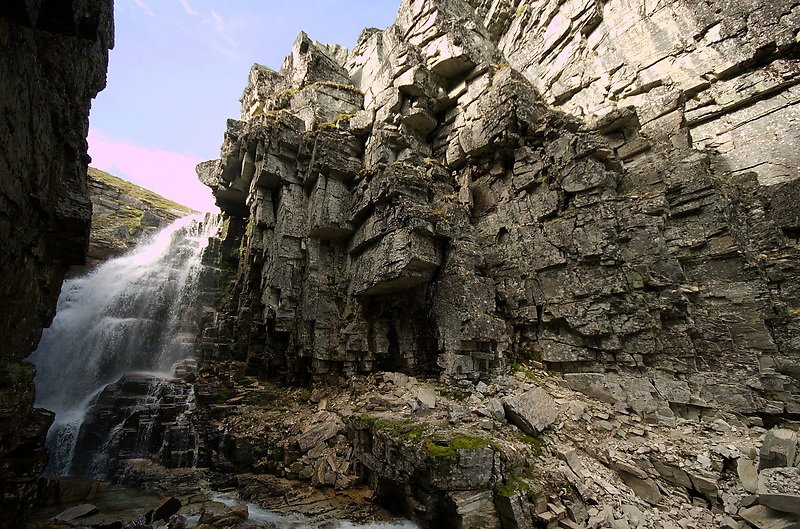

Geology
- Type: Canyon

Geography
- Location: Innlandet, Norway
- Coordinates: 61°52′38″N 9°47′23″E
- Interactive map of Jutulhogget

Jutulhogget is a small canyon in Sel Municipality in Innlandet county, Norway. The 500-metre (1,600 ft) long canyon is located just southwest of the Rondvassbu hiking cabins at the south end of the lake Rondvatnet inside Rondane National Park. The highest parts of the canyon walls reach approximately 20–30 metres (66–98 ft) high. The canyon was dug out by large amounts of water at the end of the last ice age.
