= Indre Bråkdalshøe =

Mountain in Innlandet, Norway

- Interactive map of the mountain

Highest point
- Elevation: 1,597 m (5,240 ft)
- Parent peak: Trolltinden
- Coordinates: 61°55′13″N 9°37′53″E

Geography
- Location: Innlandet, Norway
- Parent range: Rondane
- Topo map: 1718 I Rondane

Indre Bråkdalshøe is a mountain in Sel Municipality in Innlandet county, Norway. The 1,597-metre (5,240 ft) tall mountain is located in the Rondane mountains within Rondane National Park. The mountain sits about 20 kilometres (12 mi) northeast of the town of Otta. The mountain is surrounded by several other notable mountains including Gråhøe to the north, Vassberget to the northeast, Sagtindan and Trolltinden to the east, and Bråkdalsbelgen and Smiukampen to the southeast.

== See also ==
- List of mountains of Norway by height
