= Ljosåbelgen =

Mountain in Innlandet, Norway

- Sukkertoppen / Hammaren
- Interactive map of the mountain

Highest point
- Elevation: 1,948 m (6,391 ft)
- Prominence: 209 m (686 ft)
- Parent peak: Trolltinden
- Isolation: 1.6 km (0.99 mi)
- Coordinates: 61°53′27″N 9°41′59″E

Geography
- Location: Innlandet, Norway
- Parent range: Rondane
- Topo map: 1718 I Rondane

Ljosåbelgen is a mountain in Sel Municipality in Innlandet county, Norway. The 1,948-metre (6,391 ft) tall mountain is located in the Rondane mountains within Rondane National Park. The mountain sits about 20 kilometres (12 mi) northeast of the town of Otta. The mountain is surrounded by several other notable mountains including Sagtindan and Indre Bråkdalshøe to the northwest, Bråkdalsbelgen to the west, Smiukampen to the southwest, Hoggbeitet and Steet to the northeast, and Trolltinden to the north.

== Name ==
According to the Norwegian Mapping Authority, the mountain is officially named Ljosåbelgen. There are also two other officially accepted names that are allowed for use, but they are not the main official name. The other names are Hammaren and Sukkertoppen. Hammaren is an old name for the mountain which is actually a short form of Smedhaammaaren or Smiuhammaren. Those names are not officially used anymore.

== See also ==
- List of mountains of Norway by height
