= UT.no =

Norwegian trip planning website

- Available in: Norwegian, translateable
- Owners: Norwegian Broadcasting Corporation; Norwegian Trekking Association
- Editor: Thor Gjermund Eriksen
- Website: ut.no
- Commercial: Non-profit website
- Registration: Covers all of Norway; News, nature, trips, accommodations
- Current status: Online
- Written in: Norwegian

UT.no is a Norwegian trip-planning website launched on 23 October 2009. The site was originally a joint undertaking between the Norwegian Trekking Association (DNT) and the Norwegian Broadcasting Corporation (NRK).

The site provides information about hiking, skiing, and sightseeing trips, among others.

A mobile application for iPhone and Android launched in 2012, with maps and descriptions of hikes and cottages.
