= Enige og tro inntil Dovre faller =

National motto of Norway

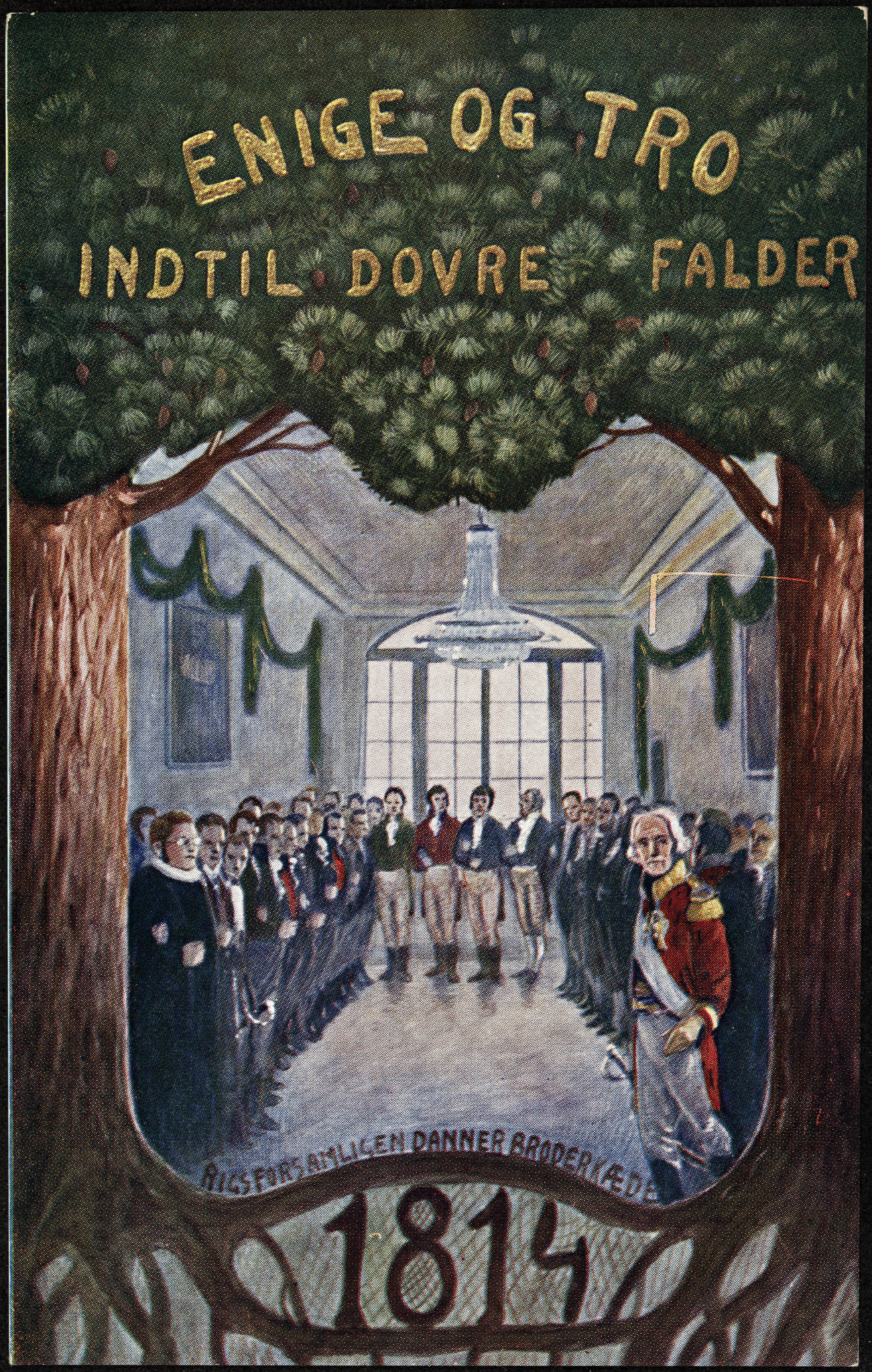
A postcard from 1914, celebrating the 100th anniversary of the Constitution of Norway.

Enige og tro inntil Dovre faller ("United and loyal until Dovre crumbles") is a national motto of Norway. It derives from a quotation of the Constitutional fathers in the 1814 Eidsvoll oath. The oath was taken as a pledge after the negotiations at the National Assembly in Eidsvoll concluded on May 20, 1814.

According to Nicolai Wergeland, a member of the Norwegian Constituent Assembly, the representatives joined arms and formed a chain of brotherhood, upon which they shouted, "United and loyal until the mountains of Dovre crumble". Dovre Mountains were long considered the highest mountains in Norway and played an important role in the national romantic ideology. The words have since been repeated in Norwegian politics and culture as a slogan for national patriotism, independence, unity, and democracy, including during the nation-building period in the 19th century and the dissolution of the union with Sweden in 1905.
