= Vinjeronden =

Mountain in Innlandet, Norway

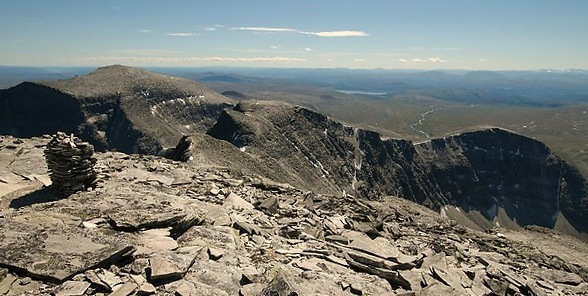
- Vinjeronden (image center) seen from the higher Rondeslottet. Storronden behind to the left.

Highest point
- Elevation: 2,044 m (6,706 ft)
- Prominence: 93 m (305 ft)
- Parent peak: Rondeslottet
- Isolation: 0.818 km (0.508 mi)
- Listing: #5 in Rondane National Park
- Coordinates: 61°54′14″N 9°50′55″E

Geography
- Interactive map of the mountain
- Location: Innlandet, Norway
- Parent range: Rondane
- Topo map: 1718 I Rondane

Climbing
- Easiest route: Hiking

Vinjeronden is a mountain in Innlandet county, Norway. It is one of the ten mountains in the Rondane mountain range measuring over 2,000 metres (6,600 ft) in height. The 2,044-metre (6,706 ft) mountain is a tri-point that lies on the border of the three municipalities of Dovre, Folldal, and Sel. The mountain Rondeslottet lies immediately to the north, the mountains Storronden and Rondvasshøgde lie to the southeast, and Svartnuten lies to the southwest.

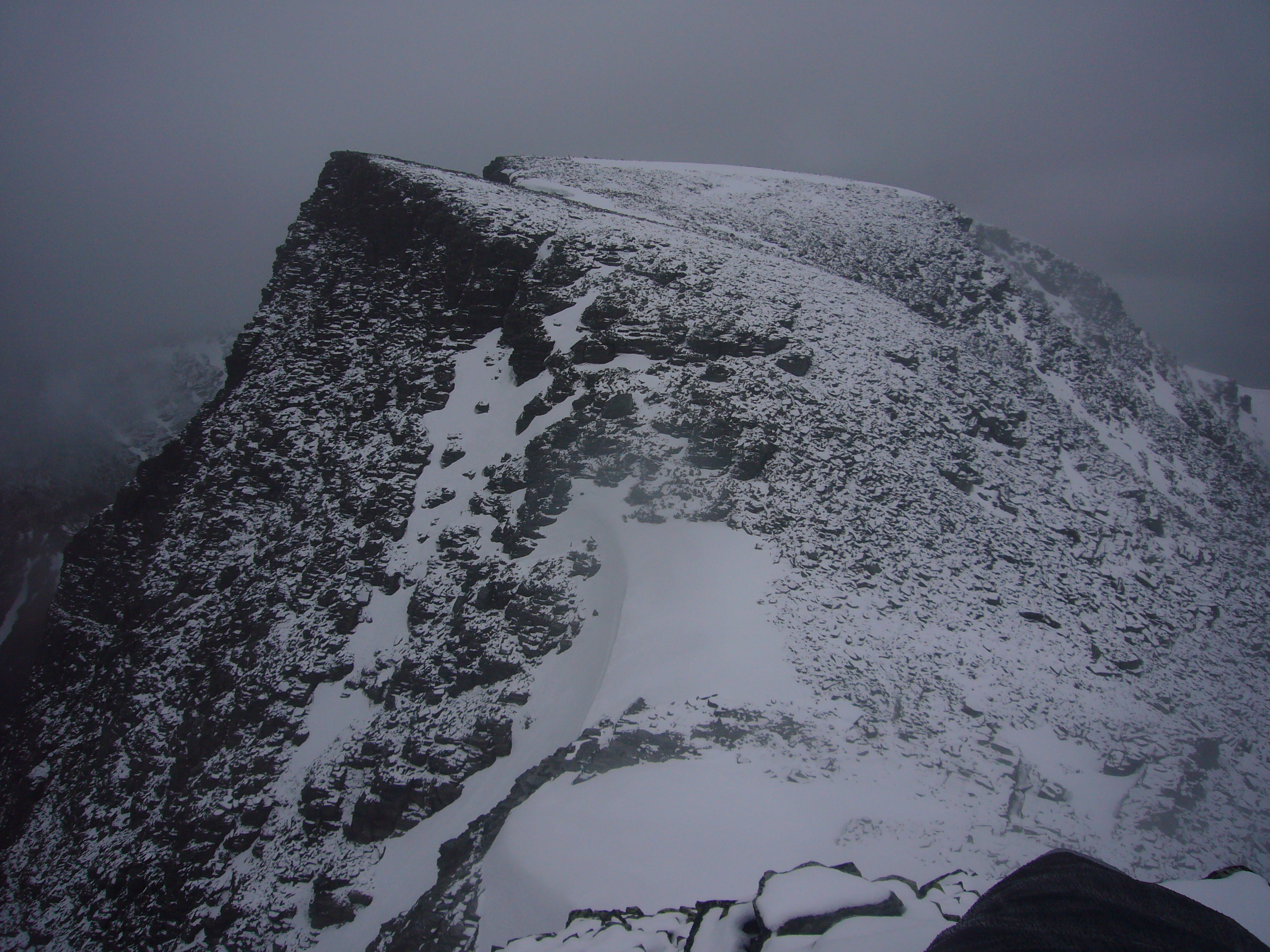
Vinjeronden covered in snow during harsh summer weather.

The mountain is easily accessed by hiking from the Rondvassbu tourist cabin (run by the Norwegian Mountain Touring Association), on the way from Rondvassbu to Rondeslottet, which is the highest mountain in Rondane.

== Name ==
The first part of the mountain name comes from the poet and writer Aasmund Olavsson Vinje. The last part of the name comes from the word rond which was probably the original name of the nearby lake Rondvatnet. Many of the mountains near the lake were then named after this lake. The Old Norse form of the name was rǫnd which means 'stripe' or 'edge' (referring to the long and narrow form of the lake).

== See also ==
- List of mountains of Norway
