= Norwegian Constituent Assembly =

1814 assembly to draw up the Norwegian constitution

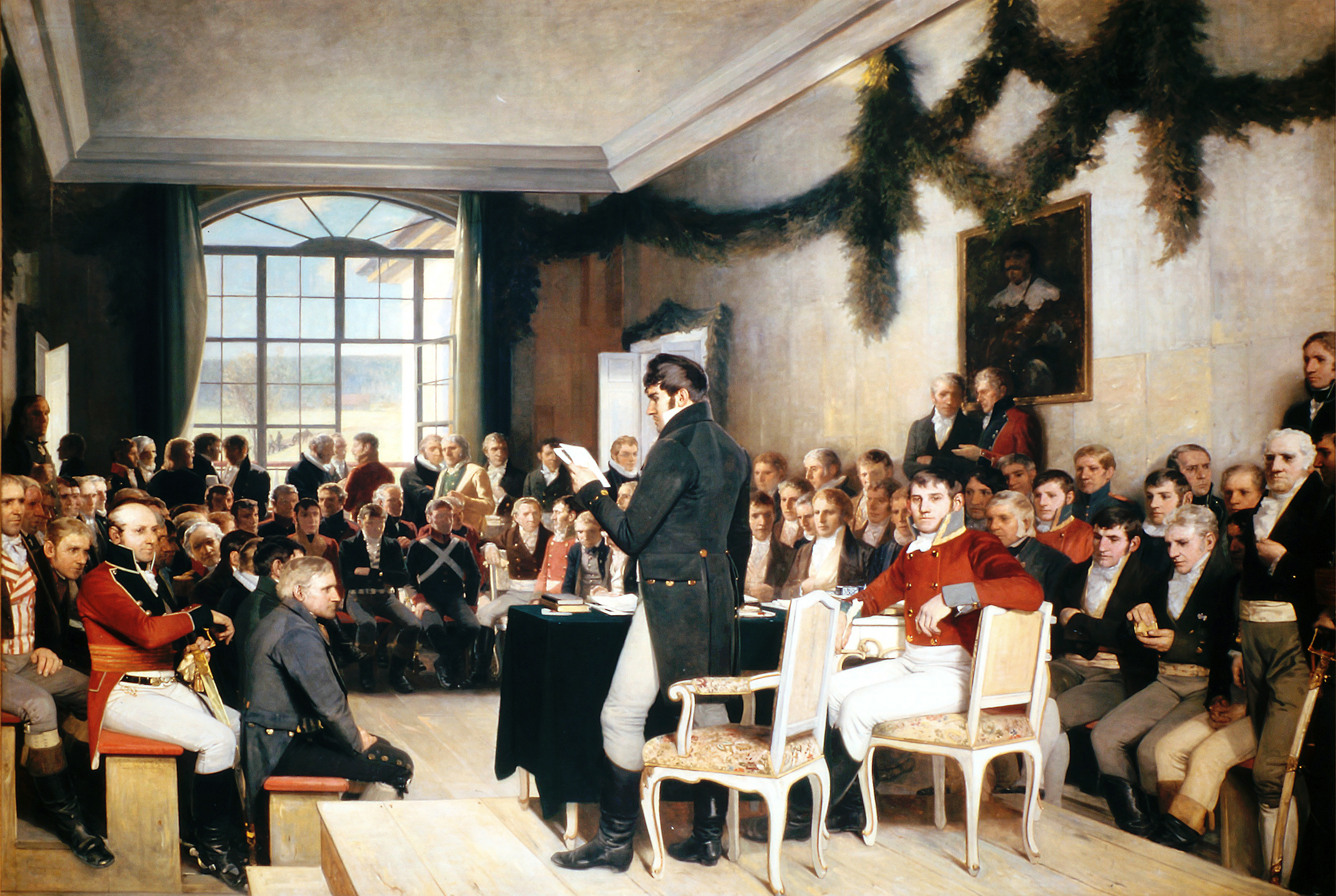
Grunnlovsforsamlingen Eidsvoll 1814 - painting by Oscar Wergeland. The speaker is C.M.Falsen and next to him sits W.F.K.Christie.

The Norwegian Constituent Assembly (Norwegian: Grunnlovsforsamlingen or Riksforsamlingen) is the name given to the 1814 constitutional assembly that adopted the Norwegian Constitution and formalised the dissolution of the union with Denmark. The meetings took place at the Eidsvoll Manor in the village of Eidsvoll Verk in the Eidsvoll parish in Akershus county, Norway from 10 April to 20 May 1814. In Norway, it is often just referred to as Eidsvollsforsamlingen, which means The Assembly of Eidsvoll.

== The Assembly ==
The election started in February 1814 in Christiania (now Oslo) in order to draft the Norwegian Constitution.

The Assembly gathered at Eidsvoll Manor (Eidsvollsbygningen) and became known as "The Men of Eidsvoll" (Eidsvollsmennene).

They first met on 10 April by Eidsvoll Church before the assembly formally opened the next day. It was intended to be composed of delegates from the entire country but the northernmost parts were not represented because of the long distances and lack of time.

Wilhelm Frimann Koren Christie was the assembly's permanent secretary. The Assembly agreed upon the text of the Constitution on 17 May 1814 which from the 1820s began to be celebrated as Norway's National Day although the document was actually signed and dated on the 18th. Sverdrup, who was the last president, gave the final speech. The assembly members departed on 20 May with the oath "United and loyal until the mountains of Dovre crumble!".

=== Leadership ===
Over the nearly six weeks that the assembly was meeting, the presidents and vice presidents of the assembly were chosen for one week at a time. The presidents were:

- 10-17 April: Peder Anker
- 18-24 April: Diderik Hegermann
- 25 April-1 May: Jens Schou Fabricius
- 2-8 May: Christian Adolph Diriks
- 9-16 May: Christian Magnus Falsen
- 17-20 May: Georg Sverdrup

== Background ==
Forced in early 1814 to sign the Treaty of Kiel as an ally of France in the later phase of the Napoleonic Wars, the King of Denmark-Norway had to cede Norway to the King of Sweden. The people of Norway, never consulted, objected to the royal sell-out. The vice-roy and heir presumptive of Denmark-Norway, Christian Frederik, took the lead in an insurrection and called a Constitutional Assembly at Eidsvoll. The Norwegian Constitution of 17 May formalised Norway's independence after more than 400 years of union with Denmark. On the same day, Christian Frederik was elected King of Norway. As a result of this, Sweden invaded Norway. After a campaign of two weeks, a peace treaty (The Convention of Moss) was concluded. King Christian Frederik was forced to abdicate, but Norway remained nominally independent and kept its Constitution with only such amendments as were required to allow it to enter into a loose personal union with Sweden. On 4 November, the Storting amended the Constitution accordingly, and elected the Swedish king King Charles XIII as king of Norway. Although the two states retained their separate governments and institutions, except for the king and the foreign service, Norwegians grew increasingly discontented with the union, which had been forced upon them. In 1905 the union was peacefully dissolved, giving Norway its full independence.

== Rumor about an African servant in a cabinet ==
In 2014 Aftenposten said that for over 100 years "many newspaper articles and history books" have retold a rumour about a boy in a cabinet. Supposedly in the spring of 1814 a small African boy stayed in a corner cabinet, coming out to attend to the tobacco pipes of the guests of the manor. The presence of such a servant is not mentioned in letters or diary notes of any of the delegates.

== See also ==
- List of members of the Norwegian Constitutional Assembly
- Constitution of Norway
- Norway in 1814
- Norwegian Constitution Day
- History of Norway
