= Veslesmeden =

Mountain in Dovre, Norway

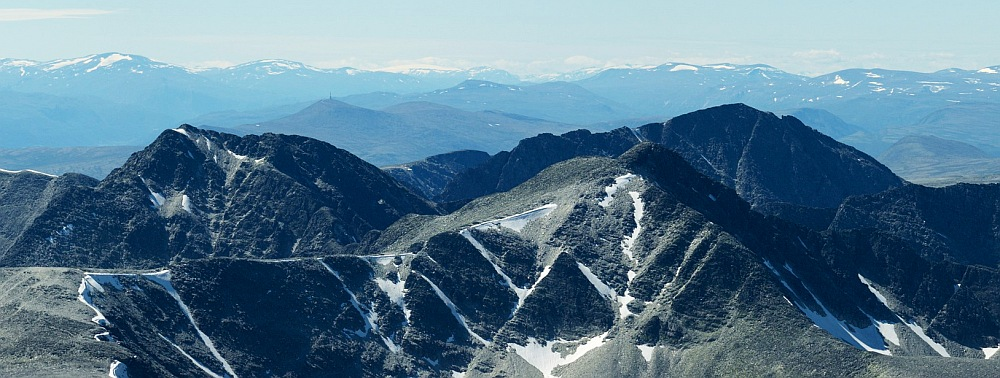
- Veslesmeden is the right summit of the frontmost ridge. Seen from Rondeslottet. Storsmeden to the left and Trolltinden in the back.

Highest point
- Elevation: 2,015 m (6,611 ft)
- Prominence: 215 m (705 ft)
- Parent peak: Storsmeden
- Isolation: 1.2 km (0.75 mi) to Trolltinden
- Coordinates: 61°55′00″N 9°45′25″E

Geography
- Interactive map of the mountain
- Location: Innlandet, Norway
- Parent range: Rondane
- Topo map: 1718 I Rondane

Veslesmeden is a mountain in Dovre Municipality in Innlandet county, Norway. The 2,015-metre (6,611 ft) tall mountain is located in the Rondane mountains and inside the Rondane National Park, about 18 kilometres (11 mi) northeast of the town of Otta and about 37 kilometres (23 mi) southeast of the village of Dombås. The mountain is surrounded by several other notable mountains including Digerronden and Høgronden to the northeast, Rondeslottet to the east, Storsmeden to the south, Sagtindan and Trolltinden to the west; Gråhøe and Vassberget to the northwest; and Stygghøin to the north.

The mountain is easily hiked from the cabin Rondvassbu (DNT). Experienced mountain hikers may scramble to Storsmeden from Veslesmeden.

== Name ==
The meaning of the name is "the little blacksmith".

== See also ==
- List of mountains of Norway
