= Bråkdalsbelgen =

Mountain in Innlandet, Norway

- Interactive map of the mountain

Highest point
- Elevation: 1,915 m (6,283 ft)
- Prominence: 109 m (358 ft)
- Parent peak: Ljosåbelgen
- Isolation: 1.3 km (0.81 mi)
- Coordinates: 61°53′39″N 9°40′30″E

Geography
- Location: Innlandet, Norway
- Parent range: Rondane
- Topo map: 1718 I Rondane

Bråkdalsbelgen is a mountain in Sel Municipality in Innlandet county, Norway. The 1,915-metre (6,283 ft) tall mountain is located in the Rondane mountains within Rondane National Park. The mountain sits about 20 kilometres (12 mi) northeast of the town of Otta. The mountain is surrounded by several other notable mountains including Ljosåbelgen, Hoggbeitet, Smiukampen, and Sagtinden, all three of which overlook Verkilsdal, a small river valley. A small lake, Verkilsdalsvatnet, is located at the base of Bråkdalsbelgen.

== See also ==
- List of mountains of Norway by height
