= Sagtindan =

Mountain in Dovre, Norway

- Sagtinden
- Interactive map of the mountain

Highest point
- Elevation: 1,838 m (6,030 ft)
- Prominence: 122 m (400 ft)
- Parent peak: Trolltinden
- Isolation: 2.2 km (1.4 mi)
- Coordinates: 61°54′48″N 9°39′57″E

Geography
- Location: Innlandet, Norway
- Parent range: Rondane
- Topo map: 1718 I Rondane

Sagtindan is a mountain on the border of Sel Municipality and Dovre Municipality in Innlandet county, Norway. The 1,838-metre (6,030 ft) tall mountain is located in the Rondane mountains and inside the Rondane National Park, about 17 kilometres (11 mi) northeast of the town of Otta and about 33 kilometres (21 mi) southeast of the village of Dombås. The mountain is surrounded by several other notable mountains including Veslesmeden, Storsmeden, and Trolltinden to the northeast; Ljosåbelgen and Bråkdalsbelgen to the southeast; Gråhøe and Indre Bråkdalshøe to the northwest, and Vassberget to the north.

The mountain has a second, lower peak to the northwest of the main peak. This second peak reaches 1,811 metres (5,942 ft).

== See also ==
- List of mountains of Norway
