= Norwegian Trekking Association =

Hiking organization in Norway

- Den norske turistforening (Norwegian)
- Abbreviation: DNT
- Formation: 21 January 1868
- Type: Trekking association
- Headquarters: Oslo, Norway
- Members: 300,000
- Official language: Norwegian
- Secretary-General: Dag Terje Klarp Solvang
- Website: www.dnt.no

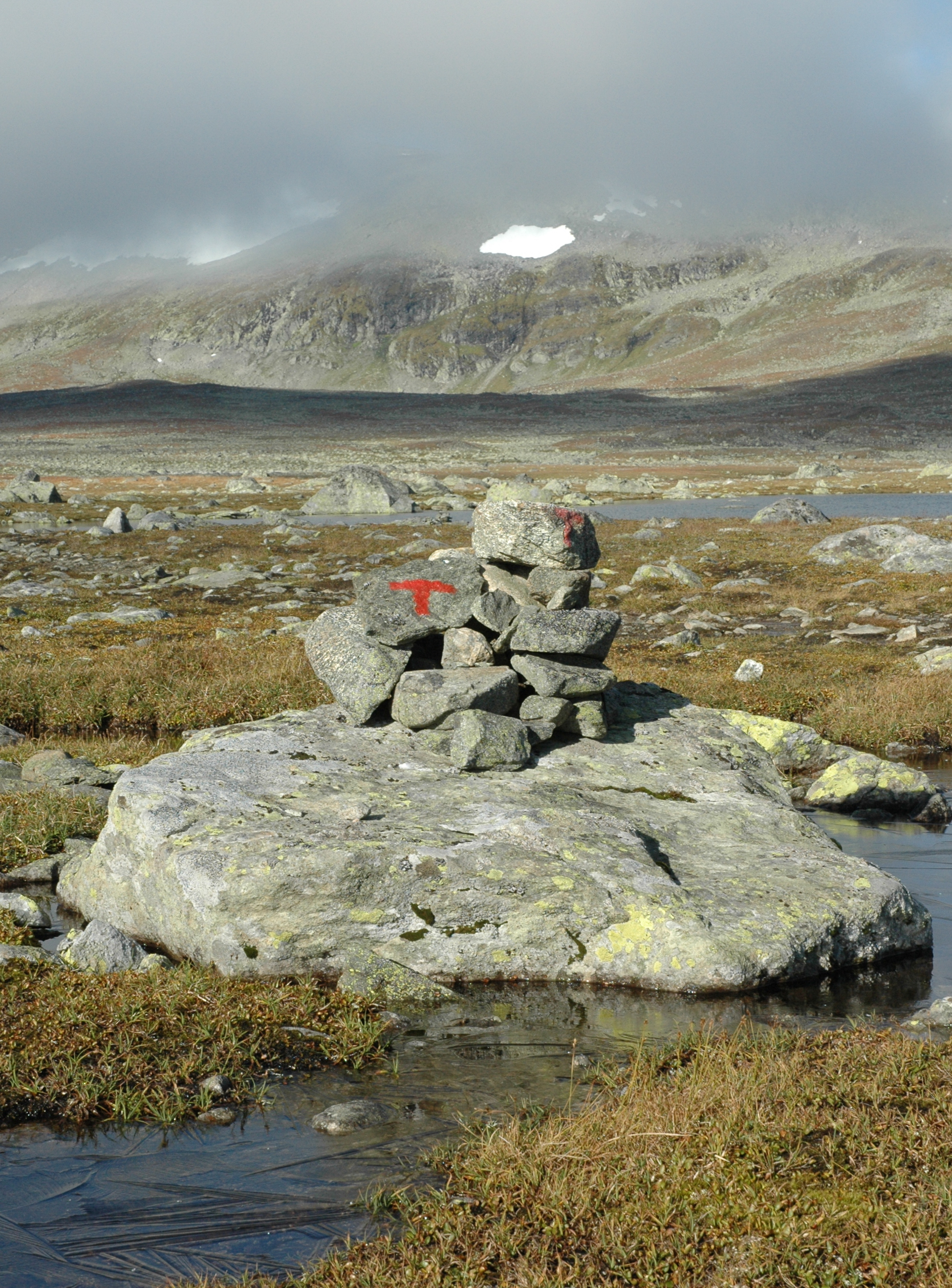
The red T marking the path; hall-mark of the tourist organization

The Norwegian Trekking Association (Norwegian: Den norske turistforening, DNT) is a Norwegian association which maintains mountain trails and cabins in Norway. The association was founded on 21 January 1868 with the scope "to help and develop tourism in this country". Today the goal is to work for simple, secure and environmentally friendly outdoor activities. DNT has currently more than 300,000 individual members, and 57 local chapters. It also has several "honorary members", prominent people who have shown a keen interest in Norwegian nature and given the country publicity as a tourist destination, among them Kofi Annan and Katie Melua. The secretary-general of the association is Dag Terje Klarp Solvang.

The mountains of Norway have always been utilised by the Norwegian people since the first Norwegians followed the reindeer when the ice cap retracted ten thousand years ago.

DNT's first hut was Krokan by the Rjukan waterfall. The waterfall was later harnessed for hydropower production and the hut was sold. Today it is re-opened, situated by the main road from Tinn Municipality to Vinje Municipality. Together with local organisations all over Norway, it operates more than 550 cabins in Norwegian mountains and forest areas.

Olav Thon, a Norwegian real-estate investor and hobby trekker, has so far donated 55 million kr to the association. The money has been spent to build new and refurbish existing cabins.

== Using the huts ==
Forty one of the huts are staffed. The rest are self-service, some with provisions and some without. The self-service huts are occasionally locked, and to use them it is necessary to get a key from the DNT for a NOK 100 returnable deposit. Every self-service hut contains a stack of debit/credit card forms for payment. This form must be filled out at the conclusion of a stay and dropped into the payment box. You must register before using a bunk.

Most self-service huts have solar panels, and therefore electricity, but no running water, so they are usually located very close to a river from which buckets may be filled. Before leaving a self-service hut, it is considered good etiquette to carry in firewood, do the dishes, clean the floor and (if necessary) lock the door behind you.

== See also ==
- Tourism in Norway
- List of national parks of Norway
- UT.no
