= Gråhøe (Sel) =

Mountain in Innlandet, Norway

- Interactive map of the mountain

Highest point
- Elevation: 1,751 m (5,745 ft)
- Prominence: 73 m (240 ft)
- Parent peak: Vassberget
- Isolation: 1.6 km (0.99 mi)
- Coordinates: 61°56′54″N 9°37′27″E

Geography
- Location: Innlandet, Norway
- Parent range: Rondane
- Topo map: 1718 I Rondane

Gråhøe is a mountain on the border of Dovre Municipality and Sel Municipality in Innlandet county, Norway. The 1,751-metre (5,745 ft) tall mountain is located in the Rondane mountains within Rondane National Park. The mountain sits about 20 kilometres (12 mi) northeast of the town of Otta. The mountain is surrounded by several other notable mountains including Indre Bråkdalshøe to the south, Sagtindan and Trolltinden to the southeast, and Vassberget to the east.

== See also ==
- List of mountains of Norway by height
