= Dovrefjell =

Mountain range in Norway

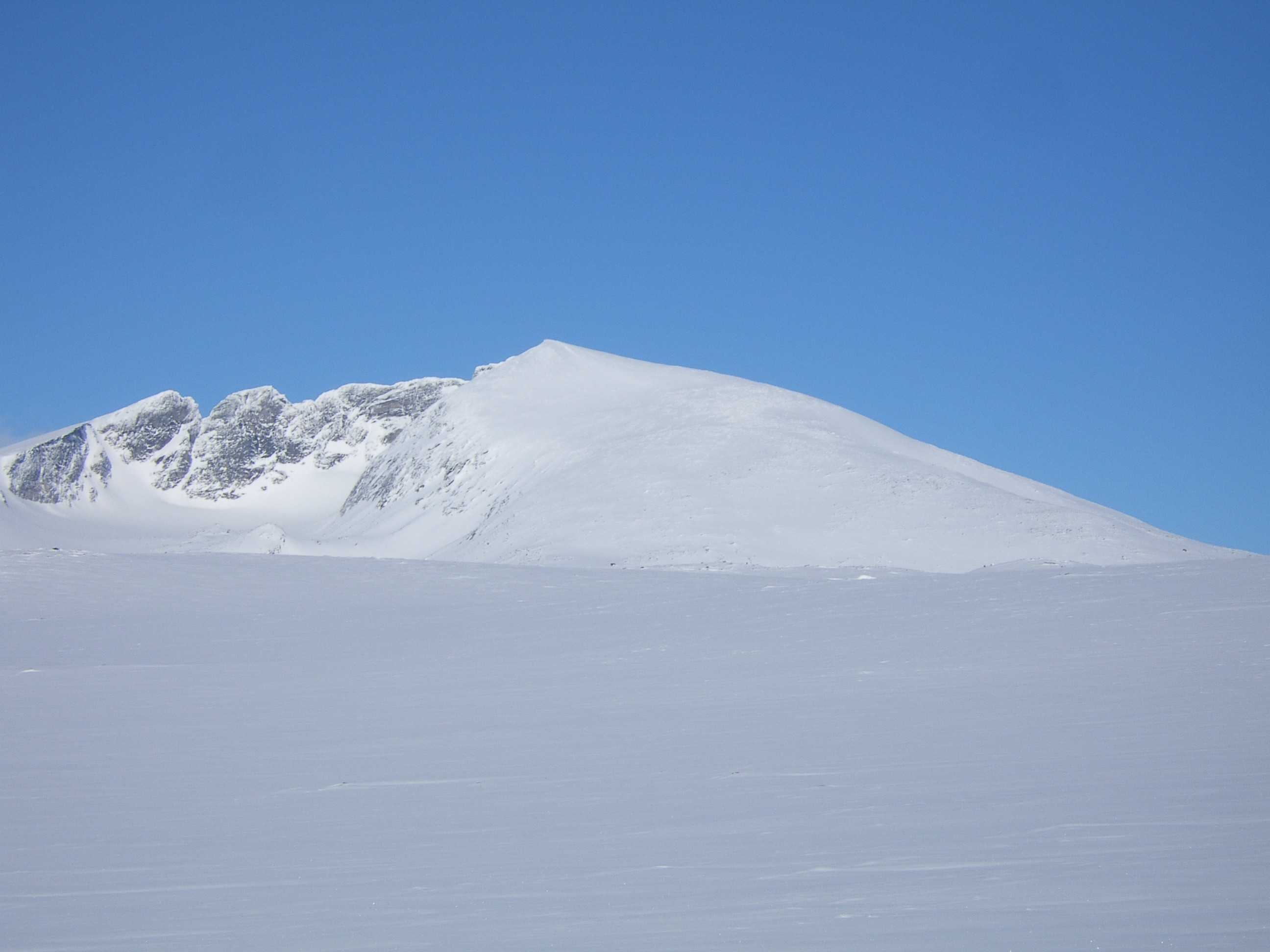
- Snøhetta, the highest mountain on Dovrefjell, in the winter.

Highest point
- Peak: Snøhetta, Dovre Municipality, Innlandet
- Elevation: 2,286 m (7,500 ft)
- Prominence: 1,672 m (5,486 ft)
- Isolation: 82.2 km (51.1 mi)
- Coordinates: 62.319829°N 9.26803°E

Dimensions
- Area: 4,500 km^{2} (1,700 mi^{2})

Geography
- Interactive map of the mountain
- Location: Central Norway
- Range coordinates: 62°21′N 9°9′E

Dovrefjell is a mountain range in Central Norway that forms a natural barrier between Eastern Norway and Trøndelag. The mountain range is located in Innlandet, Møre og Romsdal, and Trøndelag counties in Norway. As a result of its central location, its valleys and passes have been heavily trafficked during and probably preceding historical times. Several mountain inns were established in the Middle Ages to house pilgrims traveling through Dovrefjell to Trondheim, and there are even ruins of an old leper colony in the northern area of it.

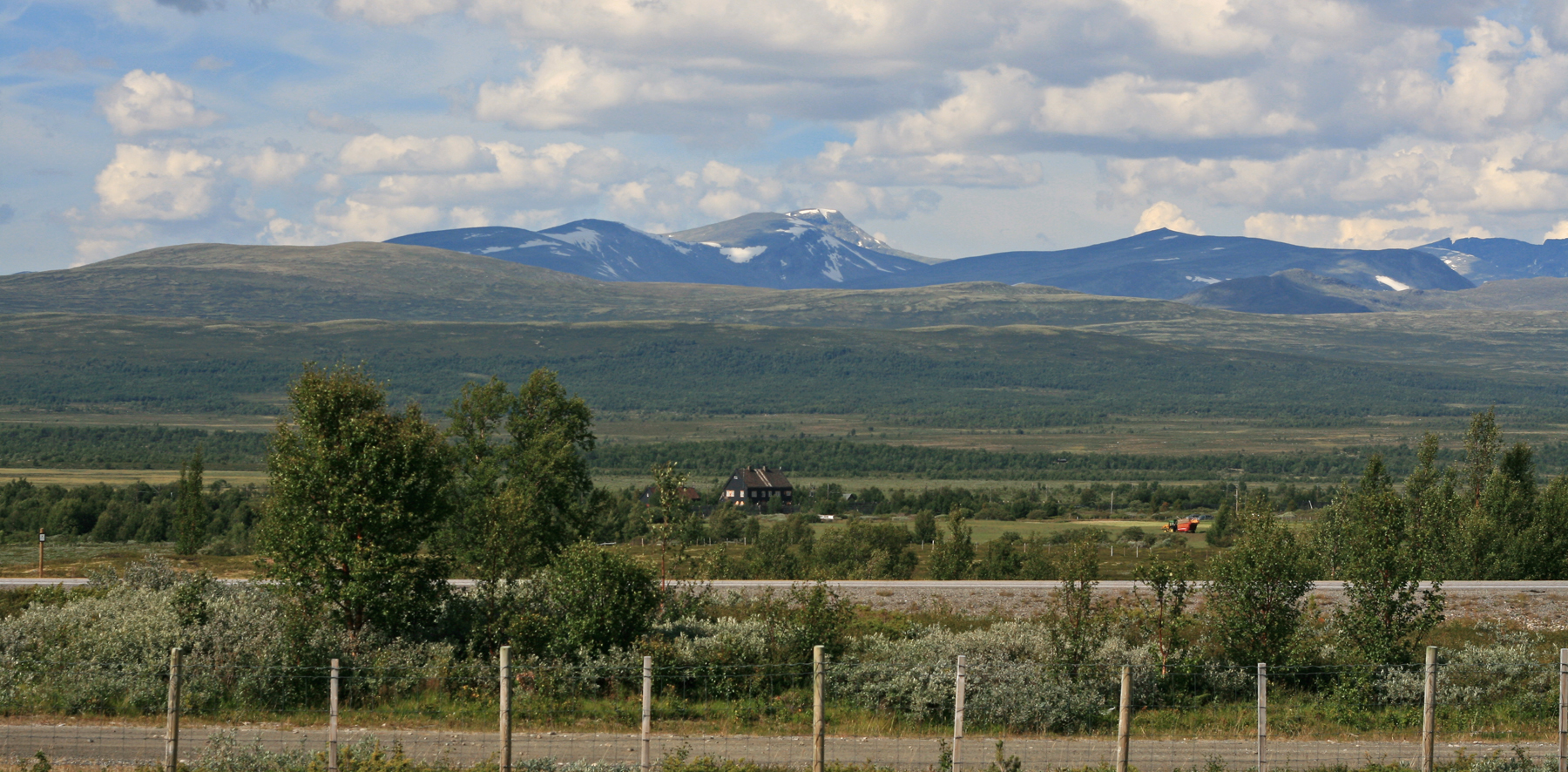
Fokstumyra and the Dovrefjell mountains

The main south-north highway (European route E6) and the Dovrebanen railway line both run through a mountain pass in the Dovrefjell range. The highway is a year-round highway but on rare occasions it is closed for short periods during heavy winter weather conditions. The mountain range runs through Oppdal Municipality in Trøndelag county, Folldal Municipality, Dovre Municipality, and Lesja Municipality in Innlandet county, and Sunndal Municipality in Møre og Romsdal county. The municipalities of Oppdal, Folldal, and Dovre, together, make up what is sometimes known as the Dovre Region.

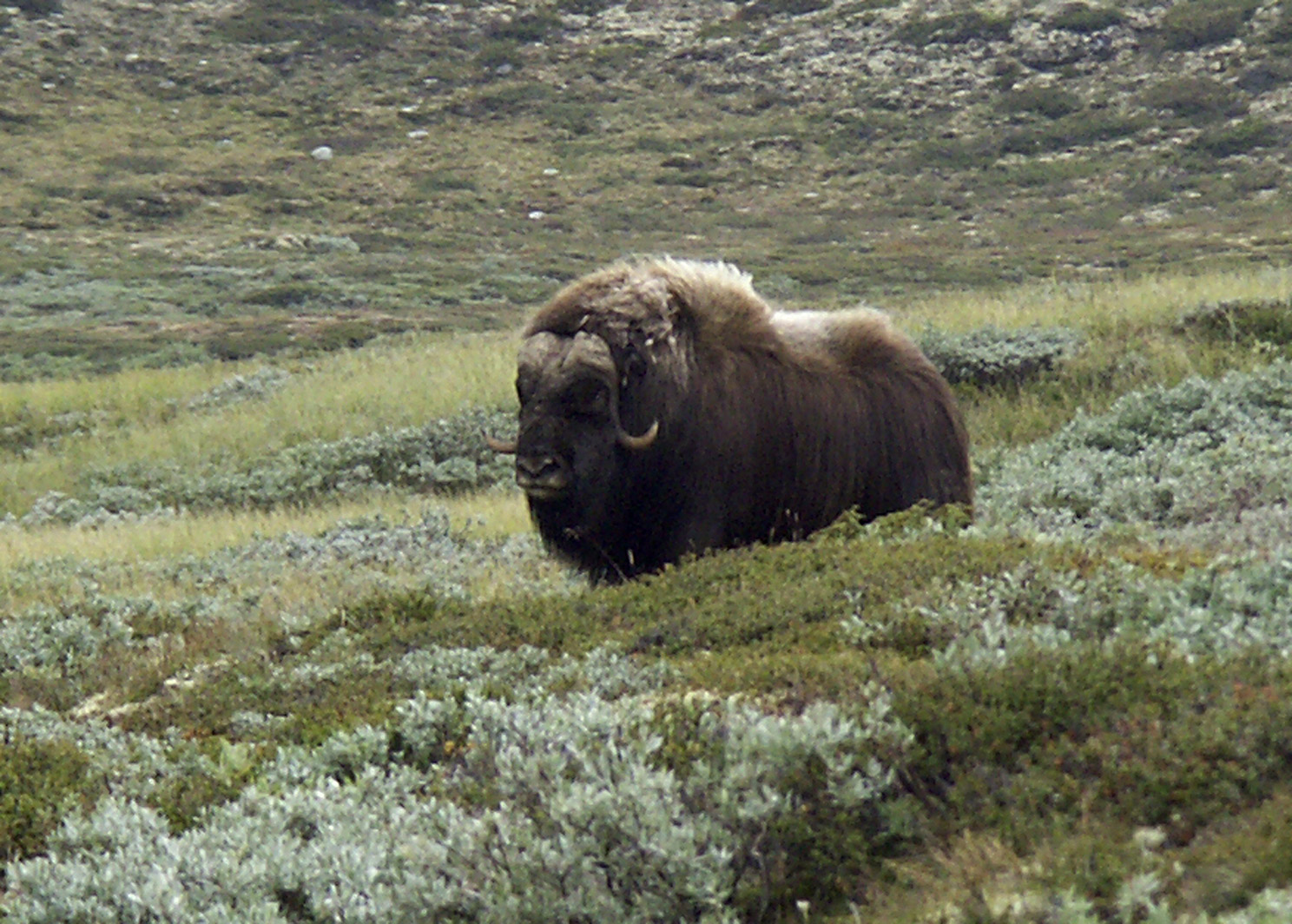
Musk ox at Dovrefjell

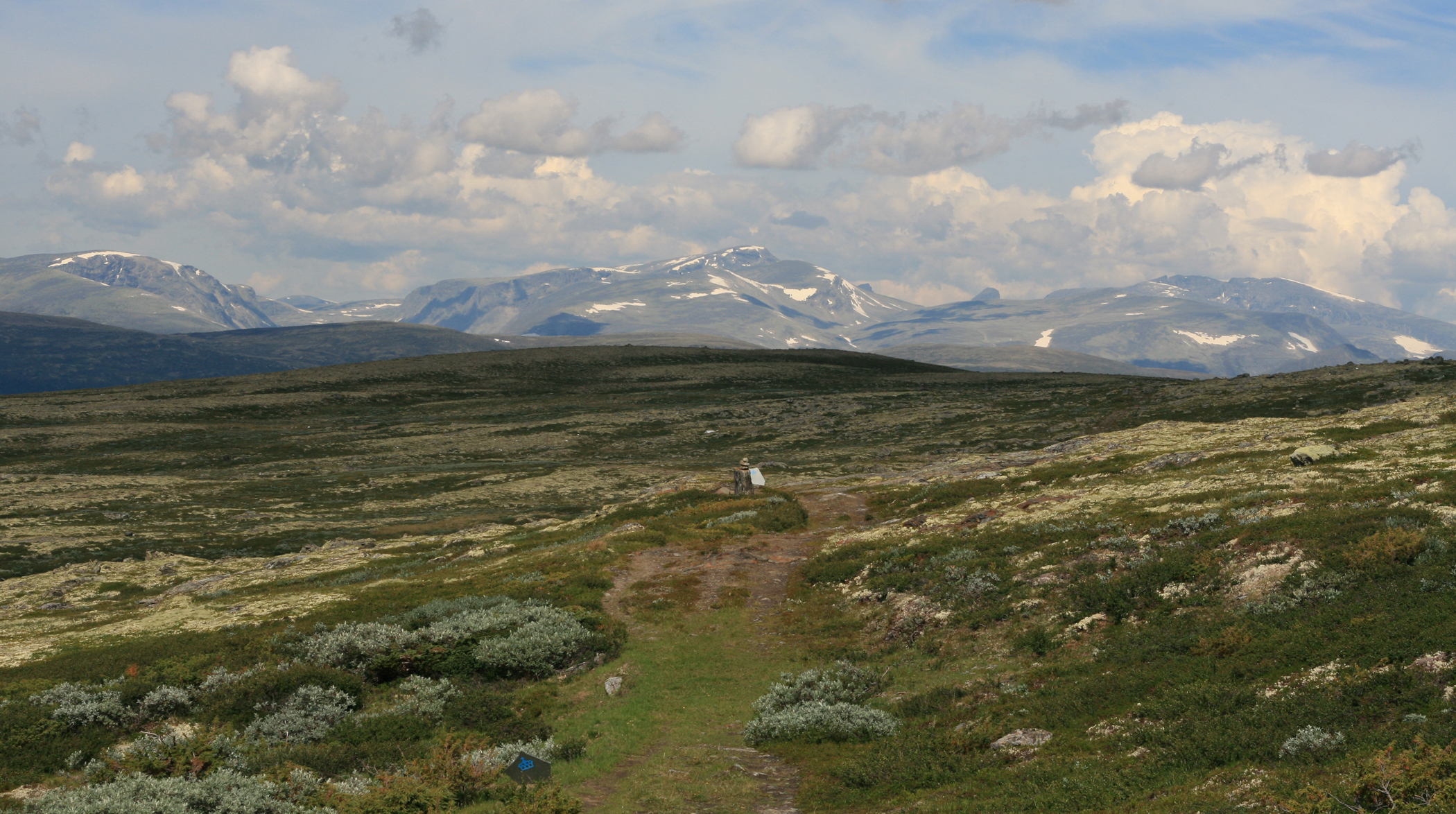
Pilgrimsleden – the Pilgrim route leading to Nidaros Cathedral.

As it is a natural habitat for many rare plants and animals, much of the Dovrefjell range has become a national park in several stages starting in 1911, when some plants were put under protection. When the railroad was built from Oslo to Trondheim in 1921, one of the marshes was preserved. In 1974, parts of the mountain range became Dovrefjell National Park and the park was extensively enlarged in 2002. Together with the neighboring Rondane National Park, the area has Norway (and Europe's) last stock of wild reindeer of Beringian origin. Dovrefjell (west of E6 / the Dovre Line) also has a stock of musk oxen, imported from East Greenland in 1932.

The Dovrefjell area has now been almost entirely protected as two national parks:

- Dovrefjell-Sunndalsfjella National Park, founded 2002, which encompasses the previous and much smaller Dovrefjell National Park.
- Dovre National Park, founded 2003, connecting the protected areas in the Dovrefjell-Sunndalsfjella National Park with Rondane National Park.

The highest mountain in the region is the 2,286-metre (7,500 ft) tall Snøhetta. The range provides cross-country skiing and hiking opportunities. The river Driva, running north through Oppdal Municipality, has its source in the Dovrefjell range.

== Name ==
The first element refers to the geographic area, Dovre. The last element is fjell which means "fell" or "mountain".

The name Dovre (Old Norse: Dofrar) belongs to a group of Scandinavian toponyms that the Swedish linguist Elof Hellquist has derived from a Proto-Norse *đuƀra-, and linguists have further derived them from the old Proto-Indo-European root *dʰub-/dʰup- (cf. PIE *dʰubʰrós "deep"), a root that is also attested in German Topel ("forested valley") and Old Slavic dublŭ ("hole"). There are several place names in Denmark, Norway and Sweden that are identified as related to Dovre:

Denmark

- Døvregaarde in the narrow valley Døvredal, in Bodilsker parish on Bornholm.
- Dover a place with steep slopes in Lintrup parish in Haderslev amt.
- Dovergaard located among deeply cut banks of a small stream, in Skipdsted parish near Aalborg.
- Dover vestergaard, an old farm name, and the bay Doverkil, with hilly terrain, in Ydby parish, near Thisted.
- Dover sogn a parish in Hjelmslev hundred in Århus amt. It has a hilly terrain with steep slopes.

Norway

- Dovre herred (Old Norse: Dofrar) was originally the name of an old farm and it later became the name for the entire hundred.
- Dofrar was the name of a lost farm in Biri hundred, but it survives in the name of a local meadow Dåvreænga.
- Døvre, where the name is derived from dofrar and vin ("meadow").

Sweden

- Dovra sjöar ("lakes of Dovra"), which are three lakes (Northern/Upper, Middle, and Southern) in a fissure valley in Närke.
- Ödesdovra, a farm located at the southernmost extension of the valley.
- Dovern, a long and narrow inlet of the lake Glan in Östergötland, and there is a strait named Doversund and a farm named Doverstorp.

The name has also been given to giants in Scandinavian legends. The name has been given to the giant Dofri, at Dovrefjell, who was helped by Harald Fairhair and in return assisted him all his life. In Närke, the Dovra lakes were attributed to the giantess Dovra who wept for her husband.

From the oldest times has Dovrefjell been the border region between the northern and southern parts of Norway, and the road over the mountain was well known. The expression "til Dovre faller" ('until the Dovre mountains fall') is widely used in Norwegian. It was used in the oath sworn during the Norwegian Constituent Assembly in 1814, when Norway formed an independent nation after being in union with Denmark. At this time it was assumed that Snøhetta in Dovrefjell was the highest mountain in Norway, since the higher peaks in Jotunheimen were fairly unresearched.

== Geology ==
Dovrefjell is a residual massif, which is a mass of rock that has stayed in place as the surrounding relief has been eroded. The tops of Jotunheimen and Dovrefjell and other parts of southern Norway are the few remnants (see summit accordance) of a formerly flat surface that existed in Norway before uplift. This surface is now largely eroded and warped. That erosion formed a series of steps and from the highest of these steps Jotunheimen rises.
