= Trolltinden (Innlandet) =

Mountain in Dovre, Norway

- Sagtinden
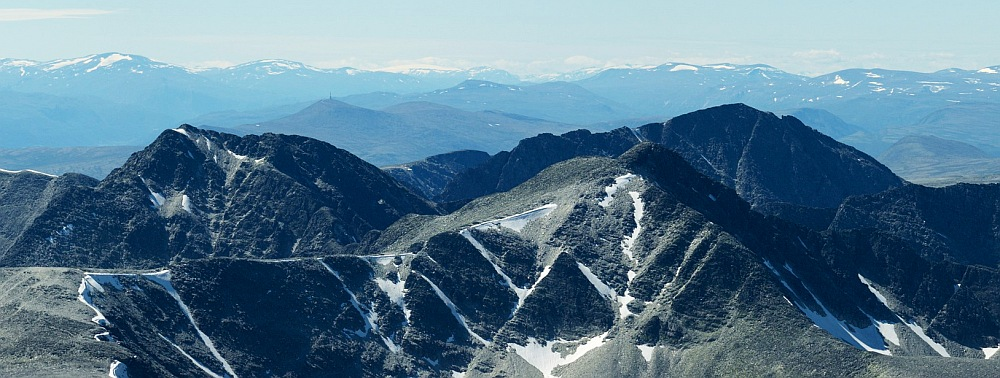
- Trolltinden in the back, right. Storsmeden to the left, and Veslesmeden is the right summit of the frontmost ridge.

Highest point
- Elevation: 2,018 m (6,621 ft)
- Prominence: 857 m (2,812 ft)
- Isolation: 2.6 km (1.6 mi) to Rondeslottet
- Coordinates: 61°55′09″N 9°42′28″E

Geography
- Interactive map of the mountain
- Location: Innlandet, Norway
- Parent range: Rondane
- Topo map: 1718 I Rondane

Trolltinden (a.k.a.: Sagtinden) is a mountain in Dovre Municipality in Innlandet county, Norway. The 2,018-metre (6,621 ft) tall mountain is located in the Rondane mountains and inside the Rondane National Park, about 18 kilometres (11 mi) northeast of the town of Otta and about 35 kilometres (22 mi) southeast of the village of Dombås. The mountain located in a group of mountains called Smiubelgen. The mountain is surrounded by several other notable mountains including Veslesmeden and Storsmeden to the southeast; Ljosåbelgen and Bråkdalsbelgen to the south; Sagtindan and Indre Bråkdalshøe to the west, and Gråhøe and Vassberget to the northwest.

== See also ==
- List of mountains of Norway
