= Dovre National Park =

National park in Norway

- IUCN category II (national park)
- Interactive map of Dovre National Park
- Location: Innlandet, Norway
- Nearest city: Dombås
- Coordinates: 62°5′N 9°32′E
- Area: 289 km^{2} (112 sq mi)
- Established: 2003
- Governing body: Directorate for Nature Management

Dovre National Park (Norwegian: Dovre nasjonalpark) is a national park in Innlandet county, Norway. The park was established in 2003. The park covers an area of 289 square kilometres (112 sq mi) and the altitude varies from the tree line at about 1,000 metres (3,300 ft) up to its highest point at Fokstuhøe at 1,716 metres (5,630 ft). The area consists of plateaus and weathered, rounded mountain peaks.

The park lies between the two larger and older parks Rondane National Park to the southeast and Dovrefjell-Sunndalsfjella National Park to the north. Its opening was part of the larger expansion of parks in the area and its purpose was to protect the area between the two parks. Like Dovrefjell-Sunndalsfjella and Rondane, Dovre national park hosts wild Fennoscandian reindeer of Beringia origin. Part of the reason for the existence of these three adjacent parks is to provide a large contiguous habitat area for the native wild reindeer population.

== Name ==
The park is named after Dovre Municipality. For the meaning of the name, see Dovre Municipality#Name. It is common to use the name Dovre also for the large mountainous area of Dovrefjell which is also known as the Dovre region. From the oldest times has Dovrefjell been the border region between the northern and southern parts of Norway, and the road over the mountain was well known. The expression "til Dovre faller" ('until the Dovre mountains fall apart' = until the end of the world) is widely used in Norwegian.

== Ecotourist ==
In recent decades, tourism has also begun to be seen as a source of economic stability for the country. Norwegian sites are promoting natural destinations on the world market in order to attract more tourists and thus increase the benefits of tourism in the country. This means that many of the nature destinations that were previously closed to the public are now available. However, Norway pays a lot of attention to nature and is looking for ways to achieve sustainable tourism.

Dovre-Sunndalsfjella National Park is one of the largest protected areas in Norway. Therefore, in order to apply ecological tourism, and to protect the park's fauna and vegetation. Norway decided to set some rules for tourists in the park so that activities such as camping, berry and mushroom picking, hunting, trapping and angling are possible, but with agreement, on specially marked routes on the tourist map of the area. Organised tours must have a special permit to operate in the national park. The only exception is traditional trekking activity carried out by tourist associations, schools, kindergartens, non-profit organisations and associations.

== See also ==
- Rondane National Park
- Dovrefjell-Sunndalsfjella National Park
- List of national parks of Norway
- Tourism in Norway
- Norwegian Mountain Touring Association
