= Rondvatnet =

Lake in Innlandet, Norway

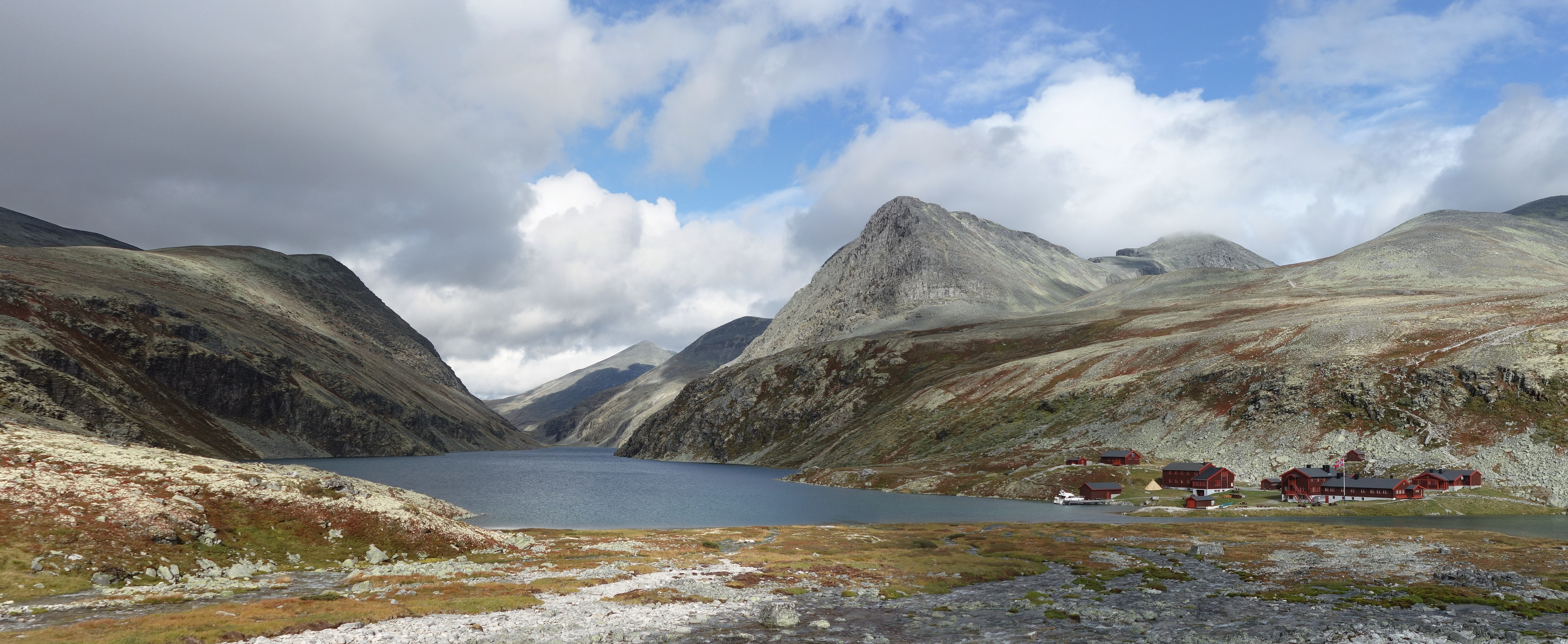
- The lake as seen by the Rondvassbu cabins.
- Interactive map of the lake
- Location: Sel Municipality, Innlandet
- Coordinates: 61.89315°N 9.7984°E
- Primary outflows: Storula river
- Basin countries: Norway
- Max. length: 3.7 kilometres (2.3 mi)
- Max. width: 350 metres (1,150 ft)
- Surface area: 95.56 ha (240 acres)
- Surface elevation: 1,167 metres (3,829 ft)
- References: NVE

Rondvatnet is a lake in Sel Municipality in Innlandet county, Norway. The 95.58-hectare (236.2-acre) lake is a long, narrow lake in Rondane National Park, about 20 kilometres (12 mi) northeast of the town of Otta. The Norwegian Mountain Touring Association's tourist cabins at Rondvassbu are located at the southern end of this lake. Rondvatnet separates the eastern part of Rondane from the western part which is the site of Smiubelgen.

During the summer season, there is boat service on the lake transporting hikers between the southern and northern end. The Jutulhogget canyon is located near the southern end of the lake.

== Name ==
The lake is named Rondvatnet which directly translates to "the Rond water". The first part of the lake's name is rond which was probably the original name of the long and narrow lake. The Old Norse form of the name was just Rǫnd, derived from the word rǫnd which means 'stripe' or 'edge' (referring to the long and narrow form of the lake). The last part of the name is vatnet which means "the water". Several mountains around were then named after this lake.

== See also ==
- List of lakes in Norway
