= Rondeslottet =

Mountain in Rondane, Norway

Rondslottet
- Rondeslottet
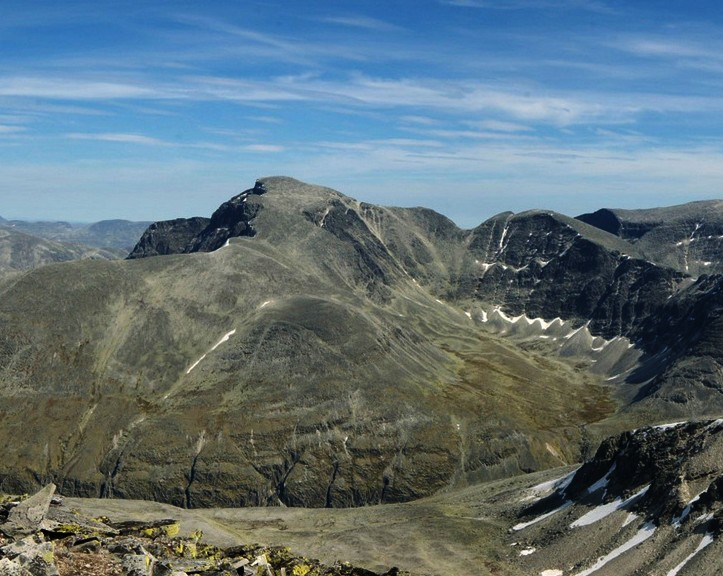
- Rondslottet seen from Veslesmeden

Highest point
- Elevation: 2,178 m (7,146 ft)
- Prominence: 1,230 m (4,040 ft)
- Isolation: 53.6 km (33.3 mi) to Svånåtindan
- Listing: #3 in Innlandet county #1 in Rondane National Park
- Coordinates: 61°54′54″N 9°51′04″E

Geography
- Interactive map of the mountain
- Location: Innlandet, Norway
- Parent range: Rondane
- Topo map: 1718 I Rondane

Rondslottet is the highest mountain in the Rondane mountain range in Innlandet county, Norway. The 2,178-metre (7,146 ft) tall mountain sits on the border between Dovre Municipality and Folldal Municipality, just north of the border with Sel Municipality. There is a trail leading to the summit.

== Name ==
The first part of the name comes from the word rond which was probably the original name of the nearby lake Rondvatnet. Many of the mountains near the lake were then named after this lake. The Old Norse form of the name was rǫnd which means 'stripe' or 'edge' (referring to the long and narrow form of the lake). The last element of the name is the finite form of the Norwegian word slott which means 'palace'.

== See also ==
- List of highest points of Norwegian counties
- List of mountains of Norway

== Guidebooks ==
- Dyer, Anthony; Baddeley, John; Robertson, Ian H. (2006). Walks and Scrambles in Norway. Rockbuy Limited. ISBN 9781904466253.
- Pollmann, Bernhard (2000). Norway South: Rother Walking Guide. Bergverlag Rudolf Rother. ISBN 9783763348077.
