= Rondane National Park =

National park in Norway

- IUCN category II (national park)

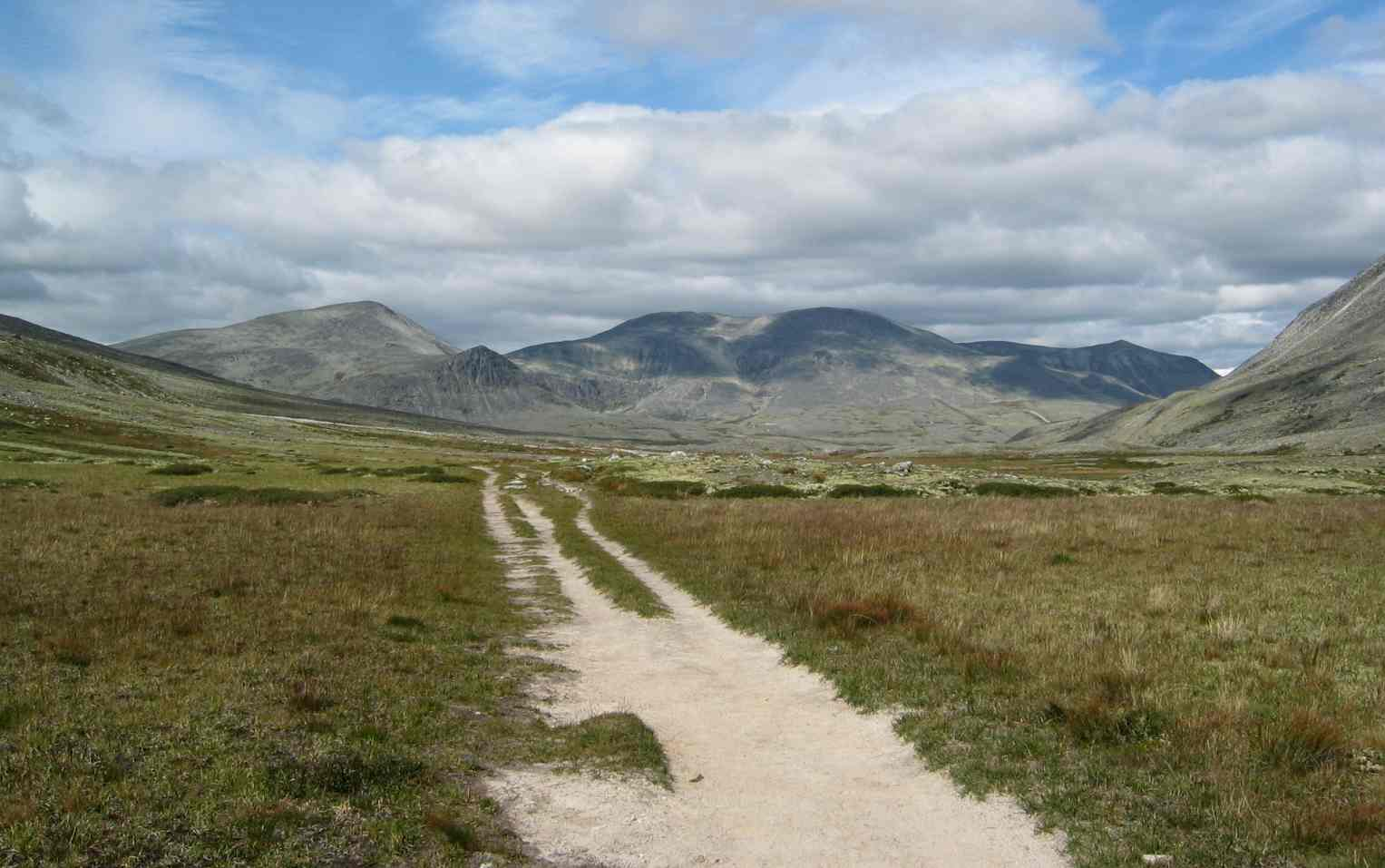
- A path in a u-valley, in summer
- Interactive map of Rondane National Park
- Location: Innlandet, Norway
- Nearest city: Otta
- Coordinates: 61°50′N 9°30′E
- Area: 963 km^{2} (372 sq mi)
- Established: 21 December 1962
- Governing body: Directorate for Nature Management

Rondane National Park (Norwegian: Rondane nasjonalpark) is the oldest national park in Norway, established on 21 December 1962. The park is located in Innlandet county, in the municipalities of Dovre, Folldal, Sel, Nord-Fron, Sør-Fron, Stor-Elvdal, and Ringebu. The park contains ten peaks above 2,000 metres (6,560 ft), with the highest being Rondeslottet at an altitude of 2,178 m (7,146 ft). The park is an important habitat for herds of wild reindeer.

The park was enlarged in 2003, and now covers an area of 963 km^{2} (372 sq mi). Rondane lies just to the east of the Gudbrandsdalen valley and two other mountain areas, Dovre and Jotunheimen are nearby. Dovre National Park lies a very short distance to the north of this park.

== Geography ==
Rondane is a typical high mountain area, with large plateaus and a total of ten peaks above 2,000 metres (6,600 ft). The highest point is Rondeslottet ("The Rondane Castle") at an altitude of 2,178 metres (7,146 ft). The lowest point is just below the tree line, which is located at approximately 1,000 to 1,100 metres (3,300 to 3,600 ft) above sea level. The climate is mild but relatively arid. Apart from the white birch trees of the lower areas, the soil and rocks are mostly covered by heather and lichen, due to a lack of nutrients. The largest mountains are almost entirely barren; above 1,500 metres (4,900 ft) nothing but the hardiest lichens grow on the bare stones.

The mountains are divided by marked valleys through the landscape; the deepest valley is filled by Rondvatnet, a narrow lake filling the steep space between the large Storronden–Rondeslottet massif and Smiubelgen ("The blacksmith's bellows"). The central massif is also cut by "botns": flat, dead stone valleys below the steep mountain walls of the peaks. Generally, Rondane does not receive enough precipitation to generate persistent glaciers, but glacier-like heaps of snow can be found in the flat back valleys.

At the centre of the park lies the lake Rondvatnet, from which all the peaks above 2,000 metres (6,600 ft) in elevation can be reached in less than one day's walk. In the central and northern regions, the altitude is relatively high compared with the flatter plateaus of the south. Rondane has ten peaks over 2,000 metres (6,600 ft) including:

- Rondeslottet, 2,178 metres (7,146 ft)
- Storronden, 2,138 metres (7,014 ft)
- Høgronden, 2,114 metres (6,936 ft)
- Midtronden western summit, 2,060 metres (6,760 ft)
- Vinjeronden, 2,044 metres (6,706 ft)
- Midtronden eastern summit, 2,042 metres (6,699 ft)
- Trolltinden, 2,018 metres (6,621 ft)
- Storsmeden, 2,016 metres (6,614 ft)
- Digerronden, 2,015 metres (6,611 ft)
- Veslesmeden, 2,015 metres (6,611 ft)

In many parts of the park, there are spread-out holes (kettle holes) created by small remains of ice age glaciers, and peculiar small hills called "eskers" made by ground moraine released from melting glaciers.

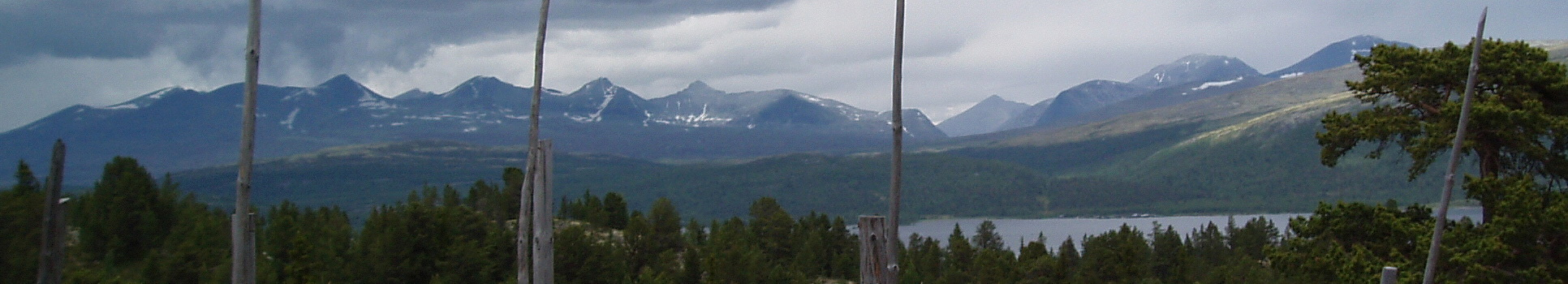
The peaks of Rondane, seen from the south. Storronden and Rondeslottet are the first two on the right. The left part of the massif is Smiubelgen ("The Forge").

== History ==
=== Prehistory ===
The history of life in the area of the park begins at the end of the latest ice age. Large climate changes allowed reindeer to spread widely across Scandinavia, only to be forced back to a much smaller area — including the Rondane mountain area — only some hundreds of years later. Archaeologists have found that the forest quickly grew at high altitudes; birch trees found at 1,030 metres (3,380 ft) were 8500 years old.

On the mountain plateau, there is evidence that nomadic hunter-gatherers lived off reindeer. Large traps used to catch reindeer can be found at Gravhø and Bløyvangen and are also spread throughout the park. These are constructed from stone to make holes or large fenced-in areas into which reindeer could be tricked or led.

Accompanying the substantial traps, smaller arched stone structures are presumed to have served as concealment for archers awaiting their targets. Dating techniques indicate that the oldest of these traps could be approximately 3500 years old. The majority of discoveries, encompassing residential ruins, are dated to the period spanning 500 to 700 AD.

It is thus known with confidence that the large traps and accompanying walls were used from the 6th century until the onset of the Black Death in the 14th century.

=== Establishment ===
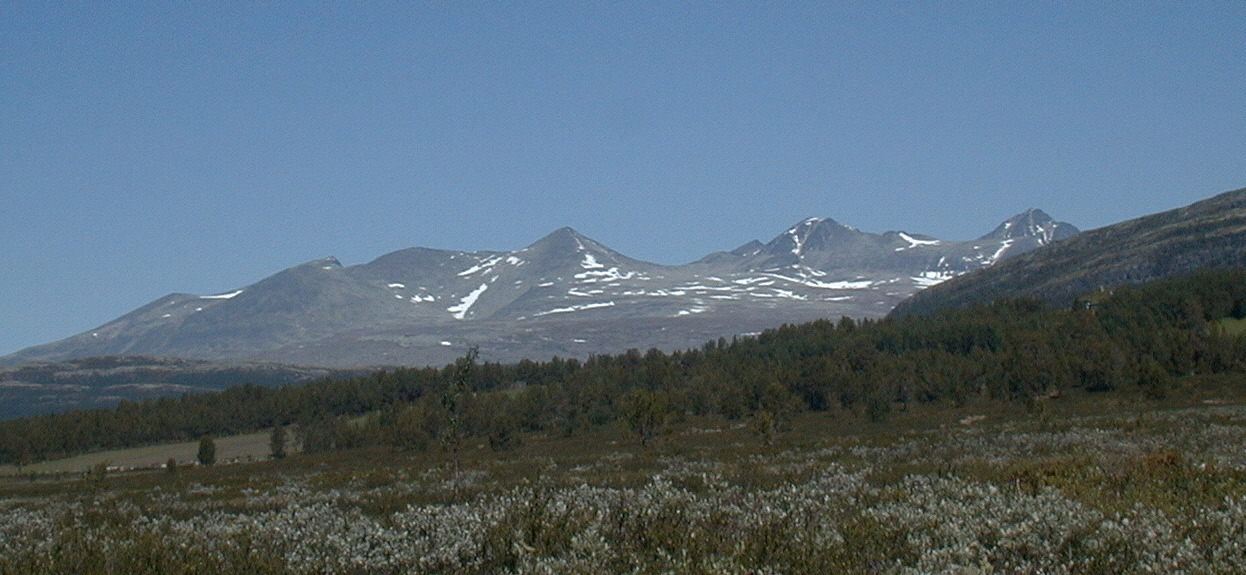
Smiubelgen, the western part of Rondane.

After nearly a decade of planning, Rondane was established as the first Norwegian National Park on 21 December 1962. It was first established as a nature protection area, but was later named a national park. The main reasons for protecting the park were "to safeguard the natural environment with its native plants, animal life, and cultural heritage and also to secure the environment as a recreational area for future generations".

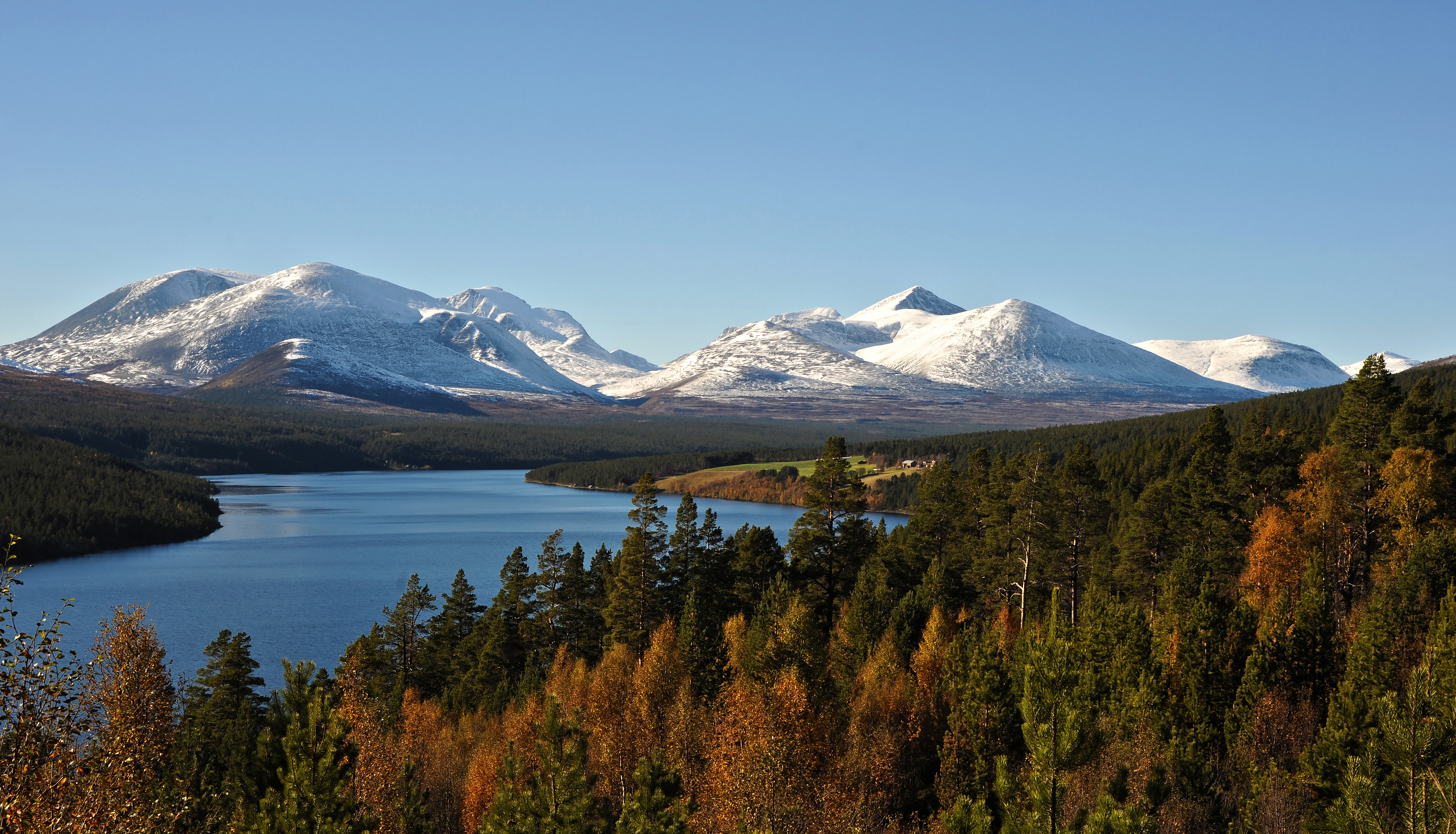
Atnsjøen

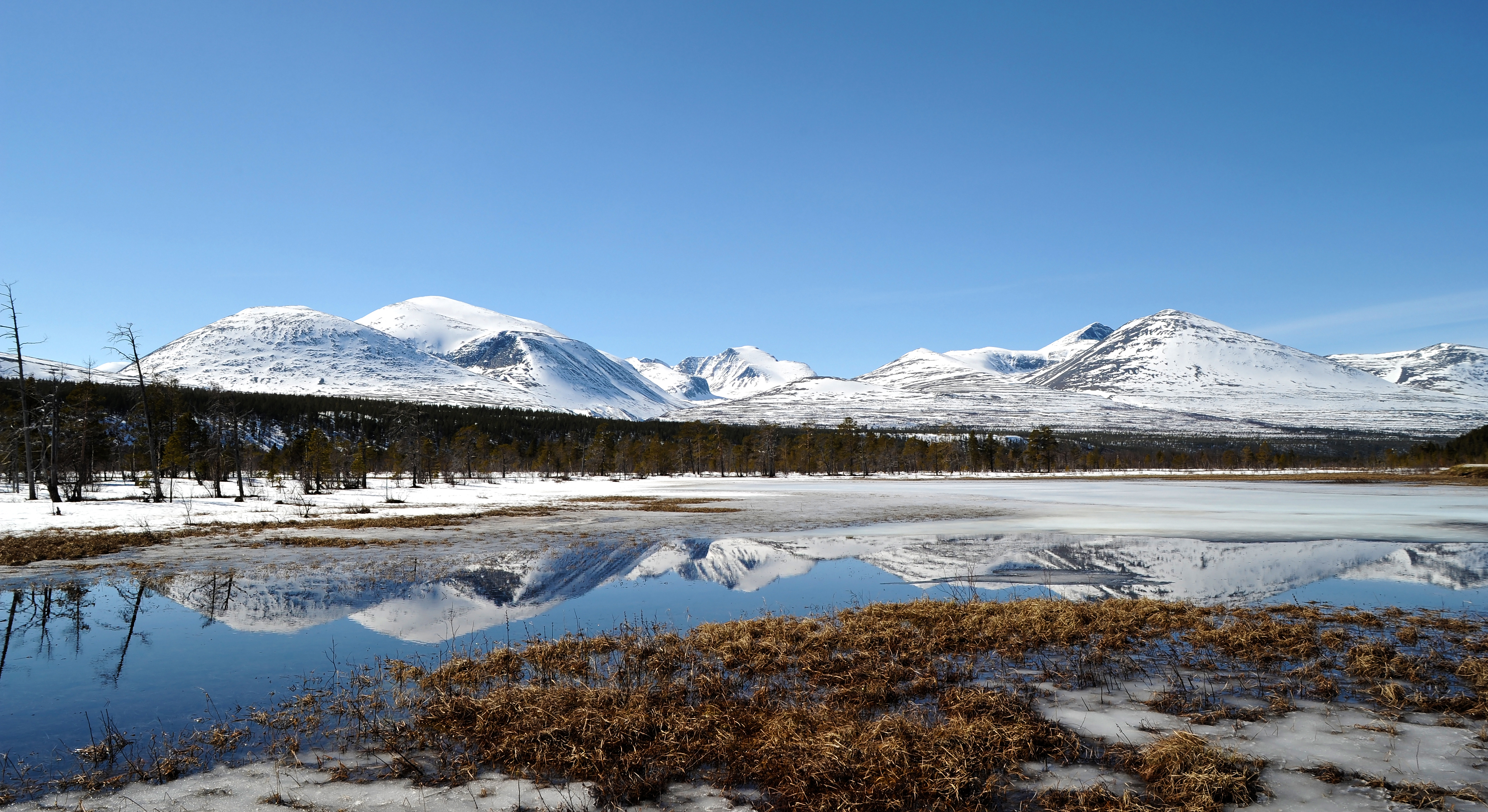
Atnsjømyrene in spring

Legal efforts to protect nature in Norway date from 1954, when the nature protection law was passed. Soon after, in 1955, community meetings were held in the municipalities close to Rondane, and a commission was founded. Norman Heitkøtter was president of the commission, and made it possible by Royal resolution to establish Rondane National Park. At its establishment, the park covered an area of 580 km^{2} (224 sq mi) (later, this was nearly doubled).

Although Rondane was the first national park in Norway, many others followed. The parks are maintained by the Norwegian Directorate for Nature Management.

=== 2003 expansion ===
As a special measure for the protection of the wild reindeer, the park was significantly enlarged in 2003, its area increasing from 580 square kilometres (220 sq mi) to 963 square kilometres (372 sq mi).

The expansion of the park primarily occurred towards the northwest, accompanied by moderate enlargements in the east and south. Furthermore, zones with reduced levels of protection, encompassing both landscape and nature conservation areas, were instituted in conjunction with the park.

A new national park, Dovre National Park, between Rondane and Dovrefjell-Sunndalsfjella National Park was also opened. Following the expansion, it is now only approximately 1 kilometre (0.62 mi) from the northern border of Rondane to the southern border of Dovre National Park, and large sections of adjacent mountain areas are protected by the three parks.

== Geology ==
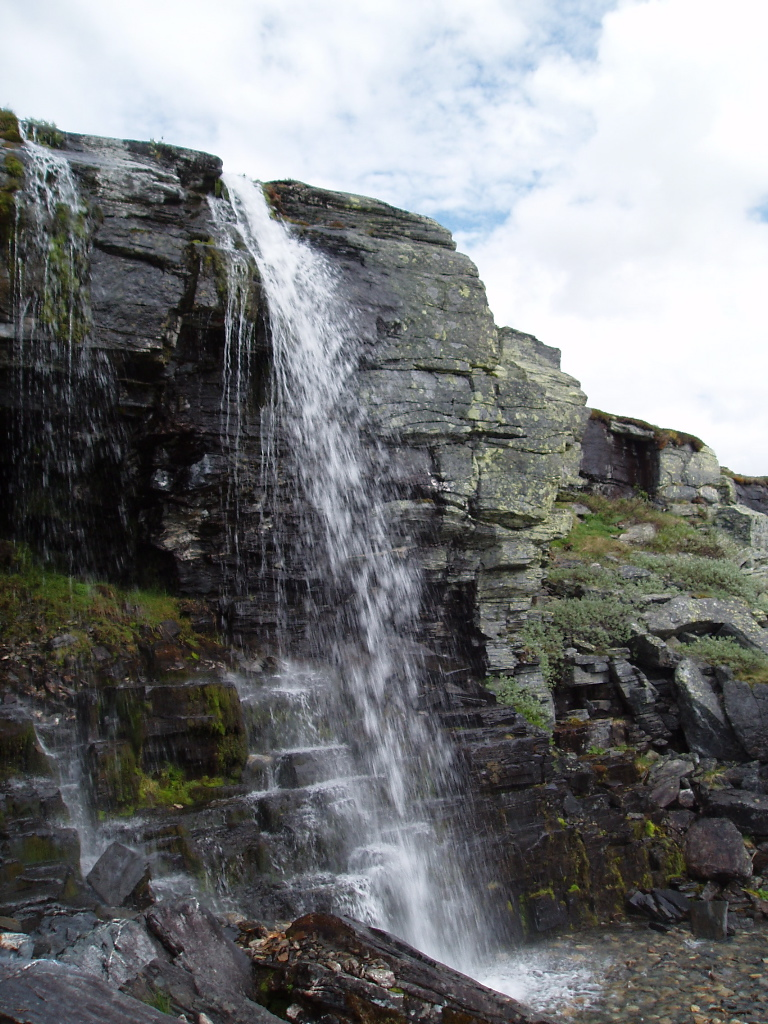
Geology in Rondane; the rock shows signs of sedimentation.

The bedrock in Rondane comes from a shallow sea floor, created 500 to 600 million years ago. From this, changes in the Earth's crust created a mountain area of metamorphic rock and quartz. There are no fossils found in Rondane today and so it is thought the sea where the rock came from contained no animal life.

The present landscape was mostly formed by the last ice age, nine to ten thousand years ago. During that period, significant amounts of ice accumulated, and it is theorized that this ice underwent gradual melting in alternating cycles of thawing and ice build-up.

The ice melting cycles occurred rapidly, digging deep river valleys.

Rondane contains a few small canyons which were created by the rapid ice melting, most prominently Jutulhogget and Vesle-Ula.

== Biology ==
Rondane is one of the few places in Scandinavia and Europe where wild mountain reindeer (as opposed to the domestic breed) are found. The Directorate for Nature Management regards Rondane as "especially important as a life supporting area for the native reindeer". It is estimated that approximately 2000 to 4000 reindeer live in Rondane and the nearby Dovre area. To protect the reindeer population in their core area during the last ten years, hiking trails have been moved. The park was also enlarged in 2003 to provide increased protection for the reindeer.

Other large animals, including roe deer and elk are commonplace along the rims of the park and occasionally muskox from Dovre can be seen. Wolverines, northern lynxes, and a small population of Eurasian brown bears are also present, while Eurasian wolves are rare.

The reindeer largely rely on the lichen and reindeer moss that grow together with heather and hardy grass on the quite arid and nutrient-poor stony plateaus. The lichen provide food for the reindeer, but also fertilize the earth, making it possible for less hardy plants to grow, and mice and lemmings to feed. One of the flower species to survive very well is the Glacier Crowfoot, found up to an elevation of 1,700 metres (5,600 ft).

== Tourism ==
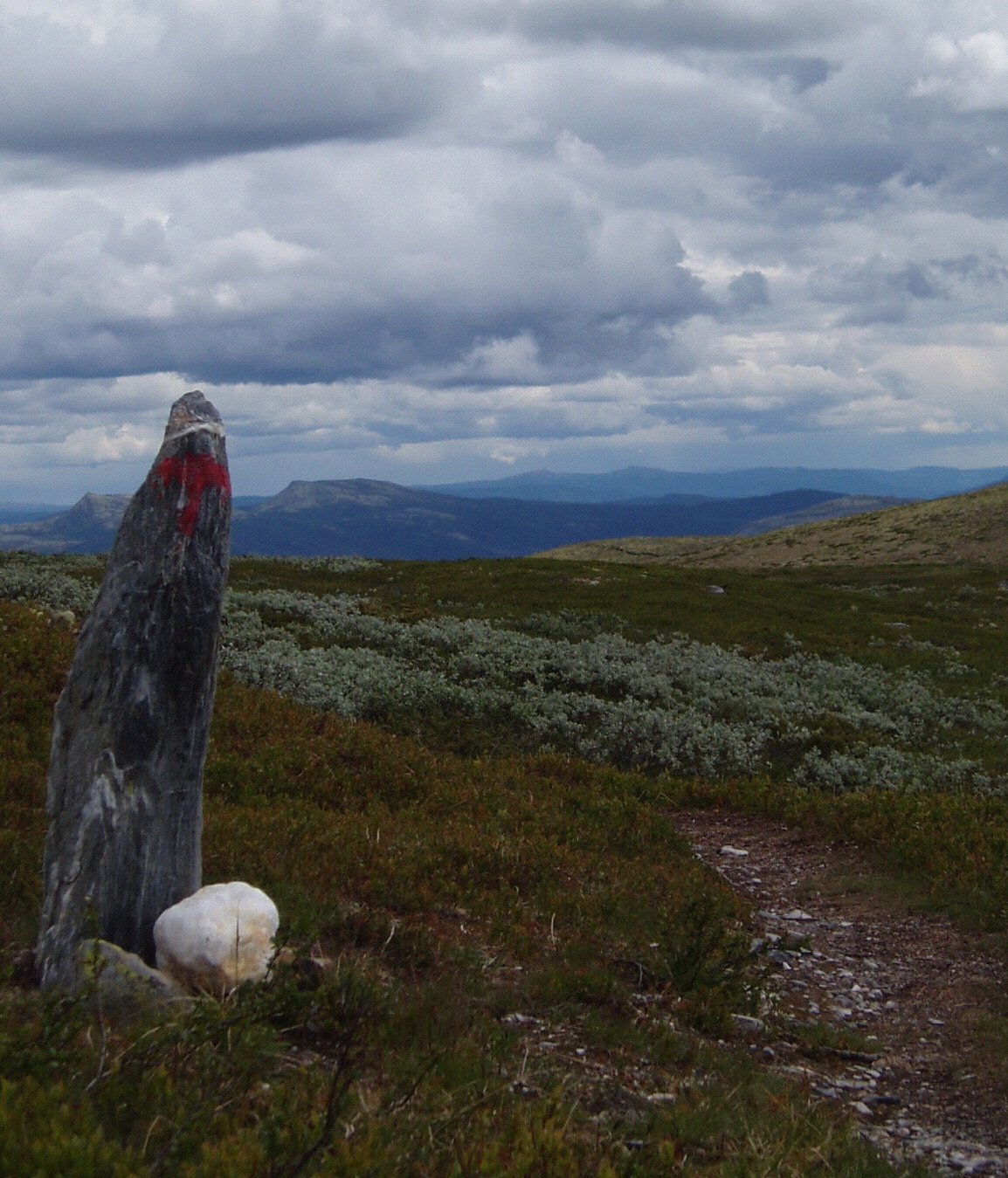
Red T-markings show the way on marked trails.

Visitors to Rondane National Park are permitted to engage in hiking and camping throughout the park, with the exception of areas immediately surrounding cabins.

The park is a motor traffic-free zone, and it operates under minimal special regulations. Licensed individuals are granted the opportunity to fish and hunt within the park's boundaries.

The Norwegian Mountain Touring Association (DNT) is an association that owns and manages a network of mountain cabins in the service of hikers. In Rondane, there is a central cabin by the southern end of Lake Rondvatnet, Rondvassbu. There is also Dørålseter and Bjørnhollia at the northern and eastern rims of the park. All three cabins are staffed, and provide food and limited accommodation (possible to book beforehand). There are also unstaffed cabins in the Park, like Eldåbu where a key is needed.

DNT also mark trails in the Park, with red Ts that are easy to spot. The T-trails lead the way cabin-to-cabin, as well as marking the path to some of the peaks close to Rondvatnet. Recently, some trails have moved slightly to avoid the core areas of the wild reindeer.

The service cabins are also open during the winter season, although they are sometimes only self-serviced off season. Ski trails are marked and sometimes prepared, either by DNT or some of the nearby hotels and skiing resorts.

== Rondane in literature ==
The landscapes of Rondane have inspired many Norwegian writers. Probably the best-known work is Peer Gynt (1867), a play by Henrik Ibsen, which is partly set in Rondane:

Act 2, Scene lV
(Among the Ronde mountains. Sunset. Shining snowpeaks all around.
Peer Gynt enters, dizzy and bewildered.)
Peer

Tower over tower arises!
Hei, what a glittering gate!
Stand! Will you stand! It's drifting
further and further away!
...

With this scene, Ibsen wrote Rondane into one of the 19th centuries better-known plays and made Rondane a symbol for Norway.

Peter Christen Asbjørnsen, writer and gatherer of Norwegian folk tales in the mid-19th century, collected many stories connected with Rondane, including Peer Gynt, the story that inspired Ibsen.

A third writer who set one of his famous works in Rondane is the poet Aasmund Olavsson Vinje with his poem Ved Rundarne.

== Name ==
Rondane is the finite plural of the word rond. Several mountains in the area have the ending -ronden (Digerronden, Høgronden, Midtronden, Storronden and Vinjeronden), and this is the finite singular of the same word. The word rond was probably originally the name of the long and narrow lake Rondvatnet ('Rond water/lake') - the mountains around it were then named after this lake. For the meaning see under Randsfjorden.

== See also ==
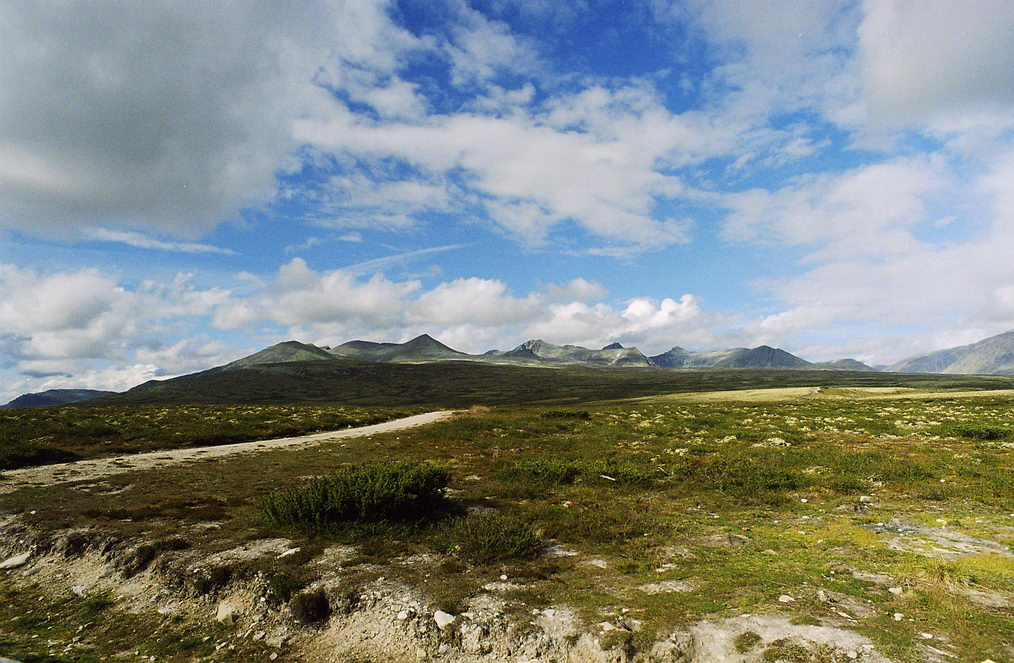
Rondane

- Tourism in Norway
- Norwegian Trekking Association
- List of national parks of Norway
- Dovre National Park
- Dovrefjell-Sunndalsfjella National Park
- Peer Gynt
