= Lågvasstinden =

Mountain in Lesja, Norway

- Interactive map of the mountain

Highest point
- Elevation: 1,831 m (6,007 ft)
- Prominence: 77 m (253 ft)
- Isolation: 1.9 km (1.2 mi)
- Coordinates: 62°18′57″N 8°58′32″E

Geography
- Location: Innlandet, Norway
- Parent range: Dovrefjell

Lågvasstinden is a mountain in Lesja Municipality in Innlandet county, Norway. The 1,831-metre (6,007 ft) tall mountain lies within Dovrefjell-Sunndalsfjella National Park, about 22 kilometres (14 mi) northeast of the village of Lesja. The mountain is surrounded by several other mountains including Grøvudalstinden which is about 4 kilometres (2.5 mi) to the north, Salhøa which is about 5 kilometres (3.1 mi) to the northeast, Skuleggen which is 8 kilometres (5.0 mi) to the northeast, Drugshøe which is about 7.5 kilometres (4.7 mi) to the east, Mjogsjøhøe which is about 8.5 kilometres (5.3 mi) to the southeast, Hatten which lies about 11 kilometres (6.8 mi) to the south, Stortverråtinden and Vesltverråtinden which are about 3 kilometres (1.9 mi) to the southwest, Høgtunga which is about 4.3 kilometres (2.7 mi) to the west, and Eggekollan and Grønliskarstinden which are about 7.5 kilometres (4.7 mi) to the northwest.

== See also ==
- List of mountains of Norway
