= Vesltverråtinden =

Mountain in Lesja, Norway

- Interactive map of the mountain

Highest point
- Elevation: 1,805 m (5,922 ft)
- Prominence: 90 m (300 ft)
- Isolation: 1.3 km (0.81 mi)
- Coordinates: 62°17′02″N 8°56′24″E

Geography
- Location: Innlandet, Norway
- Parent range: Dovrefjell

Vesltverråtinden is a mountain in Lesja Municipality in Innlandet county, Norway. The 1,805-metre (5,922 ft) tall mountain lies within Dovrefjell-Sunndalsfjella National Park, about 20 kilometres (12 mi) north of the village of Lesja. The mountain Stortverråtinden immediately to the northeast of this mountain. The mountain is surrounded by several other mountains including Sjongshøi which is about 4.5 kilometres (2.8 mi) to the southwest, Hatten which is about 9 kilometres (5.6 mi) to the south, Mjogsjøhøe and Mjogsjøvike which are about 9 kilometres (5.6 mi) to the southeast, Svånåtindene which lies about 12 kilometres (7.5 mi) to the east, Drugshøe which lies about 9 kilometres (5.6 mi) to the northeast, Lågvasstinden which lies about 3 kilometres (1.9 mi) to the north, and Høgtunga which is about 3.6 kilometres (2.2 mi) to the west.

== See also ==
- List of mountains of Norway
