= Nørdre Svånåtinden =

Mountain in Lesja, Norway

- Interactive map of the mountain

Highest point
- Elevation: 2,004 m (6,575 ft)
- Prominence: 63 m (207 ft)
- Parent peak: Storstyggesvånåtinden
- Isolation: 0.58 km (0.36 mi)
- Coordinates: 62°18′16″N 9°10′44″E

Geography
- Location: Innlandet, Norway
- Parent range: Svånåtindene

Nørdre Svånåtinden is a mountain in Lesja Municipality in Innlandet county, Norway. The 2,004-metre (6,575 ft) tall mountain lies within Dovrefjell-Sunndalsfjella National Park, about 20 kilometres (12 mi) north of the village of Dombås in the Svånåtindene mountains. The mountain is surrounded by several other mountains including Snøhetta which is about 4 kilometres (2.5 mi) to the northeast, Storstyggesvånåtinden which is about 2 kilometres (1.2 mi) to the south, Skredahøin which is about 3 kilometres (1.9 mi) to the south, Mjogsjøhøe and Mjogsjøoksli which are about 7 kilometres (4.3 mi) to the southwest, Drugshøe which is about 4 kilometres (2.5 mi) to the northwest, and Store Langvasstinden which is about 2 kilometres (1.2 mi) to the north.

== See also ==
- List of mountains of Norway
