= Grøvudalstinden =

Mountain in Lesja, Norway

- Interactive map of the mountain

Highest point
- Elevation: 1,844 m (6,050 ft)
- Prominence: 85 m (279 ft)
- Isolation: 1.4 km (0.87 mi)
- Coordinates: 62°21′14″N 8°58′16″E

Geography
- Location: Innlandet, Norway
- Parent range: Dovrefjell

Grøvudalstinden is a mountain in Lesja Municipality in Innlandet county, Norway. The 1,844-metre (6,050 ft) tall mountain lies within Dovrefjell-Sunndalsfjella National Park, about 30 kilometres (19 mi) north of the village of Lesja. The mountain is surrounded by several other mountains including Salhøa which is about 2 kilometres (1.2 mi) to the east, Lågvasstinden which is about 4 kilometres (2.5 mi) to the south, Stortverråtinden which is 7.5 kilometres (4.7 mi) to the south-southwest, Høgtunga which is about 7 kilometres (4.3 mi) to the southwest, Eggekollan which is about 6 kilometres (3.7 mi) to the west, and Grønliskarstinden which is about 5 kilometres (3.1 mi) to the northwest.

== See also ==
- List of mountains of Norway
