= Brunkollen =

Mountain in Innlandet/Trøndelag, Norway

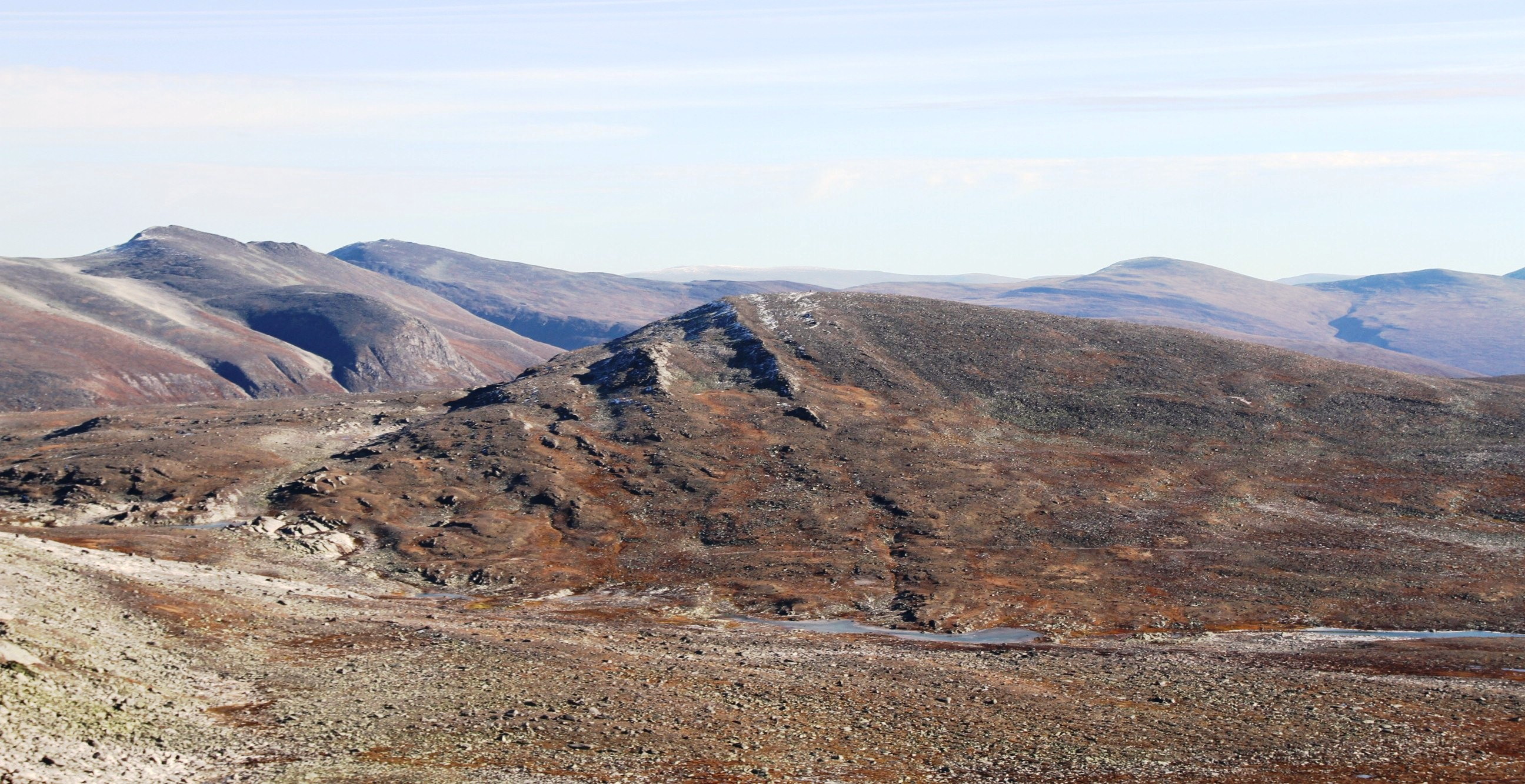
- Brunkollen in back right of photo

Highest point
- Elevation: 1,665 m (5,463 ft)
- Prominence: 118 m (387 ft)
- Parent peak: Snøhetta
- Isolation: 3.2 km (2.0 mi)
- Coordinates: 62°19′04″N 9°21′38″E

Geography
- Interactive map of the mountain
- Location: Innlandet and Trøndelag, Norway
- Parent range: Dovrefjell

Brunkollen is a mountain on the border of Dovre Municipality in Innlandet county and Oppdal Municipality in Trøndelag county in Norway. The 1,665-metre (5,463 ft) tall mountain is located in the Dovrefjell mountains and inside the Dovrefjell-Sunndalsfjella National Park, about 30 kilometres (19 mi) north of the village of Dombås and about 14 kilometres (8.7 mi) northwest of the village of Hjerkinn. The mountain is surrounded by several other notable mountains including Tverrfjellet to the southeast, Einøvlingseggen and Skredahøin to the southwest, Snøhetta and Storstyggesvånåtinden to the west.

== See also ==
- List of mountains of Norway
