= Stortverråtinden =

Mountain in Lesja, Norway

- Interactive map of the mountain

Highest point
- Elevation: 1,949 m (6,394 ft)
- Prominence: 314 m (1,030 ft)
- Isolation: 4.5 km (2.8 mi)
- Coordinates: 62°17′33″N 8°57′24″E

Geography
- Location: Innlandet, Norway
- Parent range: Dovrefjell

Stortverråtinden is a mountain in Lesja Municipality in Innlandet county, Norway. The 1,949-metre (6,394 ft) tall mountain lies within Dovrefjell-Sunndalsfjella National Park, about 20 kilometres (12 mi) north of the village of Lesja. The mountain Vesltverråtinden immediately to the southwest of this mountain. The mountain is surrounded by several other mountains including Sjongshøe which is about 5 kilometres (3.1 mi) to the southwest, Hatten which is about 9.5 kilometres (5.9 mi) to the south, Mjogsjøhøe and Mjogsjøoksli which are about 9 kilometres (5.6 mi) to the southeast, Svånåtindan which lies about 12 kilometres (7.5 mi) to the east, Drugshøe which lies about 9 kilometres (5.6 mi) to the northeast, Lågvasstinden which lies about 3 kilometres (1.9 mi) to the north, and Høgtunga which is about 3.6 kilometres (2.2 mi) to the west.

== See also ==
- List of mountains of Norway
