= Grønliskarstinden =

Mountain in Lesja, Norway

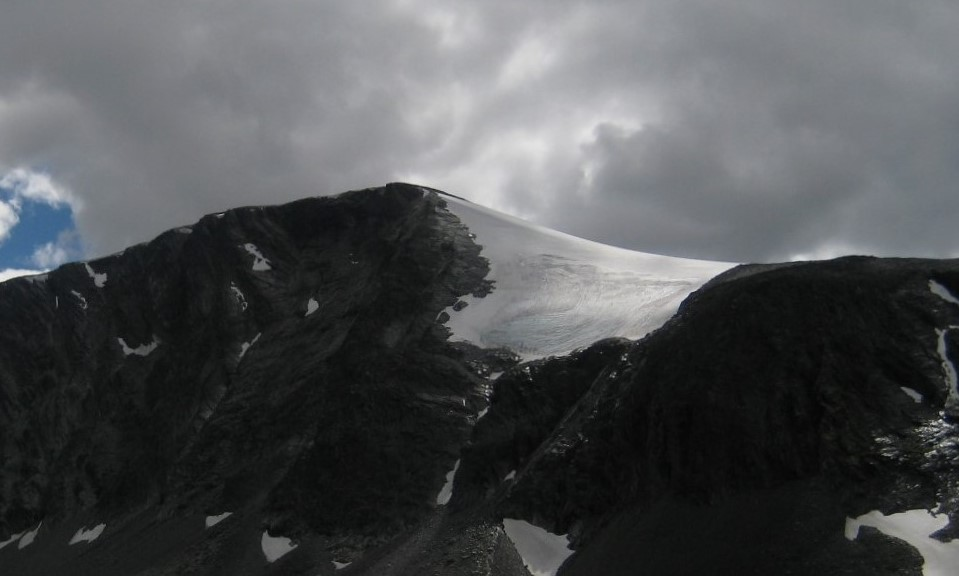

Highest point
- Elevation: 1,926 m (6,319 ft)
- Prominence: 306 m (1,004 ft)
- Isolation: 8.5 km (5.3 mi) to Sørhellhøe
- Coordinates: 62°22′32″N 8°53′23″E

Geography
- Interactive map of the mountain
- Location: Innlandet and Møre og Romsdal, Norway
- Parent range: Dovrefjell

Grønliskarstinden is a mountain on the border of Lesja Municipality in Innlandet county and Sunndal Municipality in Møre og Romsdal county in Norway. The 1,926-metre (6,319 ft) tall mountain lies within the Dovrefjell-Sunndalsfjella National Park, about 36 kilometres (22 mi) north of Dombås and about 37 kilometres (23 mi) southeast of Sunndalsøra. The mountain lies in the Dovrefjell mountains, surrounded by a number of other mountains including Storskrymten which is about 9 kilometres (5.6 mi) to the east, Salhøa which is about 6.5 kilometres (4.0 mi) to the southeast, Høgtunga which is about 7.5 kilometres (4.7 mi) to the south, Eggekollan which is about 3 kilometres (1.9 mi) to the southwest, and Søre Svarthåmåren and Geitåhøe which are about 5.6 kilometres (3.5 mi) to the west.

== See also ==
- List of mountains of Norway
