= Sjongshøe =

Mountain in Lesja, Norway

- Sjongshøi / Sjongshøa
- Interactive map of the mountain

Highest point
- Elevation: 1,954 m (6,411 ft)
- Prominence: 512 m (1,680 ft)
- Isolation: 13.1 km (8.1 mi)
- Coordinates: 62°15′19″N 8°54′43″E

Geography
- Location: Innlandet, Norway
- Parent range: Dovrefjell

Sjongshøe is a mountain in Lesja Municipality in Innlandet county, Norway. The 1,954-metre (6,411 ft) tall mountain lies within Dovrefjell-Sunndalsfjella National Park, about 15 kilometres (9.3 mi) north of the village of Lesja. The mountain is surrounded by several other mountains including Hatten which is about 7 kilometres (4.3 mi) to the southeast, Mjogsjøhøe and Mjogsjøoksli which are about 10 kilometres (6.2 mi) to the east, Stortverråtinden and Vesltverråtinden which are about 4 kilometres (2.5 mi) to the northeast, Høgtunga which is about 5.5 kilometres (3.4 mi) to the north, and Sørhellhøin which is about 6 kilometres (3.7 mi) to the northwest.

== See also ==
- List of mountains of Norway
