= Bruri =

Mountain in Lesja, Norway

- Interactive map of the mountain

Highest point
- Elevation: 2,001 m (6,565 ft)
- Prominence: 182 m (597 ft)
- Parent peak: Storstyggesvånåtinden
- Isolation: 0.854 km (0.531 mi) to Svånåtindan
- Coordinates: 62°17′50″N 9°12′01″E

Geography
- Location: Innlandet, Norway
- Parent range: Svånåtindene

Bruri is a mountain in Lesja Municipality in Innlandet county, Norway. The 2,001-metre (6,565 ft) tall mountain lies in the Svånåtindene mountains. It lies about 1.5 kilometres (0.93 mi) northeast of the mountain Storstyggesvånåtinden and about 2 kilometres (1.2 mi) south of the mountains Store Langvasstinden and Larstinden. There are two small glaciers on the west side of Bruri.

== See also ==
- List of mountains of Norway
