= Sørhellhøe =

Mountain in Lesja, Norway

- Sørhellhøi / Sørhellhøa
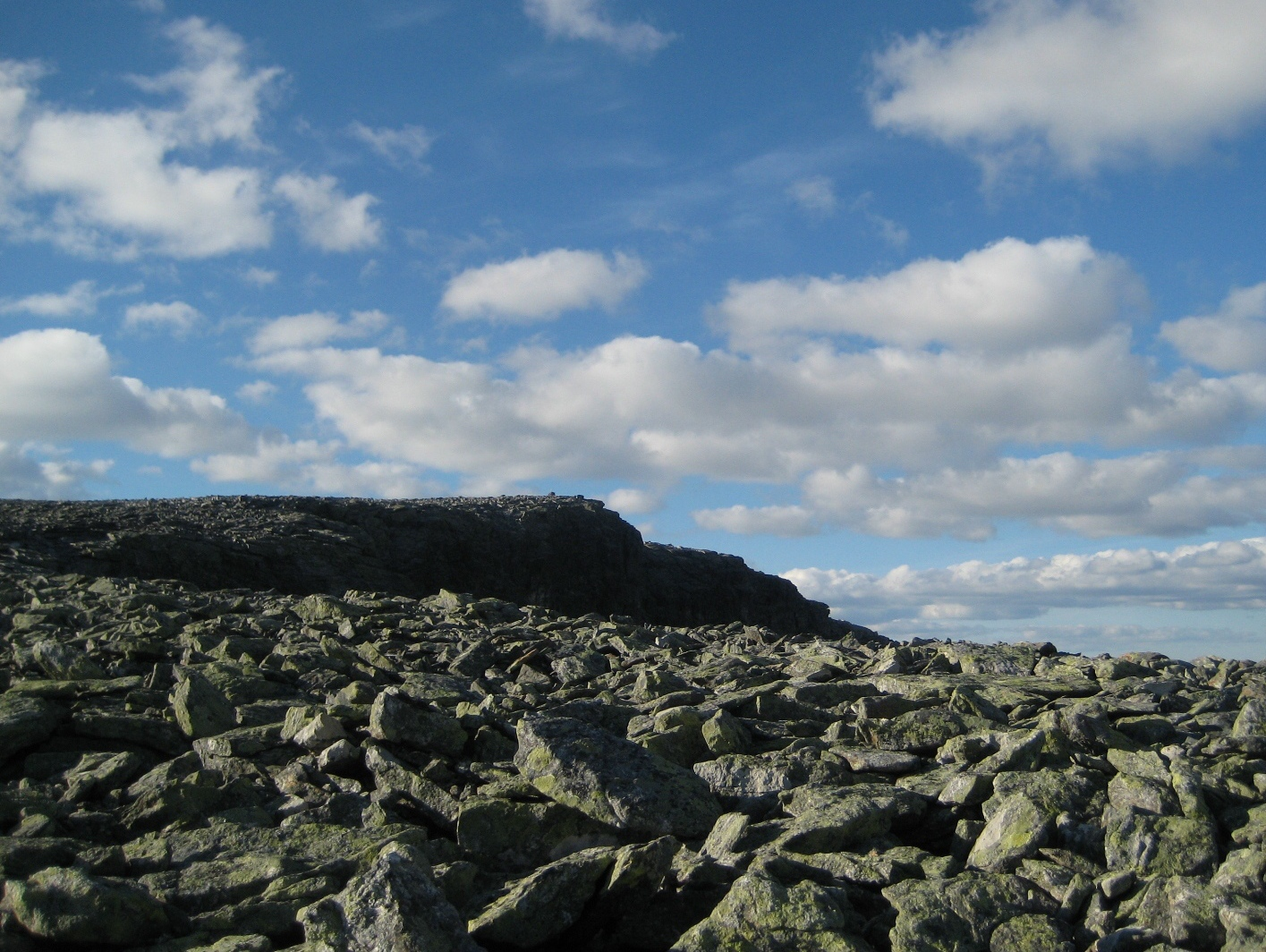

Highest point
- Elevation: 1,951 m (6,401 ft)
- Prominence: 340 m (1,120 ft)
- Isolation: 8.6 km (5.3 mi) to Sjongshøe
- Coordinates: 62°18′51″N 8°48′31″E

Geography
- Interactive map of the mountain
- Location: Innlandet, Norway
- Parent range: Dovrefjell

Sørhellhøe is a mountain in Lesja Municipality in Innlandet county, Norway. The 1,951-metre (6,401 ft) tall mountain lies within the Dovrefjell-Sunndalsfjella National Park, about 20 kilometres (12 mi) north of the village of Lesja. The mountain lies in the Dovrefjell mountains. It is surrounded by a number of other notable mountains including Høgtunga which is about 4.5 kilometres (2.8 mi) to the east, Sjongshøe which is about 8 kilometres (5.0 mi) to the southeast, Geitåhøe which is about 4.5 kilometres (2.8 mi) to the north, Eggekollan which is about 4.7 kilometres (2.9 mi) to the north, and Salhøa which is about 12 kilometres (7.5 mi) to the northeast. A lower, secondary peak on this mountain is Sørhellhøin, located about 4 kilometres (2.5 mi) south of the main peak.

== See also ==
- List of mountains of Norway
