= Sørhellhøin =

Mountain in Lesja, Norway

- Sørhellhøa
- Interactive map of the mountain

Highest point
- Elevation: 1,656 m (5,433 ft)
- Prominence: 38 m (125 ft)
- Parent peak: Sjongshøe
- Isolation: 1.3 km (0.81 mi)
- Coordinates: 62°16′39″N 8°48′38″E

Geography
- Location: Innlandet, Norway
- Parent range: Dovrefjell

Sørhellhøin is a mountain in Lesja Municipality in Innlandet county, Norway. The 1,656-metre (5,433 ft) tall mountain lies within the Dovrefjell-Sunndalsfjella National Park, about 20 kilometres (12 mi) north of the village of Lesja. The mountain lies in the Dovrefjell mountains. It is surrounded by a number of other notable mountains including Sørhellhøe which is about 4.5 kilometres (2.8 mi) to the north, Høgtunga which is about 5 kilometres (3.1 mi) to the northeast, Stortverråtinden which is about 7 kilometres (4.3 mi) to the east, and Sjongshøe which is about 6 kilometres (3.7 mi) to the southeast The lake Aursjøen lies about 3 kilometres (1.9 mi) to the south and west.

== See also ==
- List of mountains of Norway
