= Einøvlingseggen =

Mountain in Dovre, Norway

- Interactive map of the mountain

Highest point
- Elevation: 1,676 m (5,499 ft)
- Prominence: 441 m (1,447 ft)
- Parent peak: Snøhetta
- Isolation: 2.6 km (1.6 mi)
- Coordinates: 62°14′07″N 9°18′18″E

Geography
- Location: Innlandet, Norway
- Parent range: Dovrefjell

Einøvlingseggen is a mountain in Innlandet county, Norway. The 1,676-metre (5,499 ft) tall mountain is located in the Dovrefjell mountains and inside the Dovrefjell-Sunndalsfjella National Park. The mountain is located on the border of Dovre Municipality and Lesja Municipality, about 20 kilometres (12 mi) northeast of the village of Dombås and about 12 kilometres (7.5 mi) west of the village of Hjerkinn. The mountain is surrounded by several other notable mountains including Tverrfjellet to the east, Brunkollen and Snøhetta to the north, and Skredahøin and Storstyggesvånåtinden to the northwest.

== See also ==
- List of mountains of Norway
