= Larstinden =

Mountain in Innlandet, Norway

- Store Larstind (historic)
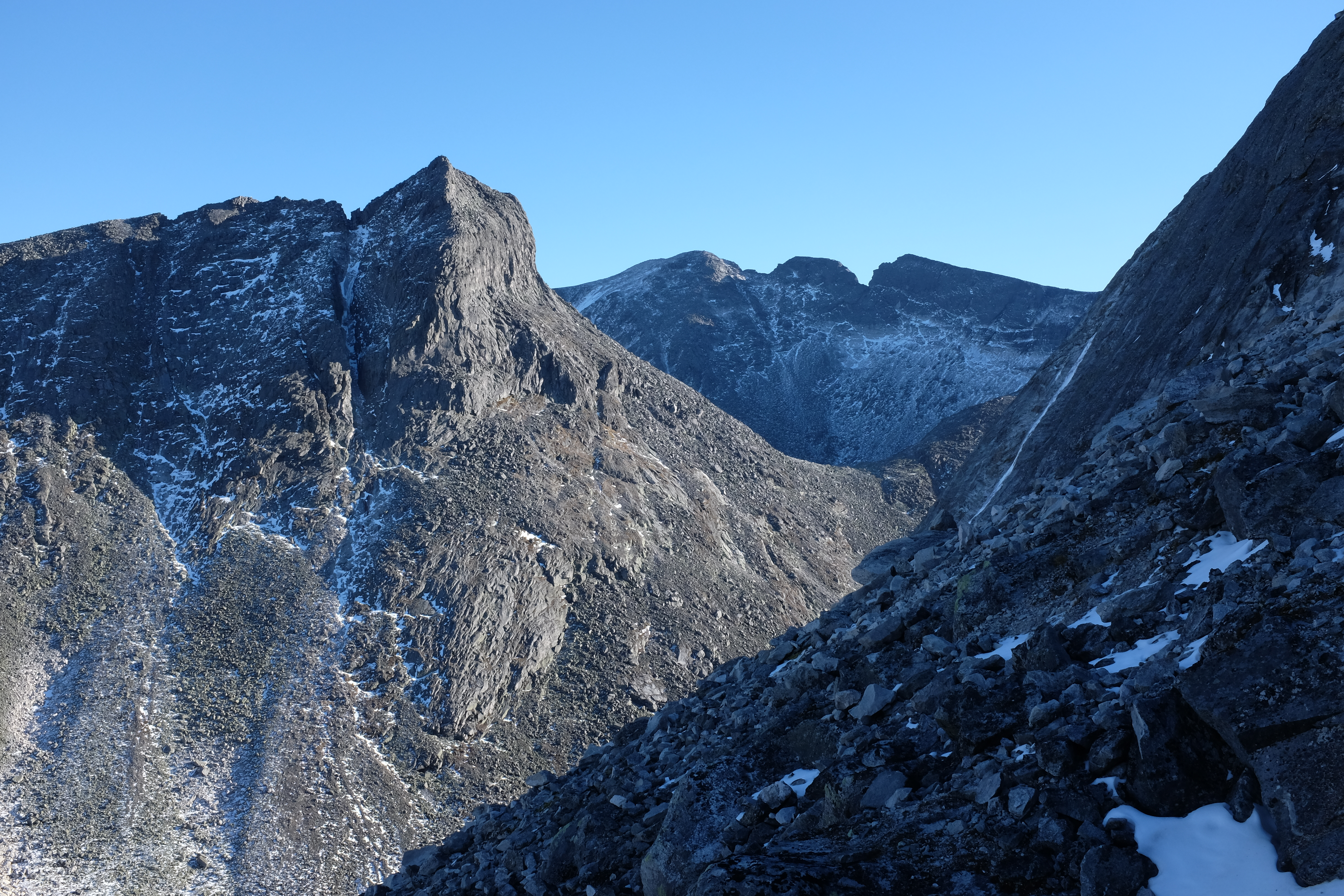
- View of Larstinden seen from Store Langvasstinden

Highest point
- Elevation: 2,108 m (6,916 ft)
- Prominence: 266 m (873 ft)
- Parent peak: Snøhetta
- Isolation: 1.1 km (0.68 mi)
- Coordinates: 62°19′13″N 9°13′19″E

Geography
- Interactive map of the mountain
- Location: Innlandet, Norway
- Parent range: Dovrefjell

Larstinden is a mountain in Lesja Municipality in Innlandet county, Norway. The 2,108-metre (6,916 ft) tall mountain lies within Dovrefjell-Sunndalsfjella National Park, about 30 kilometres (19 mi) north of the village of Dombås. The mountain is surrounded by several other mountains including Drugshøi which is about 3 kilometres (1.9 mi) to the northwest, Store Langvasstinden which is about 1.1 kilometres (0.68 mi) to the west, Nordre Svånåtinden which is about 2 kilometres (1.2 mi) to the southwest, Storstyggesvånåtinden which is 3.5 kilometres (2.2 mi) to the south, and Snøhetta which is about 3 kilometres (1.9 mi) to the east.

== See also ==
- List of mountains of Norway
