= Bjørnahøe =

Mountain in Lesja, Norway

- Bjørnahøi (unofficial)
- Interactive map of the mountain

Highest point
- Elevation: 1,687 m (5,535 ft)
- Prominence: 67 m (220 ft)
- Parent peak: Hatten
- Isolation: 1.5 km (0.93 mi)
- Coordinates: 62°11′49″N 8°59′57″E

Geography
- Location: Innlandet, Norway

Bjørnahøe is a mountain in Lesja Municipality in Innlandet county, Norway. The 1,687-metre (5,535 ft) tall peak lies about 2.3 kilometres (1.4 mi) to the southwest of its parent peak, Hatten. The mountain lies within the Dovrefjell-Sunndalsfjella National Park, about 15 kilometres (9.3 mi) north of the village of Dombås.

== See also ==
- List of mountains of Norway
