= Skuleggen =

Mountain in Lesja, Norway

- Interactive map of the mountain

Highest point
- Elevation: 1,726 m (5,663 ft)
- Prominence: 146 m (479 ft)
- Parent peak: Storskrymten
- Isolation: 1.1 km (0.68 mi)
- Coordinates: 62°21′51″N 9°05′32″E

Geography
- Location: Innlandet and Trøndelag, Norway
- Parent range: Dovrefjell

Skuleggen is a mountain in Lesja Municipality in Innlandet county, Norway. The 1,726-metre (5,663 ft) tall mountain lies within Dovrefjell-Sunndalsfjella National Park, about 30 kilometres (19 mi) north of the village of Dombås. The mountain is surrounded by several other mountains including Storskrymten which is about 2 kilometres (1.2 mi) to the northwest, Salhøa which is about 3 kilometres (1.9 mi) to the west, Lågvasstinden which is 8 kilometres (5.0 mi) to the southwest, and Drugshøe which is about 5 kilometres (3.1 mi) to the south.

== See also ==
- List of mountains of Norway
