= Storskrymten =

Mountain in Trøndelag, Norway

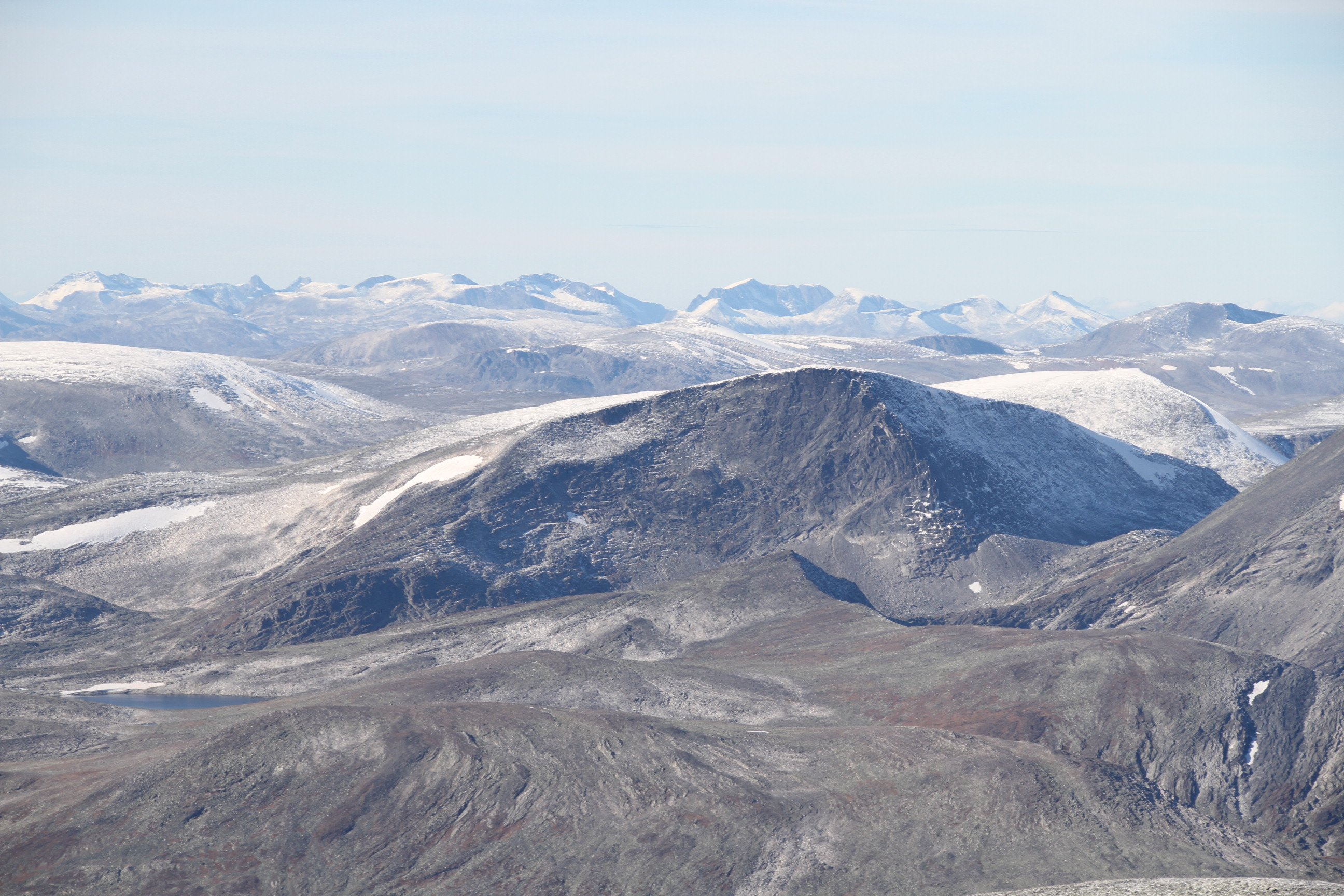

Highest point
- Elevation: 1,985 m (6,512 ft)
- Prominence: 610 m (2,000 ft)
- Isolation: 9 km (5.6 mi) to Store Langvasstinden
- Listing: #1 in Trøndelag county #2 in Møre og Romsdal county #5 at List of highest points of Norwegian counties
- Coordinates: 62.3725°N 09.0618°E

Geography
- Interactive map of the mountain
- Location: Innlandet, Møre og Romsdal and Trøndelag, Norway
- Parent range: Dovrefjell
- Topo map: 1419 I Storskrymten

Storskrymten is a 1,985-metre (6,512 ft) tall mountain in Norway. The top of the mountain is a tripoint for three counties and three municipalities: Oppdal Municipality (Trøndelag county), Sunndal Municipality (Møre og Romsdal county), and Lesja Municipality (Innlandet county). The nearest urban areas are the village of Sunndalsøra which is located about 42 kilometres (26 mi) to the northwest, Dombås which is located about 32 kilometres (20 mi) to the south, and Oppdal which is about 40 kilometres (25 mi) to the northeast.

It is the highest mountain in Trøndelag county as well as the highest mountain in Sunndal municipality. Less than 2 kilometres (1.2 mi) east of Storskrymten is the mountain Litlskrymten which means "the little Skrymt". It is located in the Dovrefjell mountains and it is inside the Dovrefjell–Sunndalsfjella National Park. The mountain Salhøa lies about 2.5 kilometres (1.6 mi) to the southwest, along the Sunndal-Lesja municipal border. The mountain is surrounded by several other mountains including Salhøa and Grøvudalstinden to the west, Skuleggen to the southeast, and Svartdalskollen to the northeast.

== Name ==
The first element is stor which means "big" and the last element is the finite form of skrymt which means "uncanny thing", "fright", or "scare" (the hillsides of the mountain are extremely steep).

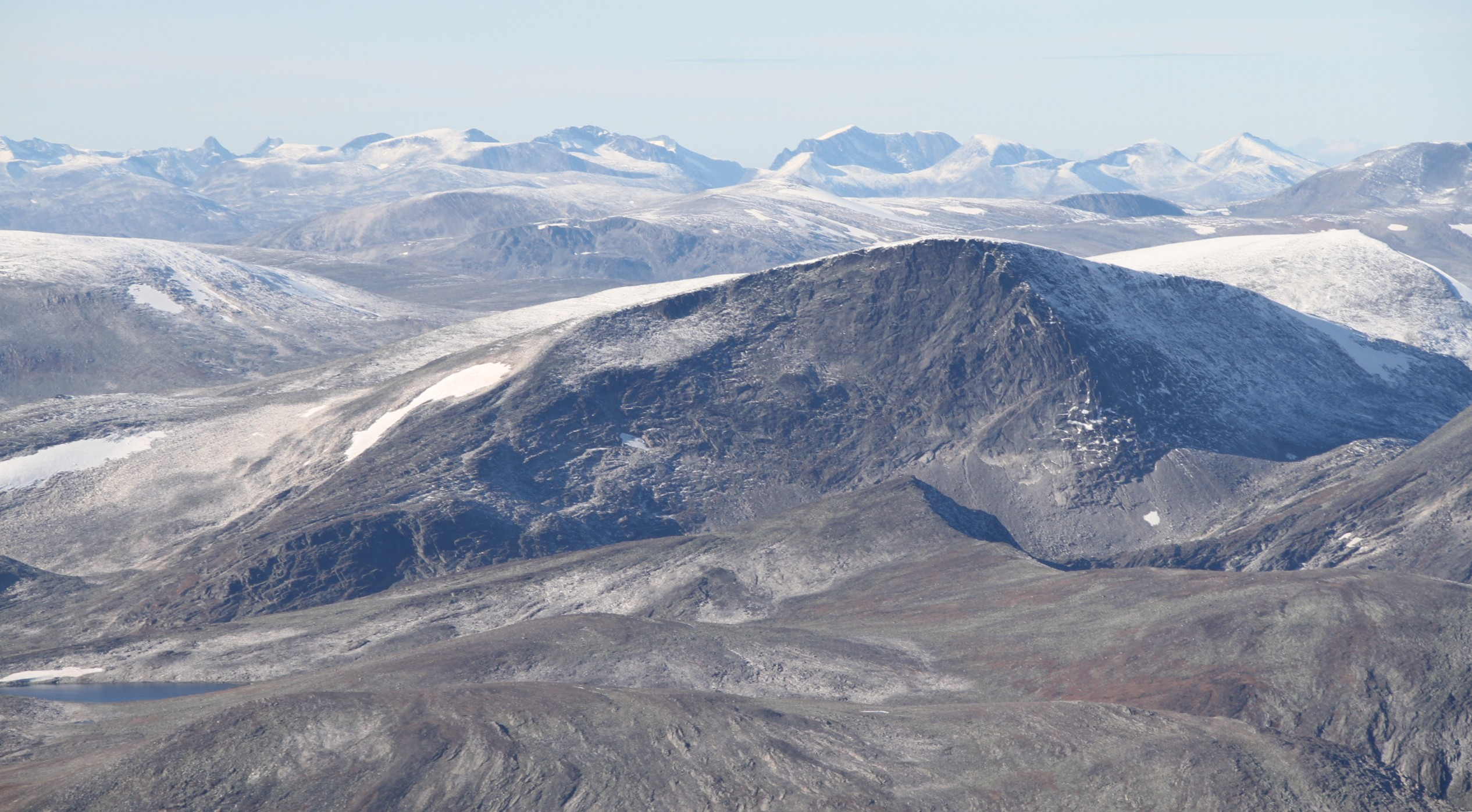

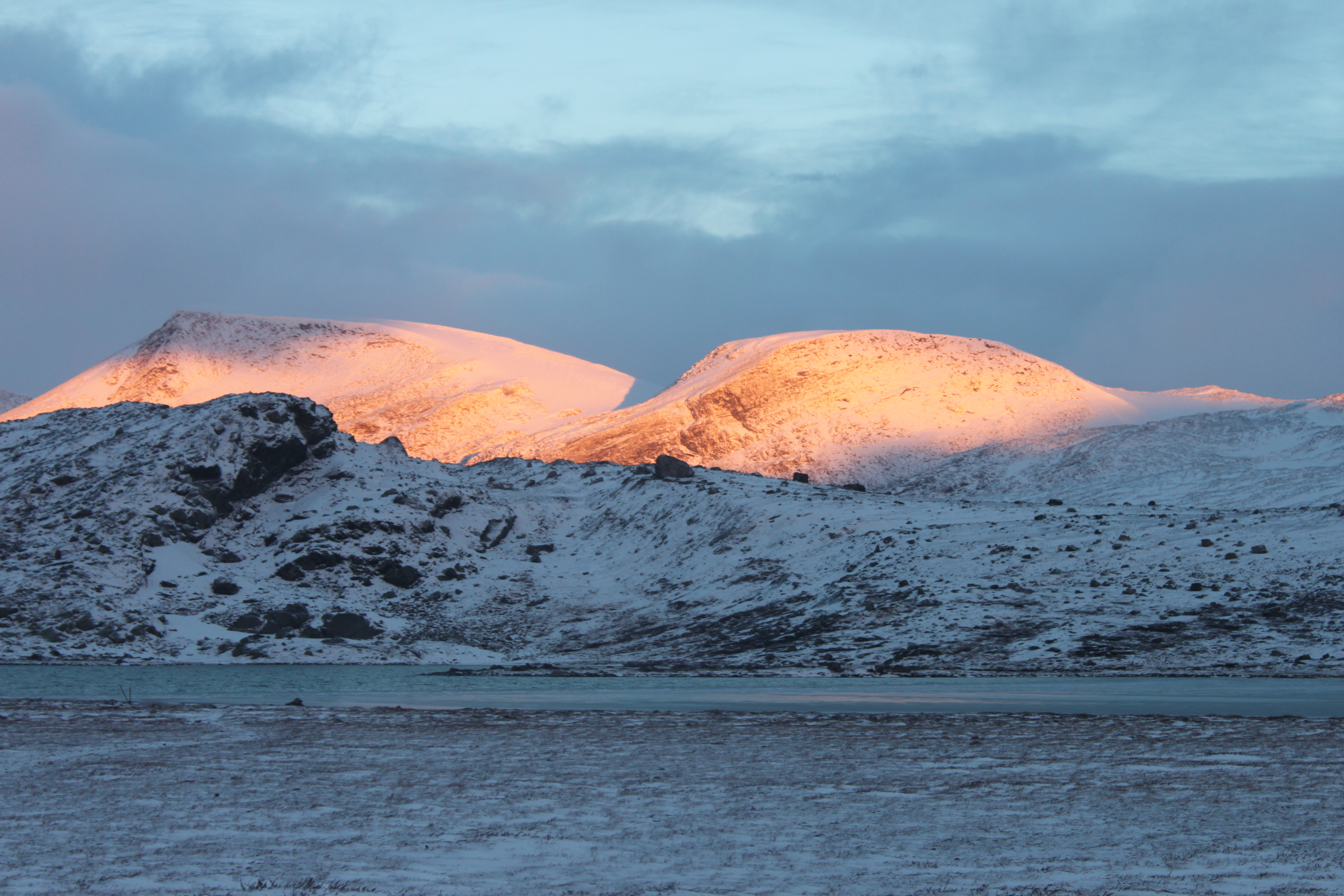

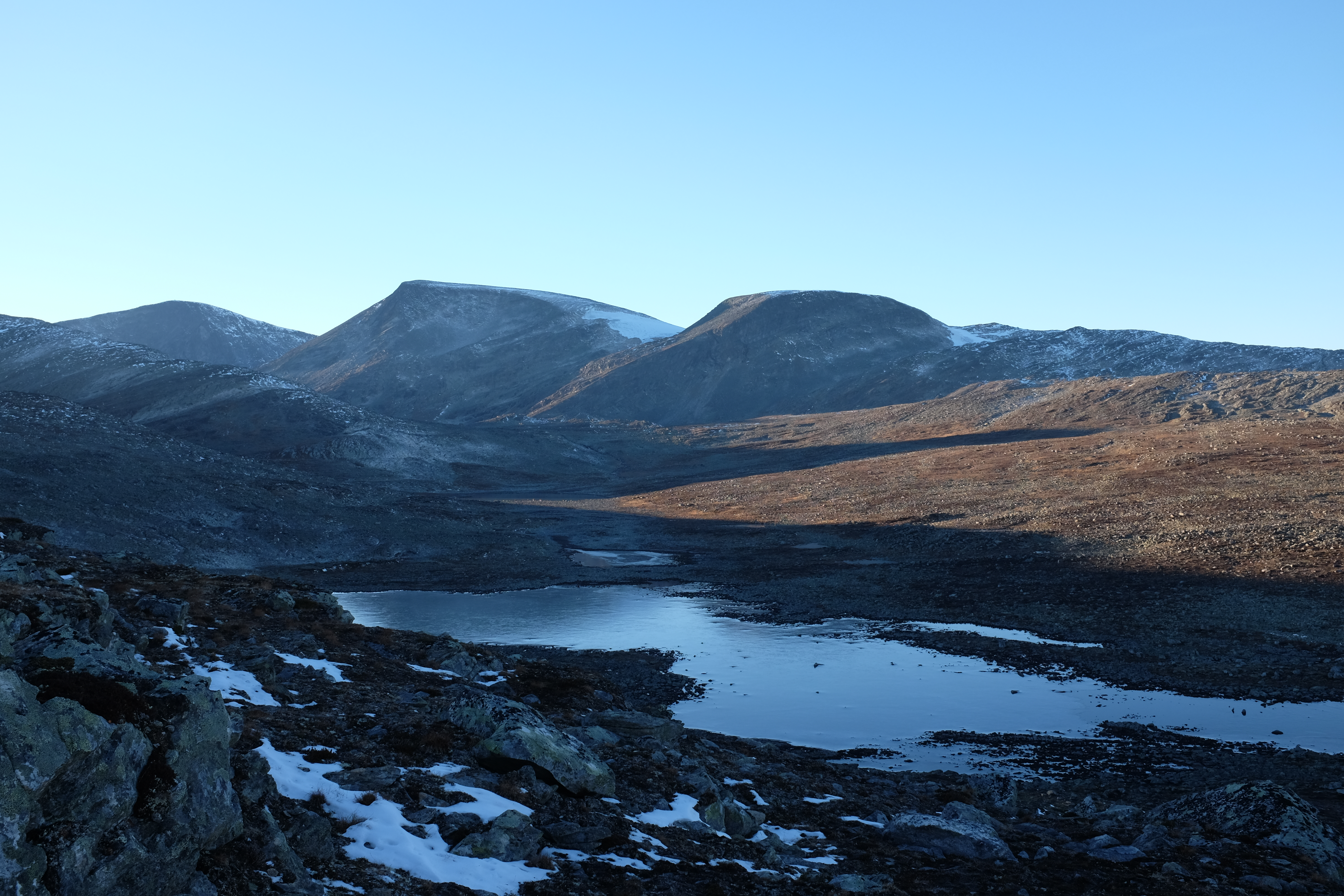

== See also ==
- List of mountains of Norway
