= Geitåhøe =

Mountain in Lesja, Norway

- Geitåhøa / Geitåhøi
- Interactive map of the mountain

Highest point
- Elevation: 1,884 m (6,181 ft)
- Prominence: 190 m (620 ft)
- Parent peak: Grønliskarstinden
- Isolation: 5.4 km (3.4 mi) to Sørhellhøe
- Coordinates: 62°21′23″N 8°47′14″E

Geography
- Location: Innlandet, Norway
- Parent range: Dovrefjell

Geitåhøe is a mountain in Lesja Municipality in Innlandet county, Norway. The 1,884-metre (6,181 ft) tall mountain is located within the Dovrefjell-Sunndalsfjella National Park, about 40 kilometres (25 mi) north of Dombås and about 36 kilometres (22 mi) south of Sunndalsøra. The mountain is surrounded by other mountains including Søre Svarthåmåren which is about 1.2 kilometres (0.75 mi) to the north, Grønliskarstinden which is about 5.5 kilometres (3.4 mi) to the northeast, Eggekollan which is about 3.4 kilometres (2.1 mi) to the east, Høgtunga which is about 8 kilometres (5.0 mi) to the southeast, and Sørhellhøe which is about 4.9 kilometres (3.0 mi) to the south. The lake Aursjøen lies about 5 kilometres (3.1 mi) to the west of the mountain.

== See also ==
- List of mountains of Norway
