= Snøhetta =

Mountain in Dovre, Norway

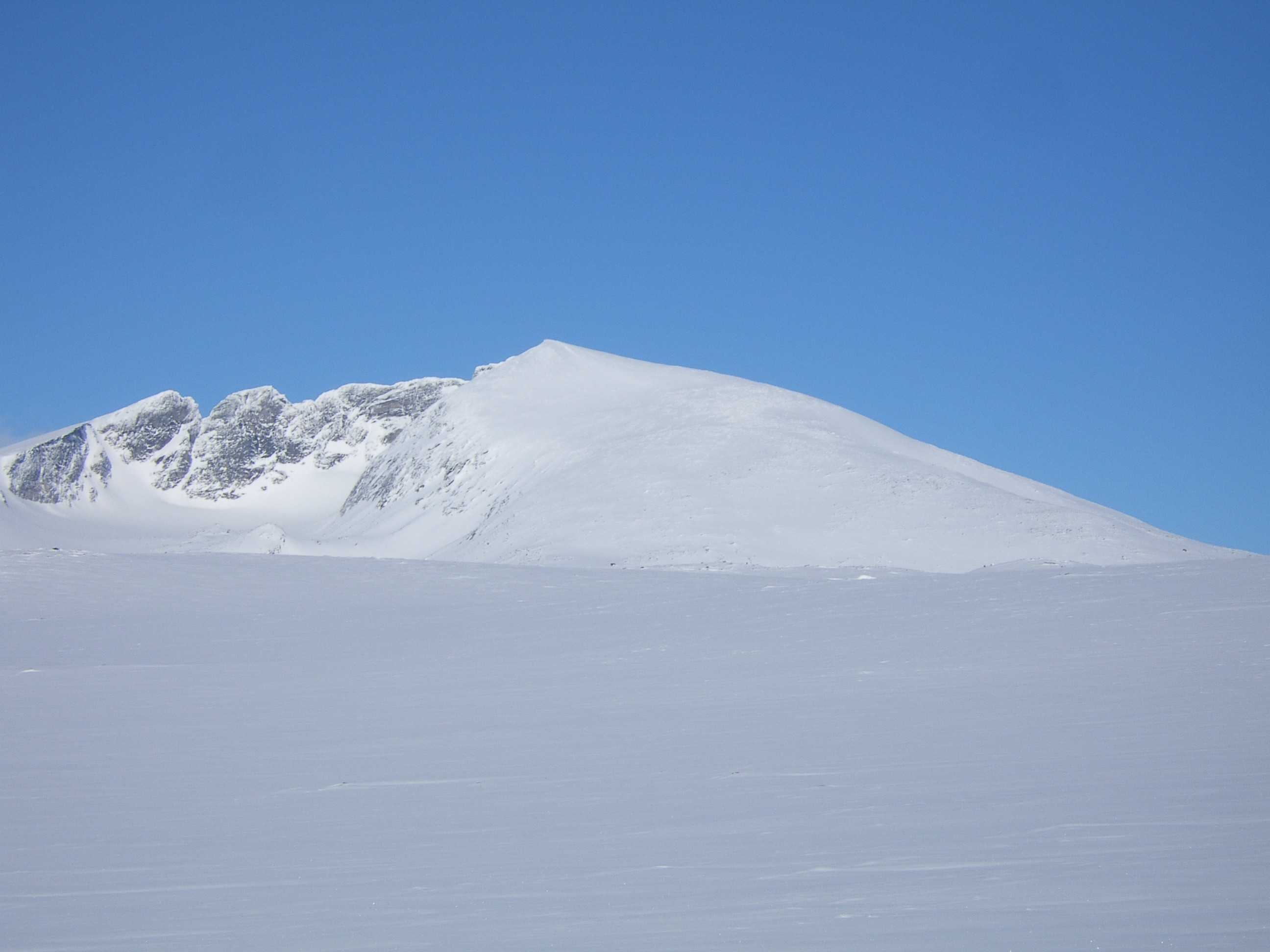
- Snøhetta. From the left, the peaks are Vesttoppen, Hettpiggen, Midttoppen and then Stortoppen (highest) to the right.

Highest point
- Elevation: 2,286 m (7,500 ft)
- Prominence: 1,675 m (5,495 ft)
- Isolation: 82.2 km (51.1 mi)
- Listing: Ultra #3 in Norway by prominence #24 in Norway by height
- Coordinates: 62°19′11″N 9°16′04″E

Geography
- Interactive map of the mountain
- Location: Innlandet, Norway
- Parent range: Dovrefjell
- Topo map: 1519 IV Snøhetta

Climbing
- First ascent: 1798 by Jens Esmark

Snøhetta is the highest mountain in the Dovrefjell mountain range in Norway. At 2,286 metres (7,500 ft), it is the highest mountain in Norway outside the Jotunheimen range, making it the 24th highest peak in Norway, based on a 30-metre (98 ft) topographic prominence cutoff. At 1,675 metres (5,495 ft), its topographic prominence is the third highest in Norway.

The mountain is located in the Dovrefjell mountains in northern Innlandet county in Dovre Municipality. The mountain lies inside Dovrefjell-Sunndalsfjella National Park and it is the highest peak in the park. It is surrounded by several other mountains including Brunkollen to the east; Einøvlingseggen to the south; Skredahøin Bruri, Nordre Svånåtinden, and Storstyggesvånåtinden to the southwest; and Store Langvasstinden, Larstinden, and Drugshøi to the west.

== Peaks ==
The mountain has several peaks:

- Stortoppen is the highest summit at 2,286 metres (7,500 ft).
- Midttoppen is the next highest summit reaching 2,278 metres (7,474 ft) with a topographic prominence of 40 metres (130 ft).
- Hettpiggen is the third highest peak on the mountain reaching 2,261 metres (7,418 ft) with a prominence of 50 metres (160 ft).
- Vesttoppen is the fourth highest peak at an elevation of 2,253 metres (7,392 ft) and a prominence of 70 metres (230 ft).

Vesttoppen and Stortoppen are easily available by hiking or skiing, and traveling from Stortoppen, Midttoppen is easily accessible. Traversing Midttoppen, via Hettpiggen and to Vesttoppen requires climbing with a rope.

On Stortoppen there is a radio link station, originally installed by the Norwegian Army, and now serving primarily civilian purposes. The station and its emergency diesel generator, as well as a nearby helipad, detract somewhat from the aesthetics of the summit. For this reason, many recommend Vesttoppen as a better destination.

A small monument for the Norwegian philosopher, humourist, author and mountaineer Peter Wessel Zapffe is located near the summit of Vesttoppen.

Under good conditions in both summer and winter, the ascent is relatively easy. Common starting points are the DNT-cabins Reinheim, Snøheim, or Åmotdalshytta.

== History ==
Snøhetta was visited for the first time in 1798 as part of a scientific trip to the area. At that time it was assumed that was the highest summit in Norway, because the Jotunheimen area with its higher peaks was rather inaccessible and unresearched, while Snøhetta is visible from the traditional travel route Oslo-Trondheim across the Dovrefjell mountains. The expression "until the Dovre mountains fall" (Norwegian: "til Dovre faller") was used in the oath sworn during the Norwegian Constituent Assembly in 1814, when Norway formed an independent nation after being in a union with Denmark for hundreds of years.

== Etymology ==
The name is a compound of the Norwegian word snø which means "snow" and the finite form of hette which means "hood", thus the name is translated as "the mountain with a hood of snow".

== Media gallery ==
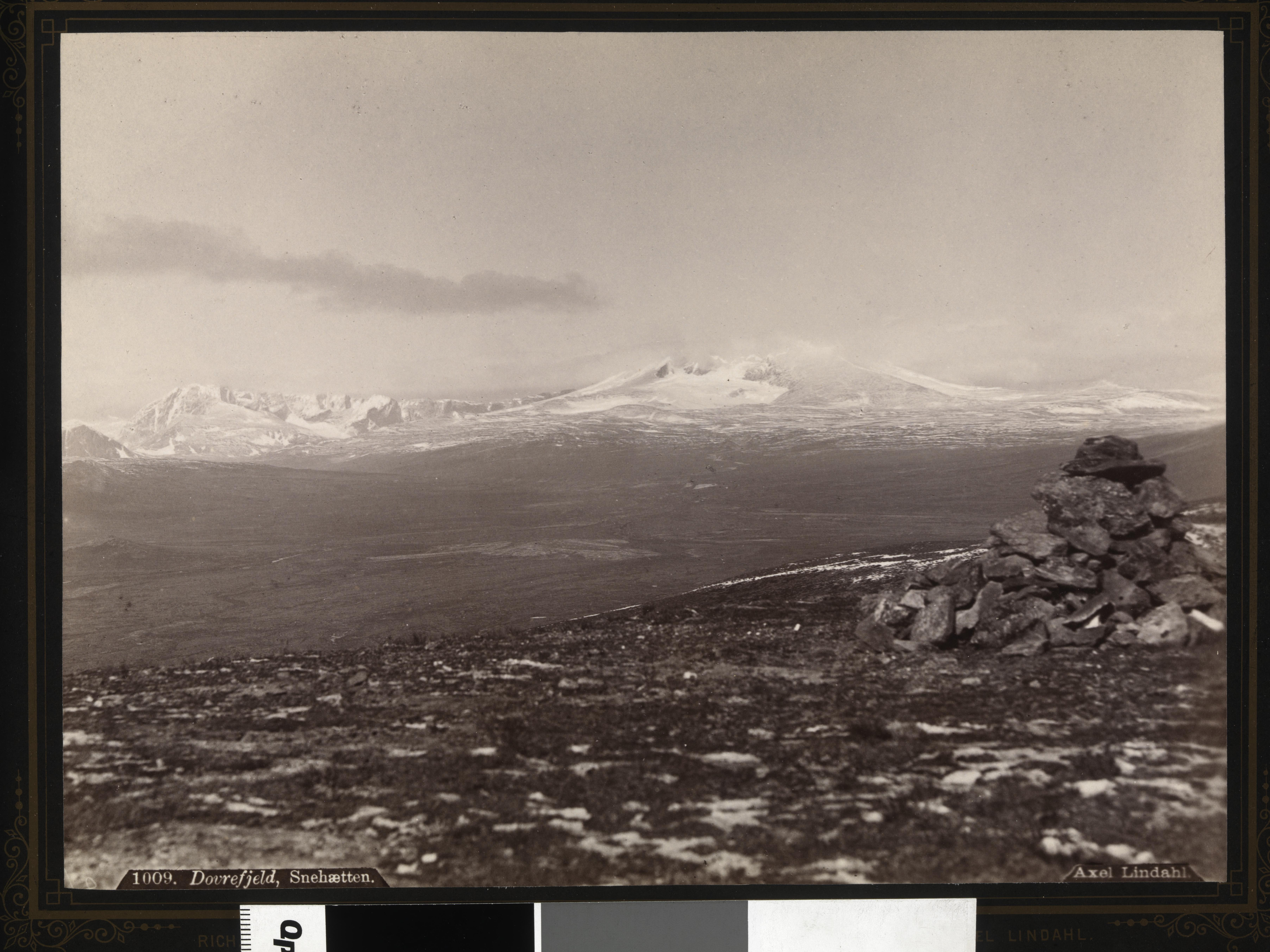
View from a distance

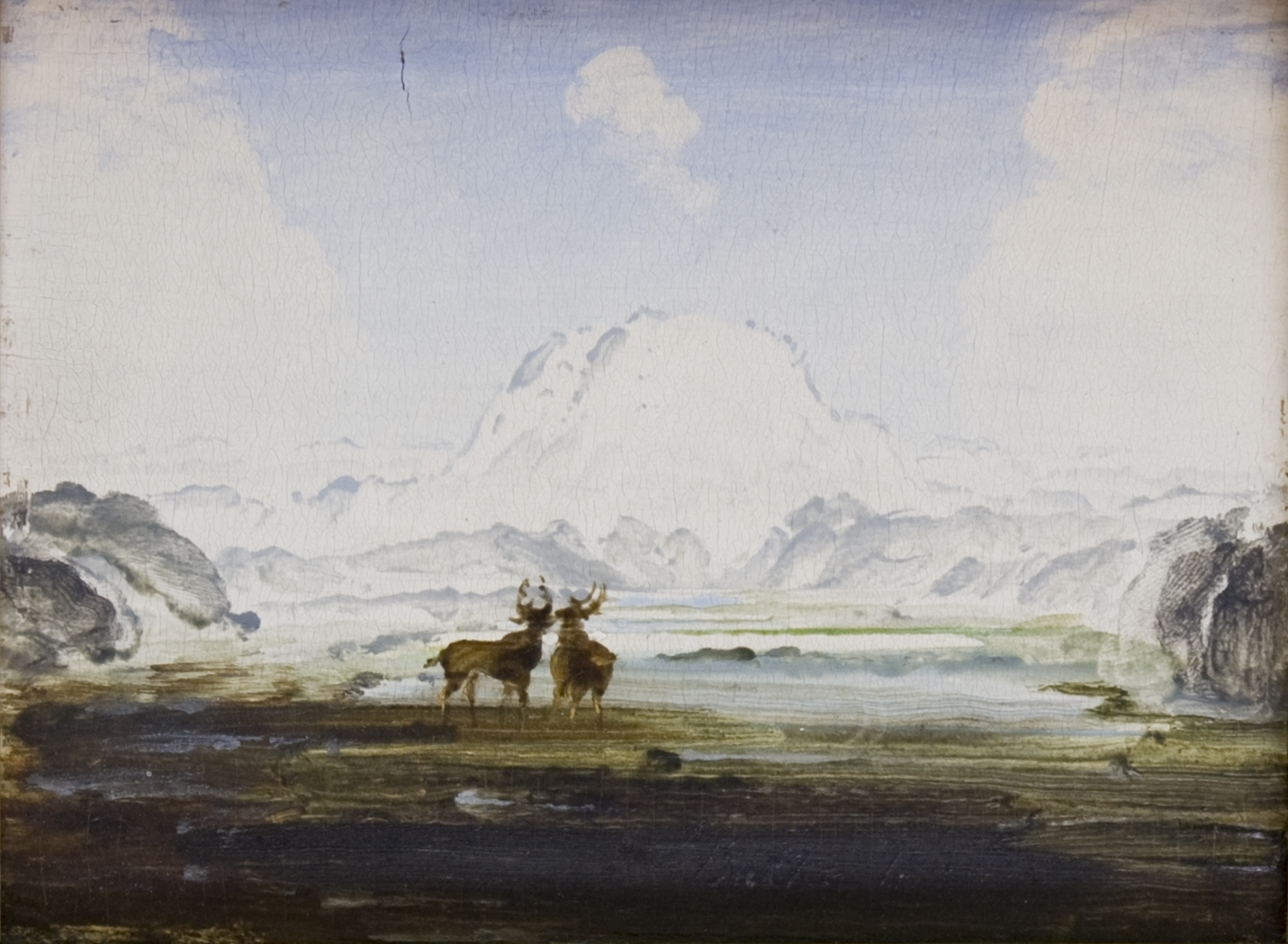
Painting of the mountain by Peder Balke

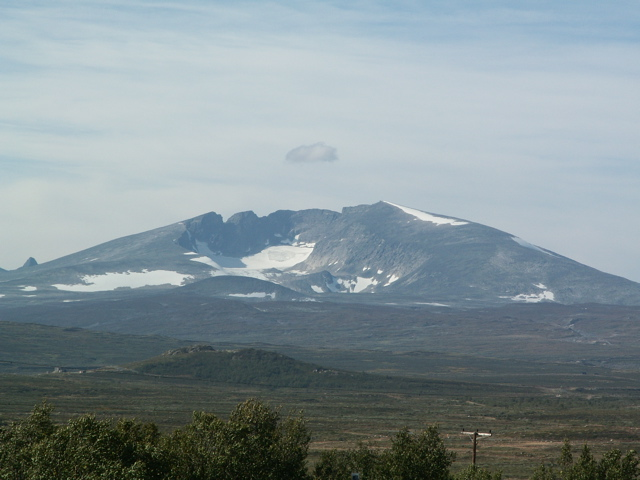
View of the east side from the E6 highway

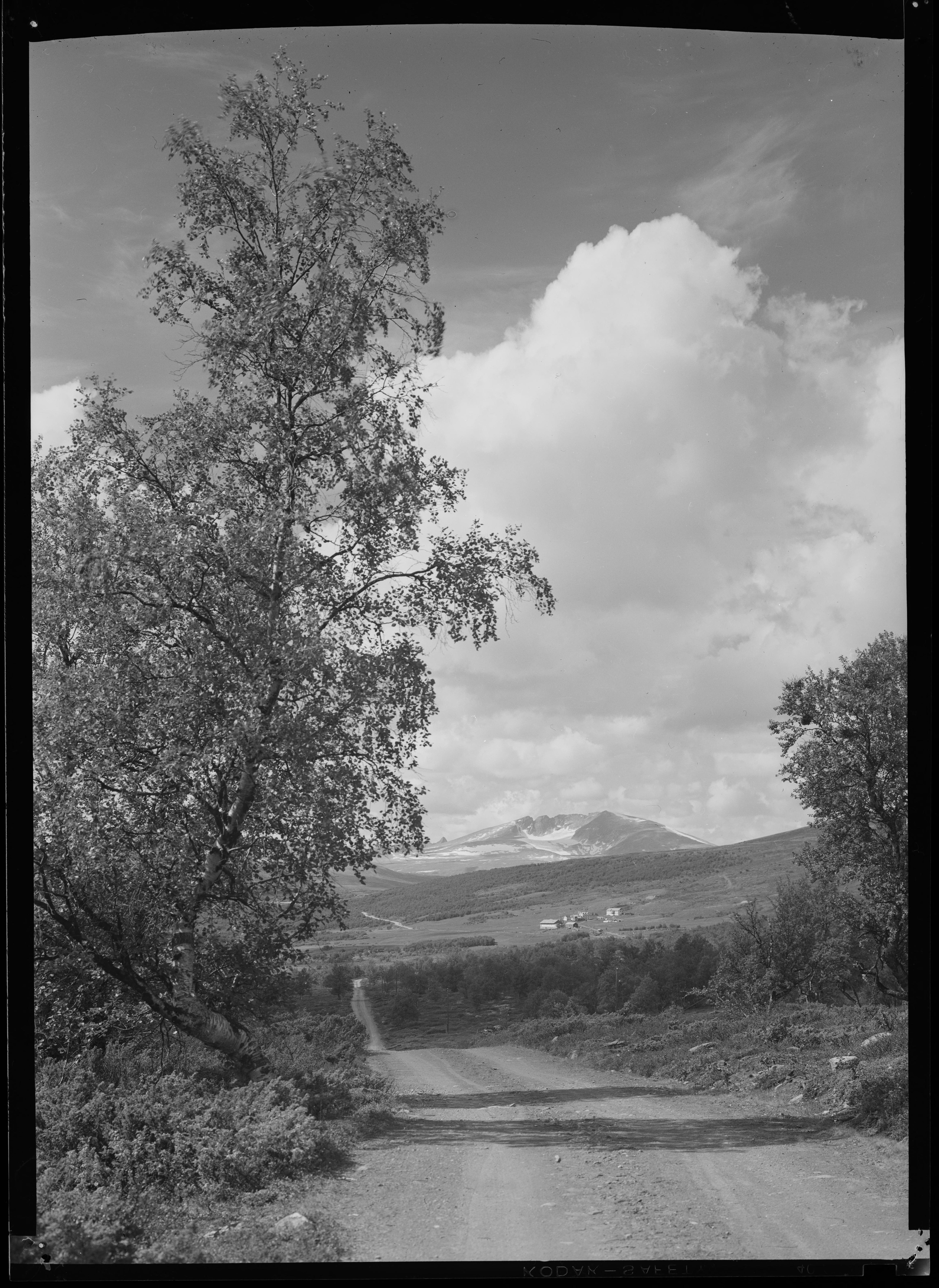
Snøhetta seen from Hjerkinn

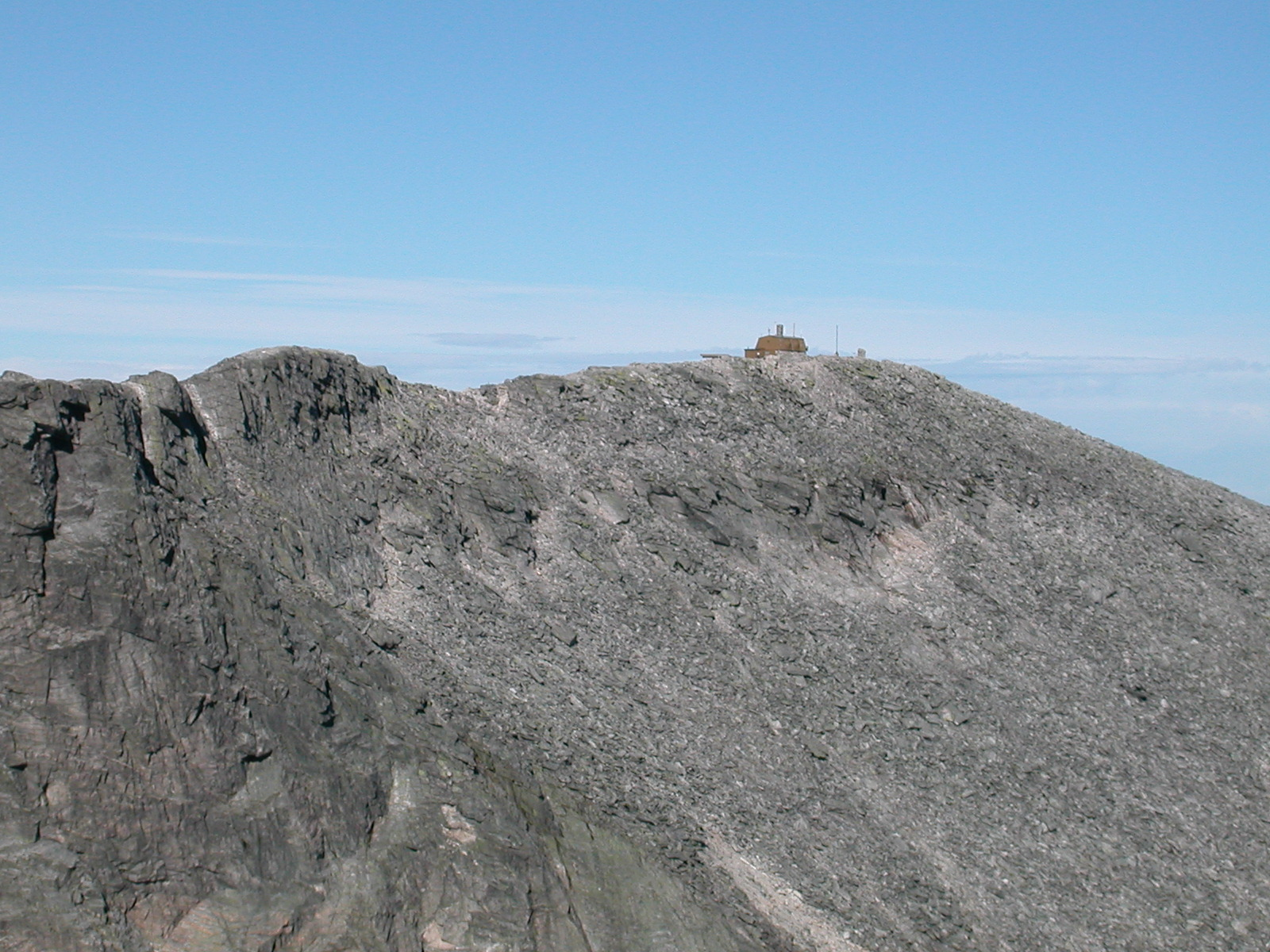
Stortoppen seen from Hettpiggen in summer

== Guidebook ==
- Dyer, Anthony; Baddeley, John; Robertson, Ian H. (2006). Walks and Scrambles in Norway. Rockbuy Limited. ISBN 9781904466253.
