= Tverrfjellet (Dovre) =

Mountain in Dovre, Norway

- Interactive map of the mountain

Highest point
- Elevation: 1,248 m (4,094 ft)
- Prominence: 75 m (246 ft)
- Isolation: 0.9 km (0.56 mi)
- Coordinates: 62°13′34″N 9°29′32″E

Geography
- Location: Innlandet, Norway
- Parent range: Dovrefjell

Tverrfjellet is a mountain in Dovre Municipality in Innlandet county, Norway. The 1,248-metre (4,094 ft) tall mountain is located in the Dovrefjell mountains and just outside the borders of the Dovrefjell-Sunndalsfjella National Park and about 2 kilometres (1.2 mi) sest of the village of Hjerkinn. The mountain is surrounded by several other notable mountains including Einøvlingseggen to the west and Snøhetta and Brunkollen to the northwest.

== See also ==
- List of mountains of Norway
