= Søre Svarthåmåren =

Mountain in Lesja, Norway

- Søndre Svarthåmåren (historic)
- Interactive map of the mountain

Highest point
- Elevation: 1,756 m (5,761 ft)
- Prominence: 29 m (95 ft)
- Isolation: 1.5 km (0.93 mi)
- Coordinates: 62°22′15″N 8°47′21″E

Geography
- Location: Innlandet, Norway
- Parent range: Dovrefjell

Søre Svarthåmåren is a mountain in Lesja Municipality in Innlandet county, Norway. The 1,756-metre (5,761 ft) tall mountain is located within the Dovrefjell-Sunndalsfjella National Park, about 25 kilometres (16 mi) northeast of the village of Lesjaverk and about 36 kilometres (22 mi) south of Sunndalsøra. The mountain is surrounded by other mountains including Geitåhøe which is about 1.5 kilometres (0.93 mi) to the south, Eggekollan which is about 4 kilometres (2.5 mi) to the southeast, and Grønliskarstinden which is about 4.9 kilometres (3.0 mi) to the northeast. The lake Aursjøen lies about 6 kilometres (3.7 mi) to the west of the mountain.

== See also ==
- List of mountains of Norway
