= Store Langvasstinden =

Mountain in Lesja, Norway

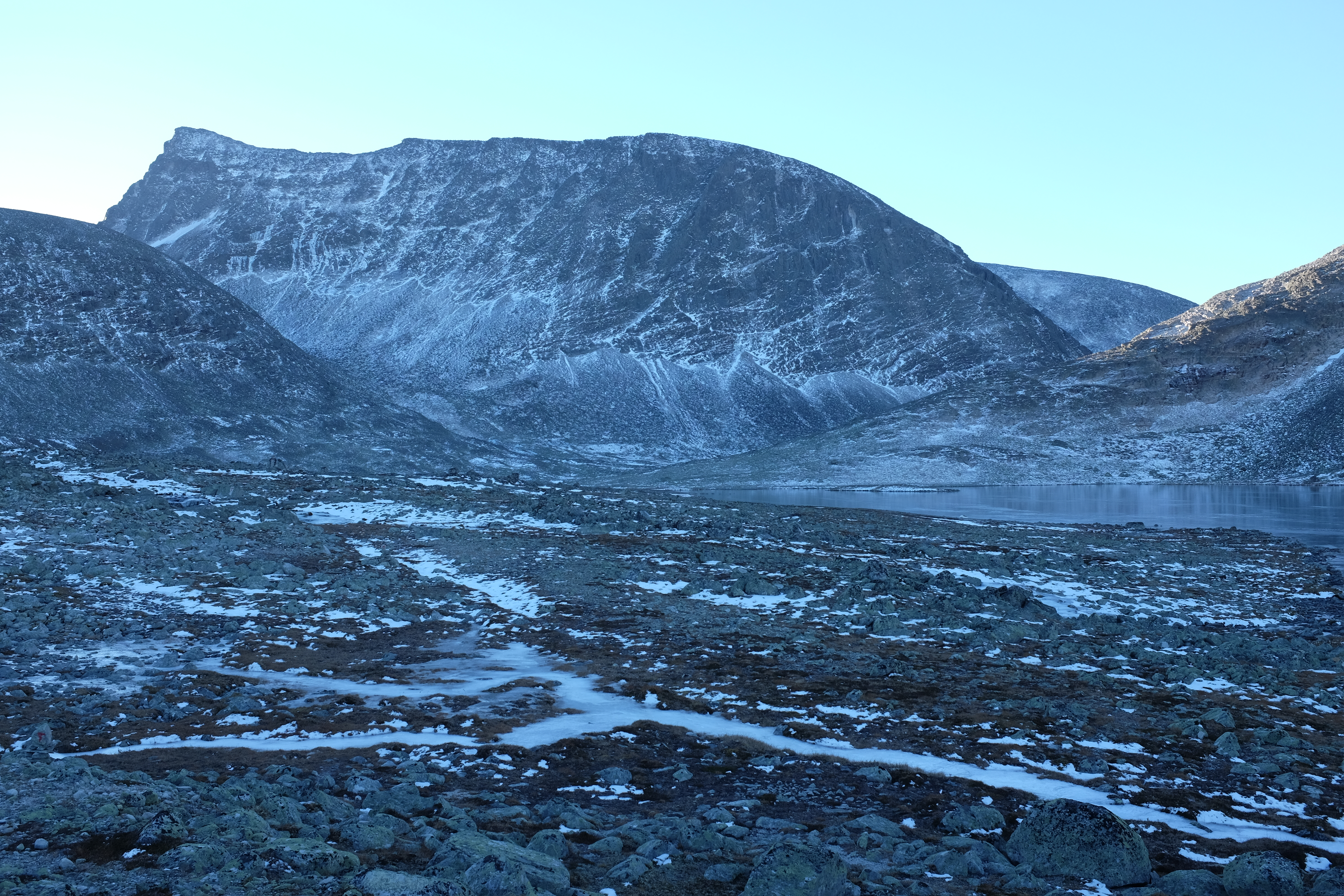
- Store Langvasstinden summit at Dovrefjell-Sunndalsfjella National Park, Norway

Highest point
- Elevation: 2,085 m (6,841 ft)
- Prominence: 168 m (551 ft)
- Parent peak: Storstyggesvånåtinden
- Isolation: 1 km (0.62 mi) to Larstinden
- Coordinates: 62°18′59″N 9°12′09″E

Geography
- Interactive map of the mountain
- Location: Innlandet, Norway
- Parent range: Dovrefjell

Store Langvasstinden is a mountain in Lesja Municipality in Innlandet county, Norway. The 2,085-metre (6,841 ft) tall mountain lies within Dovrefjell-Sunndalsfjella National Park, about 25 kilometres (16 mi) north of the village of Dombås. The mountain is located in the Svånåtindene mountains and it is surrounded by several other mountains including Drugshøe which is about 3 kilometres (1.9 mi) to the northwest, Nørdre Svånåtinden which is about 2 kilometres (1.2 mi) to the southwest, Storstyggesvånåtinden which is 3.5 kilometres (2.2 mi) to the south, Larstinden which is about 1.1 kilometres (0.68 mi) to the east, and Snøhetta which is about 3 kilometres (1.9 mi) to the east.

== See also ==
- List of mountains of Norway
