= Tverrfjellet =

Tverrfjellet may refer to:

- Tverrfjellet (Skjåk), a mountain in Skjåk municipality in Innlandet county, Norway
- Tverrfjellet (Sula), a mountain in Sula municipality in Møre og Romsdal county, Norway
- Tverrfjellet (Dovre), a mountain in Dovre municipality in Innlandet county, Norway
- Tverrfjellet (Vang), a mountain in Vang municipality in Innlandet county, Norway
