= Mjogsjøhøe =

Mountain in Lesja, Norway

- Mjogsjøhøi / Mjogsjøhøa
- Interactive map of the mountain

Highest point
- Elevation: 1,837 m (6,027 ft)
- Prominence: 396 m (1,299 ft)
- Isolation: 3.3 km (2.1 mi)
- Coordinates: 62°14′51″N 9°04′23″E

Geography
- Location: Innlandet, Norway
- Parent range: Dovrefjell

Mjogsjøhøe is a mountain in Lesja Municipality in Innlandet county, Norway. The 1,837-metre (6,027 ft) tall mountain lies within Dovrefjell-Sunndalsfjella National Park, about 18 kilometres (11 mi) northeast of the village of Lesja. The mountain is surrounded by several other mountains including Drugshøe which is about 7 kilometres (4.3 mi) to the north, Storstyggesvånåtinden which is about 8 kilometres (5.0 mi) to the north-northeast, Skredahøin which is about 5 kilometres (3.1 mi) to the east, Mjogsjøvike which is 4 kilometres (2.5 mi) to the south, Hatten which is about 6 kilometres (3.7 mi) to the southwest, Sjongshøi which is about 9 kilometres (5.6 mi) to the west, and Vesltverråtinden and Stortverråtinden which are about 8 kilometres (5.0 mi) to the northwest.

== See also ==
- List of mountains of Norway
