= Høgtunga (Lesja) =

Mountain in Lesja, Norway

- Interactive map of the mountain

Highest point
- Elevation: 1,838 m (6,030 ft)
- Prominence: 123 m (404 ft)
- Parent peak: Stortverråtinden
- Isolation: 2.6 km (1.6 mi)
- Coordinates: 62°18′10″N 8°53′20″E

Geography
- Location: Innlandet, Norway
- Parent range: Dovrefjell

Høgtunga is a mountain in Lesja Municipality in Innlandet county, Norway. The 1,838-metre (6,030 ft) tall mountain lies within the Dovrefjell-Sunndalsfjella National Park, about 20 kilometres (12 mi) north of the village of Lesja. The mountain lies in the Dovrefjell mountains. It is surrounded by a number of other notable mountains, including Lågvasstinden which is about 4 kilometres (2.5 mi) to the east, Vesltverråtinden and Stortverråtinden which are about 3 kilometres (1.9 mi) to the southeast, Sjongshøi which is about 5.6 kilometres (3.5 mi) to the south, Sørhellhøin which is about 5 kilometres (3.1 mi) to the southwest, Sørhellhøi which is about 5 kilometres (3.1 mi) to the west, Eggekollan which is about 5.7 kilometres (3.5 mi) to the north, and Salhøa which is about 9 kilometres (5.6 mi) to the northeast.

== See also ==
- List of mountains of Norway
