= Hatten (Lesja) =

Mountain in Lesja, Norway

- Interactive map of the mountain

Highest point
- Elevation: 1,732 m (5,682 ft)
- Prominence: 492 m (1,614 ft)
- Isolation: 1 km (0.62 mi)
- Coordinates: 62°13′08″N 9°00′51″E

Geography
- Location: Innlandet, Norway
- Parent range: Dovrefjell

Hatten is a mountain in Lesja Municipality in Innlandet county, Norway. The 1,732-metre (5,682 ft) tall mountain lies within Dovrefjell-Sunndalsfjella National Park, about 14 kilometres (8.7 mi) northeast of the village of Lesja. The mountain is surrounded by several other mountains including Sjongshøi which is about 6.5 kilometres (4.0 mi) to the northwest, Stortverråtinden which is about 8.5 kilometres (5.3 mi) to the north-northwest, Mjogsjøhøe which is 6 kilometres (3.7 mi) to the northeast, and Skredahøin which is about 10 kilometres (6.2 mi) to the east.

== See also ==
- List of mountains of Norway
