= Mjogsjøoksli =

Mountain in Lesja, Norway

Mjogsjøvike Mjogsjøoksli
- Interactive map of the mountain

Highest point
- Elevation: 1,667 m (5,469 ft)
- Prominence: 88 m (289 ft)
- Isolation: 4.8 km (3.0 mi)
- Coordinates: 62°13′16″N 9°07′25″E

Geography
- Location: Innlandet, Norway
- Parent range: Dovrefjell

Mjogsjøoksli or Mjogsjøvike is a mountain in Lesja Municipality in Innlandet county, Norway. The 1,667-metre (5,469 ft) tall mountain lies within Dovrefjell-Sunndalsfjella National Park, about 18 kilometres (11 mi) northeast of the village of Lesja. The mountain is surrounded by several other mountains including Skredahøin which is about 4.5 kilometres (2.8 mi) to the northeast, Storstyggesvånåtinden which is about 8 kilometres (5.0 mi) to the north-northeast, Mjogsjøhøe which is 4 kilometres (2.5 mi) to the north, and Hatten which is about 6 kilometres (3.7 mi) to the west.

== See also ==
- List of mountains of Norway
