= Eggekollan =

Mountain in Lesja, Norway

- Interactive map of the mountain

Highest point
- Elevation: 1,809 m (5,935 ft)
- Prominence: 88 m (289 ft)
- Parent peak: Geitåhøe
- Isolation: 3.1 km (1.9 mi)
- Coordinates: 62°21′10″N 8°51′25″E

Geography
- Location: Innlandet, Norway
- Parent range: Dovrefjell

Eggekollan is a mountain in Lesja Municipality in Innlandet county, Norway. The 1,809-metre (5,935 ft) tall mountain lies inside the Dovrefjell-Sunndalsfjella National Park, about 25 kilometres (16 mi) northeast of the village of Lesjaverk. The mountain lies about 3 kilometres (1.9 mi) to the southwest of Grønliskarstinden, about 6 kilometres (3.7 mi) west of Grøvudalstinden, about 5.5 kilometres (3.4 mi) northwest of Høgtunga, about 5.5 kilometres (3.4 mi) northeast of Sørhellhøe, and about 3 kilometres (1.9 mi) east of Geitåhøe.

== See also ==
- List of mountains of Norway
