= Innlandet County Municipality =

Innlandet County Municipality Innlandet fylkeskommune
- County
- Coat of arms

- Location in Norway
- Coordinates: 61.22°N 10.81°E
- Country: Norway
- Administrative center: Hamar

Government
  - County mayor: Thomas Breen
- ISO 3166 code: NO-34
- Employees: 6,000
- Schools: 23
- Roads: 6,872 km (4,270 mi)
- Website: innlandetfylke.no

Innlandet County Municipality (Norwegian: Innlandet fylkeskommune) is the democratically elected regional governing administration of Innlandet county in Norway. The main responsibilities of the county municipality includes the overseeing the county's 23 upper secondary schools with over 12,000 students. They also oversee 6,800 kilometres (4,200 mi) of county roadways and public transport including over 600 busses. The county has 39 dental clinics. The county is also in charge of promoting local culture and cultural heritage.

== County government ==
The county municipality's most important tasks include secondary education, recreation (sports and outdoor life), and cultural heritage. The county municipality is also responsible for all county roads (including ferry operations) and public transport (including school busses). The county municipality has further responsibility for regional land-use planning, business development, power production, and environmental management. The county also has responsibility for providing dental health services (in 2002, responsibility for hospitals and public medicine was transferred from the counties to the new regional health authorities).

=== County mayor ===
The county mayor (Norwegian: fylkesordfører) of Innlandet has been the political leader of the county and the chairperson of the county council. Here is a list of people who have held this position:

- 2020–2023: Even Aleksander Hagen (Ap)
- 2023–present: Thomas Breen (Ap)

=== County council ===
The county council (Norwegian: Fylkestinget) is made up of 57 representatives that are elected by direct election by all legal residents of the county every fourth year. The council is the legislative body for the county. The county council typically meets about six times a year. Council members are divided into standing committees and an executive committee (fylkesutvalg), which meet considerably more often. Both the council and executive committee (with at least 5 members) are led by the county mayor (Norwegian: fylkesordfører). The executive committee carries out the executive functions of the county under the direction of the whole council. The tables below show the current and historical composition of the council by political party.

Innlandet fylkesting 2023–2027
Party name (in Norwegian)	Number of representatives
Labour Party (Arbeiderpartiet)	18
Progress Party (Fremskrittspartiet)	5
Green Party (Miljøpartiet De Grønne)	2
Conservative Party (Høyre)	10
Industry and Business Party (Industri‑ og Næringspartiet)	2
Christian Democratic Party (Kristelig Folkeparti)	1
Pensioners' Party (Pensjonistpartiet)	2
Red Party (Rødt)	2
Centre Party (Senterpartiet)	10
Socialist Left Party (Sosialistisk Venstreparti)	3
Liberal Party (Venstre)	2
Total number of members:	57

Innlandet fylkesting 2020–2023
Party name (in Norwegian)	Number of representatives
Labour Party (Arbeiderpartiet)	20
Progress Party (Fremskrittspartiet)	3
Green Party (Miljøpartiet De Grønne)	3
Conservative Party (Høyre)	7
Christian Democratic Party (Kristelig Folkeparti)	1
Pensioners' Party (Pensjonistpartiet)	1
Red Party (Rødt)	2
Centre Party (Senterpartiet)	16
Socialist Left Party (Sosialistisk Venstreparti)	3
Liberal Party (Venstre)	1
Total number of members:	57
