= Salhøa =

Mountain in Lesja, Norway

- Salhøi
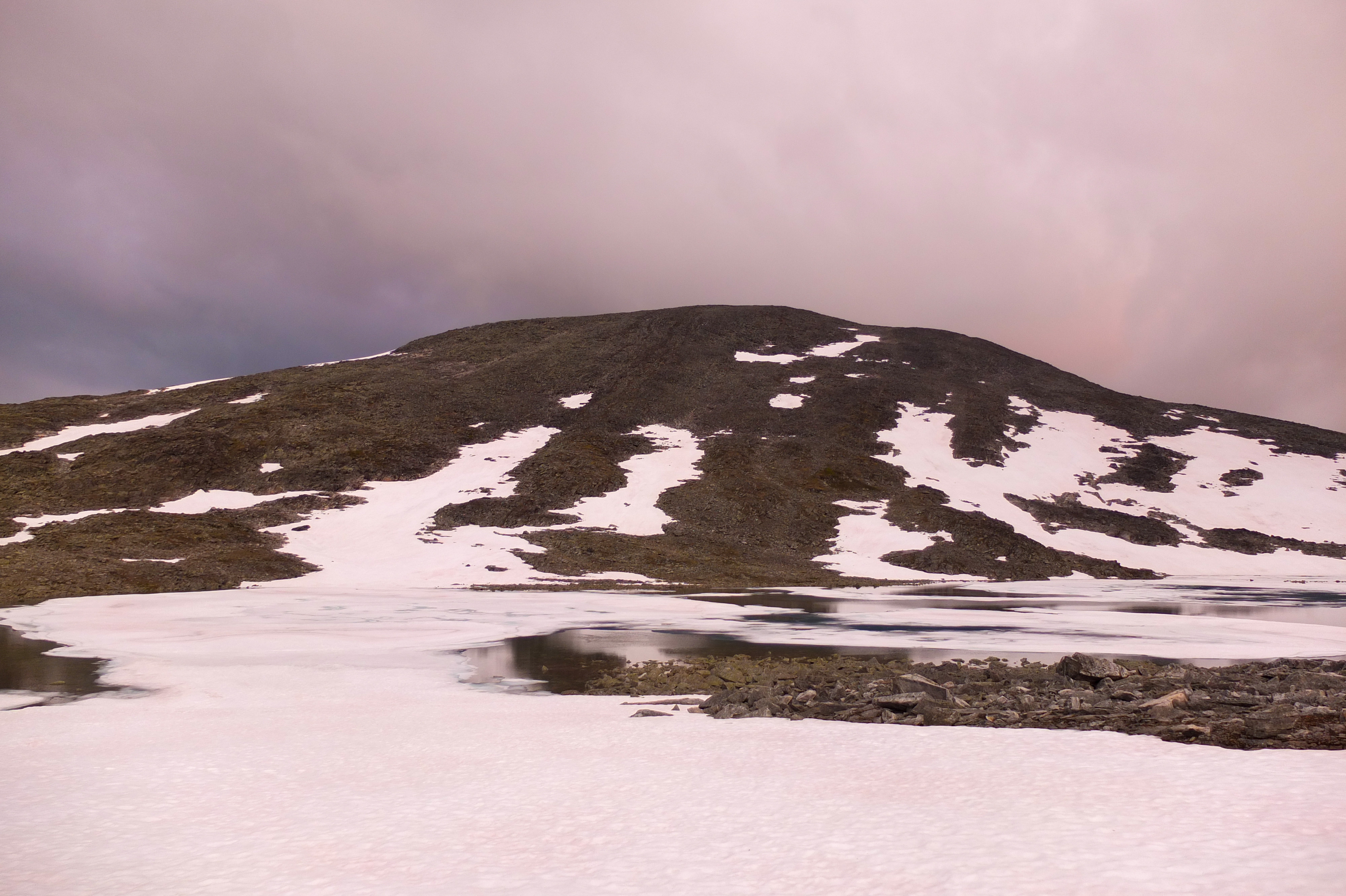
- Salhøa in the evening, viewed from the north. The small lake in the front is at an elevation of 1589 m above sea level.

Highest point
- Elevation: 1,853 m (6,079 ft)
- Prominence: 205 m (673 ft)
- Parent peak: Storskrymten
- Isolation: 2 km (1.2 mi)
- Coordinates: 62°21′34″N 9°01′08″E

Geography
- Interactive map of the mountain
- Location: Innlandet and Møre og Romsdal, Norway
- Parent range: Dovrefjell

Salhøa is a mountain in Dovrefjell–Sunndalsfjella National Park in Norway. The 1,853-metre (6,079 ft) tall mountain is located on the border between Sunndal Municipality in Møre og Romsdal county and Lesja Municipality in Innlandet county. Salhøa is reached most easily by hiking from Grøvudalen in the north. There are three large surrounding mountains, all within 3 kilometres (1.9 mi), including the 1,844-metre (6,050 ft) tall Grøvudalstinden to the west, the 1,881-metre (6,171 ft) tall Steinkollen to the north, and the 1,985-metre (6,512 ft) tall Storskrymten to the northwest. Other nearby mountains include Skuleggen to the east, Drugshøi to the southeast, and Lågvasstinden to the southwest.

== See also ==
- List of mountains of Norway
