= Drugshøe =

Mountain in Lesja, Norway

- Drugshøi / Drugshøie
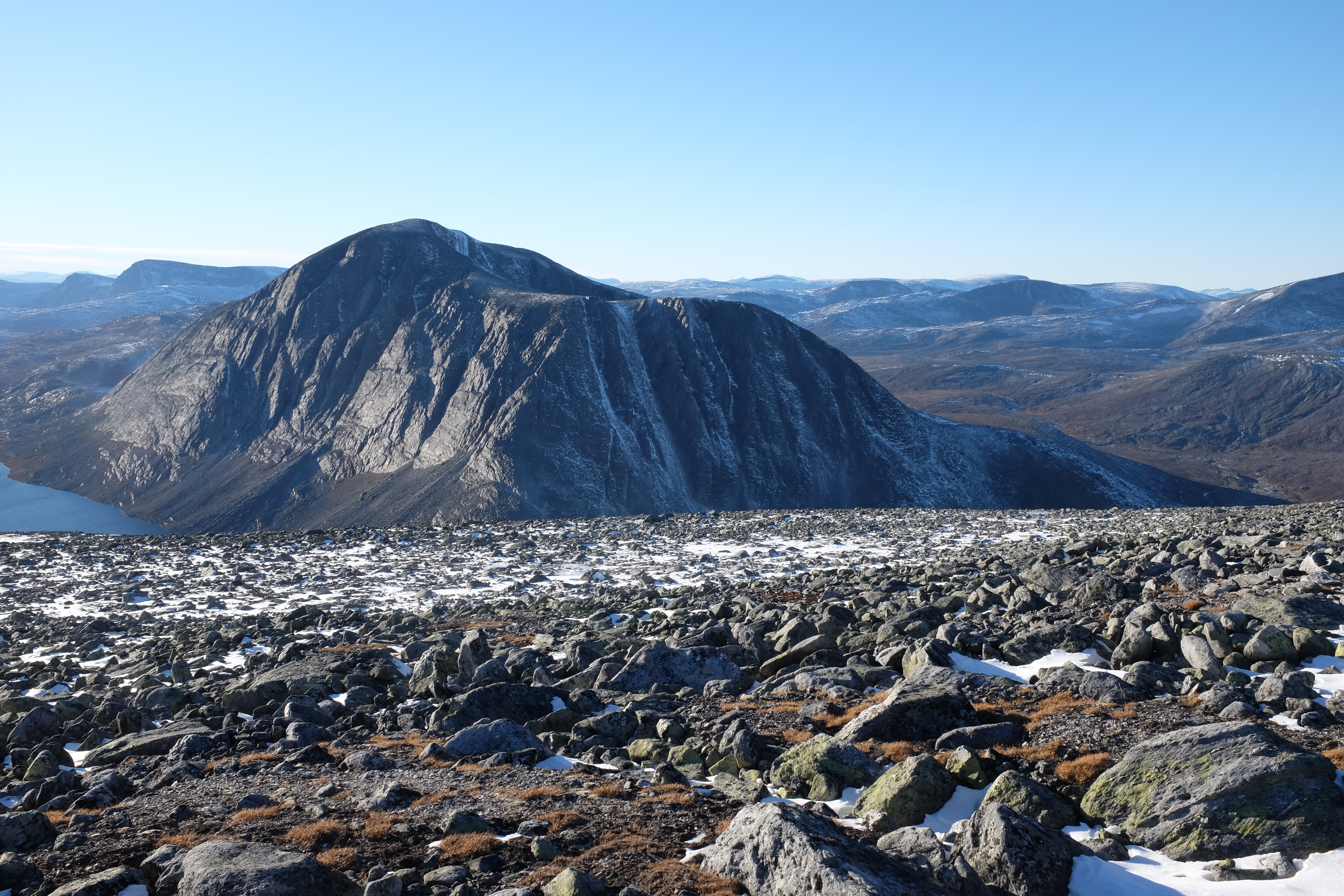

Highest point
- Elevation: 1,748 m (5,735 ft)
- Prominence: 14 m (46 ft)
- Parent peak: Drugshøeggen
- Isolation: 0.778 km (0.483 mi) to Store Langvasstinden
- Coordinates: 62°19′19″N 9°06′44″E

Geography
- Interactive map of the mountain
- Location: Innlandet, Norway
- Parent range: Dovrefjell

Drugshøe is a mountain in Lesja Municipality in Innlandet county, Norway. The 1,748-metre (5,735 ft) tall mountain lies within the Dovrefjell-Sunndalsfjella National Park, about 30 kilometres (19 mi) north of Dombås and about 26 kilometres (16 mi) northeast of the village of Lesja. The mountains Larstinden and Store Langvasstinden lie about 4.5 kilometres (2.8 mi) to the east, the mountain Storstyggesvånåtinden lies about 5 kilometres (3.1 mi) to the southeast, the mountain Mjogsjøhøe lies about 7 kilometres (4.3 mi) to the south, and the mountains Storskrymten and Salhøa lie about 5.5 kilometres (3.4 mi) to the northwest.

== See also ==
- List of mountains of Norway
