= Svartdalskollen =

Mountain in Trøndelag, Norway

- Interactive map of the mountain

Highest point
- Elevation: 1,777 m (5,830 ft)
- Prominence: 80 m (260 ft)
- Parent peak: Skirådalskollen
- Isolation: 2.8 km (1.7 mi)
- Coordinates: 62°28′09″N 9°16′32″E

Geography
- Location: Trøndelag, Norway
- Parent range: Dovrefjell

Svartdalskollen is a mountain in Oppdal Municipality in Trøndelag county in central Norway. The 1,777-metre (5,830 ft) tall mountain is located about 20 kilometres (12 mi) southwest of the village of Driva and about 13 kilometres (8.1 mi) south of the village of Lønset.

== See also ==
- List of mountains of Norway by height
