= Skredahøin =

Mountain in Lesja, Norway

- Interactive map of the mountain

Highest point
- Elevation: 2,004 m (6,575 ft)
- Prominence: 384 m (1,260 ft)
- Isolation: 2.5 km (1.6 mi) to Storstyggesvånåtinden
- Coordinates: 62°14′16″N 9°11′19″E

Geography
- Location: Innlandet, Norway
- Parent range: Dovrefjell

Skredahøin (also referred to as Skredho and Skredhøis) is a mountain in Lesja Municipality in Innlandet county, Norway. The 2,004-metre (6,575 ft) tall mountain lies within Dovrefjell-Sunndalsfjella National Park, about 20 kilometres (12 mi) north of the village of Dombås. The mountain is surrounded by several other mountains including Storstyggesvånåtinden which is about 3 kilometres (1.9 mi) to the north, Snøhetta which is about 7.5 kilometres (4.7 mi) to the northeast, Einøvlingseggen which is about 6 kilometres (3.7 mi) to the southeast, Mjogsjøoksli which is about 5.5 kilometres (3.4 mi) to the southwest, and Mjogsjøhøe which is about 5 kilometres (3.1 mi) to the west.

Skredahøin lies in an active seismic region and hence experiences frequent earthquakes, including one on 24 March 2012 with a magnitude of 3.2 on the Ritcher Scale and its centre was 305.3 kilometres (189.7 mi) away for the mountain.

== See also ==
- List of mountains of Norway
