= Svånåtindan =

Mountain range in Norway

- Svånåtindene
- Interactive map of the mountain

Highest point
- Peak: Storstyggesvånåtinden, Lesja Municipality, Norway
- Elevation: 2,212 m (7,257 ft)
- Prominence: 538 m (1,765 ft)
- Isolation: 4.5 km (2.8 mi)
- Coordinates: 62.2841539°N 9.18832540°E

Geography
- Location: Innlandet, Norway
- Range coordinates: 62.29421°N 9.17865°E
- Parent range: Dovrefjell

Svånåtindan is a small mountain range in Lesja Municipality in Innlandet county, Norway. The mountains are part of the larger Dovrefjell mountains inside the borders of the Dovrefjell-Sunndalsfjella National Park. These mountains are part of the same massif which contains several notable peaks including the 2,212-metre (7,257 ft) tall Storstyggesvånåtinden, the 2,004-metre (6,575 ft) tall Nordre Svånåtinden, and the 2,001-metre (6,565 ft) tall mountain Bruri. The area is located about 20 kilometres (12 mi) north of the village of Dombås.

== See also ==
- List of mountains of Norway
