= Storstyggesvånåtinden =

Mountain in Lesja, Norway

Storstyggesvånåtinden Storsvånåtinden
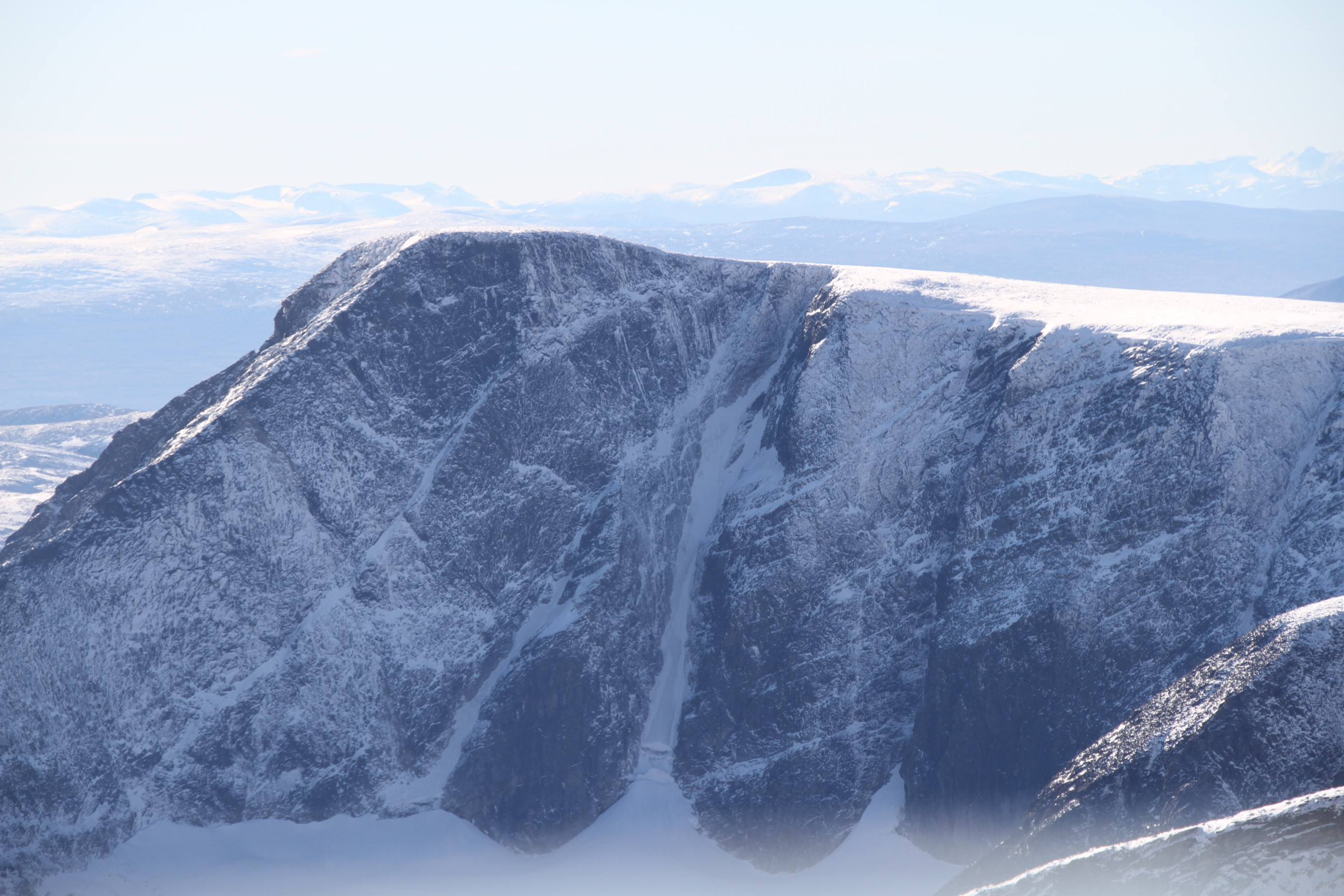
- View of the mountain

Highest point
- Elevation: 2,212 m (7,257 ft)
- Prominence: 538 m (1,765 ft)
- Isolation: 4.5 km (2.8 mi)
- Coordinates: 62°17′02″N 9°11′18″E

Geography
- Interactive map of the mountain
- Location: Innlandet, Norway
- Parent range: Svånåtindene

Storstyggesvånåtinden or Storsvånåtinden is a mountain in Lesja Municipality in Innlandet county, Norway. The 2,212-metre (7,257 ft) tall mountain lies within Dovrefjell-Sunndalsfjella National Park, about 20 kilometres (12 mi) north of the village of Dombås in the Svånåtindan mountains. The mountain is surrounded by several other mountains including Nørdre Svånåtinden which is about 3 kilometres (1.9 mi) to the north, Snøhetta which is about 5 kilometres (3.1 mi) to the northeast, Skredahøin which is 3 kilometres (1.9 mi) to the south, and Mjogsjøhøe and Mjogsjøoksli which are about 7 kilometres (4.3 mi) to the southwest.

== See also ==
- List of mountains of Norway
