= Lesja (village) =

Village in Lesja Municipality, Norway

- Village
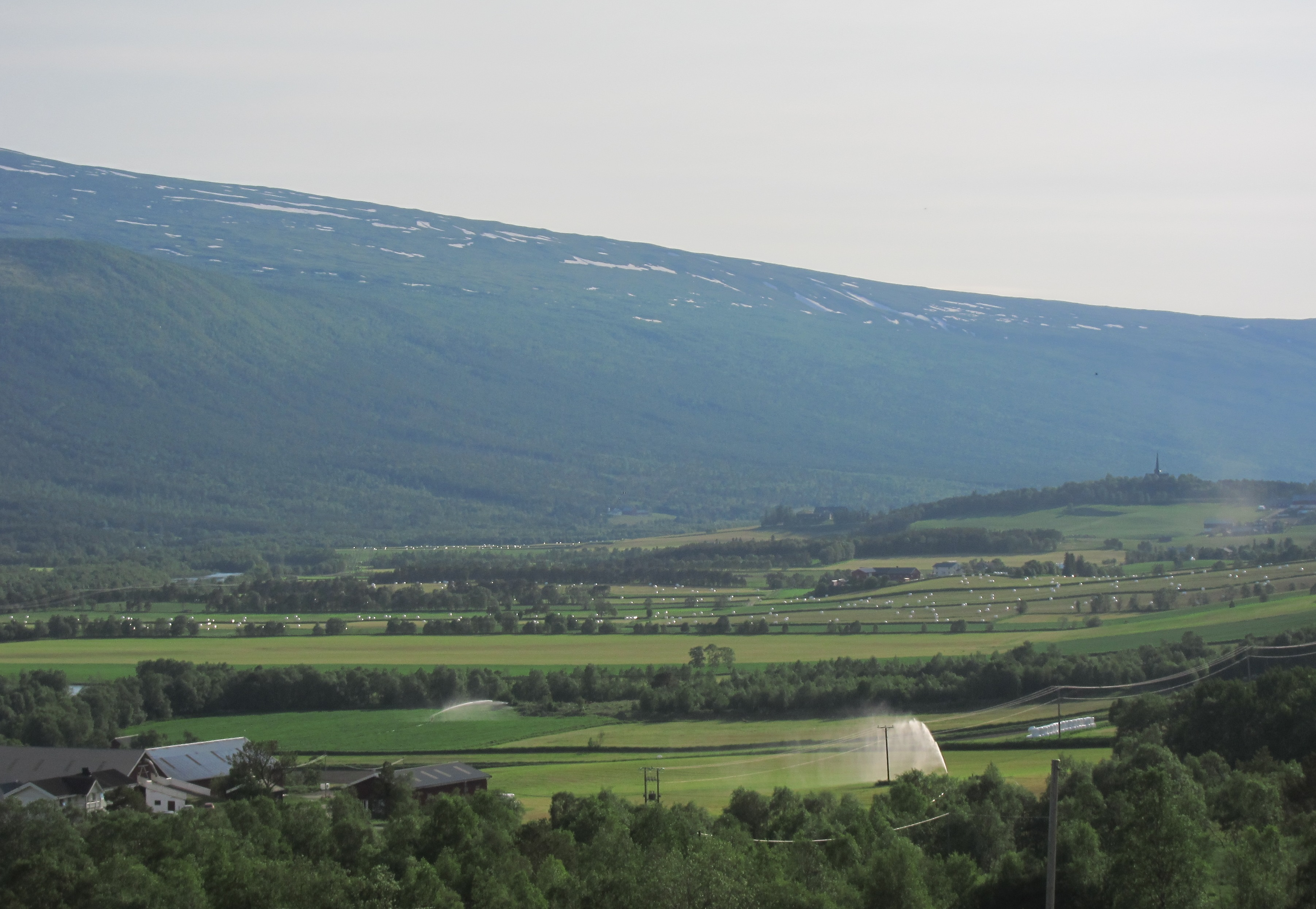
- View of the farmland surrounding the village.
- Interactive map of Lesja
- Location within Innlandet Location within Norway
- Coordinates: 62.11837°N 8.86424°E
- Country: Norway
- Region: Eastern Norway
- County: Innlandet
- District: Gudbrandsdalen
- Municipality: Lesja Municipality

Area
  - Total: 0.41 km^{2} (0.16 sq mi)
- Elevation: 626 m (2,054 ft)

Population (2024)
  - Total: 230
  - Density: 561/km^{2} (1,450/sq mi)
- Time zone: UTC+01:00 (CET)
  - Summer (DST): UTC+02:00 (CEST)
- Post Code: 2665 Lesja

Lesja is the administrative centre of Lesja Municipality in Innlandet county, Norway. The village is located in the upper Gudbrandsdalen valley, along the river Gudbrandsdalslågen, about 16 kilometres (9.9 mi) northwest of the larger village of Dombås. The European route E136 highway and the Raumabanen railway line both pass through the village, with the railway line stopping at the Lesja Station. Lesja Church is located in the village.

The 0.41-square-kilometre (100-acre) village had a population (2024) of 230 and a population density of 561 inhabitants per square kilometre (1,450/sq mi). Since 2019, the population and area data for this village area has not been separately tracked by Statistics Norway.
