= Dovrefjell–Sunndalsfjella National Park =

National park in Norway

- IUCN category II (national park)

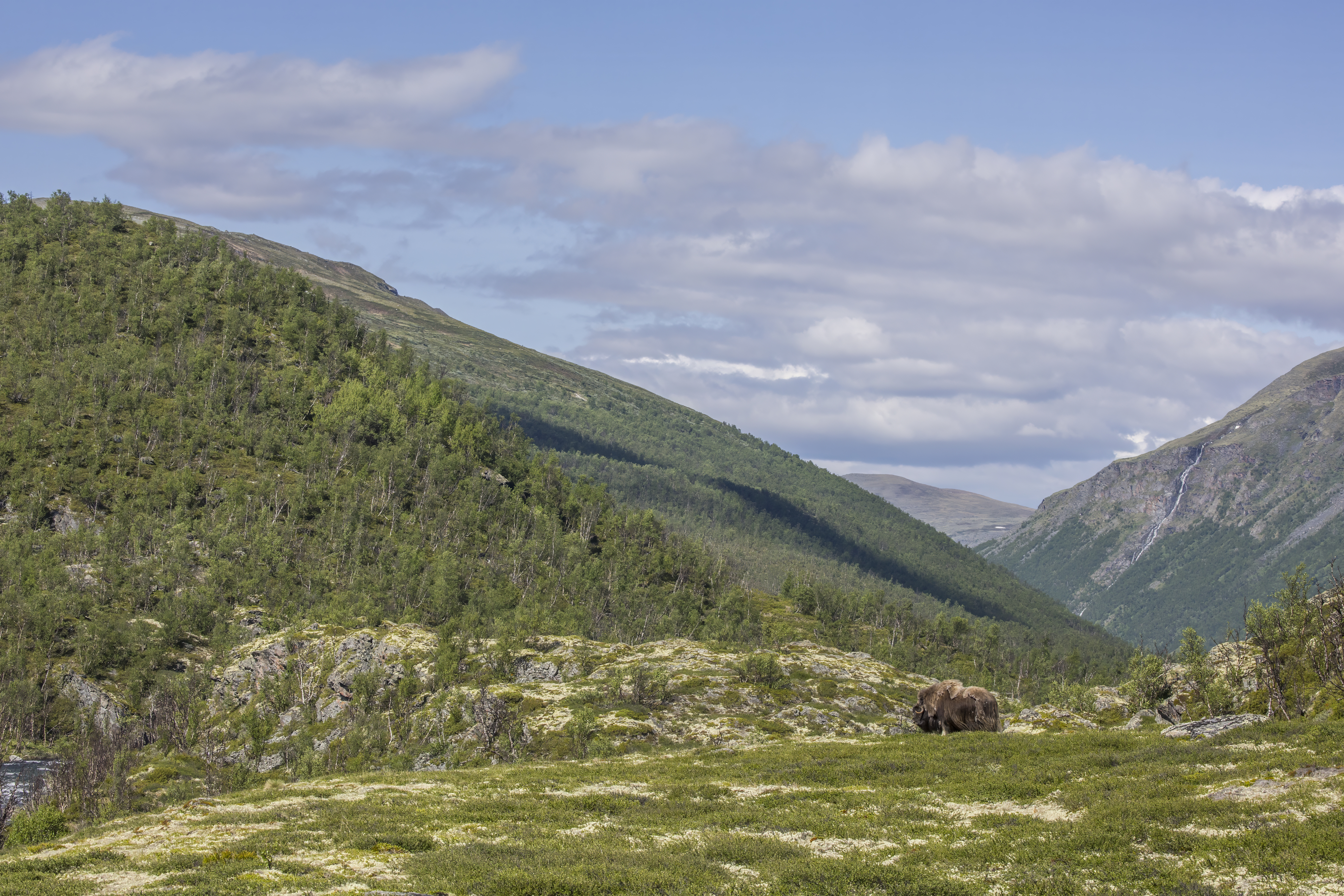
- Muskox in the park in July
- Interactive map of Dovrefjell–Sunndalsfjella National Park
- Location: Innlandet, Trøndelag, and Møre og Romsdal, Norway
- Nearest city: Trondheim
- Coordinates: 62°23′48″N 9°10′23″E
- Area: 1,693 km^{2} (654 sq mi)
- Established: 3 May 2002
- Governing body: Dovrefjell nasjonalparkstyre (Dovrefjell National Park Board)

Dovrefjell–Sunndalsfjella National Park (Norwegian: Dovrefjell-Sunndalsfjella nasjonalpark) is a National Park in Norway. It was established in 2002 to replace and enlarge the former Dovrefjell National Park which had been established in 1974. The park occupies 1,693 square kilometres (654 sq mi) and encompasses areas in three Norwegian counties: Innlandet, Trøndelag, and Møre og Romsdal and includes large parts of the mountain range of Dovrefjell along with the Sunndalsfjella mountains. Together with the National Park, there are eight landscape protected areas and two biotope protected areas that were established adjacent to the park in 2002, comprising a total protected area of 4,366 square kilometres (1,686 sq mi). The park itself lies within Dovre Municipality and Lesja Municipality (in Innlandet county), Oppdal Municipality (in Trøndelag county), and Sunndal Municipality and Molde Municipality (in Møre og Romsdal county).

== Ecology ==
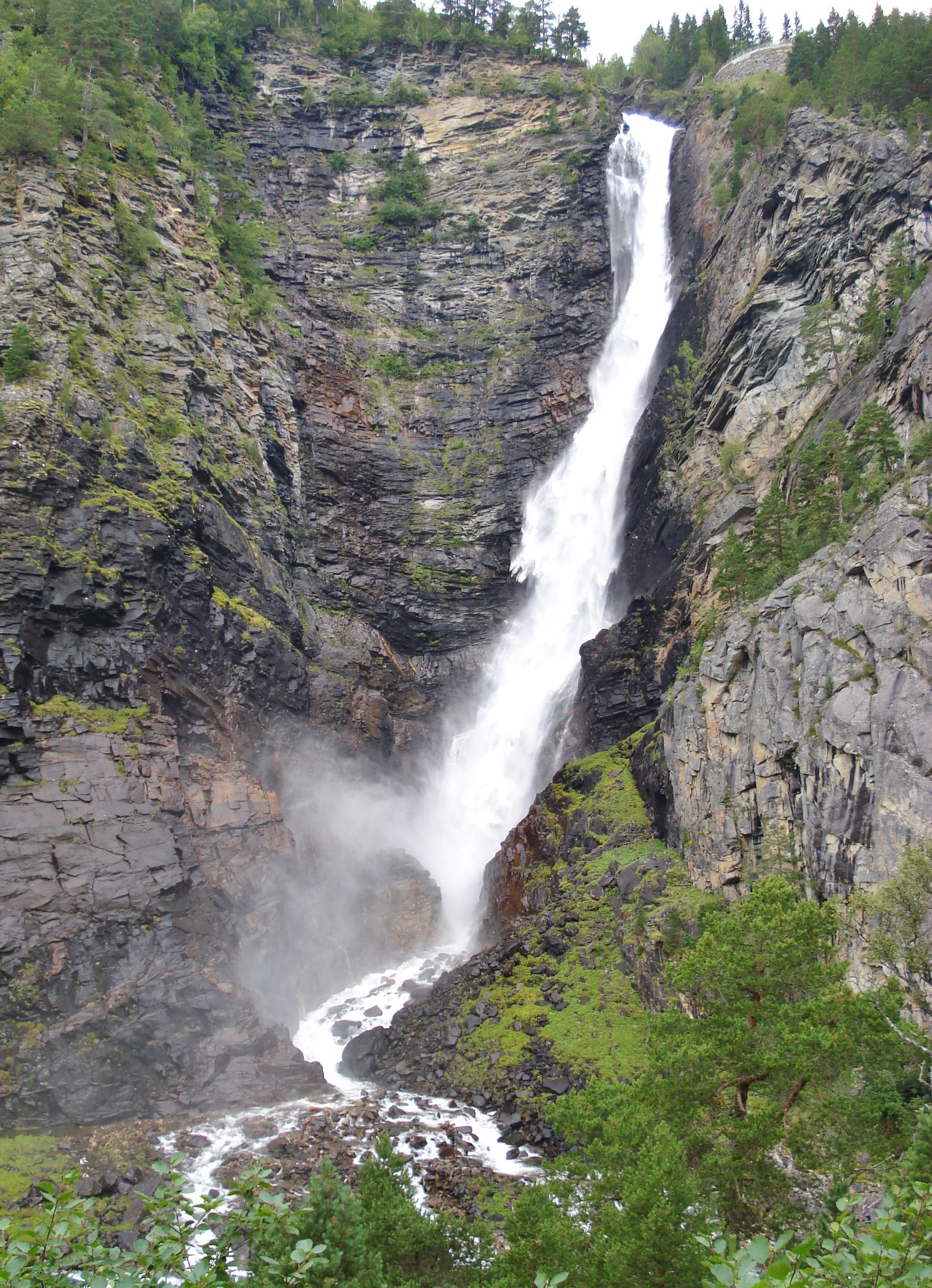
Waterfall Åmotan

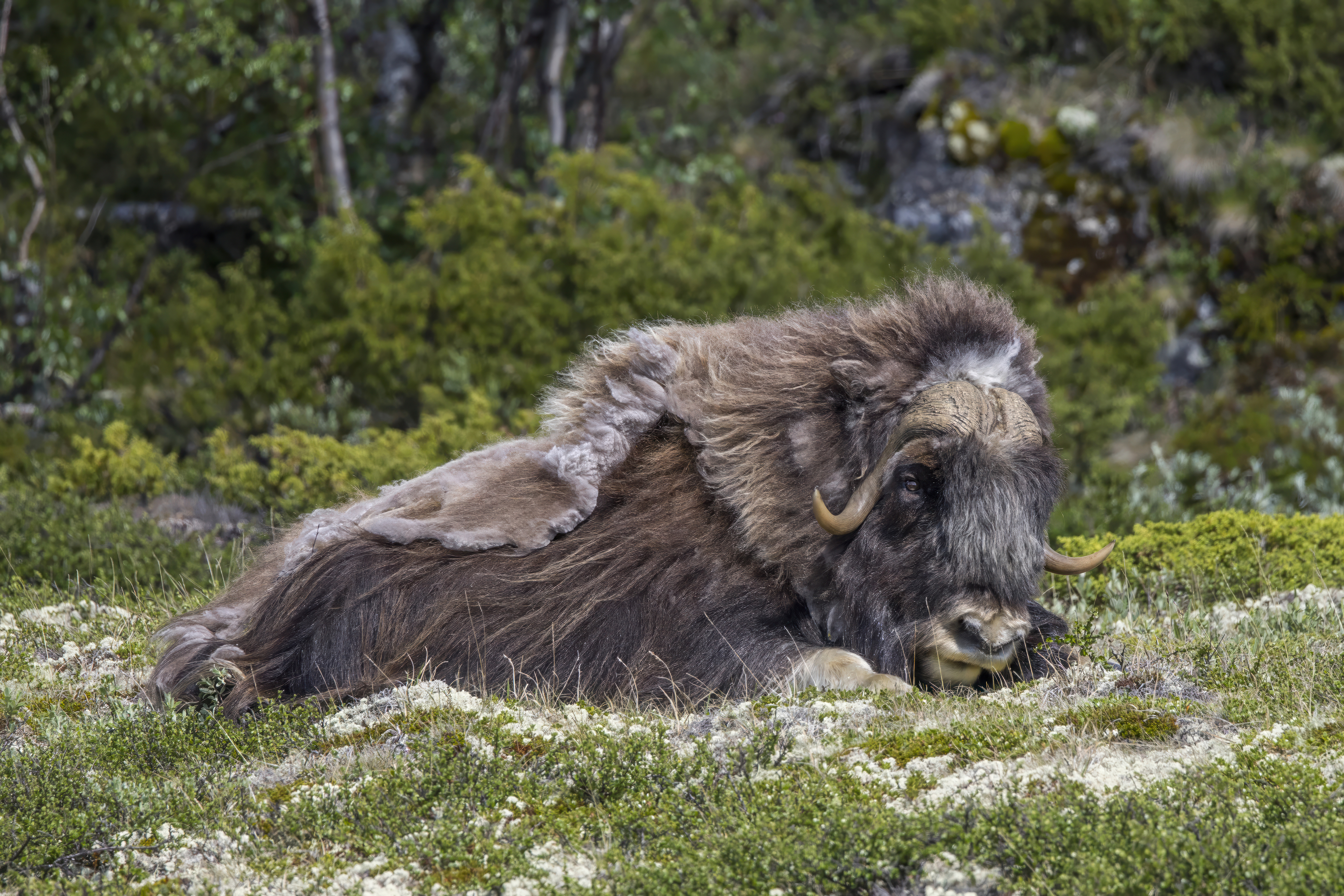
Muskox in the park in July

The National Park was established to:

- preserve a large, continuous and essentially untouched mountain area,
- preserve an alpine ecosystem with its natural biodiversity,
- preserve an important part of the range of the stocks of wild reindeer in Snøhetta and Knutshø,
- safeguard a variation in habitats,
- preserve the landscape morphology and its distinctive geological deposits,
- protect cultural heritage.

The public do have access to experience the nature through the exercise of the traditional and simple outdoor life, with technical infrastructure only established to a very modest extent.

In short: To preserve an intact alpine ecosystem with its indigenous wild reindeer. Together with the reindeer in Rondane National Park the last remaining population of wild Fennoscandian reindeer of possible Beringia origin (other wild Norwegian reindeer are of European origin and have interbred with domesticated reindeer to a various extent), wolverine, and various large birds as golden eagle and gyrfalcon can be seen, and also the recently (1947) imported (and potentially dangerous) musk oxen. Arctic fox was common a hundred years ago, diminished gradually from around 1900 and went extinct in the area around the year 1990. A reintroduction program from 2010 on has so far been successful.

Some of the plant life predates the last ice age. There are many endemisms in the area.

The highest mountain in the park is the 2,286-metre (7,500 ft) Snøhetta. Due to rather long walks between mostly unstaffed huts, great areas without huts and trails and harsh and unstable weather conditions, this area is recommended for experienced and well-equipped wanderers only.

Another natural attraction in the park is the 156-metre (512 ft) high waterfall down in Åmotan (62°30′36.14″N 9°03′32.26″E). It is located at along Road 70 between Oppdal and Sunndalsøra at the northern border of Åmotan-Grøvudalen Landscape Protected Area, on the northern edge of Dovrefjell–Sunndalsfjella National Park.

== Administration ==
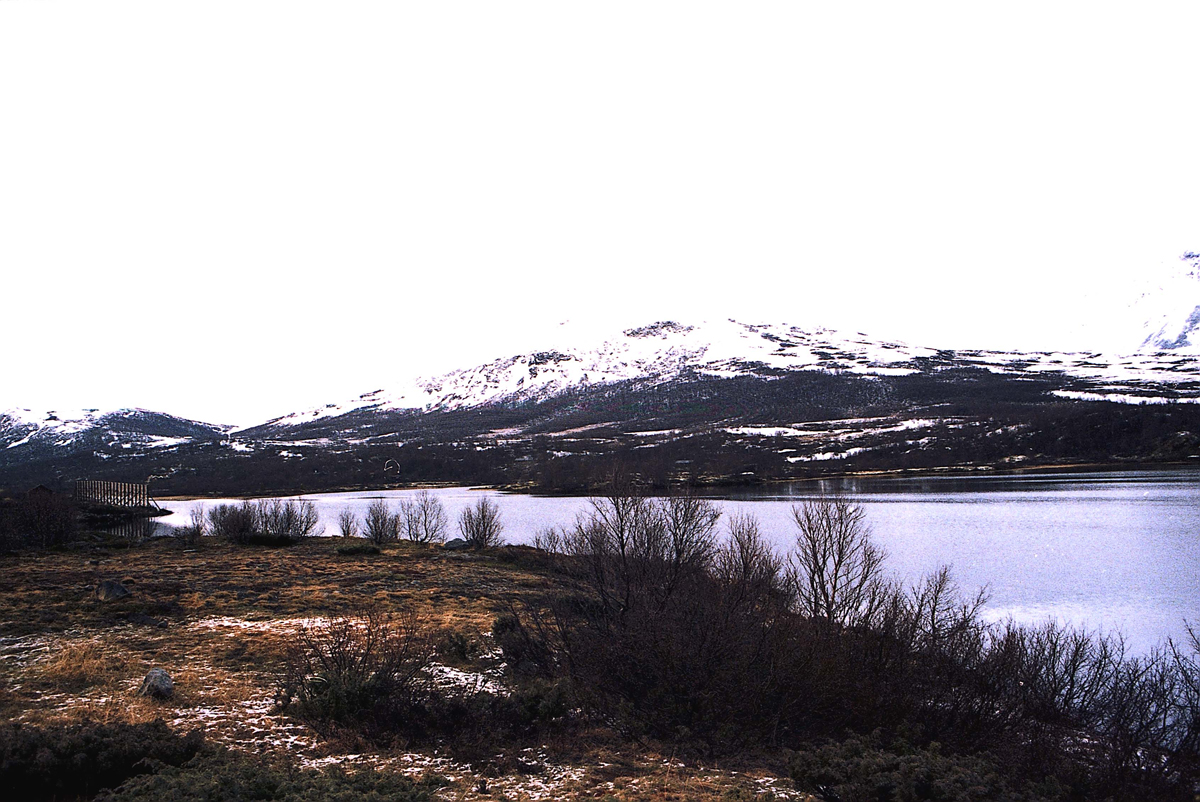
Dovrefjell in late autumn

The park is divided into a major western part and a minor eastern part by the European route E6 paralleled with the main railway between Oslo and Trondheim. Altogether the protected area amounts 4,365 square kilometres (1,685 sq mi) and also includes areas in the county of Innlandet in addition to the three of the National Park.

The park, its five adjacent landscape protection areas, and two biotope-protected areas are managed by the National Park Board of Dovrefjell. This is a governmental board: the members are from the same eight municipalities and four counties as the former Dovrefjell Council. They are nominated by those municipalities and counties, and appointed by the Ministry for the Environment. The members are much the same persons (local mayors) as in the Dovrefjell council and one may still consider Dovrefjell–Sunndalsfjella National Park as being managed locally.

The former management model from July 2003 was a trial intended to last until July 2007. The final decision on the permanent management model was made in August 2010 and the new board was formally established on 4 January 2011. The Dovrefjell council was closed down during 2011 and its website closed.

From 2007 to 2011 the Dovrefjell Council managed the National Park and co-ordinated the management of the other areas. The council consisted of the eight involved municipalities and four counties, with political representatives, usually the mayors, elected by the members. Except for the National Park, the conservation areas were managed by the municipality or municipalities (some PAs comprises more than one municipality). The council's responsibility for coordinating regional planning and society development, mainly through the European Charter for Sustainable Tourism of The EUROPARC Federation are now being transferred to the new board.

== See also ==
- Dovre National Park
- List of national parks of Norway
- Tourism in Norway
- Norwegian Mountain Touring Association
