= Innlandet =

County in Eastern Norway

Innlandet County Innlandet fylke Southern Sámi: Sisdajven fylhkentjïelte
- County
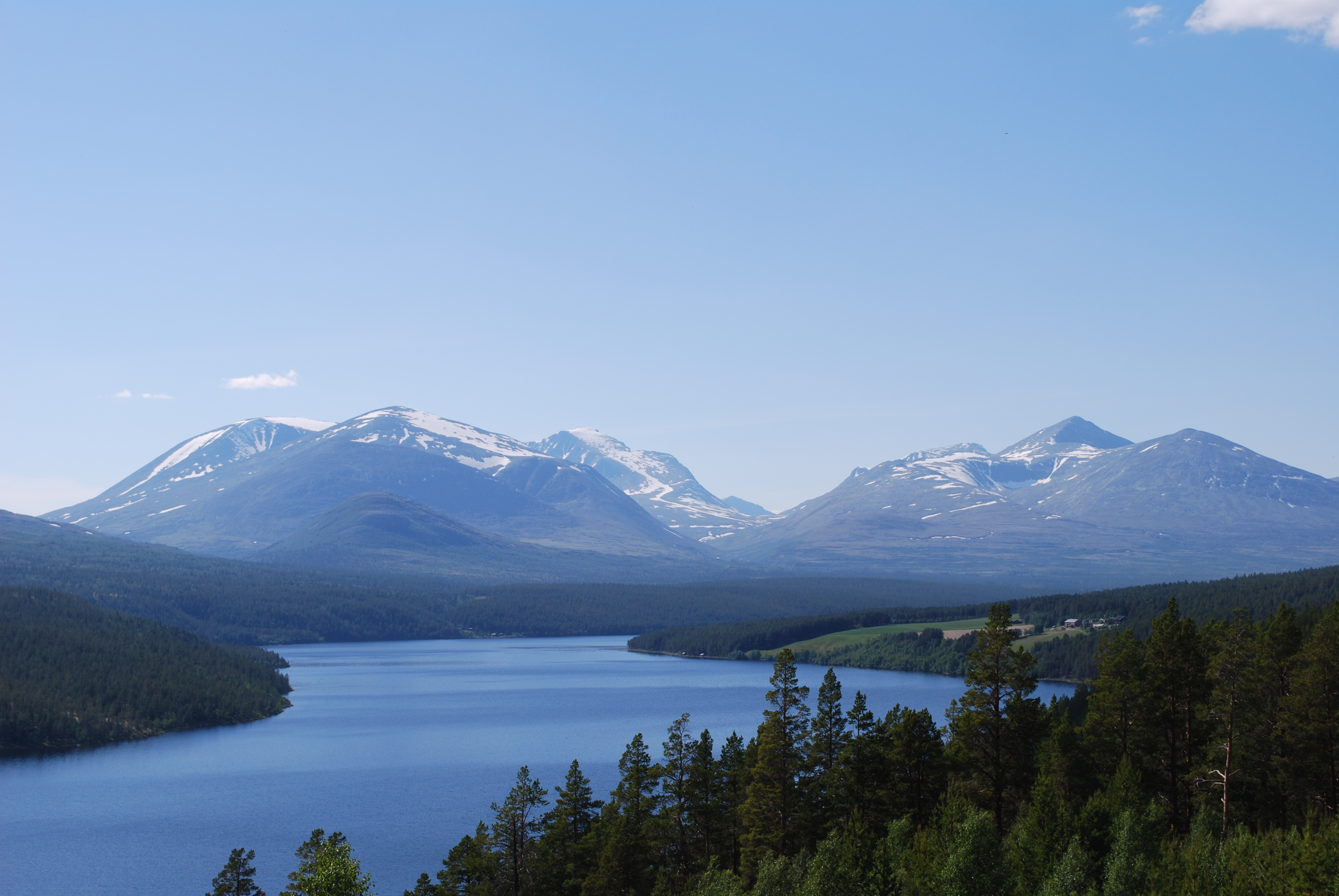
- Atnsjøen and Rondane

- Flag Coat of arms

- Location within Innlandet Location within Norway
- Coordinates: 61.5°N 10°E
- Country: Norway
- County: Innlandet
- District: Eastern Norway
- Established: 1 Jan 2020
  - Preceded by: Oppland and Hedmark
- Administrative centre: Hamar

Government
  - Body: Innlandet County Municipality
  - Governor (2019): Knut Storberget (Ap)
  - County mayor (2023): Thomas Breen (Ap)

Area
  - Total: 52,072 km^{2} (20,105 sq mi)
  - Land: 49,391 km^{2} (19,070 sq mi)
  - Water: 2,681 km^{2} (1,035 sq mi) 5.1%
  - Rank: #1 in Norway
- Highest elevation: 2,469 m (8,100 ft)
- Lowest elevation: 120 m (390 ft)

Population (2021)
  - Total: 370,603
  - Rank: #7 in Norway
  - Density: 7.5/km^{2} (19/sq mi)
  - Change (10 years): ▲ +2.2%
- Demonym: Innlending

Official language
  - Norwegian form: Neutral
- Time zone: UTC+01:00 (CET)
  - Summer (DST): UTC+02:00 (CEST)
- ISO 3166 code: NO-34
- Website: Official website

Innlandet is a county in Norway. It was created on 1 January 2020 with the merger of the old counties of Oppland and Hedmark (Jevnaker Municipality and Lunner Municipality were transferred to the neighboring county of Viken on the same date). The new county has an area of 52,113 square kilometres (20,121 sq mi), making it the largest county in Norway after the division of the old Troms og Finnmark county in 2024.

The region was known as Opplandene or Opplanda since the middle ages. Historically part of Akershus, Oplandene County existed from 1757 to 1781, when it was divided into Christians County and Hedemarken County, also known as Western and Eastern Oplandene. In 1919 the two counties were renamed Oppland and Hedmark, and in 2020 they were again merged under the name Innlandet (with the exception of Jevnaker Municipality and Lunner Municipality, which went to the new county of Viken). This present name is a newly constructed name with no historical basis as a subdivision name and was recommended not to be used by the Norwegian Language Council. It translates to "The Inland". The county covers approximately 17% of the total area of the mainland area of Norway. It stretches from Akershus, Buskerud, and the Oslo region in the south to Trøndelag county in the north. In the northwest, the county borders Møre og Romsdal and the Vestland county in the west. To the east the county borders the Swedish counties of Jämtland, Värmland and Dalarna.

The northern and western areas of the county are dominated by the mountainous areas Rondane, Dovrefjell and Jotunheimen. The Galdhøpiggen mountain is located within the Innlandet part of Jotunheimen and at 2,469 m (8,100 ft) it is the tallest mountain in Norway. The eastern and southern areas of the county are mainly made up of forests and agricultural land. Mjøsa, Norway's largest lake, is located in the southern end of Innlandet, and Glomma the longest river in Norway also flows through the county.

Agriculture and forestry are two important industries in the county with approximately 20% of Norway's agricultural production and about 40% of timber.

The 1994 Winter Olympics were held at Lillehammer, the second-largest city in Innlandet county.

== Municipalities ==
Innlandet County has a total of 46 municipalities:

No.	Municipality No.	Name	Former Municipality No.	Former County
1	3428	Alvdal	0438 Alvdal	Hedmark
2	3431	Dovre	0511 Dovre	Oppland
3	3416	Eidskog	0420 Eidskog	Hedmark
4	3420	Elverum	0427 Elverum	Hedmark
5	3425	Engerdal	0434 Engerdal	Hedmark
6	3450	Etnedal	0541 Etnedal	Oppland
7	3429	Folldal	0439 Folldal	Hedmark
8	3441	Gausdal	0522 Gausdal	Oppland
9	3407	Gjøvik	0502 Gjøvik	Oppland
10	3446	Gran	0534 Gran	Oppland
11	3417	Grue	0423 Grue	Hedmark
12	3403	Hamar	0403 Hamar	Hedmark
13	3401	Kongsvinger	0402 Kongsvinger	Hedmark
14	3432	Lesja	0512 Lesja	Oppland
15	3405	Lillehammer	0501 Lillehammer	Oppland
16	3434	Lom	0514 Lom	Oppland
17	3412	Løten	0415 Løten	Hedmark
18	3451	Nord-Aurdal	0542 Nord-Aurdal	Oppland
19	3436	Nord-Fron	0516 Nord-Fron	Oppland
20	3414	Nord-Odal	0418 Nord-Odal	Hedmark
21	3448	Nordre Land	0538 Nordre Land	Oppland
22	3430	Os	0441 Os	Hedmark
23	3424	Rendalen	0432 Rendalen	Hedmark
24	3439	Ringebu	0520 Ringebu	Oppland
25	3411	Ringsaker	0412 Ringsaker	Hedmark
26	3437	Sel	0517 Sel	Oppland
27	3433	Skjåk	0513 Skjåk	Oppland
28	3413	Stange	0417 Stange	Hedmark
29	3423	Stor-Elvdal	0430 Stor-Elvdal	Hedmark
30	3447	Søndre Land	0536 Søndre Land	Oppland
31	3449	Sør-Aurdal	0540 Sør-Aurdal	Oppland
32	3438	Sør-Fron	0519 Sør-Fron	Oppland
33	3415	Sør-Odal	0419 Sør-Odal	Hedmark
34	3426	Tolga	0436 Tolga	Hedmark
35	3421	Trysil	0428 Trysil	Hedmark
36	3427	Tynset	0437 Tynset	Hedmark
37	3454	Vang	0545 Vang	Oppland
38	3452	Vestre Slidre	0543 Vestre Slidre	Oppland
39	3443	Vestre Toten	0529 Vestre Toten	Oppland
40	3435	Vågå	0515 Vågå	Oppland
41	3419	Våler	0426 Våler	Hedmark
42	3442	Østre Toten	0528 Østre Toten	Oppland
43	3440	Øyer	0521 Øyer	Oppland
44	3453	Øystre Slidre	0544 Øystre Slidre	Oppland
45	3422	Åmot	0429 Åmot	Hedmark
46	3418	Åsnes	0425 Åsnes	Hedmark

== Settlements ==
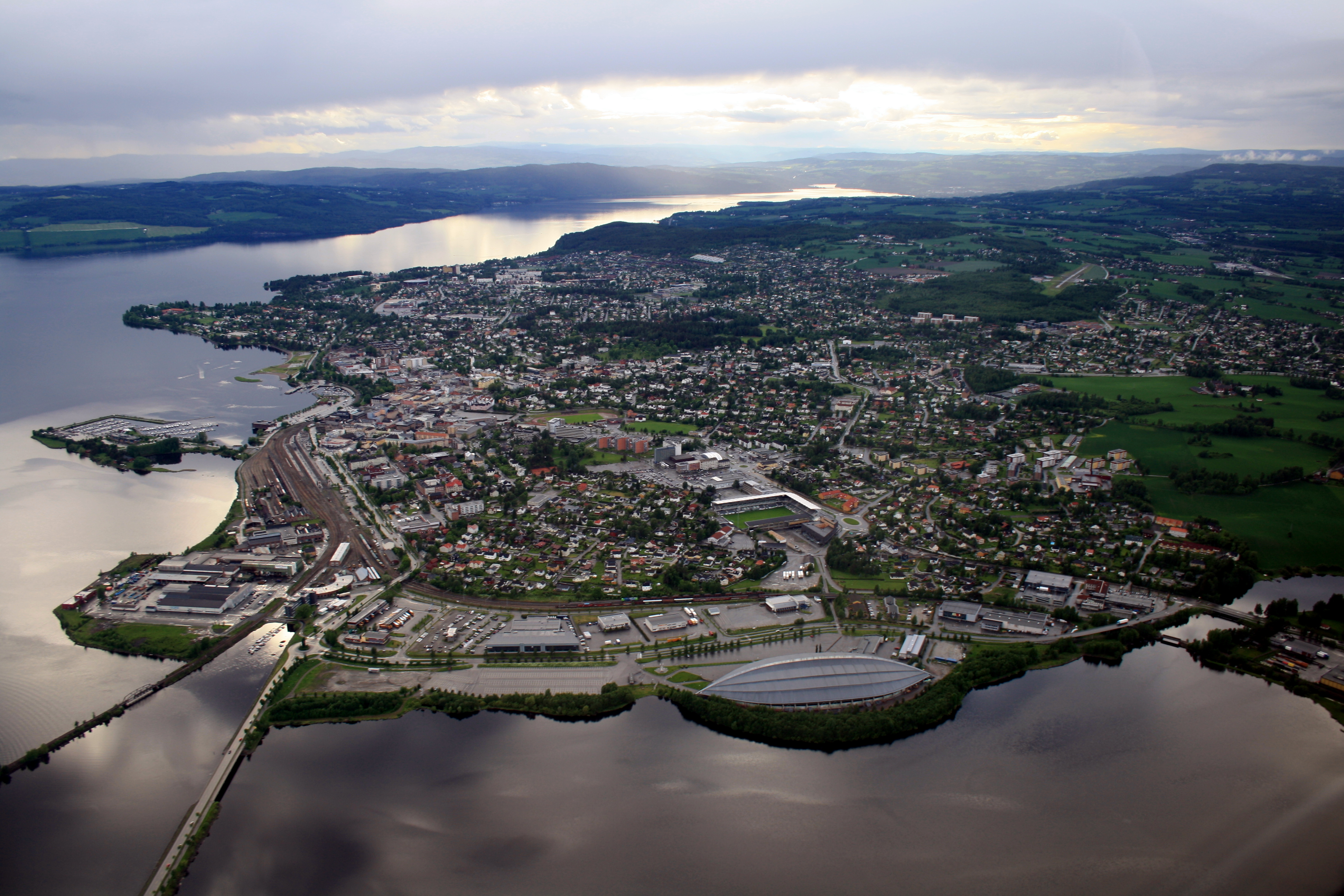
Hamar, the largest city in Innlandet.

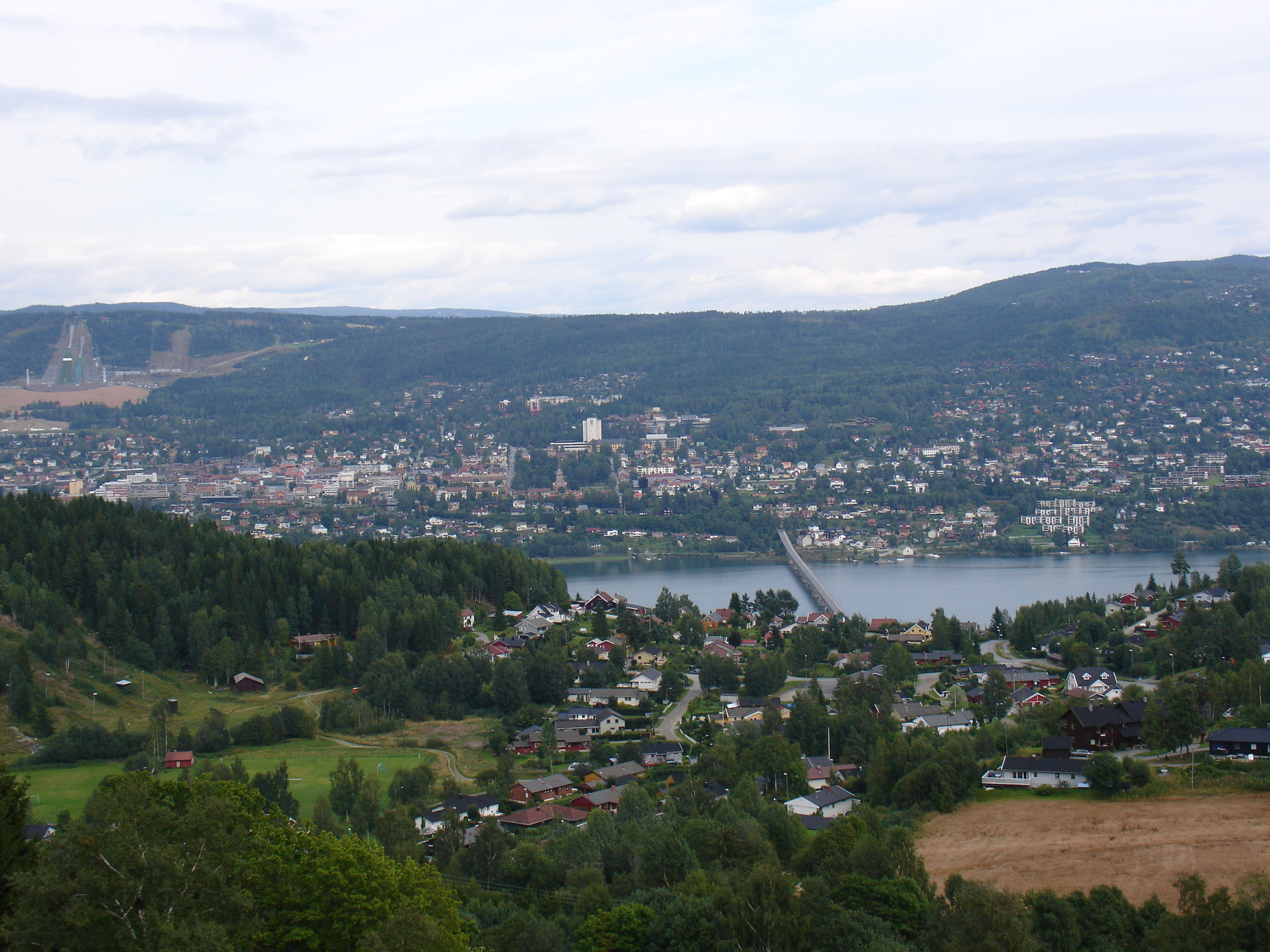
Lillehammer, the second largest city.

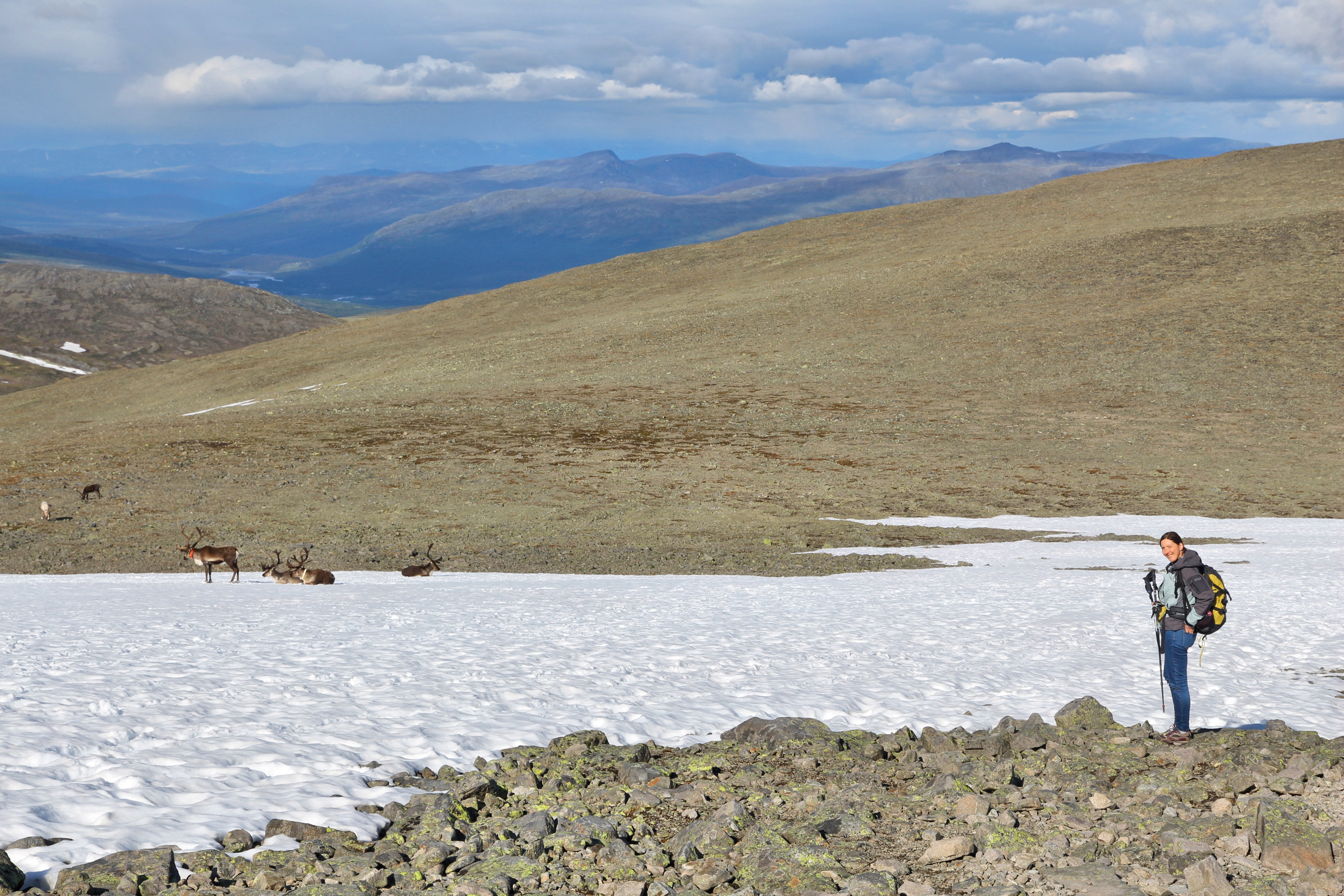
Tourist observes reindeer next to Besseggen trail in Jotunheimen National Park.

Most of the settlements in Innlandet are fairly small. As of 1 January 2020 Hamar is the largest with a population of 28,434. Lillehammer, Gjøvik, Elverum, Kongsvinger and Brumunddal are the only other cities with populations above 10,000. However, Raufoss, Moelv, Vinstra, Fagernes and Otta also have city status.

== Churches and parishes ==
The Church of Norway Diocese of Hamar is composed of the entirety of Innlandet county plus Lunner Municipality in neighboring Akershus county.

== Geography ==
=== Mountains ===
- Galdhøpiggen 2,469 m (8,100 ft)
- Blåkampen 1,662 m (5,453 ft)
- Høgvagltindene 1,576 m (5,171 ft)
- Mjellknapp 1,678 m (5,505 ft)
- Røykeskardhøi 1,808 m (5,932 ft)
- Søndre Svarthåmåren 1,854 m (6,083 ft)
- Søndre Kjølhaugen 1,768 m (5,801 ft)
- Sørhellhøi 1,951 m (6,401 ft)
- Sørhellhøin
- Søverhøi
- Steinahøfjellet 1,711 m (5,614 ft)
- Svånåtindene, mountain range

== Government ==
A county (fylke) is the chief local administrative area in Norway. The whole country is divided into 11 counties. A county is also an election area, with popular votes taking place every 4 years. In Innlandet, the government of the county is the Innlandet County Municipality. It includes 57 members who are elected to form a county council (Fylkesting). Heading the Fylkesting is the county mayor (fylkesordfører). Since 2020, the Innlandet County Municipality has been led by Even Aleksander Hagen, the county mayor. The county also has a County Governor (Statsforvalteren) who is the representative of the King and Government of Norway. Knut Storberget is the current County Governor of Innlandet. The offices for the county governor are located in Lillehammer.

== See also ==
- Districts in Innlandet
- Former municipalities in Innlandet
- Lakes in Innlandet
- Rivers in Innlandet
- Towns and Cities in Innlandet
- Valleys in Innlandet
- Villages in Innlandet
