= Pilgrim's Route =

Pilgrimage in Norway

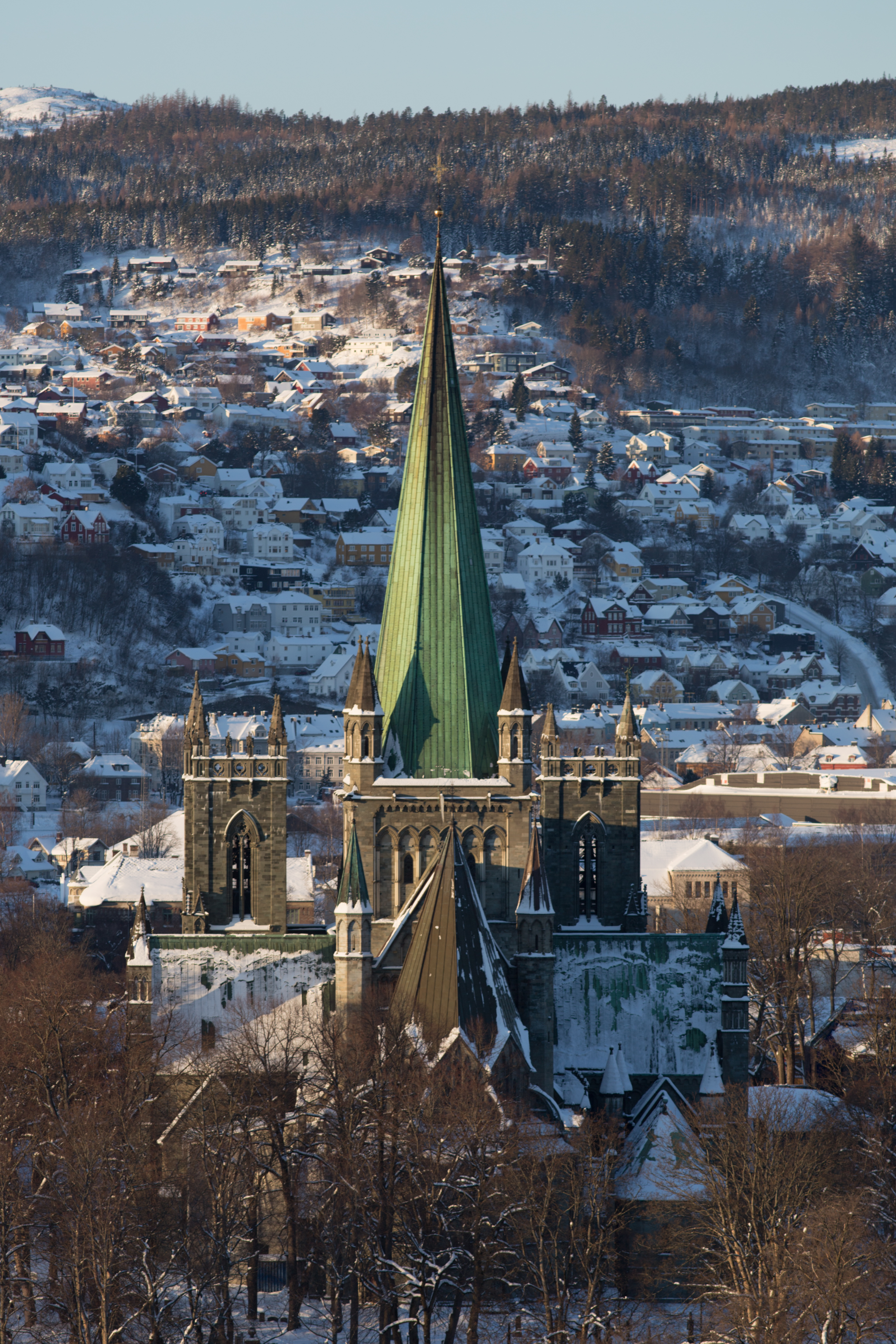
Nidaros Cathedral, the pilgrimage destination

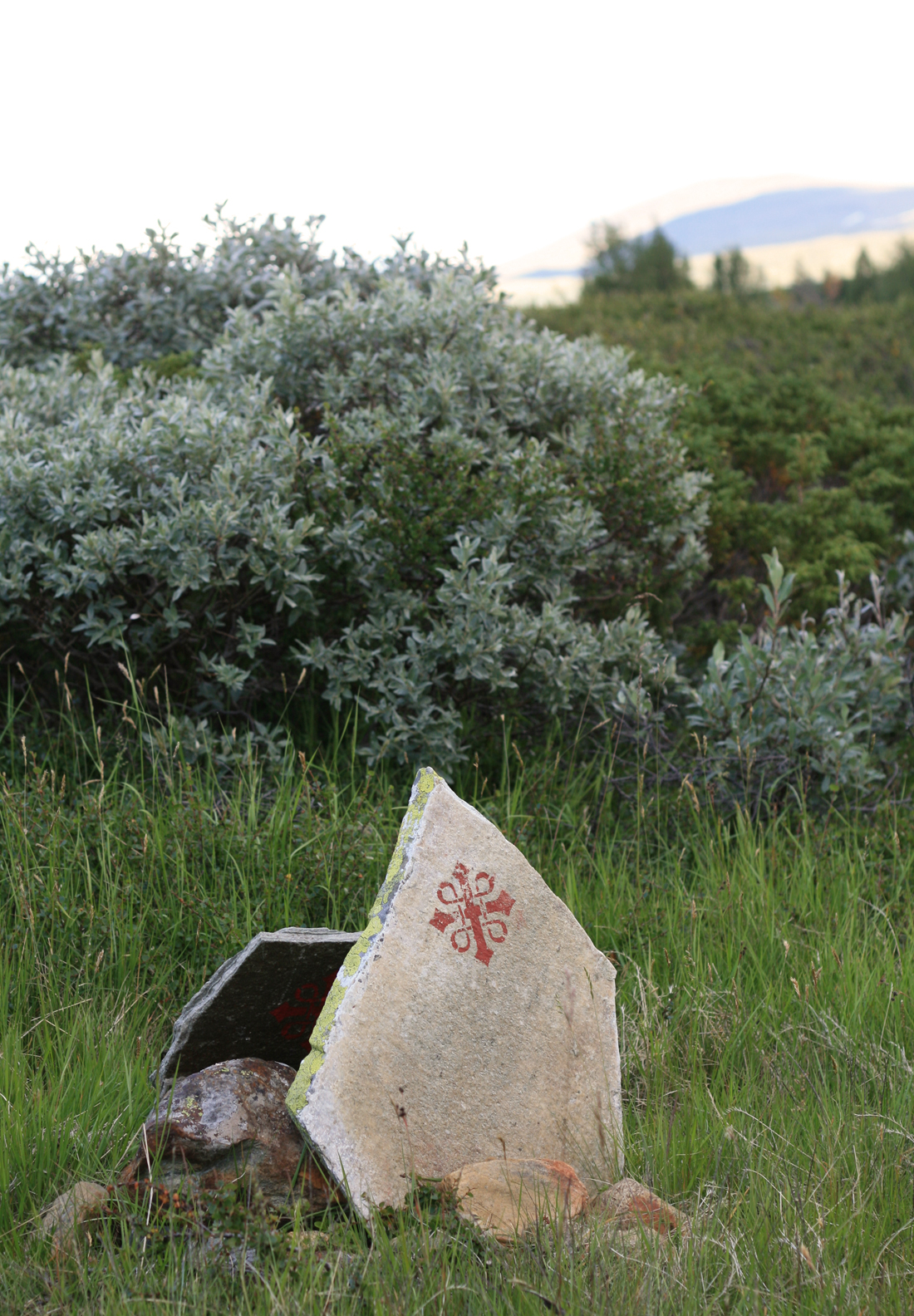
Route marker in Dovre Municipality

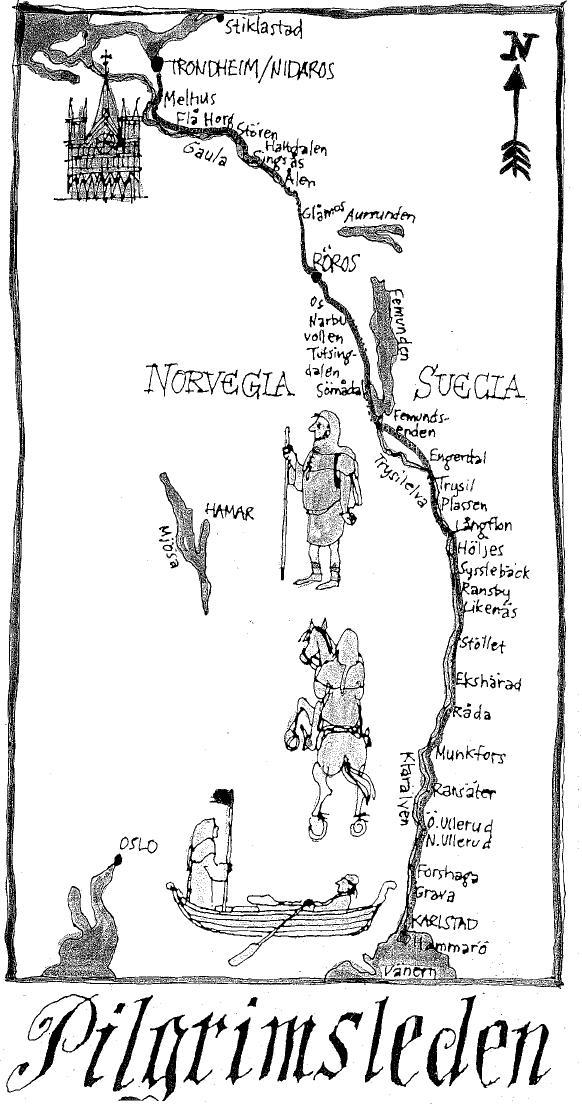
Illustrated route of Pilegrimsleden by Nils Gunnar Svensson (2006)

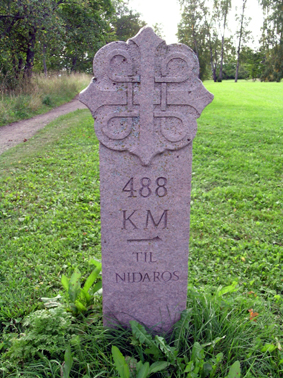
Kilometer post for Pilegrimsleden in Hamar Municipality

The Pilgrim's Route, (Norwegian: Pilegrimsleden) also known as St. Olav's Way or the Old Kings' Road, is a pilgrimage route to the Nidaros Cathedral in Trondheim, Norway. The cathedral is the site of the medieval tomb of St. Olav, who brought Christianity to Norway. The main route is approximately 640 kilometres (400 mi) long. It starts in the ancient part of Oslo and heads north along the lake Mjøsa, up the Gudbrandsdalen valley, over the Dovrefjell mountains, and down the through the Oppdal and Gauldalen valleys to end at the Nidaros Cathedral.

Nidaros Cathedral is a popular place of Evangelical-Lutheran Christian pilgrimage, with several thousand pilgrims visiting it each year. Mass and the Divine Office, according to the Evangelical-Lutheran tradition, are celebrated daily at Nidaros Cathedral, in addition to other prayer services that are held there throughout the day for pilgrims. Those who complete the Pilgrim's Route receive a pilgrim certificate that is granted by Nidaros Cathedral.

== Route ==
Although the Pilgrim's Route over the Dovrefjell mountains is only one of several pilgrimage routes in Norway, it is arguably the most famous. It connected the historically important Norwegian cities of Oslo and Nidaros (now Trondheim).

=== Oldest known route ===
The oldest known route over the Dovrefjell mountains which followed the Lågen river valley at the Kongsgården (lit. 'King's Farm') at Tofte, just past Dovre Church in Dovre Municipality (slightly south of present-day village of Dombås). It followed a lower and more easterly route which followed the drainage to the east of Tofte, and then proceeded over the Dovrefjell mountains to join the route in Oppdal Municipality.

=== King's Way ===
The "King's Way" traveled up through the Gudbrandsdalen valley and left the Lågen river valley at Tofte Kongsgården (lit. 'King's Farm') shortly past the Dovre Church in Dovre Municipality (just south of present-day village of Dombås). This route went more directly over the Dovrefjell mountains into Oppdal Municipality.

== Shelters ==
The historically heavy stream of pilgrims which visited the shrine of St. Olaf in Trondheim annually prior to the Reformation resulted in the erection of mountain stations (Norwegian: fjellstue) where the pilgrims could find food and shelter. Stations were erected at Kongsvoll, Drivstuen, Fogstuen, and later at Hjerkinn.

In speaking of the route, Knut Gjerset quotes Peder Claussøn Friis as writing in the late 16th century, "But in the winter people of high estate, as well as members of the court, travel mostly this way, because however high and deep the snow may fall, it blows together on the high mountains and becomes so hard men and horses can walk on it. The bonder [farmers] run over it on skis and snow-shoes. There are three stations: Drivstuen, Herdekinn and Fogstuen built on this same mountain in order that travelers may find lodging there...at the stations there are implements and dry wood, so that the traveler may build themselves fire, and not suffer from cold, when they have to remain over night, and cannot find the way across the mountain."

== History ==
There is clear evidence that this route had seen heavy use in the early Norwegian Iron Age. Oppdal on the route was located at a crossroads for traffic from Trondheim, traffic over the Dovrefjell mountain range, and the Sunndal on the west coast. At Oppdal there are over 700 Viking Age grave mounds indicating that Viking trade routes passed through these valleys.

It is appropriately termed "The King's Road". Virtually every king of Norway traveled this road. Those for whom we easily find records of their passage range from the first King of Norway through the last King able to pass that way before the road was completely replaced with modern rail and tarmac.

Harald Fairhair or Harold I was the first king of all Norway who crossed the Dovrefjell on The King's Road. Harald Hårfagres saga describes an expedition he led up the Gudbrandsdal, and north over Dovrefjell on his way to success at the battle of Orkadal.

King Harald went far and wide through Gautland, and many were the battles he fought there on both sides of the river, and in general he was victorious. In one of these battles fell Hrane Gauzke; and then the king took his whole land north of the river and west of the Veneren, and also Vermaland. And after he turned back there-from, he set Duke Guthorm as chief to defend the country, and left a great force with him. King Harald himself went first to the Uplands, where he remained a while, and then proceeded northwards over the Dovrefjeld to Throndhjem, where he dwelt for a long time. Harald began to have children. By Asa he had four sons. The eldest was Guthorm. Halfdan the Black and Halfdan the White were twins. Sigfrod was the fourth. They were all brought up in Throndhjem with all honor.

=== Kings ===
- The Saga of St. Olaf says that in the year 1021 and again in 1024 King Olaf (1015–1028) travelled north through the Gudbrandsdalen valley to Dovrefjell, where he crossed to Nidaros and remained there all winter.
- Magnus Berrføtts saga describes King Haakon Magnusson's death in the Dovrefjell mountains in 1094. While crossing them he chased a rock ptarmigan until he got sick and died, leaving Magnus King of Norway.
- Christian V (King of Denmark & Norway from 1670 to 1699) crossed the Dovrefjell mountains on horseback in 1685.
- Frederik IV (King of Denmark & Norway from 1699 to 1730) crossed the Dovrefjell mountains in 1704 by cariole. The Norwegian cariole at that time only held one passenger, and the driver or attendant stood or sat behind on a narrow board above the axle.
- Christian VI (King of Denmark & Norway from 1730 to 1746) crossed the Dovrefjell mountains in a 4-horse carriage in 1733. An illustrated manuscript of King Christian and Queen Sophie Magdalene's five-month-long journey through Norway is preserved in the Amalienborg Palace in Copenhagen, of which a facsimile edition was published in 1992.
- King Frederik V's initials remained carved at Tofte from his passage through.
- Christian Frederick passed this way, as did Karl Johan.

=== Railway lines ===
The Norwegian railway line Rørosbanen was opened on 13 October 1877, connecting Hamar and Trondheim via the towns of Elverum and Røros. At this point, the difficult route up through the Dovrefjell mountains lost most of its appeal, compared with the relative ease of taking a train to Trondheim. The final end came on 17 September 1921, when the Dovre Line was completed. Starting at Dombås in Dovre municipality, it passes over the mountainous stretches of the Dovrefjell, before merging with the Rørosbanen again at Støren. It passes close to the Old King's Road's historic route, but is to the west along a route which, although longer, has a lesser grade, as is required for rail.

== Present-day route ==
Although the Pilgrim's Route fell into disuse with the arrival of the railroad, it has recently been revived. Today it is promoted and is used by modern travelers as a long-distance hiking trail. There is a Pilgrim's Office in Oslo which gives advice to travelers and a Pilgrim Centre in Trondheim, under the aegis of the Nidaros Cathedral, which awards certificates to successful travelers upon the completion of their journey.

== See also ==
- St. Olavsleden

== Other sources ==
- Raju, Alison (2015) The Pilgrim Road to Trondheim: Oslo to Nidaros Cathedral (Trondheim: Museumsforlaget) ISBN 978-82-83-05004-2
- Luthen, Eivind (1992) I pilegrimenes fotspor til Nidaros (Oslo: Cappelen) ISBN 978-82-02-13249-1
- Kollandsrud, Mari (1997) Pilgrimsleden til Nidaros (Oslo: Gyldendal) ISBN 978-82-05-24786-4
- Hansen, Knut Ingar (1997) Pilegrimsgang til Nidaros (Oslo: Gyldendal Tiden) ISBN 978-82-478-0028-7
- Söderlund, Staffan; Marie Sjöström (2016) St Olavsleden: pilgrimsfärd från hav till hav, en guide (Växjö: Vildmarksbiblioteket) ISBN 978-91-864-3353-6
