= Dovre (disambiguation) =

Dovre can refer to:

== Places ==
=== Norway ===
- Dovre Municipality, a municipality in Innlandet county
- Dovre (village), a village in Dovre municipality in Innlandet county
- Dovre Church, a church in Dovre municipality in Innlandet county
- Dovre National Park, a national park in Innlandet county
- Dovrefjell, a mountain range sometimes referred to as Dovre in south-central Norway
- Dovrefjell–Sunndalsfjella National Park, a national park centered on the Dovrefjell mountain range in Central Norway
- Dovre Region, the area surrounding the Dovrefjell mountain range

=== United States ===
- Dovre, Wisconsin, a small town in the state of Wisconsin

== Other ==
- Dovre Line, the main railway line running between Oslo and Trondheim in Norway
- I Dovregubbens hall, the Norwegian title of the musical piece In the Hall of the Mountain King, by Edvard Grieg
