= Sunndalsfjella =

Mountain range in Norway

Geography
- Location: Southern Norway
- Range coordinates: 62.3190°N 9.3889°E

Sunndalsfjella is a mountain range in southern Norway. The mountain range is an extension of the Dovrefjell mountains. It lies to the north of the village of Dombås along the county borders of Møre og Romsdal, Trøndelag, and Innlandet. The range is transversed by the European route E6 highway, with most of the mountain range lying within Dovrefjell–Sunndalsfjella National Park and its immediate surrounding areas. The mountains primarily are located in Dovre Municipality, Sunndal Municipality, and Oppdal Municipality.

Sunndalsfjella has 259 glaciers and 23 mountain peaks that have an elevation above 1,800 metres (5,900 ft).
