= Anita Killi =

Norwegian animator and film director (born 1968)

- Born: 17 January 1968 (age 58); Stavanger, Norway
- Occupations: Animator, filmmaker
- Notable work: Angry Man; The Hedge of Thorns

Anita Killi (born 17 January 1968 in Stavanger) is a Norwegian animator and film director.

== Background and work ==
Anita Killi studied graphic design and illustration at the Norwegian National Academy of Craft and Art Industry (SHKS) in Oslo between 1988 and 1990 and animation at Volda University College between 1990 and 1992. She mastered in animation at SHKS in 1996. She also studied in Estonia.

Anita Killi has made several award-winning animated films, among others The Hedge of Thorns (2001), distinguished as the Norwegian film to win the most international awards in 2002. In addition to animated art shorts, she has also made animated commercials and sequences in documentaries and industrial films. In 2009 she completed the animated film Angry Man. The film, dealing with domestic violence, is based on Gro Dahle and Svein Nyhus's picture book of the same title. As of 2011, the film had been shown at almost one hundred film festivals and won over forty awards, reportedly making Anita Killi the most awarded filmmaker in the world in 2010.

Since 1995, Killi has run the animation studio Trollfilm AS from her family's farm in Dovre Municipality. The technique employed in most of her films is a combination of cutouts and object animation in the multiplane technique, i.e. animation filmed in several planes.

Killi mentions Yuri Norstein and Michaël Dudok de Wit as sources of inspiration.

== Selected filmography ==
- 1992: Glassballen, 4 min. (director)
- 1994: Sirkel, 5 min. (animator)
- 1996: Lávrasiid Áigi or Solens datter (international title Daughter of the Sun), 12 min. (director)
- 1997: Langt, langt borte (Far, Far Away), 4 min. (animator)
- 1999: Kongen som ville ha mer enn en krone (The King Who Wanted More than One Crown)
- 2001: Tornehekken (The Hedge of Thorns), 13 min. (director)
- 2009: Sinna mann (Angry Man), animation based on the picture book Sinna Mann
