= Eystein Church =

Church in Innlandet, Norway

- Eysteinkyrkja
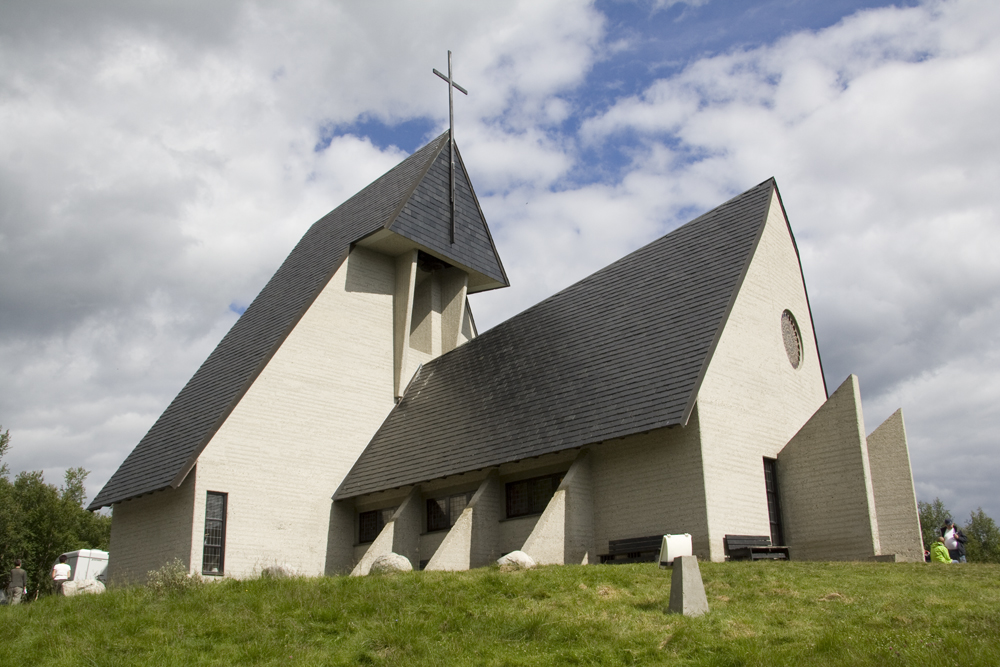
- View of the church
- Eystein Church
- 62°13′21″N 9°34′06″E
- Location: Dovre Municipality, Innlandet
- Country: Norway
- Denomination: Church of Norway
- Churchmanship: Evangelical Lutheran

History
- Status: Parish church
- Founded: 1969
- Consecrated: 3 August 1969

Architecture
- Functional status: Active
- Architect(s): Magnus Poulsson and Anton Poulsson
- Architectural type: Long church
- Style: Modern
- Completed: 1969 (57 years ago)

Specifications
- Capacity: 110
- Materials: Concrete

Administration
- Diocese: Hamar bispedømme
- Deanery: Nord-Gudbrandsdal prosti
- Parish: Dombås
- Norwegian Cultural Heritage Site
- Type: Church
- Status: Not protected
- ID: 84585

Eystein Church (Norwegian: Eysteinkyrkja) is a parish church of the Church of Norway in Dovre Municipality in Innlandet county, Norway. It is located in the village of Hjerkinn. It is one of the two churches for the Dombås parish which is part of the Nord-Gudbrandsdal prosti (deanery) in the Diocese of Hamar. The white, modern, cast concrete church was built in a long church design in 1969 using plans drawn up by the architects Magnus Poulsson and Anton Poulsson. The church seats about 110 people.

== History ==
King Eystein Magnusson is said to have built mountain lodges along the road through the Dovrefjell mountains. Legend has it that there was also a church built in the area of today's village of Hjerkinn. Archaeological records support the idea that the church was likely built during the 11th or 12th century and it likely fell out of use sometime around the year 1500. All of this was the inspiration for the 20th-century Eysteinkyrkja. During the 1930s, discussions began for building a chapel along the old road through the Dovrefjell mountains near the Hjerkinn mountain lodge. The local priest in Dovre and the Bishop Kristian Schjelderup supported the idea. Magnus Poulsson was hired to design the new church (although he died before its completion and his son Anton Poulsson finished the work). The new modern-looking concrete church was completed in 1969. The building was consecrated on 3 August 1969. The nave is almost trapezoidal in shape, although it is a long church, with the exterior walls angled towards each other as they get closer to the chancel.

== Media gallery ==
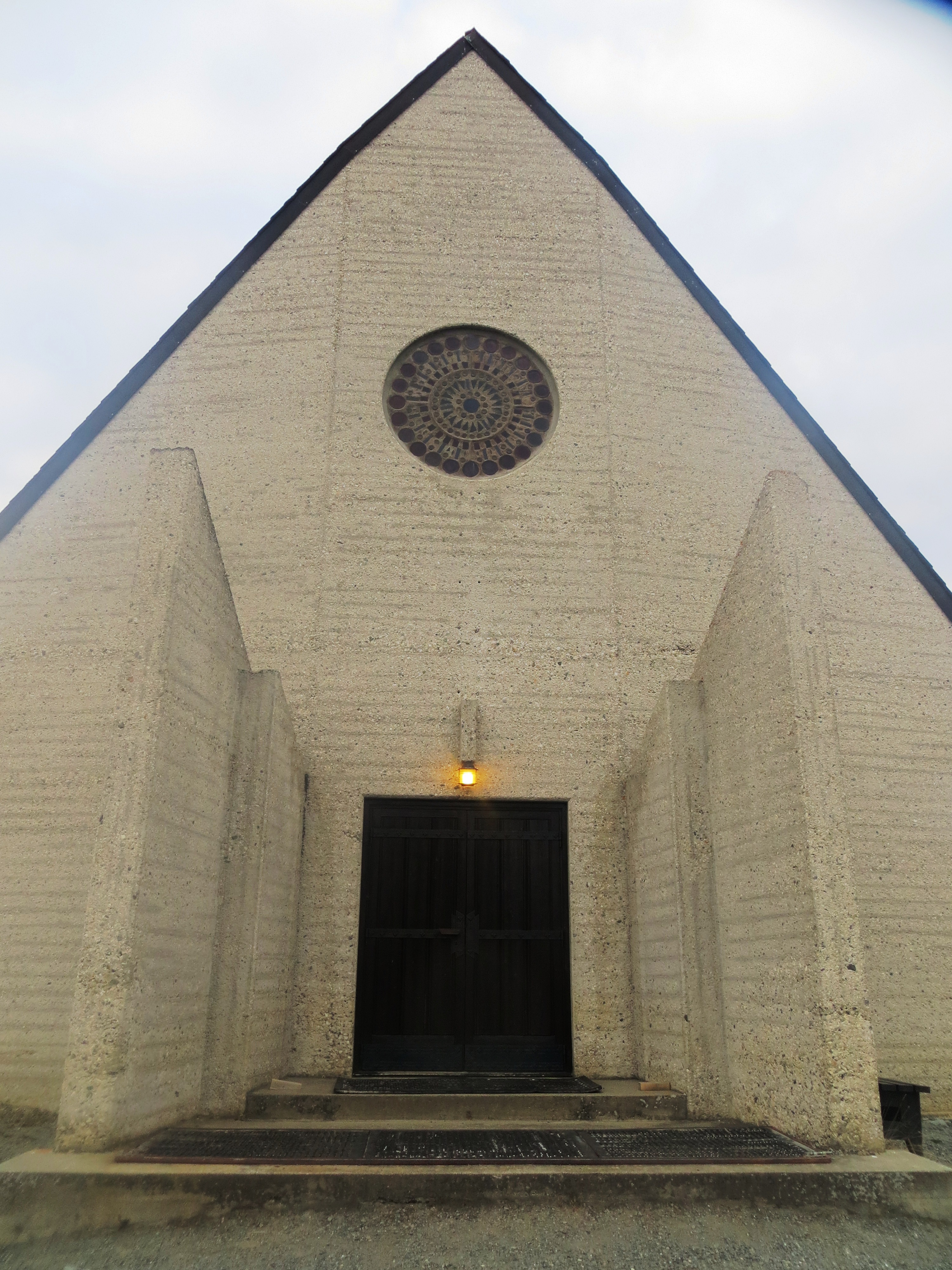

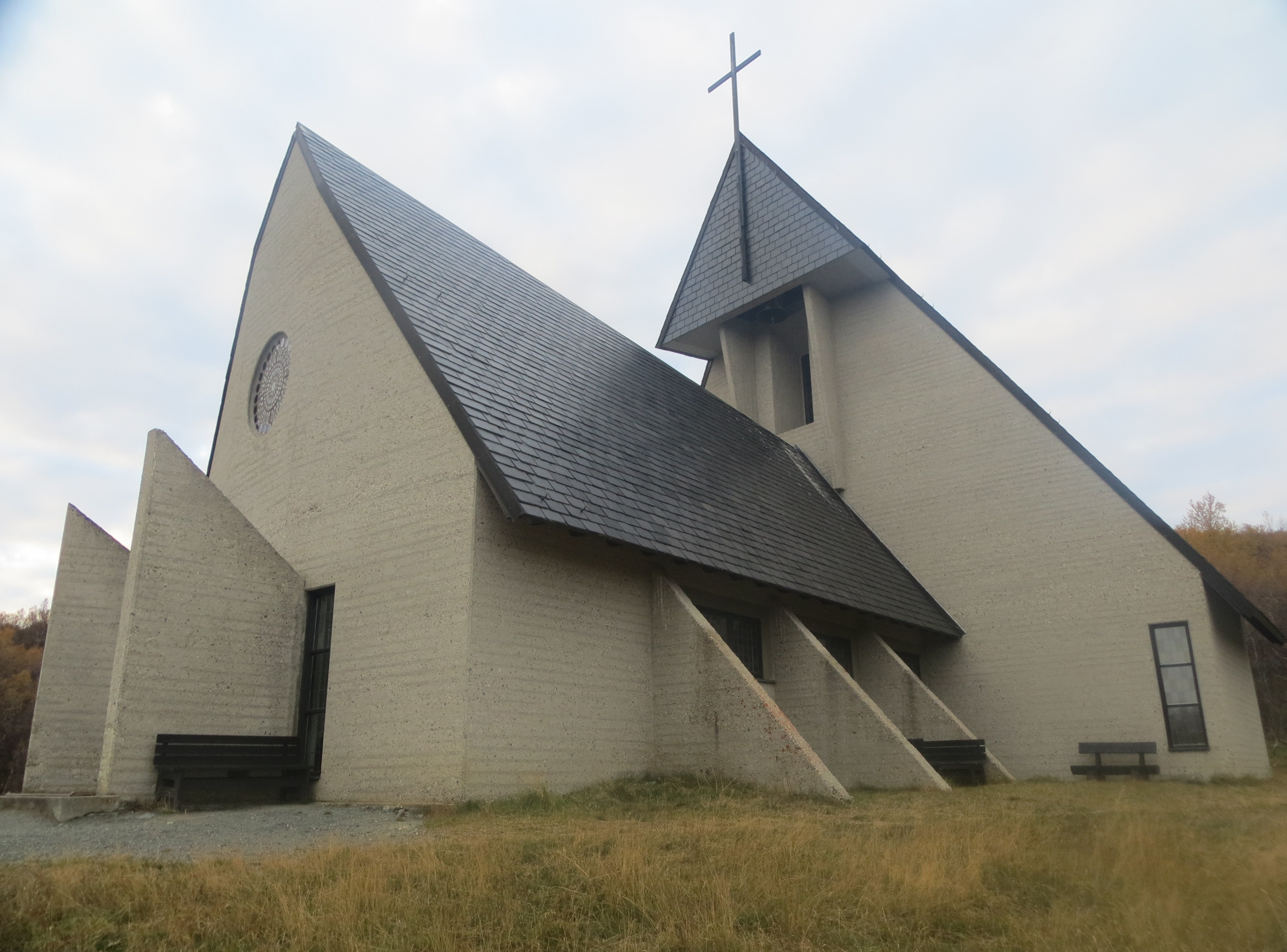

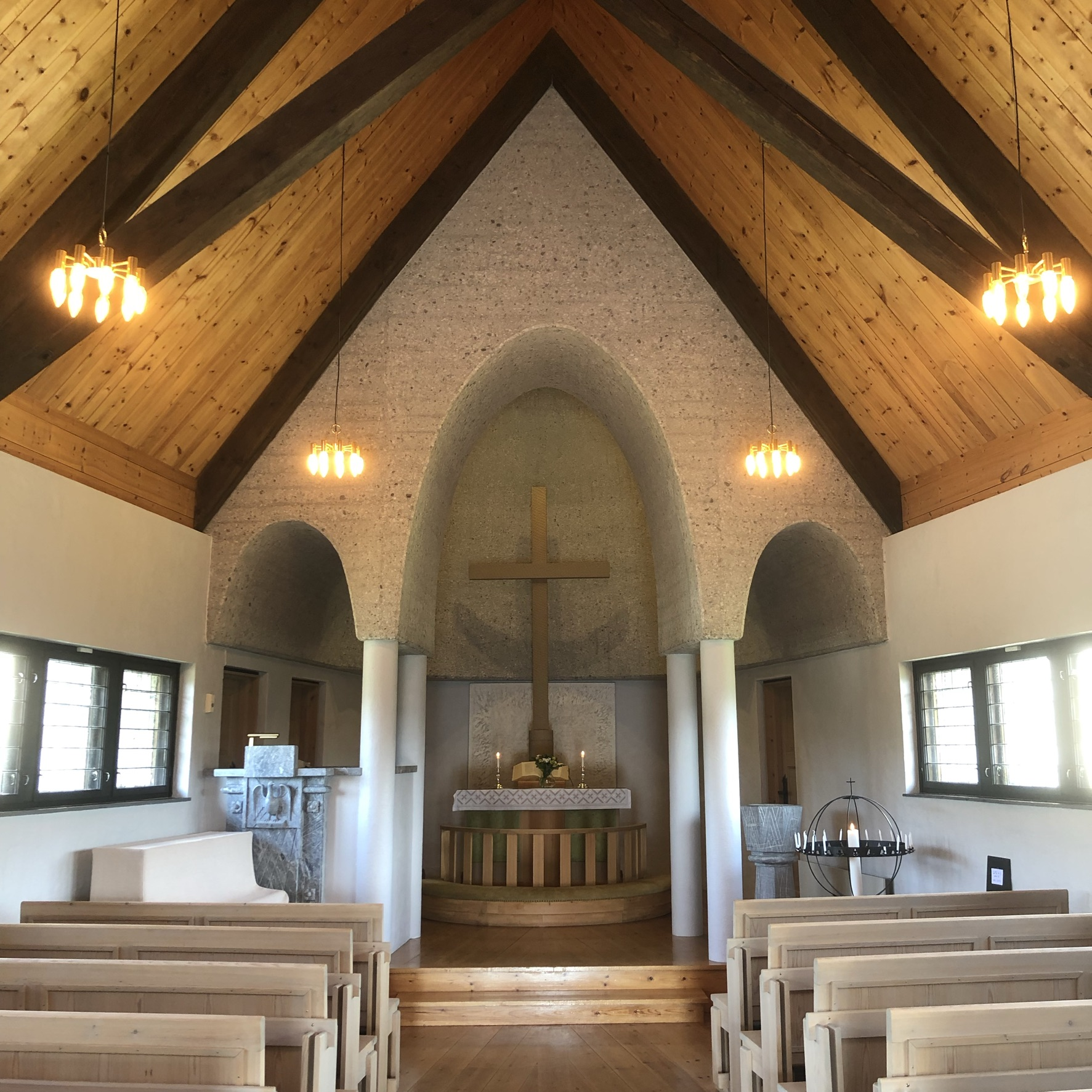

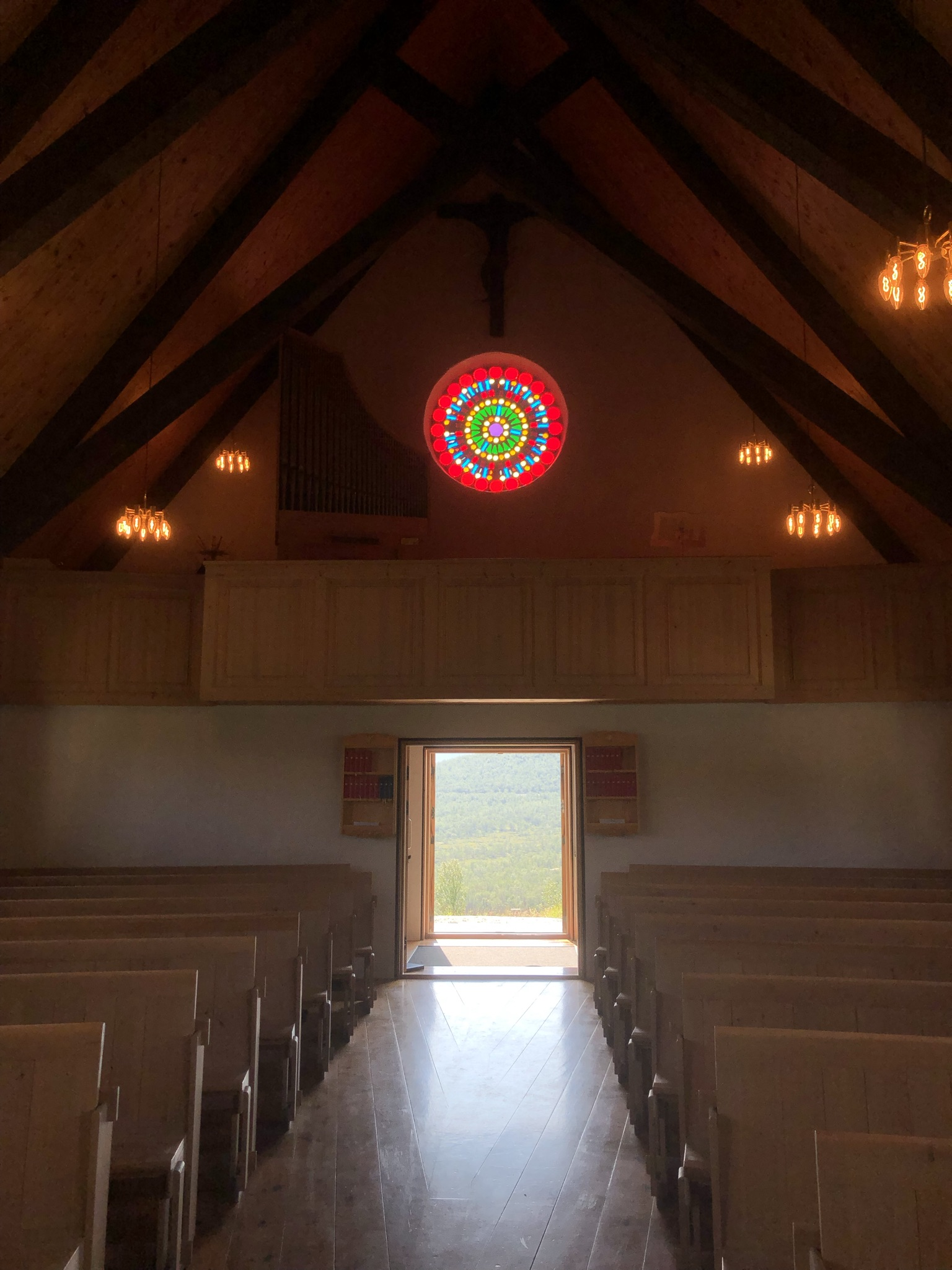

== See also ==
- List of churches in Hamar
