= Fokstumyra Nature Reserve =

Protected area in Norway

- IUCN category Ia (strict nature reserve)
- Interactive map of Fokstumyra Nature Reserve
- Coordinates: 62.1188°N 9.2658°E

Ramsar Wetland
- Official name: Fokstumyra
- Designated: 6 August 2002
- Reference no.: 1189

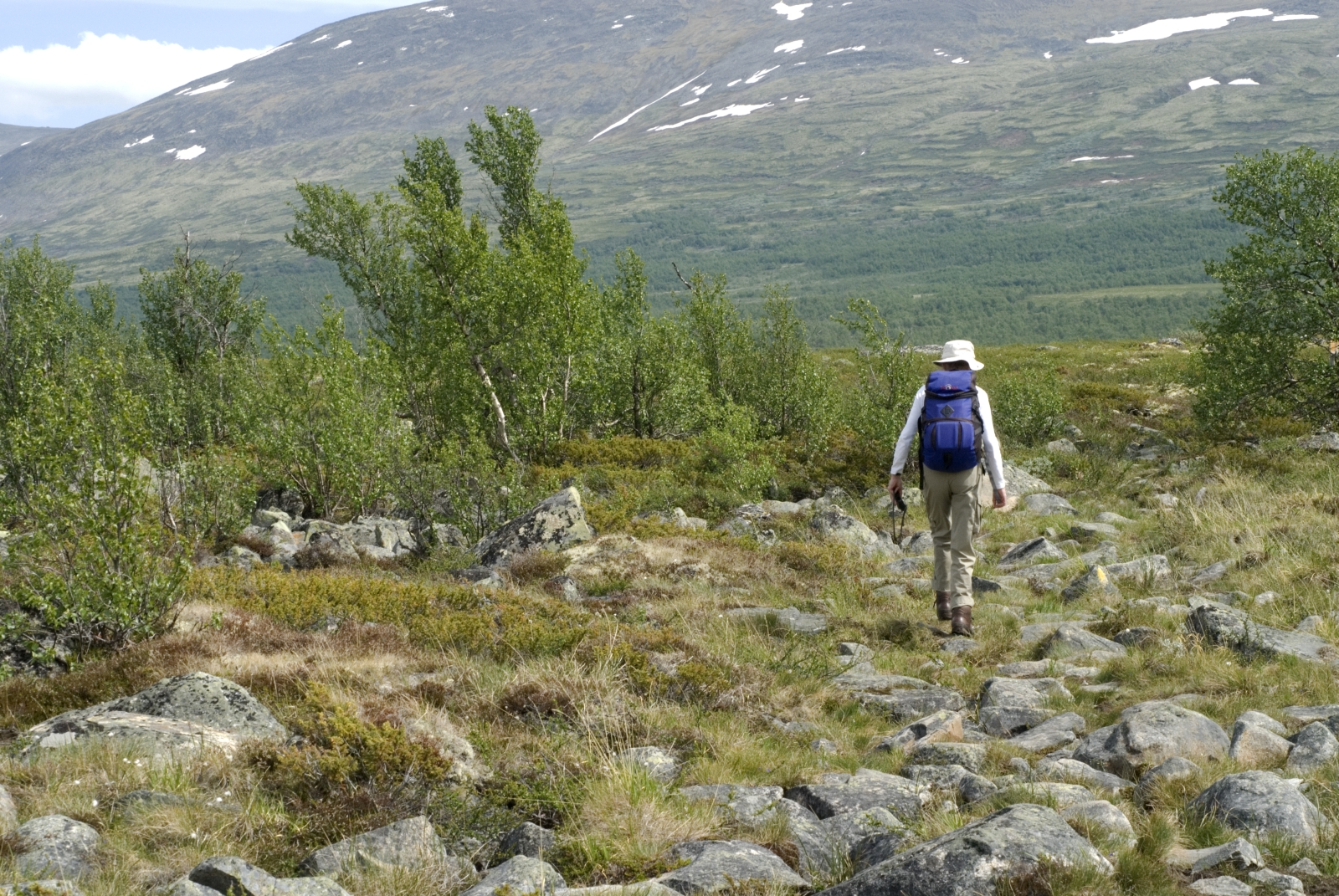

Fokstumyra Nature Reserve is a nature reserve established in 1923 in the Dovrefjell mountains of Dovre Municipality, Norway. It covers an area of 8 square kilometres (3.1 sq mi) of wetlands, and was the first nature reserve in Norway. The area is known for its rich bird fauna and plant diversity. It became a Ramsar site in 2002.
