= Vegard Vigerust =

Norwegian writer (1925–2020)

- Born: 18 November 1925; Dovre Municipality, Norway
- Died: 27 May 2020 (aged 94); Asker Municipality, Norway
- Occupations: Novelist and poet

Vegard Vigerust (18 November 1925 – 27 May 2020) was a Norwegian novelist and poet. He was born in Dovre Municipality. He made his literary debut in 1954 with the satirical novel Stålstuten. Further books include the novels Guten som ville kjøpe Norsk rikskringkasting from 1957, Sæval (1966), and Mikla (1970), and the poetry collections Istid from 1972, Jord (1975), Skimt (1978), and Strender (1982). His novel Stålstuten was basis for a play which was staged at Det Norske Teatret. He contributed with lyrics to the albums Syng Dovre (1998) and Troillspel (2001) by the band Østenfor Sol.

In his treatment of Norwegian literature after World War II, Øystein Rottem mentions Vigerust along with other satirical and critical writers from the 1950s, such as Ragnar Kvam, Gunnar Hagen Hartvedt, and Odd Winger.

Vigerust died in Asker Municipality on 27 May 2020, at the age of 94.
