= Ragnar Solberg =

Norwegian poet

- Born: 30 September 1898; Dovre Municipality, Norway
- Died: 9 December 1967 (aged 69)
- Occupation: Poet

Ragnar Solberg (30 September 1898 – 9 December 1967) was a Norwegian poet. He was born in Dovre Municipality. He made his literary debut in 1937 with the poetry collection Is-gud, written in Dovre dialect. Among his other collections are Du fjell from 1938, Livs-skurd from 1950, and Ljos from 1953.

Solberg was running the mountain cabin at Fokstua in the Dovrefjell mountains, located by the Dovre Line and close to the Fokstumyra Nature Reserve.
