= Dombås =

Village in Dovre Municipality, Norway

- Village
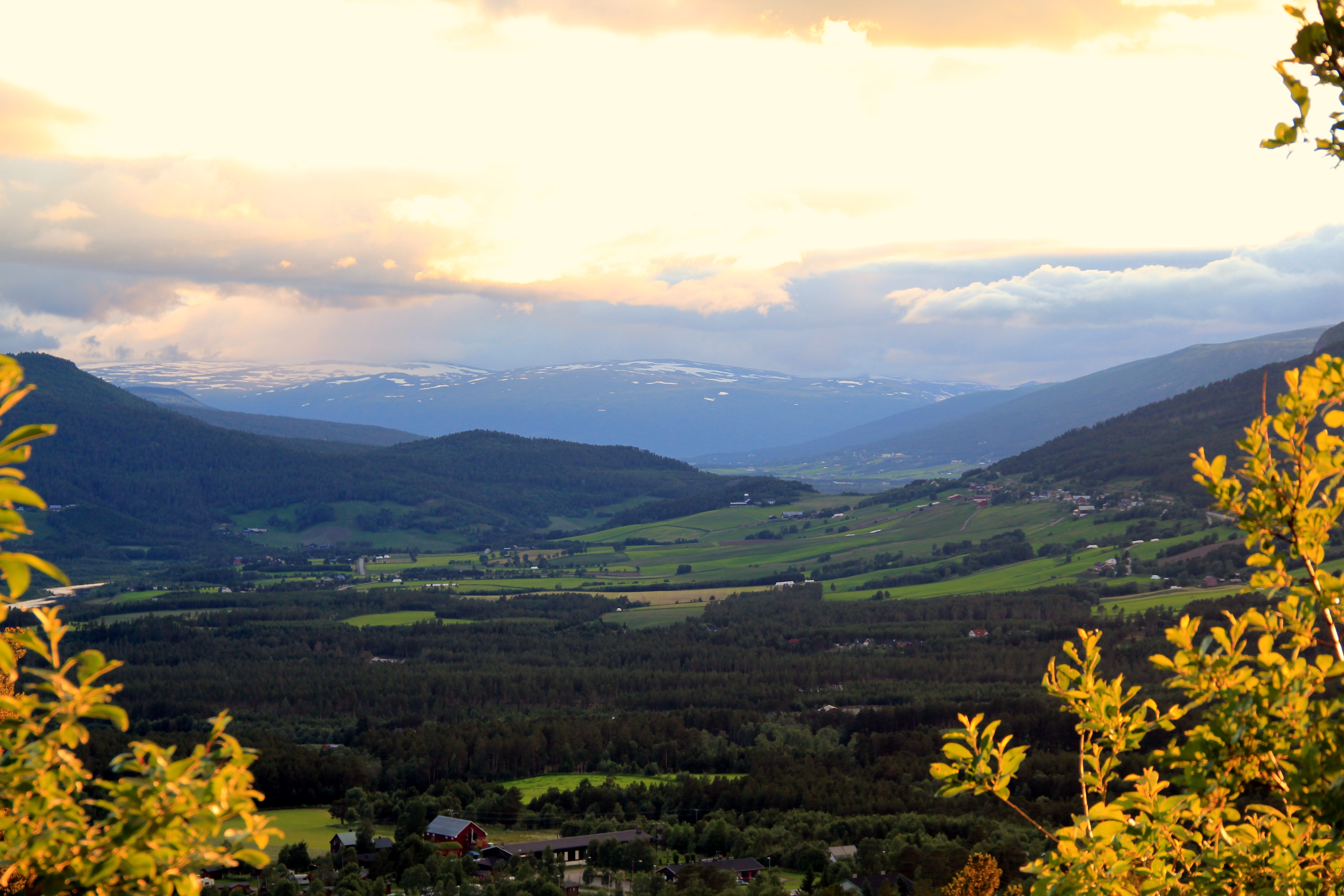
- View of Dombås in the upper Gudbrandsdalen valley.
- Interactive map of Dombås
- Location within Innlandet Location within Norway
- Coordinates: 62.07554°N 9.12785°E
- Country: Norway
- Region: Eastern Norway
- County: Innlandet
- District: Gudbrandsdalen
- Municipality: Dovre Municipality

Area
  - Total: 1.57 km^{2} (0.61 sq mi)
- Elevation: 643 m (2,110 ft)

Population (2024)
  - Total: 1,163
  - Density: 741/km^{2} (1,920/sq mi)
- Time zone: UTC+01:00 (CET)
  - Summer (DST): UTC+02:00 (CEST)
- Post Code: 2660 Dombås

Dombås is a village in Dovre Municipality in northern Innlandet county, Norway. The village serves as the commercial centre for the upper Gudbrandsdalen valley. It lies at an important junction of roads with the European route E6 highway heading north and south connecting the cities of Oslo and Trondheim and the European route E136 highway heading west to Åndalsnes. The Dovrebanen and Raumabanen railway lines meet in the village at Dombås Station as well. Dombås Church is located in the village.

The 1.57-square-kilometre (390-acre) village has a population (2024) of 1163 and a population density of 741 inhabitants per square kilometre (1,920/sq mi).

== History ==
=== 19th century ===
A description of the village area from 1895:

At Dombås, where there is a telegraph station, the scene had entirely changed, and fields of waving barley and potatoes greeted the eye.... Here, at a height of 2,000 feet (610 m) above the sea, the crops were not quite ripe, the season being backward. Barley required a few more days of sunshine, and the potatoes were still in bloom. The evenings became cold, and the farmers' faces showed their anxiety. The wind was from the NNW, and for two consecutive nights black frost appeared. The potato-vines turned black, and the grain crop was seriously injured. After the first frost everybody was at work in the fields, women and men sheaving the barley, and every available hand digging the potatoes. There was sorrow in many a farmer's heart, for the people were now greatly distressed, and I detected tears on many a mother's cheek during these two days. After this sudden cold spell the weather became cloudy, a violent storm set in, and the ground was covered with 18 inches (460 mm) of wet snow, though it was only the 20th of September.

— Paul B. Du Chaillu from The Land Of The Midnight Sun

=== Twentieth century ===
The Dovre Line was extended to Dombås in 1913 and Dombås Station was built. The line was extended onwards to Støren in 1921. Three years later, the Rauma Line opened connecting Dombås to Åndalsnes. Dombås Church was completed in 1939.

==== World War II ====
In 1940, during the Norwegian Campaign, the Germans recognized that this rail, roadway and telegraph junction was strategically significant. From 13 April on the Germans started receiving messages of imminent allied action in Norway through the port of Åndalsnes. To counter this, the German High Command ordered a takeover of Dombås. The result was that a company of fallschirmjägers from the 1st battalion of the 1st Regiment, 7th Flieger Division was dropped at Dombås on 14 April, intending to cut the rail line. The German company had the misfortune to jump straight onto the second battalion of Infantry Regiment no. 11 (Møre) that was bivouacked at Dombås on their way to the front north of Oslo. In the second opposed paratrooper attack in history (the first being the one made against Sola Air Station on 9 April) only seven out of fifteen Junkers Ju 52s made it back to their base at Fornebu airport the rest were lost to Norwegian Colt M/29 anti-aircraft machine gun fire, dispersing the paratroopers. Most of the surviving paratroopers were taken prisoner soon after landing. Only a single group of sixty-three Germans, under the company commander Oberleutnant Herbert Schmidt, managed to avoid capture and sealed off the Gudbrandsdalen valley holed up in two strategically placed farms. Only on 19 April did the isolated group of Germans surrender, having been surrounded by far superior Norwegian forces for five days. On 16 April, the Norwegians brought two mortars and several Colt M/29 heavy machine guns to bear on Schmidt's men and from 18 April a 40 mm Bofors anti-aircraft gun bombarded the German positions from Dombås Railway Station. On 19 April the paratroopers could no longer stand the bombardment and sent forward the captured Norwegian Major Kjøs to convey their surrender message. All in all 150 fallschirmjägers ended up in Norwegian captivity, being kept in a prisoner-of-war camp near Kristiansund until released when resistance collapsed in South Norway in early May.

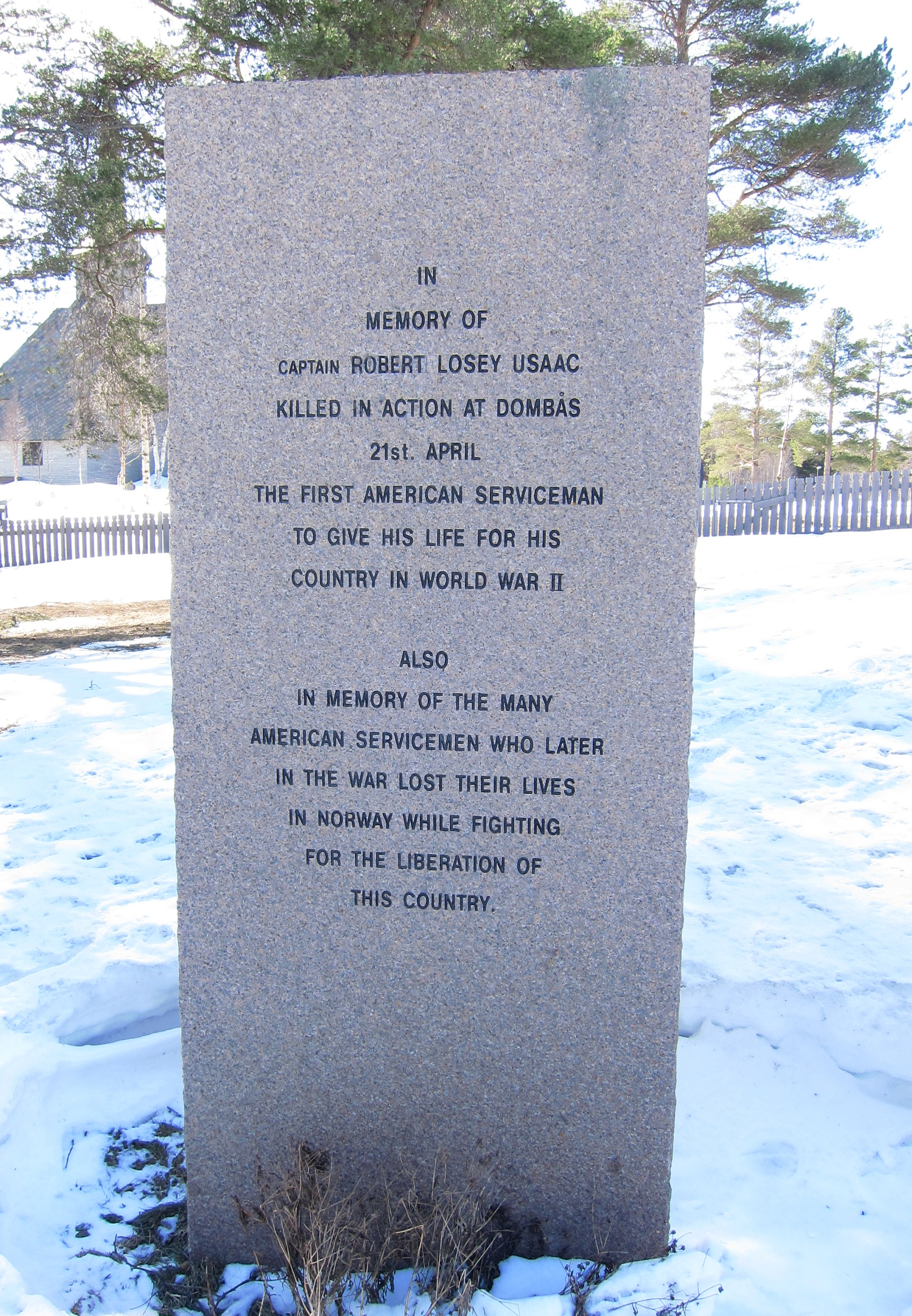
Memorial to Captain Robert M. Losey

On 21 April 1940, a German Luftwaffe bombing attack on the village's railway areas resulted in the first American military casualty of World War II. Captain Robert M. Losey, an aeronautical meteorologist serving as an air attaché to American embassies in the Nordic countries, was killed while observing the bombing near the entrance to a rail tunnel where he and others had sought safety. A monument to Captain Losey now stands in Dombås. Five Norwegians were killed by the same bomb as Losey, and another 18 were wounded.

Also in April 1940, after evacuating Oslo after the German invasion of Norway, King Haakon VII first travelled with his government to Elverum, but after that city and Nybergsund was bombed by the Luftwaffe the decision was made to move to Gudbrandsdal where the Army High Command had relocated. The King's entourage at first got lost and ended up at Drevsø on the Swedish border where they were turned back by Swedish border guards. The King then went first to Hjerkinn and then to Otta. On his way to Otta the King passed through Dombås on 13 April 1940, only five hours before the German paratrooper attack took place. On 14 April, the King and the Crown Prince remained at Otta, transmitting radio messages to their people. As the German attack came the Fallschirmjäger were landing dispersed over a huge area and the royal family decided to spend the night at Dovre, only half an hour from the nearest Germans. Although the Fallschirmjägers never got any nearer the King, who was protected by the local Dovreskogen gun club, they did ambush the cabinet minister Frihagen, capturing his car and a suitcase with 1.5 million kr. Minister Frihagen managed to escape the ambush and the money was recovered when Oberleutnant Schmidt surrendered on 19 April. The King eventually made his way to Molde from where he was brought to Tromsø by HMS Glasgow.

During the German occupation of Norway, Dombås and Oppdal were the locations of the Stalag 380 prisoner-of-war camp, relocated in late 1942 from Skarżysko-Kamienna in German-occupied Poland.

== Climate ==
Dombås has a boreal climate with modest precipitation. Summer is the wettest season; late winter and spring are the driest seasons.

Climate data for Dombås - Nordigard, Norway (638 m, 2006-2023)
Month	Jan	Feb	Mar	Apr	May	Jun	Jul	Aug	Sep	Oct	Nov	Dec	Year
Record high °C (°F)	10.2 (50.4)	10.7 (51.3)	15.3 (59.5)	18.9 (66.0)	26.4 (79.5)	28.0 (82.4)	29.6 (85.3)	25.2 (77.4)	23.5 (74.3)	17.8 (64.0)	13.5 (56.3)	10.6 (51.1)	29.6 (85.3)
Mean daily maximum °C (°F)	−3.6 (25.5)	−2.0 (28.4)	2.3 (36.1)	6.7 (44.1)	11.8 (53.2)	16.9 (62.4)	18.7 (65.7)	16.7 (62.1)	12.8 (55.0)	5.8 (42.4)	0.4 (32.7)	−3.0 (26.6)	6.9 (44.4)
Daily mean °C (°F)	−6.9 (19.6)	−5.7 (21.7)	−2.2 (28.0)	1.9 (35.4)	6.8 (44.2)	11.3 (52.3)	13.4 (56.1)	11.8 (53.2)	8.3 (46.9)	2.4 (36.3)	−2.5 (27.5)	−6.2 (20.8)	2.7 (36.8)
Mean daily minimum °C (°F)	−10.0 (14.0)	−8.8 (16.2)	−5.8 (21.6)	−2.3 (27.9)	2.2 (36.0)	6.5 (43.7)	9.0 (48.2)	7.9 (46.2)	4.8 (40.6)	−0.2 (31.6)	−5.0 (23.0)	−9.2 (15.4)	−0.9 (30.4)
Record low °C (°F)	−29.5 (−21.1)	−25.8 (−14.4)	−26.5 (−15.7)	−16.4 (2.5)	−6.9 (19.6)	−1.9 (28.6)	0.0 (32.0)	−1.3 (29.7)	−3.9 (25.0)	−13.7 (7.3)	−23.4 (−10.1)	−26.3 (−15.3)	−29.5 (−21.1)
Average precipitation mm (inches)	40.8 (1.61)	23.3 (0.92)	21.2 (0.83)	20.1 (0.79)	31.8 (1.25)	46.4 (1.83)	68.3 (2.69)	69.9 (2.75)	32.5 (1.28)	30.7 (1.21)	33.3 (1.31)	32.5 (1.28)	450.8 (17.75)
Average precipitation days (≥ 1.0 mm)	10.0	6.6	6.4	4.7	6.0	7.9	11.9	12.3	6.4	7.2	7.9	9.3	96.6
Source: Norwegian Meteorological Institute

== Media ==
The newspaper Vigga is published in Dombås.

== Notable people ==
- Sigurd Einbu (1866–1946), a self-taught astronomer, ran a magnetic monitoring station at Dombås from 1916
- Ragnar Solberg (1898–1967), a poet who lived in Fokstua
- Eli Hagen (born 1947 in Dombås), a TV presenter and personality, wife of Carl Ivar Hagen
- Lars Berger (born 1979) and Tora Berger (born 1981), retired cross-country skiers
- Marcus Kleveland (born 1999), a snowboarder

== See also ==
- Dombås Station
