= Hjerkinn =

Village in Dovre, Norway

- Village
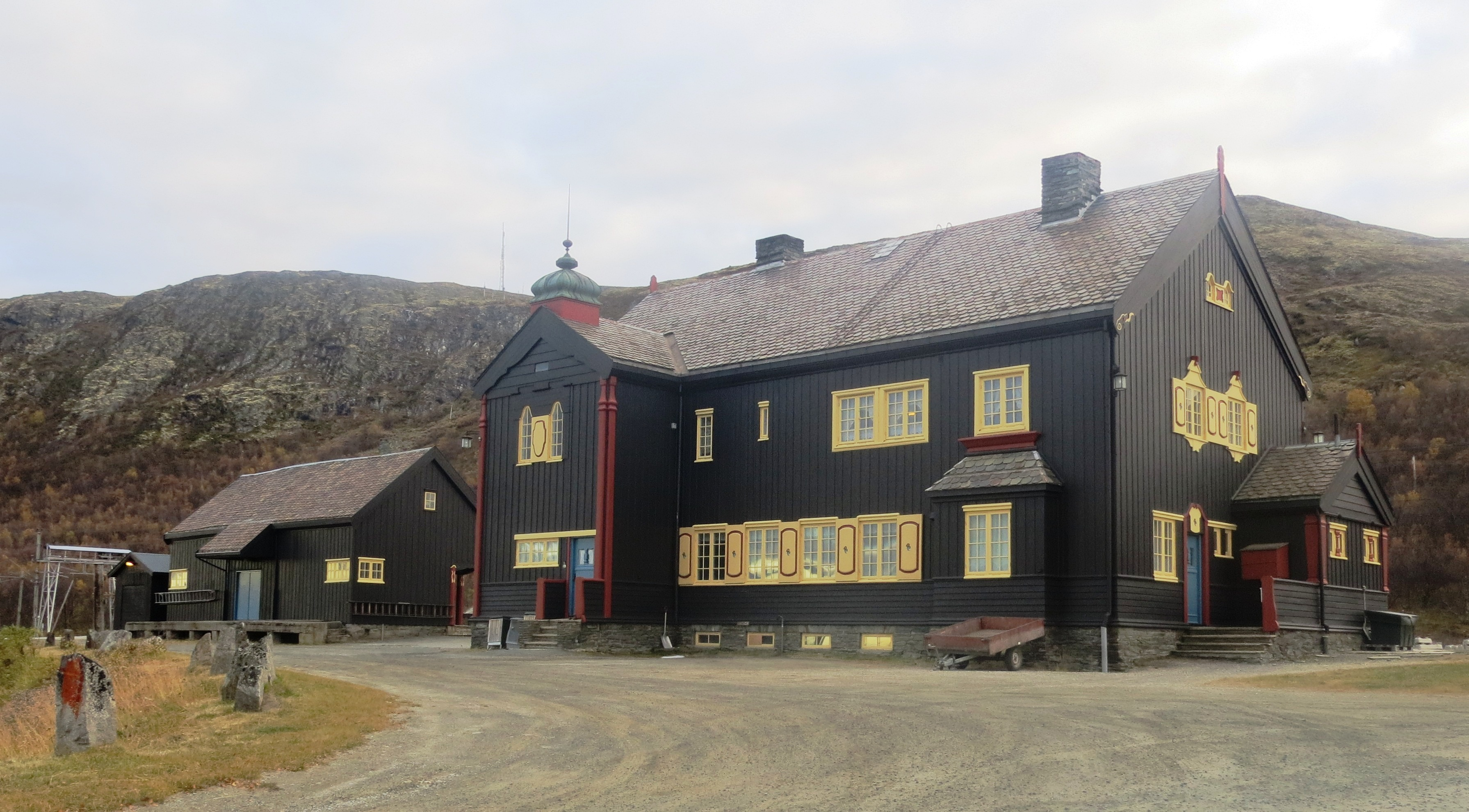
- View of the village railway station
- Interactive map of Hjerkinn
- Coordinates: 62.22347°N 9.54746°E
- Country: Norway
- Region: Eastern Norway
- County: Innlandet
- District: Gudbrandsdalen
- Municipality: Dovre Municipality
- Elevation: 990 m (3,250 ft)
- Time zone: UTC+01:00 (CET)
  - Summer (DST): UTC+02:00 (CEST)
- Post Code: 2661 Hjerkinn

Hjerkinn is a village in Dovre Municipality in Innlandet county in Norway. The village is located in the Dovrefjell mountains, about 30 kilometres (19 mi) northeast of the village of Dombås and about 25 kilometres (16 mi) northwest of the village of Folldal.

It is one of the driest places in the country, with only 222 millimetres (8.7 in) annual precipitation in the 10-year period 1905-14.

The railway station Hjerkinn Station is located on the Dovre Line, at an elevation of 1,017 metres (3,337 ft) above mean sea level. The European route E6 highway also passes through the village. Until 1993 there was mining in the village by Folldal Gruver. The Norwegian military also has a camp at Hjerkinn. Eystein Church is also located in the village, along the historic pilgrim's route to Nidaros Cathedral.

== Name ==
The village is named Hjerkinn (Old Norse: Hjarðkinn). The first element is probably the stem form of hjǫrðr which means "herd" or "flock" of cattle or sheep. The last element is kinn which means "steep mountainside". The village of Hjerkinn is lying beneath steep mountainsides, and since this place was an important crossroads with roads to Oppdal and Folldal herds were often driven through this area.

== Climate ==
Climate data for Hjerkinn, Hjerkinn II (1012 m, precipitation 2010-, extremes 1891-1914, 2010-)
Month	Jan	Feb	Mar	Apr	May	Jun	Jul	Aug	Sep	Oct	Nov	Dec	Year
Record high °C (°F)	6.5 (43.7)	8.1 (46.6)	9.5 (49.1)	15.5 (59.9)	24.4 (75.9)	25.2 (77.4)	26.6 (79.9)	22.9 (73.2)	22.0 (71.6)	18.7 (65.7)	10.8 (51.4)	10.3 (50.5)	26.6 (79.9)
Daily mean °C (°F)	−6.8 (19.8)	−7.2 (19.0)	−5.2 (22.6)	−1.0 (30.2)	3.6 (38.5)	8.0 (46.4)	10.8 (51.4)	9.7 (49.5)	5.7 (42.3)	0.1 (32.2)	−4.0 (24.8)	−6.4 (20.5)	0.6 (33.1)
Record low °C (°F)	−29.1 (−20.4)	−29.1 (−20.4)	−26.5 (−15.7)	−20.1 (−4.2)	−14.1 (6.6)	−5.6 (21.9)	−2.6 (27.3)	−4.1 (24.6)	−7.4 (18.7)	−17.0 (1.4)	−25.5 (−13.9)	−27.7 (−17.9)	−29.1 (−20.4)
Average precipitation mm (inches)	40 (1.6)	34 (1.3)	39 (1.5)	27 (1.1)	35 (1.4)	51 (2.0)	70 (2.8)	62 (2.4)	36 (1.4)	43 (1.7)	41 (1.6)	38 (1.5)	516 (20.3)
Source: yr.no/Norwegian Meteorological Institute
