= Dovre Municipality =

Municipality in Innlandet, Norway

Dovre Municipality Dovre kommune
- Municipality
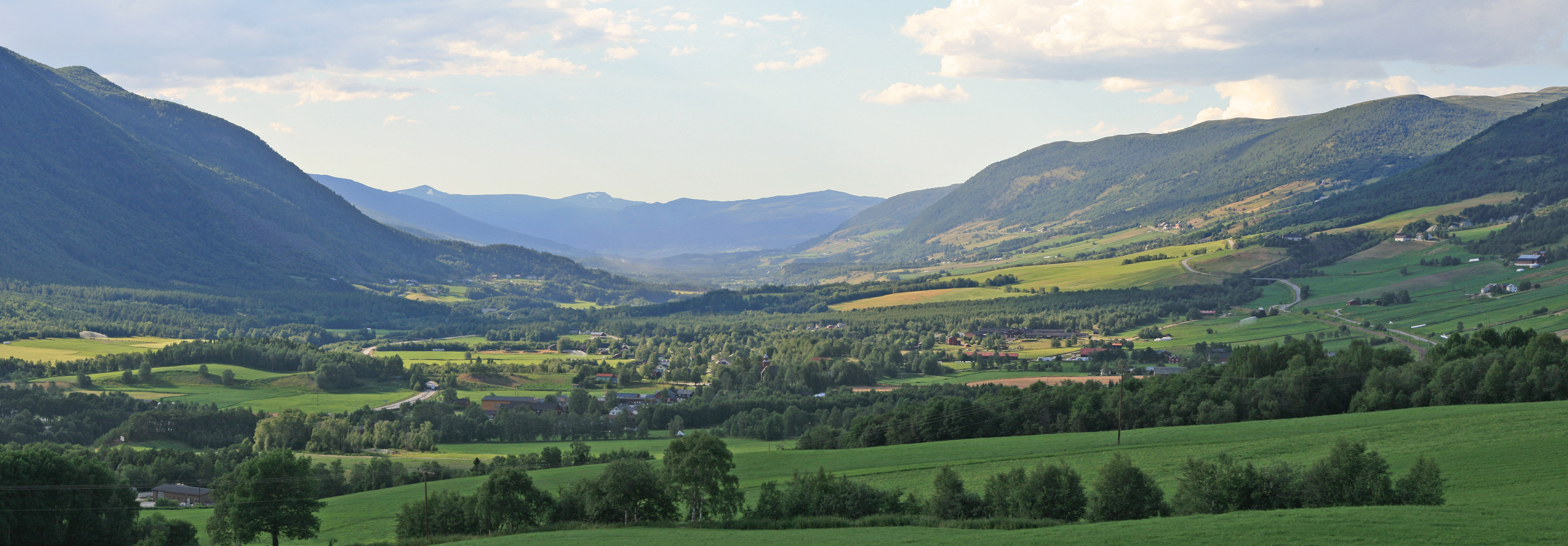
- View of the Dovre area

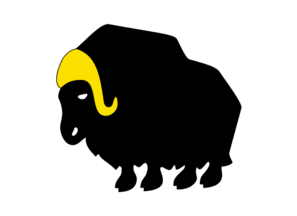
- Flag Coat of arms

- Innlandet within Norway

- Dovre within Innlandet
- Coordinates: 62°2′6″N 9°28′3″E
- Country: Norway
- County: Innlandet
- District: Gudbrandsdalen
- Established: 1861
  - Preceded by: Lesja Municipality
- Administrative centre: Dovre

Government
  - Mayor (2023): Magne Vorkinn ((Sp))

Area
  - Total: 1,364.38 km^{2} (526.79 sq mi)
  - Land: 1,349.19 km^{2} (520.93 sq mi)
  - Water: 15.19 km^{2} (5.86 sq mi) 1.1%
  - Rank: #69 in Norway
- Highest elevation: 2,287.1 m (7,504 ft)

Population (2025)
  - Total: 2,516
  - Rank: #252 in Norway
  - Density: 1.8/km^{2} (4.7/sq mi)
  - Change (10 years): ▼ −7.4%
- Demonym: Dovring

Official language
  - Norwegian form: Neutral
- Time zone: UTC+01:00 (CET)
  - Summer (DST): UTC+02:00 (CEST)
- ISO 3166 code: NO-3431
- Website: Official website

Dovre is a municipality in Innlandet county, Norway. It is located in the traditional district of Gudbrandsdal. The administrative centre of the municipality is the village of Dovre. Other villages in Dovre include Dombås and Hjerkinn.

The 1,364.38-square-kilometre (526.79 sq mi) municipality is the 69th largest by area out of the 357 municipalities in Norway. Dovre Municipality is the 252nd most populous municipality in Norway with a population of 2,516. The municipality's population density is 1.8 inhabitants per square kilometre (4.7/sq mi) and its population has decreased by 7.4% over the previous 10-year period.

== General information ==
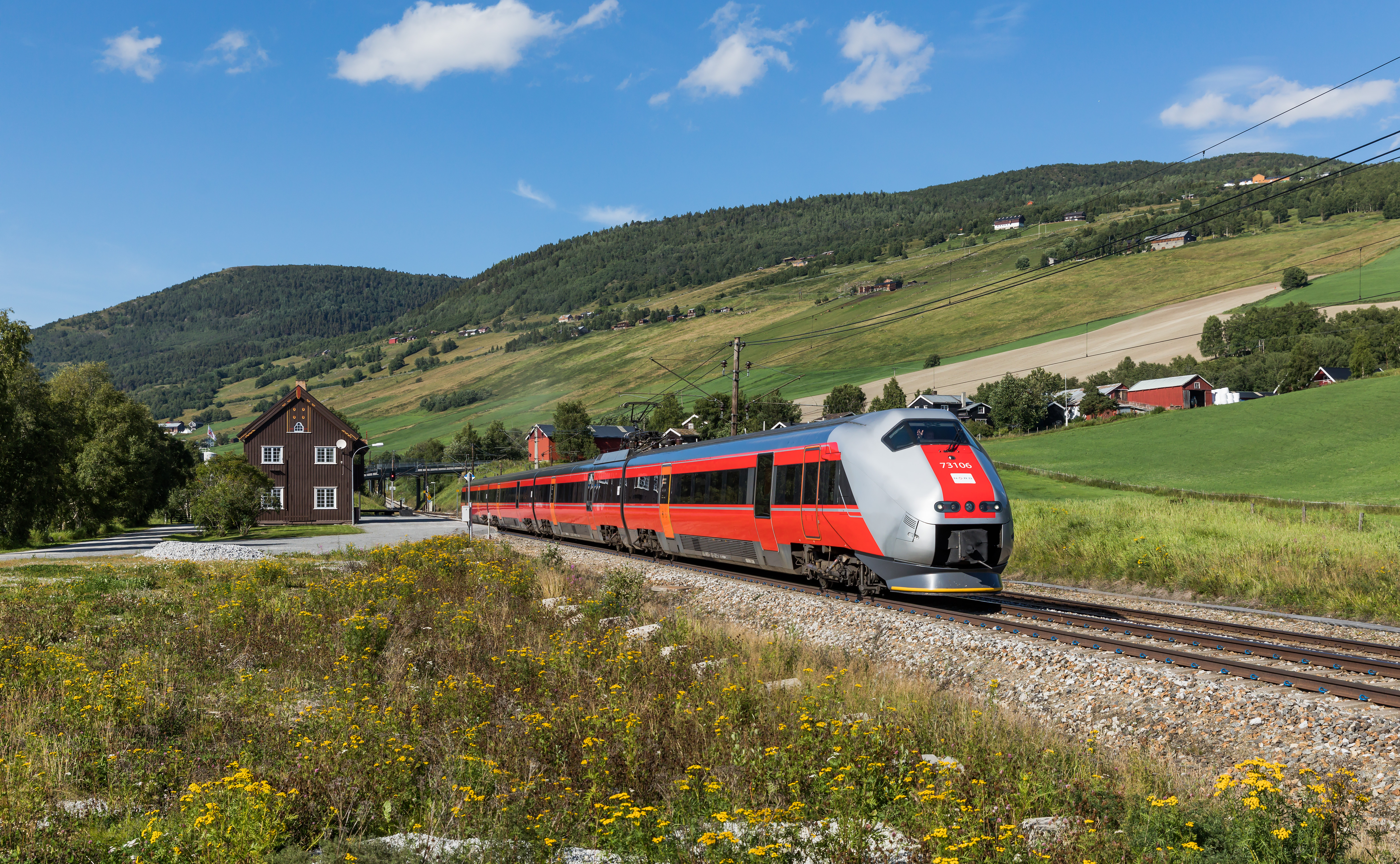
View of the Dovrebanen railroad passing the Dovre Station

The municipality of Dovre was established in 1861 when it was separated from the large Lesja Municipality. Initially, the new municipality had 2,537 residents. On 1 January 1970, the three western farms at Bergsengseter (population: 11) were transferred from Dovre Municipality to the neighboring Folldal Municipality.

Historically, the municipality was part of the old Oppland county. On 1 January 2020, the municipality became a part of the newly-formed Innlandet county (after Hedmark and Oppland counties were merged).

=== Name ===
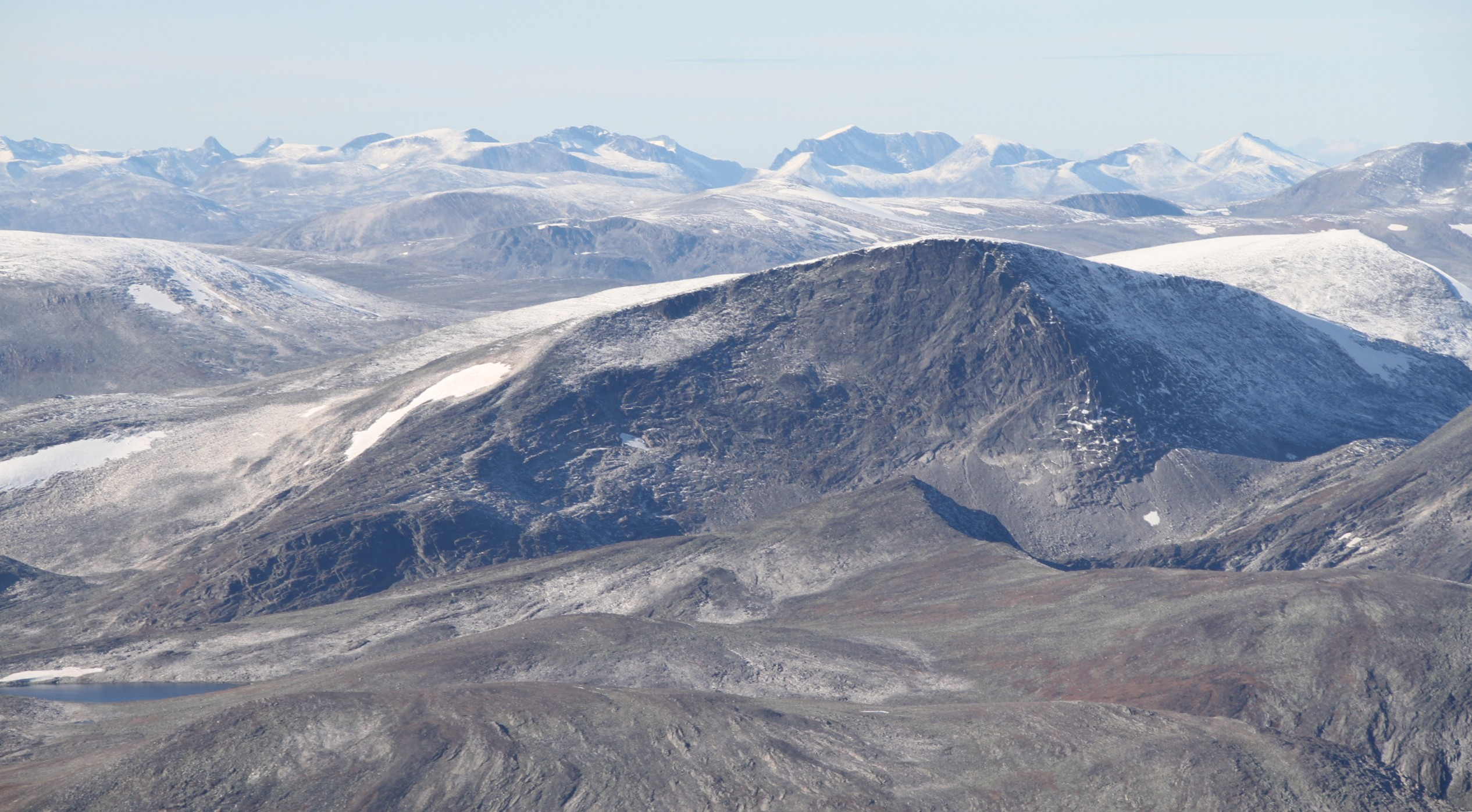
Dovrefjell mountains

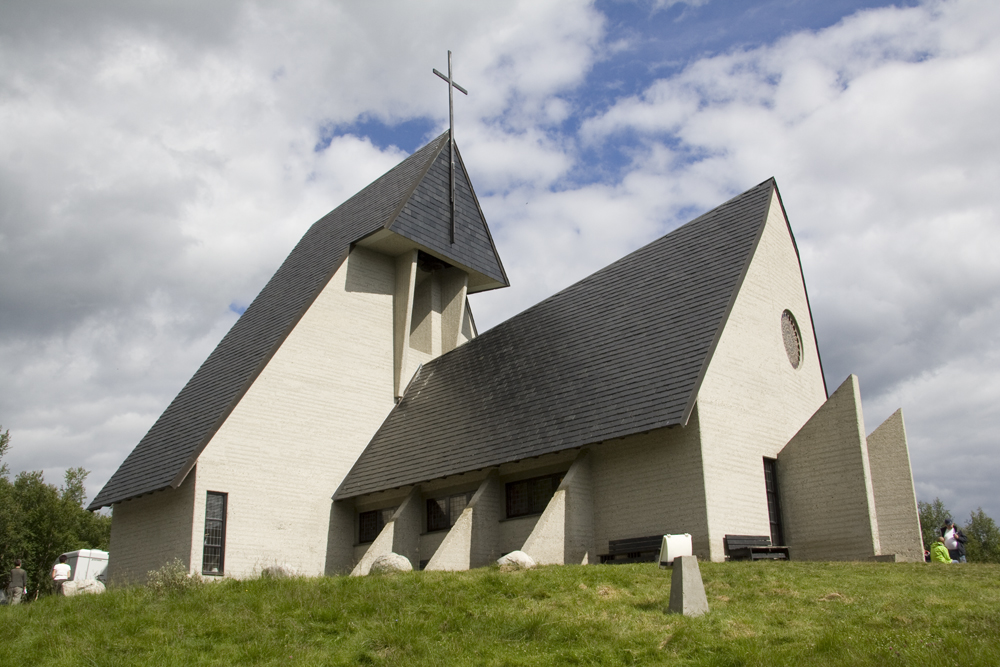
Eystein Church (Eysteinskirka) in Dovre

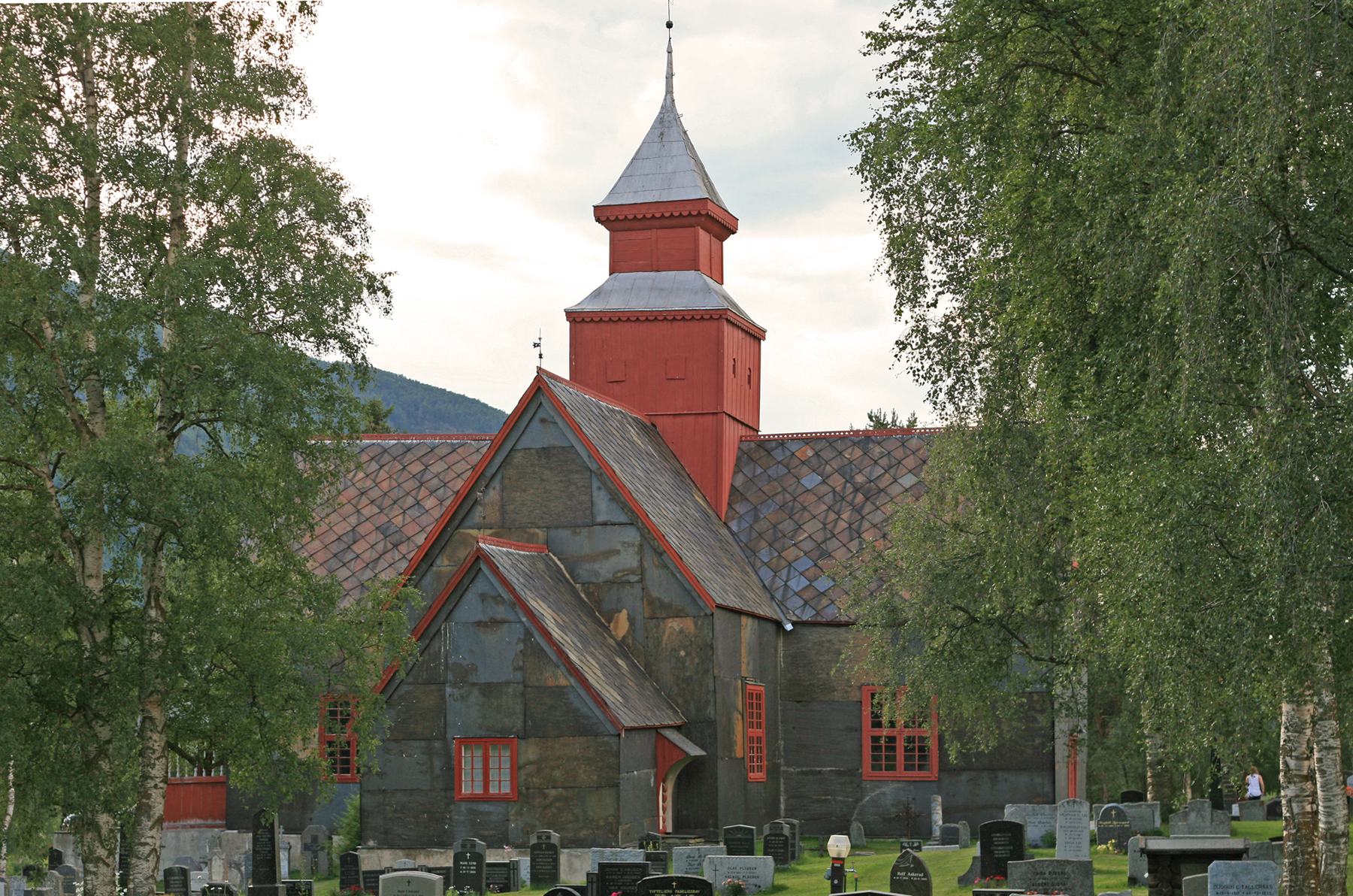
Dovre Church

The municipality (originally the parish) is named after the old Dovre farm (Old Norse: Dofrar) since the first Dovre Church was built there. The name belongs to a group of Scandinavian toponyms that the Swedish linguist Elof Hellquist has derived from a Proto-Norse *đuƀra-, and linguists have further derived them from the old Proto-Indo-European root *dʰub-/*dʰup- (cf. PIE *dʰubrós, "deep"), a root that is also attested in German Topel ("forested valley") and Old Slavic dublŭ ("hole"). There are several place names in Denmark, Norway and Sweden that are identified as related to Dovre:

Denmark

- Døvregaarde in the narrow valley Døvredal, in Bodilsker parish on Bornholm.
- Dover a place with steep slopes in Lintrup parish in Haderslev amt.
- Dovergaard located among deeply cut banks of a small stream, in Skipdsted parish near Aalborg.
- Dover vestergaard, an old farm name, and the bay Doverkil, with hilly terrain, in Ydby parish, near Thisted.
- Dover sogn a parish in Hjelmslev hundred in Århus amt. It has a hilly terrain with steep slopes.

Norway

- Dovre herred. ON Dofrar was originally the name of an old farm and it later became the name for the entire parish and municipality.
- Dofrar was the name of a lost farm in Biri, but it survives in the name of a local meadow Dåvreænga.
- Døvre, where the name is derived from dofrar and vin ("meadow").

Sweden

- Dovra sjöar ("lakes of Dovra"), which are three lakes (Northern/Upper, Middle, and Southern) in a fissure valley in Närke.
- Ödesdovra, a farm located at the southernmost extension of the valley.
- Dovern, a long and narrow inlet of the lake Glan in Östergötland, and there is a strait named Doversund and a farm named Doverstorp.

The name has also been given to giants in Scandinavian legends. The name has been given to the giant Dofri, at Dovrefjell, who was helped by Harald Fairhair and in return assisted him all his life. In Närke, the Dovra lakes were attributed to the giantess Dovra who wept for her husband.

=== Coat of arms ===
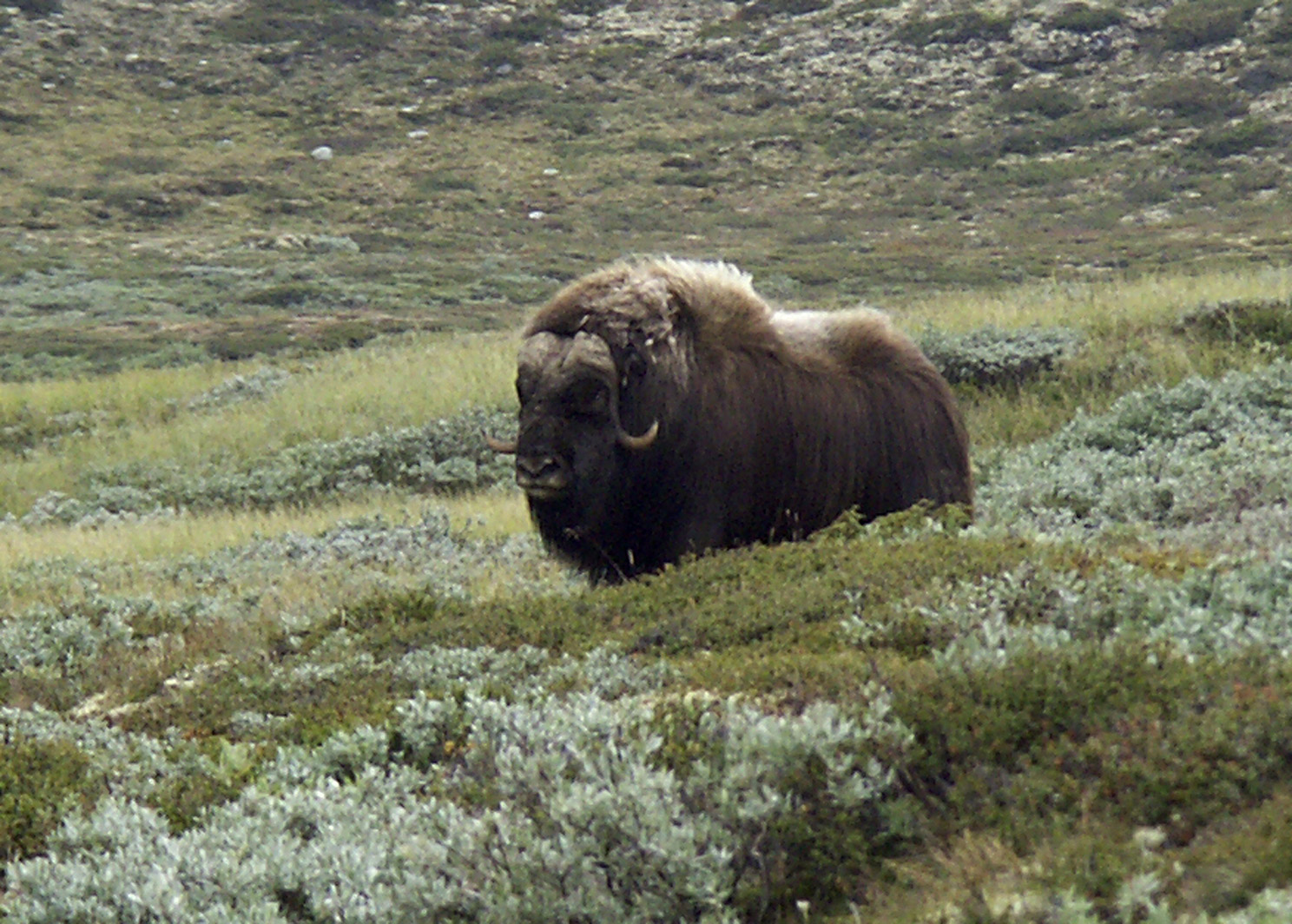
Muskox living in Dovre

The coat of arms was granted on 11 July 1986. The official blazon is "Argent, a muskox sable" (Norwegian: I sølv en svart moskus). This means the arms have a field (background) has a tincture of argent which means it is commonly colored white, but if it is made out of metal, then silver is used. The charge is a muskox that is black with yellow horn. It is displayed statant to dexter. The muskox is an animal typical for the northern parts of Canada, Alaska, and Greenland. It is not native to Norway, but in 1932, ten muskoxen were released near Dovre. The number has increased to around 300 (in 2013), and the animal is thus a typical symbol for the municipality. The arms were designed by Einar Skjervold. The municipal flag has the same design as the coat of arms.

=== Churches ===
The Church of Norway has two parishes (sokn) within Dovre Municipality. It is part of the Nord-Gudbrandsdal prosti (deanery) in the Diocese of Hamar.

Churches in Dovre Municipality
Parish (sokn)	Church name	Location of the church	Year built
Dombås	Dombås Church	Dombås	1939
Dombås	Eystein Church	Hjerkinn	1969
Dovre	Dovre Church	Dovre	1736

Dovre Church (Dovre kirke) was built in 1736. The bell tower was added early in the 19th century. It was built based upon designed by Jesper Mikkelson Rusten. It was constructed of wood and has protected status.

Eystein Church (Eysteinskirka) in Dovre was built in 1969 as a church for pilgrims and travelers on the Pilgrim's Route. The church lies near the juncture of the boundaries of Innlandet and Trøndelag counties. Eystein Church is built of concrete using stone and sand brought from the Hjerkinn. The plans for the church were designed by architect Magnus Poulsson (1881-1958).

== History ==
Number of minorities (1st and 2nd generation) in Dovre by country of origin in 2017
Ancestry	Number
Poland	60
Syria	30
Lithuania	21
Somalia	20
Eritrea	14

People have lived in what is now Dovre Municipality for about 6,000 years. In the Stone Age, they were primarily hunters and fishermen. Approximately 2,000 years ago, the first farms were developed at this location.

Dovre is mentioned in Heimskringla (The Chronicle of the Kings of Norway) by Snorri Sturluson. In 1021, King Olaf laid hold of all the best men, both at Lesja and Dovre, and forced them either to receive Christianity or suffer death, if they were not so lucky as to escape.

The Pilgrim's Route (Old King's Road) between Oslo and Trondheim in the 16th century passed through the Gudbrandsdal valley. After leaving the Lågen river valley (downriver from present day Dombås) the road passed over the Dovrefjell mountains into the present-day municipality of Dovre. The heavy stream of annual pilgrims who visited the shrine of St. Olaf in Trondheim prior to the Protestant Reformation resulted in the construction of mountain stations along the route where the pilgrims could find food and shelter. In speaking of this route, Gjerset quotes Peder Claussøn Friis as writing:

But in the winter people of high estate, as well as members of the court, travel mostly this way, because however high and deep the snow may fall, it blows together on the high mountains and becomes so hard men and horses can walk on it. The bonder run over it on skis and snowshoes. There are three stations: Drivstuen, Herdekinn, and Fogstuen built on this same mountain in order that travelers may find lodging there....at the stations there are implements and dry wood, so that the traveler may build themselves fire, and not suffer from cold, when they have to remain over night, and cannot find the way across the mountain.

— Knut Gjerset, The History of the Norwegian People

The Battle of Kringen (Slaget ved Kringen) took place in August 1612, just downstream of Dovre, where the Scottish force stayed on 24 August 1612.

== Government ==
Dovre Municipality is responsible for primary education (through 10th grade), outpatient health services, senior citizen services, welfare and other social services, zoning, economic development, and municipal roads and utilities. The municipality is governed by a municipal council of directly elected representatives. The mayor is indirectly elected by a vote of the municipal council. The municipality is under the jurisdiction of the Gudbrandsdal District Court and the Eidsivating Court of Appeal.

=== Municipal council ===
The municipal council (Kommunestyre) of Dovre Municipality is made up of 17 representatives that are elected to four year terms. The tables below show the current and historical composition of the council by political party.

Dovre kommunestyre 2023–2027
Party name (in Norwegian)	Number of representatives
Labour Party (Arbeiderpartiet)	5
Conservative Party (Høyre)	1
Centre Party (Senterpartiet)	8
Dovre List (Dovrelista)	3
Total number of members:	17

Dovre kommunestyre 2019–2023
Party name (in Norwegian)	Number of representatives
Labour Party (Arbeiderpartiet)	5
Conservative Party (Høyre)	2
Centre Party (Senterpartiet)	5
Dovre List (Dovrelista)	5
Total number of members:	17

Dovre kommunestyre 2015–2019
Party name (in Norwegian)	Number of representatives
Labour Party (Arbeiderpartiet)	4
Conservative Party (Høyre)	1
Centre Party (Senterpartiet)	10
Dovre List (Dovrelista)	2
Total number of members:	17

Dovre kommunestyre 2011–2015
Party name (in Norwegian)	Number of representatives
Labour Party (Arbeiderpartiet)	6
Progress Party (Fremskrittspartiet)	1
Conservative Party (Høyre)	2
Centre Party (Senterpartiet)	8
Total number of members:	17

Dovre kommunestyre 2007–2011
Party name (in Norwegian)	Number of representatives
Labour Party (Arbeiderpartiet)	5
Progress Party (Fremskrittspartiet)	1
Conservative Party (Høyre)	1
Centre Party (Senterpartiet)	10
Total number of members:	17

Dovre kommunestyre 2003–2007
Party name (in Norwegian)	Number of representatives
Labour Party (Arbeiderpartiet)	5
Conservative Party (Høyre)	1
Centre Party (Senterpartiet)	10
Liberal Party (Venstre)	1
Total number of members:	17

Dovre kommunestyre 1999–2003
Party name (in Norwegian)	Number of representatives
Labour Party (Arbeiderpartiet)	6
Conservative Party (Høyre)	1
Centre Party (Senterpartiet)	9
Liberal Party (Venstre)	1
Total number of members:	17

Dovre kommunestyre 1995–1999
Party name (in Norwegian)	Number of representatives
Labour Party (Arbeiderpartiet)	8
Conservative Party (Høyre)	1
Centre Party (Senterpartiet)	8
Total number of members:	17

Dovre kommunestyre 1991–1995
Party name (in Norwegian)	Number of representatives
Labour Party (Arbeiderpartiet)	7
Conservative Party (Høyre)	1
Centre Party (Senterpartiet)	5
Free voters Dovre (Frie Velgere Dovre)	4
Total number of members:	17

Dovre kommunestyre 1987–1991
Party name (in Norwegian)	Number of representatives
Labour Party (Arbeiderpartiet)	9
Conservative Party (Høyre)	1
Centre Party (Senterpartiet)	4
Free voters (Frie Velgere)	3
Total number of members:	17

Dovre kommunestyre 1983–1987
Party name (in Norwegian)	Number of representatives
Labour Party (Arbeiderpartiet)	10
Conservative Party (Høyre)	2
Centre Party (Senterpartiet)	5
Total number of members:	17

Dovre kommunestyre 1979–1983
Party name (in Norwegian)	Number of representatives
Labour Party (Arbeiderpartiet)	10
Conservative Party (Høyre)	2
Centre Party (Senterpartiet)	5
Total number of members:	17

Dovre kommunestyre 1975–1979
Party name (in Norwegian)	Number of representatives
Labour Party (Arbeiderpartiet)	10
Centre Party (Senterpartiet)	6
Free voters (Frie Velgere)	1
Total number of members:	17

Dovre kommunestyre 1971–1975
Party name (in Norwegian)	Number of representatives
Labour Party (Arbeiderpartiet)	10
Joint List(s) of Non-Socialist Parties (Borgerlige Felleslister)	7
Total number of members:	17

Dovre kommunestyre 1967–1971
Party name (in Norwegian)	Number of representatives
Labour Party (Arbeiderpartiet)	11
Joint List(s) of Non-Socialist Parties (Borgerlige Felleslister)	6
Total number of members:	17

Dovre kommunestyre 1963–1967
Party name (in Norwegian)	Number of representatives
Labour Party (Arbeiderpartiet)	11
Conservative Party (Høyre)	1
Centre Party (Senterpartiet)	4
Local List(s) (Lokale lister)	1
Total number of members:	17

Dovre herredsstyre 1959–1963
Party name (in Norwegian)	Number of representatives
Labour Party (Arbeiderpartiet)	11
Centre Party (Senterpartiet)	5
Joint List(s) of Non-Socialist Parties (Borgerlige Felleslister)	1
Total number of members:	17

Dovre herredsstyre 1955–1959
Party name (in Norwegian)	Number of representatives
Labour Party (Arbeiderpartiet)	11
Farmers' Party (Bondepartiet)	5
Local List(s) (Lokale lister)	1
Total number of members:	17

Dovre herredsstyre 1951–1955
Party name (in Norwegian)	Number of representatives
Labour Party (Arbeiderpartiet)	10
Farmers' Party (Bondepartiet)	6
Total number of members:	16

Dovre herredsstyre 1947–1951
Party name (in Norwegian)	Number of representatives
Labour Party (Arbeiderpartiet)	10
Farmers' Party (Bondepartiet)	6
Total number of members:	16

Dovre herredsstyre 1945–1947
Party name (in Norwegian)	Number of representatives
Labour Party (Arbeiderpartiet)	11
Joint List(s) of Non-Socialist Parties (Borgerlige Felleslister)	5
Total number of members:	16

Dovre herredsstyre 1937–1940*
Party name (in Norwegian)	Number of representatives
Labour Party (Arbeiderpartiet)	9
Farmers' Party (Bondepartiet)	5
Local List(s) (Lokale lister)	2
Total number of members:	16
Note: Due to the German occupation of Norway during World War II, no elections were held for new municipal councils until after the war ended in 1945.

=== Mayors ===
The mayor (Norwegian: ordfører) of Dovre Municipality is the political leader of the municipality and the chairperson of the municipal council. Here is a list of people who have held this position:

- 1861–1865: Thor P. Tofte
- 1866–1867: Lars Hansen Lindsøe
- 1867–1869: Hans O. Thomter
- 1870–1871: Rev. Hans Matzau
- 1871–1872: Gunder E. Talleraas
- 1872–1874: Tollef Solberg
- 1875–1876: Johan Jerkind
- 1877–1881: Ole Ekre
- 1882–1883: Thor T. Tofte
- 1884–1887: Ole A. Hatrem
- 1888–1891: Thor T. Tofte
- 1892–1895: Thor Lie
- 1896–1901: Edvard Olsen Landheim (V)
- 1901–1904: Bjørner Ekre
- 1905–1907: Edvard Olsen Landheim (V)
- 1908–1910: Ole Ekre
- 1911–1913: John Ruste (Ap)
- 1914–1922: Bjørner Vigerust
- 1922–1924: M.E. Killi (Bp)
- 1924–1937: Albert Guddal (Ap)
- 1937–1941: T. Schanke (Ap)
- 1941–1945: Jakob B. Vigerust (NS)
- 1945–1945: T. Schanke (Ap)
- 1946–1947: Albert Guddal (Ap)
- 1948–1955: Paul P. Enersgård (Ap)
- 1956–1962: Karl P. Schanke (Ap)
- 1962–1967: Erland Rykhus (Ap)
- 1968–1975: Martin Leren (Ap)
- 1976–1983: Gunder Bentdal (Ap)
- 1984–1991: Arne Kåre Os (Ap)
- 1992–1992: Harald Hammerstad (Ap)
- 1992–1995: Melvin Rykhus (Ap)
- 1995–2007: Erland Løkken (Sp)
- 2007–2018: Bengt Fasteraune (Sp)
- 2018–2019: Oddny Garmo (Sp)
- 2019–2023: Astrid Skomakerstuen Ruste (LL)
- 2023–present: Magne Vorkinn (Sp)

== Geography ==
The municipality is a very mountainous area. The highest point in the municipality is the 2,287.1-metre (7,504 ft) tall mountain Snøhetta. Most of the residents live in the lower valley areas along the Gudbrandsdalslågen river. The Dovrefjell, Rondane, Smiubelgen, and Sunndalsfjella mountains are all partially located within the municipality.

The municipality is bordered on the north by Oppdal Municipality (in Trøndelag county), on the east by Folldal Municipality, on the south by both Sel Municipality and Vågå Municipality, and on the northwest by Lesja Municipality.

=== National Parks ===
- Rondane National Park, which lies partially in Dovre, was the first Norwegian National Park, established on 21 December 1962. In 2003, Rondane National Park was enlarged and smaller areas of nature protection were opened or enlarged.
- Dovre National Park lies primarily in Dovre, although part lies in Folldal Municipality. It was established in 2003. Dovre National Park covers an area of 289 square kilometres (112 mi^{2}) and the altitude varies from the tree line at 1,000 metres (3,281 ft) to the peak of Storhøe. The park is located between Rondane National Park, which lies to its southeast, and Dovrefjell-Sunndalsfjella National Park on its northwest.
- Dovrefjell-Sunndalsfjella National Park was founded in 2002 and encompasses part of the former Dovrefjell National Park area (as founded in 1974). It is 1,693 square kilometres (654 mi^{2}) and encompasses areas in Dovre as well as in adjacent Lesja municipality plus areas in Trøndelag and Møre og Romsdal. It includes the whole Dovrefjell mountain range.

== Climate ==
Dovre has a boreal climate with relatively low precipitation by Norwegian standards.

Climate data for Dombås - Nordigard, Norway (638 m, 2006-2023)
Month	Jan	Feb	Mar	Apr	May	Jun	Jul	Aug	Sep	Oct	Nov	Dec	Year
Record high °C (°F)	10.2 (50.4)	10.7 (51.3)	15.3 (59.5)	18.9 (66.0)	26.4 (79.5)	28.0 (82.4)	29.6 (85.3)	25.2 (77.4)	23.5 (74.3)	17.8 (64.0)	13.5 (56.3)	10.6 (51.1)	29.6 (85.3)
Mean daily maximum °C (°F)	−3.6 (25.5)	−2.0 (28.4)	2.3 (36.1)	6.7 (44.1)	11.8 (53.2)	16.9 (62.4)	18.7 (65.7)	16.7 (62.1)	12.8 (55.0)	5.8 (42.4)	0.4 (32.7)	−3.0 (26.6)	6.9 (44.4)
Daily mean °C (°F)	−6.9 (19.6)	−5.7 (21.7)	−2.2 (28.0)	1.9 (35.4)	6.8 (44.2)	11.3 (52.3)	13.4 (56.1)	11.8 (53.2)	8.3 (46.9)	2.4 (36.3)	−2.5 (27.5)	−6.2 (20.8)	2.7 (36.8)
Mean daily minimum °C (°F)	−10.0 (14.0)	−8.8 (16.2)	−5.8 (21.6)	−2.3 (27.9)	2.2 (36.0)	6.5 (43.7)	9.0 (48.2)	7.9 (46.2)	4.8 (40.6)	−0.2 (31.6)	−5.0 (23.0)	−9.2 (15.4)	−0.9 (30.4)
Record low °C (°F)	−29.5 (−21.1)	−25.8 (−14.4)	−26.5 (−15.7)	−16.4 (2.5)	−6.9 (19.6)	−1.9 (28.6)	0.0 (32.0)	−1.3 (29.7)	−3.9 (25.0)	−13.7 (7.3)	−23.4 (−10.1)	−26.3 (−15.3)	−29.5 (−21.1)
Average precipitation mm (inches)	40.8 (1.61)	23.3 (0.92)	21.2 (0.83)	20.1 (0.79)	31.8 (1.25)	46.4 (1.83)	68.3 (2.69)	69.9 (2.75)	32.5 (1.28)	30.7 (1.21)	33.3 (1.31)	32.5 (1.28)	450.8 (17.75)
Average precipitation days (≥ 1.0 mm)	10.0	6.6	6.4	4.7	6.0	7.9	11.9	12.3	6.4	7.2	7.9	9.3	96.6
Source: Norwegian Meteorological Institute

Climate data for Fokstugu 1991-2020 (973 m)
Month	Jan	Feb	Mar	Apr	May	Jun	Jul	Aug	Sep	Oct	Nov	Dec	Year
Mean daily maximum °C (°F)	−3.9 (25.0)	−3.9 (25.0)	−1.3 (29.7)	3.2 (37.8)	8.5 (47.3)	13.1 (55.6)	16 (61)	14.5 (58.1)	10 (50)	3.8 (38.8)	−1.1 (30.0)	−3.4 (25.9)	4.6 (40.4)
Daily mean °C (°F)	−6.5 (20.3)	−6.8 (19.8)	−4.8 (23.4)	−0.6 (30.9)	4.1 (39.4)	8.3 (46.9)	11.1 (52.0)	9.9 (49.8)	6 (43)	0.6 (33.1)	−3.8 (25.2)	−6.1 (21.0)	0.9 (33.7)
Mean daily minimum °C (°F)	−10.1 (13.8)	−10.3 (13.5)	−8.5 (16.7)	−4.4 (24.1)	−0.3 (31.5)	3.6 (38.5)	6.5 (43.7)	5.9 (42.6)	2.5 (36.5)	−2.6 (27.3)	−7 (19)	−9.6 (14.7)	−2.9 (26.8)
Average precipitation mm (inches)	32.9 (1.30)	23.8 (0.94)	23.2 (0.91)	17.7 (0.70)	34.9 (1.37)	46.8 (1.84)	67.9 (2.67)	69.3 (2.73)	38 (1.5)	36.5 (1.44)	32.5 (1.28)	29.7 (1.17)	453.2 (17.85)
Average precipitation days (≥ 1.0 mm)	9	7	7	5	7	9	11	11	7	8	9	9	99
Source: NOAA - WMO averages 91-2020 Norway

== International relations ==
Dovre has sister city agreements with the following places:

- : Gronau, Lower Saxony, Germany
- : Leppävirta, Itä-Suomi, Finland
- : Storfors, Värmland County, Sweden

== Notable people ==
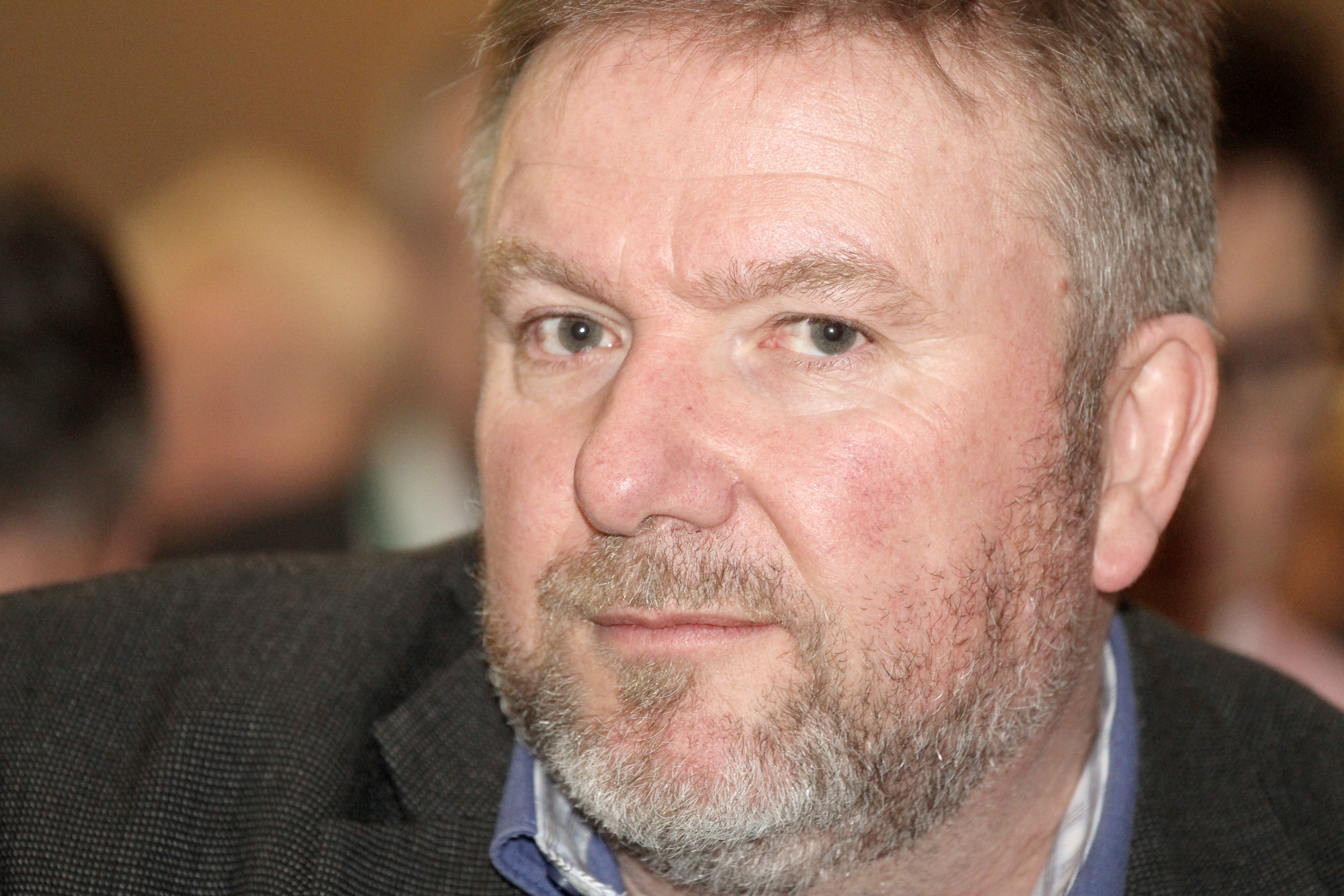
Bengt Fasteraune, 2017

- Georg Sauerwein (1831–1904), a German publisher, polyglot, poet, and linguist who lived in Dovre
- Peter P. Lee (1861 in Dovre – 1937), an American politician and Mayor of Minot, North Dakota in 1896
- Sigurd Einbu (1866–1946), a self-taught astronomer who ran the magnetic monitoring station at Dombås from 1916
- Ole Hjellemo (1873 in Dovre – 1938), a musician and composer
- Ragnar Solberg (1898 in Dovre – 1967), a poet
- Vegard Vigerust (1925 in Dovre – 2020), a novelist and poet
- Børt-Erik Thoresen (1932 in Dombås – 2011), a TV host and folk singer
- Eli Hagen (born 1947 in Dombås), a TV presenter and personality
- Bengt Fasteraune (born 1964), a Norwegian politician and Mayor of Dovre from 2007-2018
- Ivar Michal Ulekleiv (born 1966 in Dombås), a former biathlete who competed at the 1994 Winter Olympics
- Anita Killi (born 1968), an animator and film director who runs an animation studio in Dovre
