= Glan (lake) =

Lake in Östergötland, Sweden

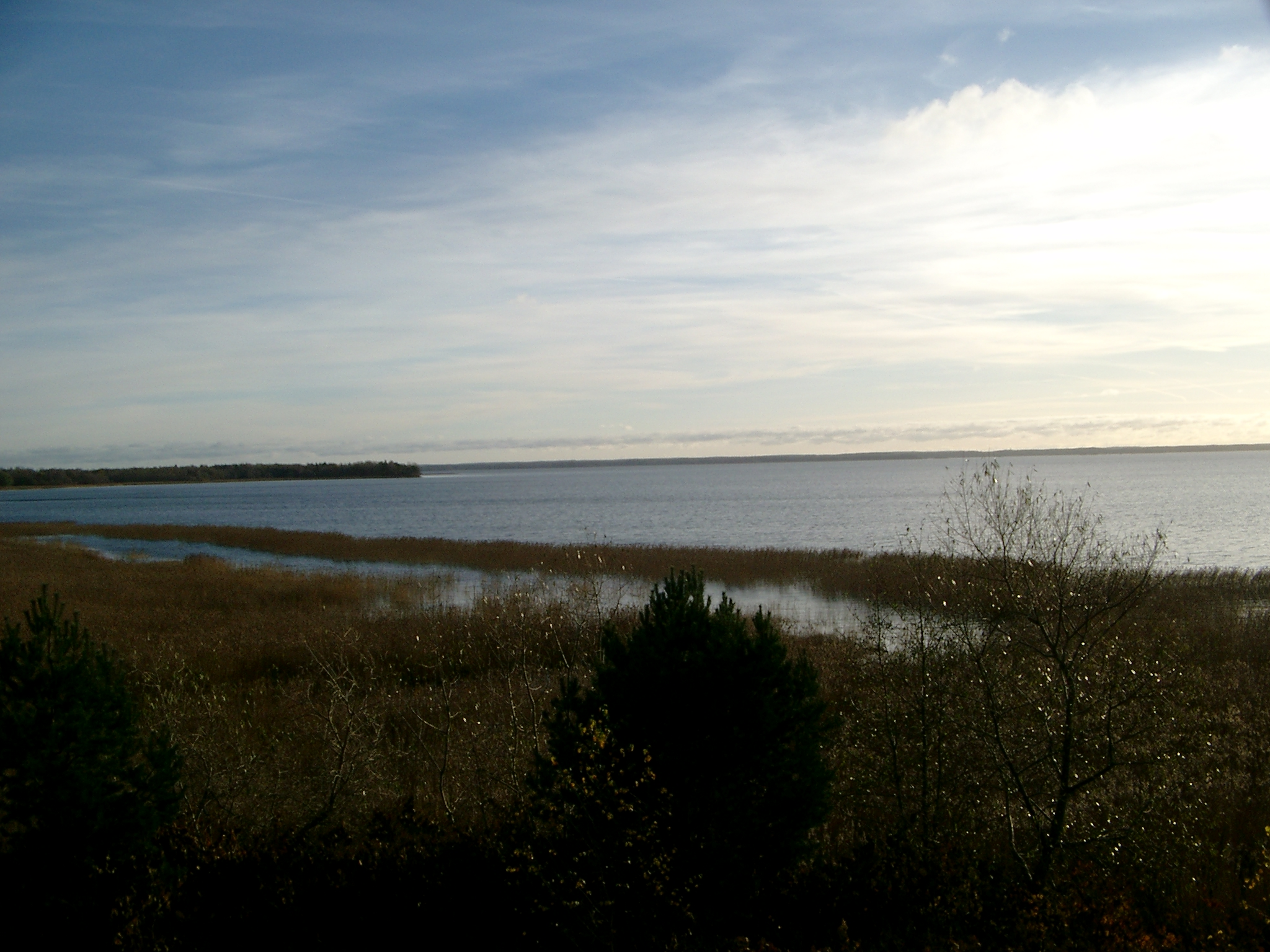
- Glan, pictured in November 2008

- Location within Östergötland
- Location: Östergötland, Sweden
- Coordinates: 58.6224°N 15.9596°E
- Surface area: 73.2 square kilometres (28.3 sq mi)
- Average depth: 22.6 meters (74 ft)

Glan (Swedish pronunciation: [ˈɡlɑːn]) is a lake in Sweden, located in the province of Östergötland, more specifically within the municipalities of Finspång and Norrköping.

The lake has a depth of 22.6 meters (74 ft) and its area is 73.2 square kilometres (28.3 sq mi). Many species of fish can be found in it, for instance perch, asp, blicca bjoerkna, common bream, zander, and northern pike. A fact that distinguishes Glan is that during the summer the temperature at the bottom stays relatively high, around 14°C. The lake is the main source of water for the city of Norrköping.
