= Dovre (village) =

Village in Dovre Municipality, Norway

- Village
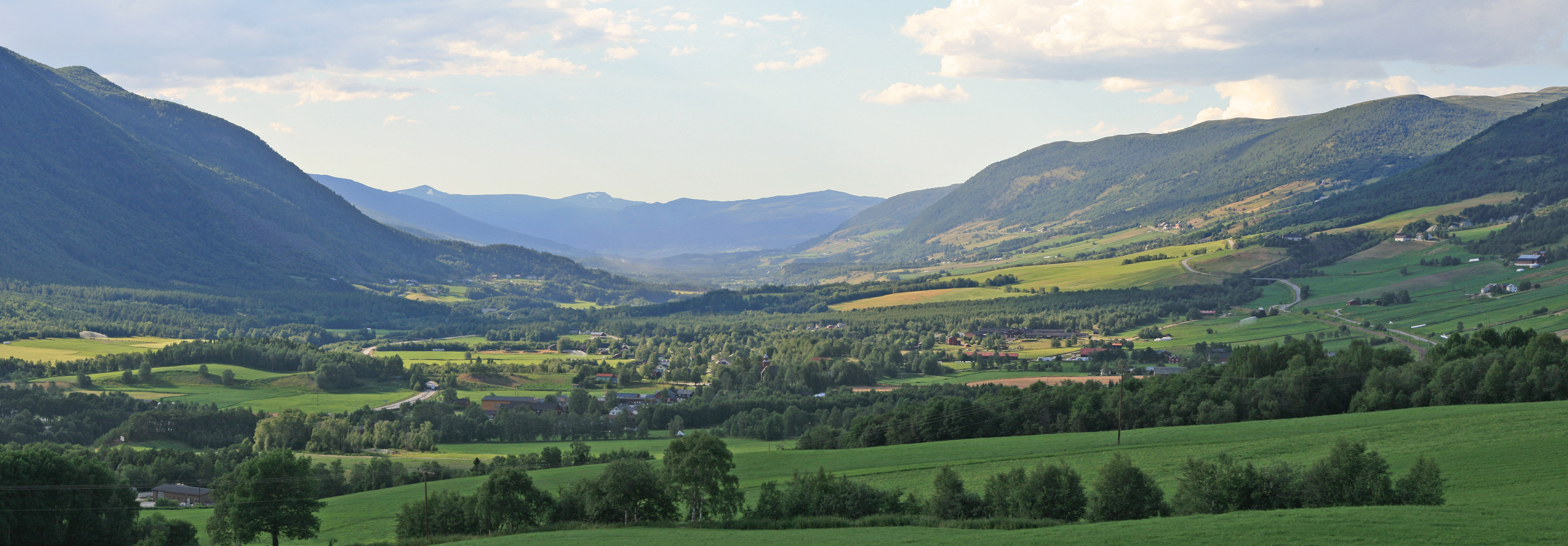
- View of the village area (looking north from south of the village)
- Interactive map of Dovre
- Location within Innlandet Location within Norway
- Coordinates: 61.9875°N 9.25556°E
- Country: Norway
- Region: Eastern Norway
- County: Innlandet
- District: Gudbrandsdalen
- Municipality: Dovre Municipality

Area
  - Total: 1.12 km^{2} (0.43 sq mi)
- Elevation: 483 m (1,585 ft)

Population (2012)
  - Total: 416
  - Density: 371/km^{2} (962/sq mi)
- Time zone: UTC+01:00 (CET)
  - Summer (DST): UTC+02:00 (CEST)
- Post Code: 2662 Dovre

Dovre is the administrative centre of Dovre Municipality in Innlandet county, Norway. The village is located along the Gudbrandsdalslågen river in the upper Gudbrandsdalen valley about 13 kilometres (8.1 mi) southeast of the village of Dombås and about 30 kilometres (19 mi) northwest of the town of Otta. Both the European route E6 highway and Dovrebanen railway line both pass through the village. Dovre Church is located in the village.

The 1.12-square-kilometre (280-acre) village had a population (2012) of 416 and a population density of 371 inhabitants per square kilometre (960/sq mi). Since 2012, the population and area data for this village area has not been separately tracked by Statistics Norway.
