= Dovre Church =

Church in Innlandet, Norway

- Dovre kyrkje
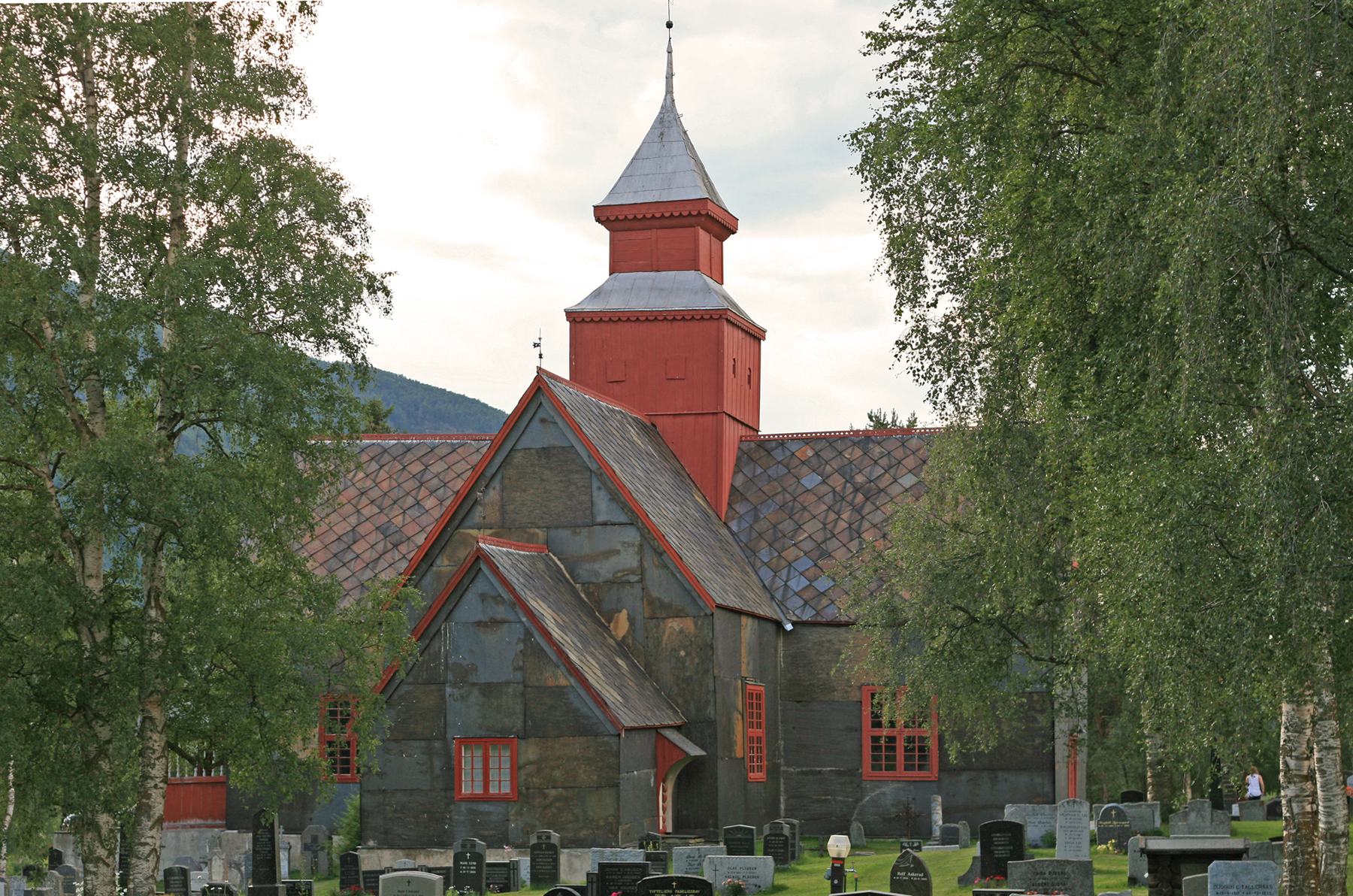
- View of the church
- Dovre Church
- 61°59′19″N 9°14′53″E
- Location: Dovre Municipality, Innlandet
- Country: Norway
- Denomination: Church of Norway
- Previous denomination: Catholic Church
- Churchmanship: Evangelical Lutheran

History
- Status: Parish church
- Founded: 13th century
- Consecrated: 21 February 1740

Architecture
- Functional status: Active
- Architect: Jesper Rusten
- Architectural type: Cruciform
- Completed: 1736 (290 years ago)

Specifications
- Capacity: 250
- Materials: Wood

Administration
- Diocese: Hamar bispedømme
- Deanery: Nord-Gudbrandsdal prosti
- Parish: Dovre
- Norwegian Cultural Heritage Site
- Type: Church
- Status: Automatically protected
- ID: 84030

Dovre Church (Norwegian: Dovre kyrkje) is a parish church of the Church of Norway in Dovre Municipality in Innlandet county, Norway. It is located in the village of Dovre. It is the church for the Dovre parish which is part of the Nord-Gudbrandsdal prosti (deanery) in the Diocese of Hamar. The slate-clad, wooden church was built in an cruciform design in 1736 using plans drawn up by the architect Jesper Rusten. The church seats about 250 people.

== History ==
The first church in Dovre was a wooden stave church that was likely built around the year 1250. Oral tradition said that King Haakon Haakonsen had the small church built there. The farm area on which it was built was a royal farm that was mentioned in old writings by the historian Snorri Sturluson who wrote that King Harald Hårfagre had a Christmas party at this site. The church was located about 1.7 kilometres (1.1 mi) north of the present church site.

Around the year 1400, a new wooden stave church was built at Bergseng, about 500 metres (1,600 ft) south of the old church. The church was described as "fragile" in 1673 and apparently needed several repairs. It was repaired 1694 and again in 1710. In 1686, the church received a new altarpiece made by Johannes Skraastad. By the 1730s, the church was in poor condition, and the ground conditions at the church site were considered unsuitable for rebuilding, so the decision was made to move the church site and build a brand new building.

In 1736, a new church was built about 1.2 kilometres (0.75 mi) to the south, closer to the valley floor. The new building was designed and built by Jesper Mikkelson Rusten, and the parish priest Niels Stockfleth participated in the design and planning of the new building. It was a timber-framed cruciform building. The medieval baptismal font from the old church as well as many of the interior furnishings were saved and moved into the new church. The new building was completed in 1736 and it was consecrated on 21 February 1740 by Bishop Niels Dorph, who gave it the name "Zion Church". The old church was torn down about two weeks before the completion of the new church. The new pulpit in the new church was carved by Lars Pinnerud.

In 1840–1841, the church underwent a major renovation which included re-siding the building with slate panels as well as rebuilding the tower (it had been taller, but it was unstable, so a new lower tower was built). Also during this renovation, the floor of the choir was raised higher, above the level of the nave floor. In 1845, the foundation of the building was strengthened. The building was remodeled and restored again in 1910 when new floors were laid, the foundation was fixed, and the church was painted. The church was again restored in 1953-1954 when the interior was repainted and redecorated in an effort to bring back the historic look of the building.

There is a Soviet war memorial in the cemetery and three graves maintained for the Commonwealth War Graves Commission.

== Media gallery ==
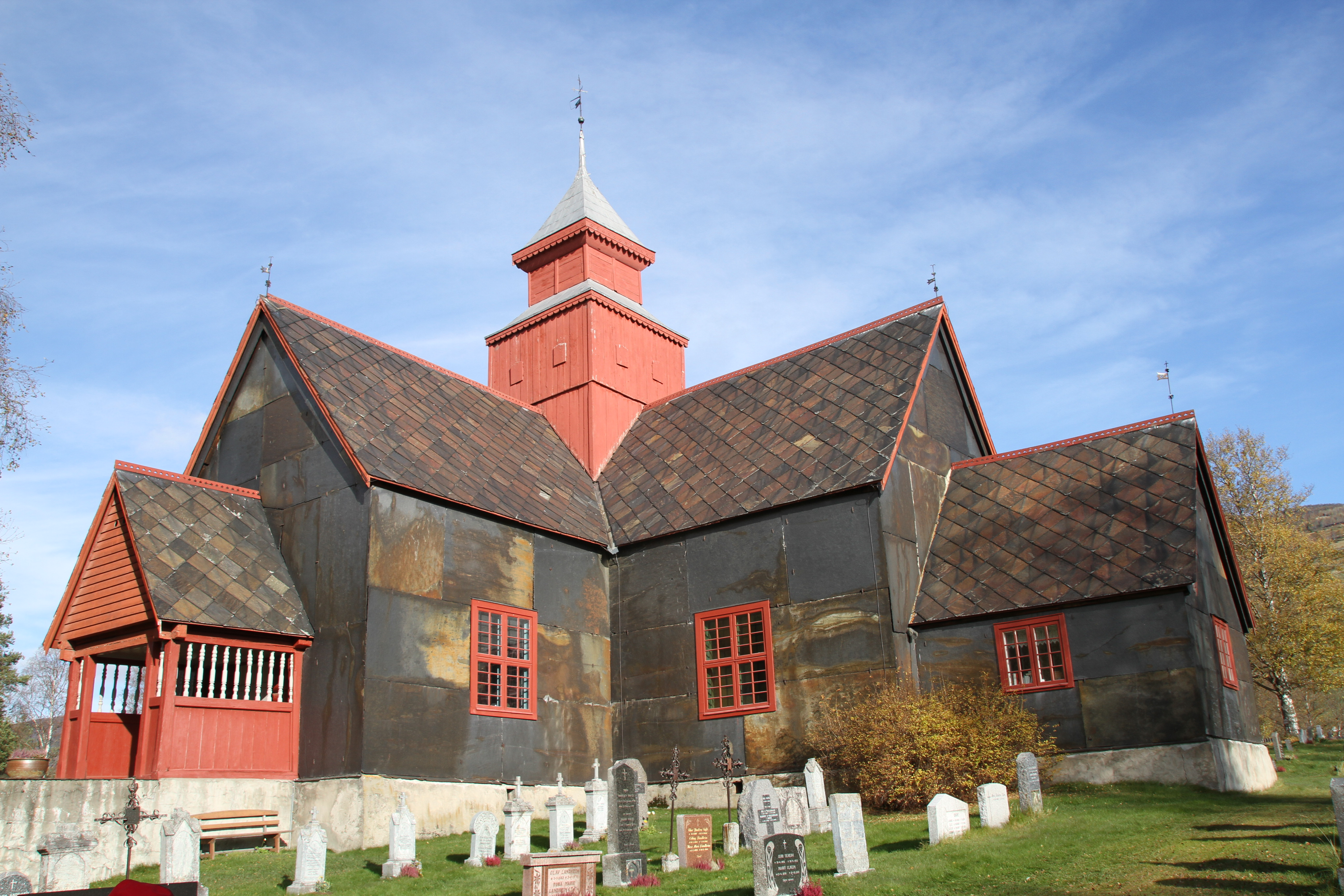

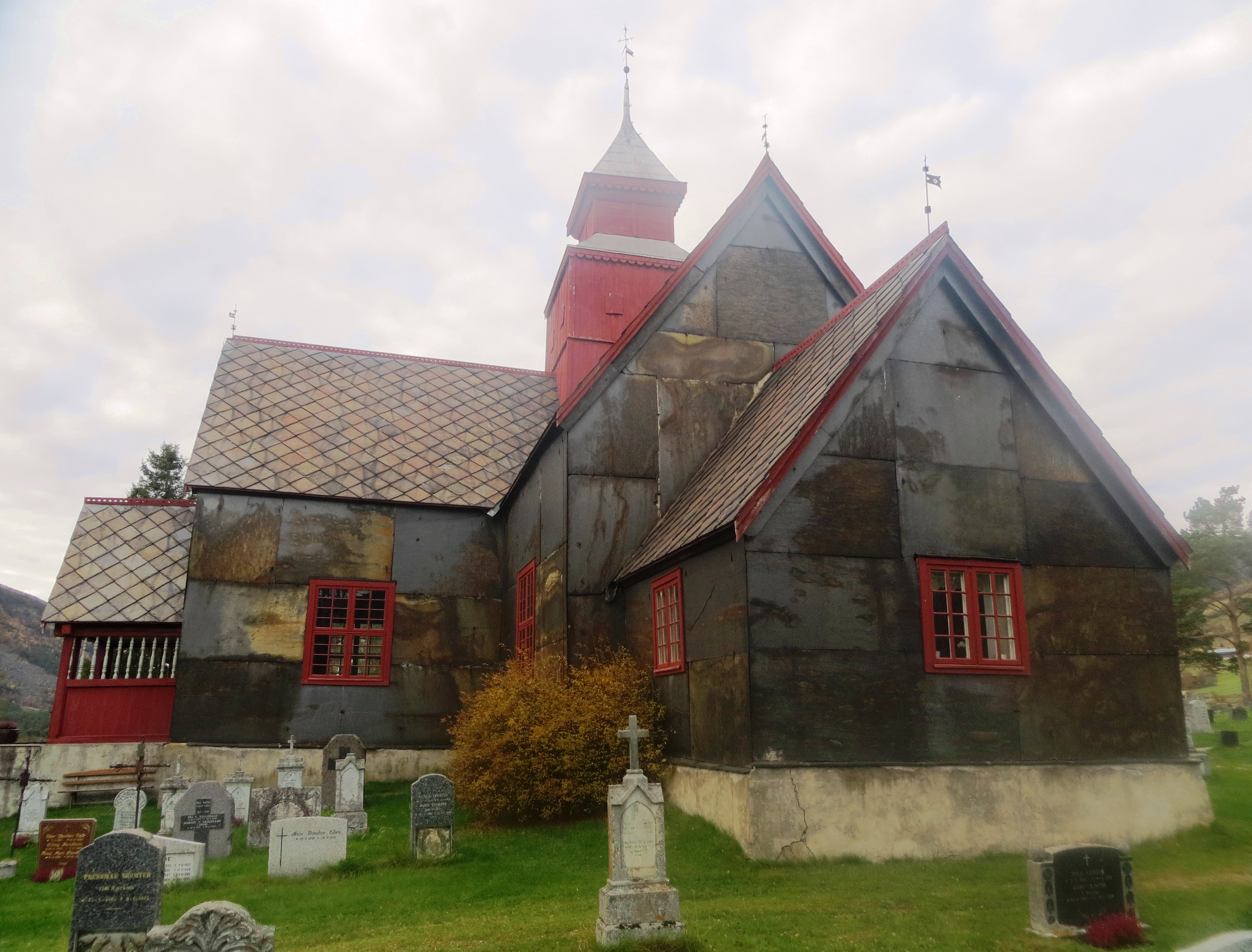

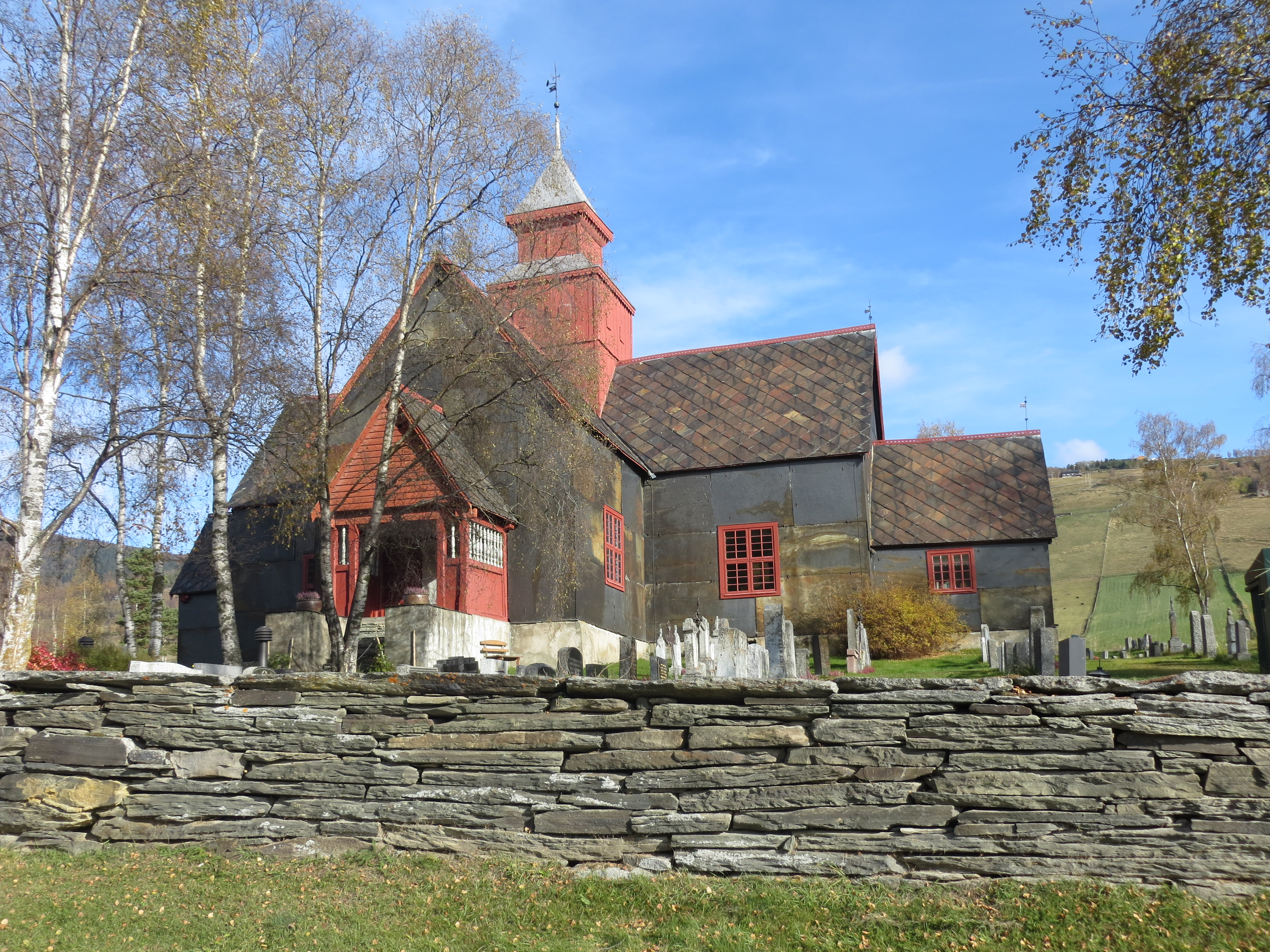

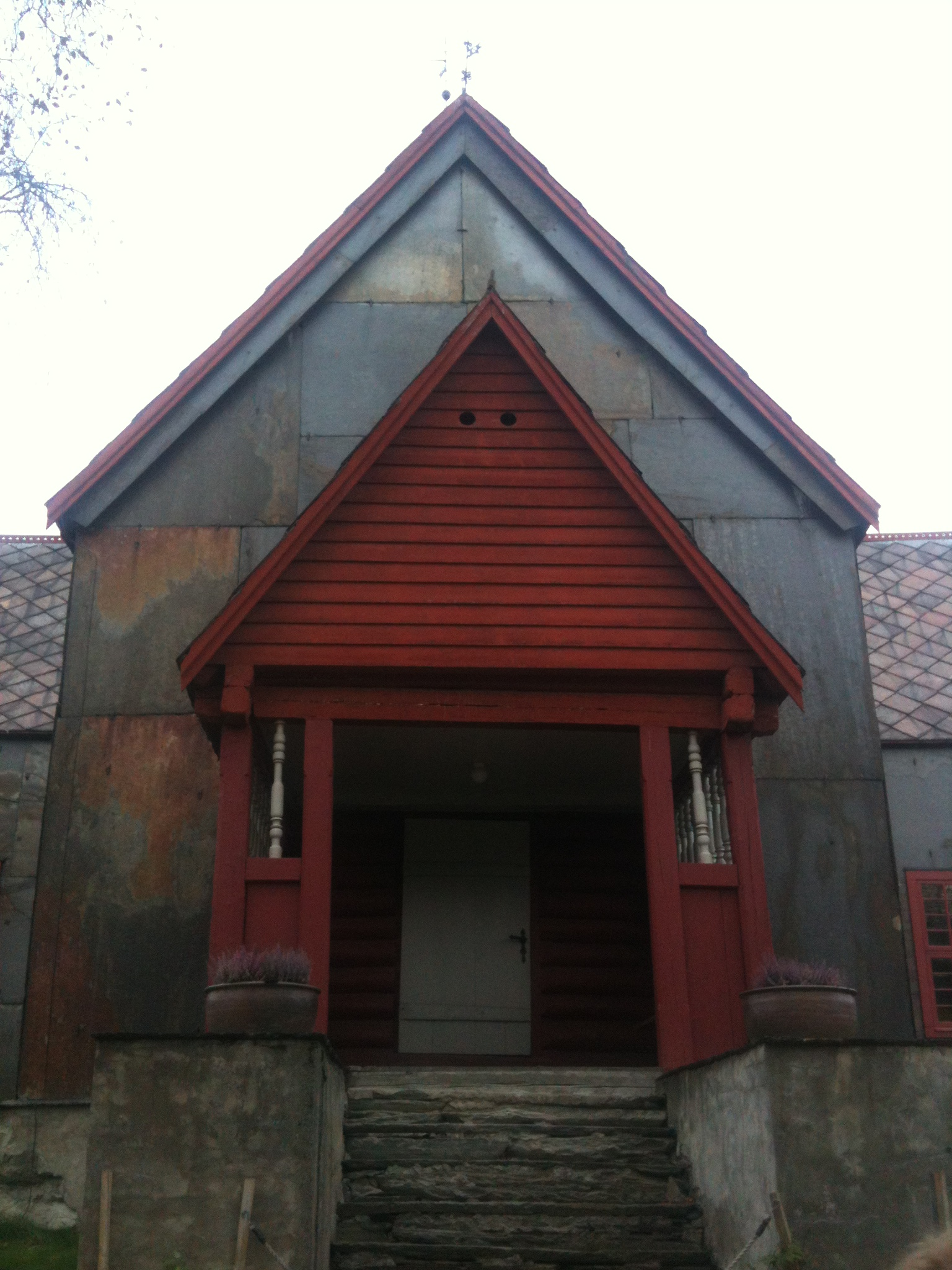

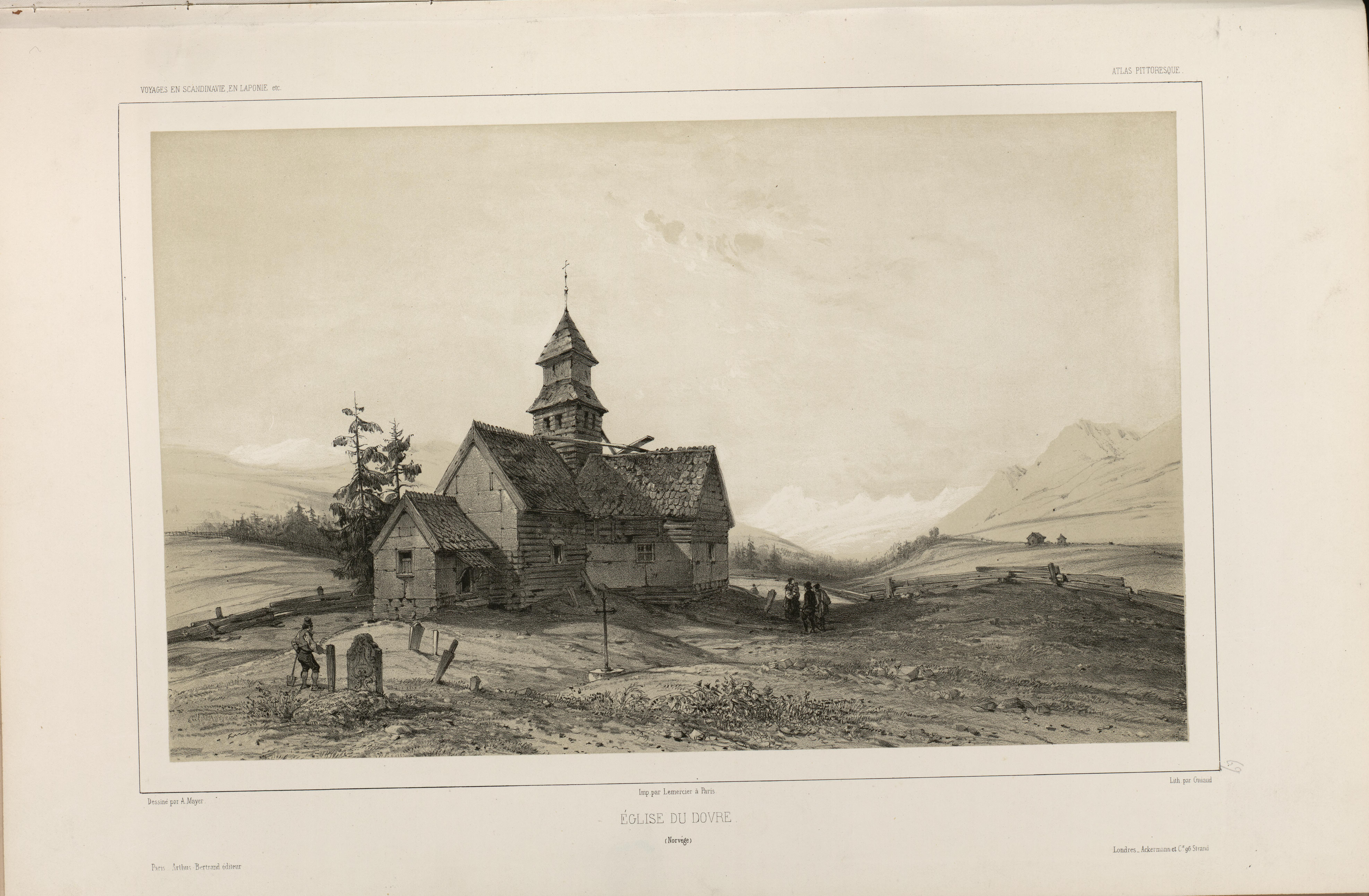

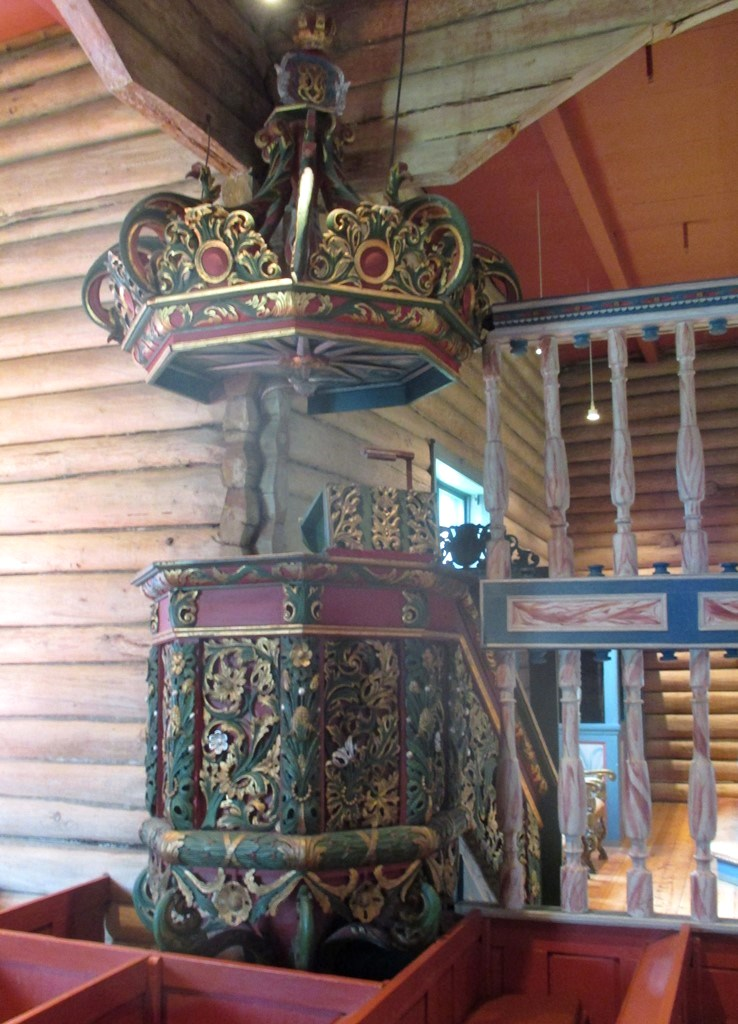

== See also ==
- List of churches in Hamar
