= Fusa Municipality =

Former municipality in Hordaland, Norway

Fusa Municipality Fusa kommune
- Former municipality
- Fuse herred (historic name)
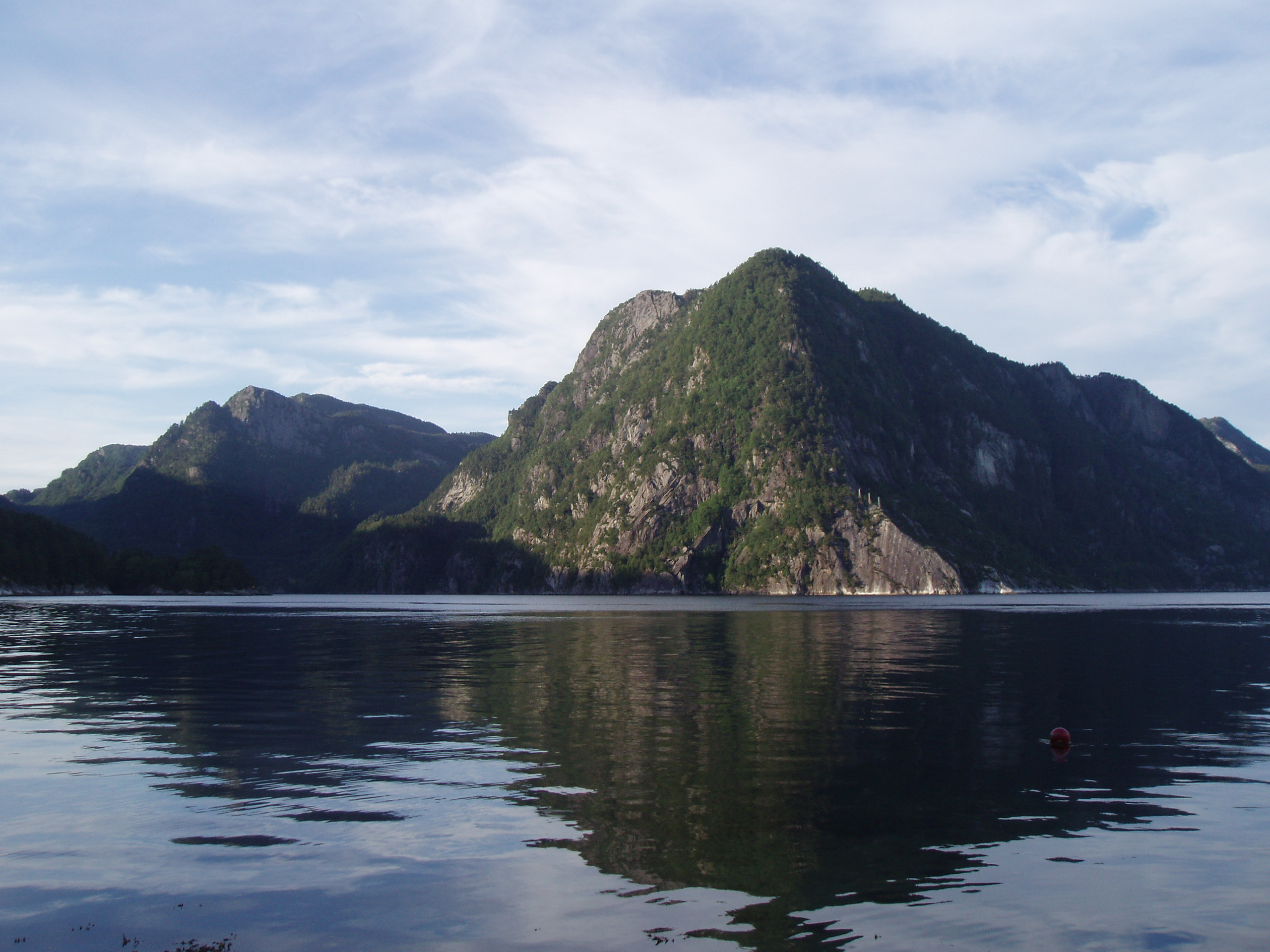
- View of the Sævareidfjorden

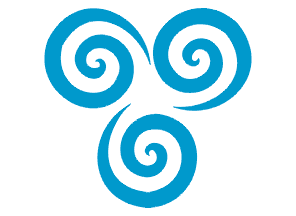
- Flag Coat of arms

- Hordaland within Norway

- Fusa within Hordaland
- Coordinates: 60°14′50″N 05°48′26″E
- Country: Norway
- County: Hordaland
- District: Midhordland
- Established: 1856
  - Preceded by: Os Municipality
- Disestablished: 1 Jan 2020
  - Succeeded by: Bjørnafjorden Municipality
- Administrative centre: Eikelandsosen

Government
  - Mayor (2009–2019): Atle Kvåle (Ap)

Area (upon dissolution)
  - Total: 377.84 km^{2} (145.88 sq mi)
  - Land: 353.71 km^{2} (136.57 sq mi)
  - Water: 24.13 km^{2} (9.32 sq mi) 6.4%
  - Rank: #247 in Norway
- Highest elevation: 1,299.1 m (4,262 ft)

Population (2019)
  - Total: 3,861
  - Rank: #235 in Norway
  - Density: 10.2/km^{2} (26/sq mi)
  - Change (10 years): ▲ +1.8%
- Demonym: Fusing

Official language
  - Norwegian form: Nynorsk
- Time zone: UTC+01:00 (CET)
  - Summer (DST): UTC+02:00 (CEST)
- ISO 3166 code: NO-1241

Fusa (Urban East Norwegian: [ˈfʉ̂ːsɑ]) is a former municipality in the old Hordaland county, Norway. The 377.84-square-kilometre (145.88 sq mi) municipality existed from 1856 until its dissolution in 2020. The area is now part of Bjørnafjorden Municipality in the traditional district of Midhordland in Vestland county. The administrative centre was the village of Eikelandsosen. Other villages in the municipality included Fusa, Holdhus, Holmefjord, Strandvik, and Sundvor.

Prior to its dissolution in 2020, the 377.84-square-kilometre (145.88 sq mi) municipality was the 247th largest by area out of the 422 municipalities in Norway. Fusa Municipality was the 235th most populous municipality in Norway with a population of about 3,861. The municipality's population density was 10.2 inhabitants per square kilometre (26/sq mi) and its population had increased by 1.8% over the previous 10-year period.

The Frank Mohn company's Fusa marine division was headquartered in the municipality, with almost 500 employees.

== General information ==
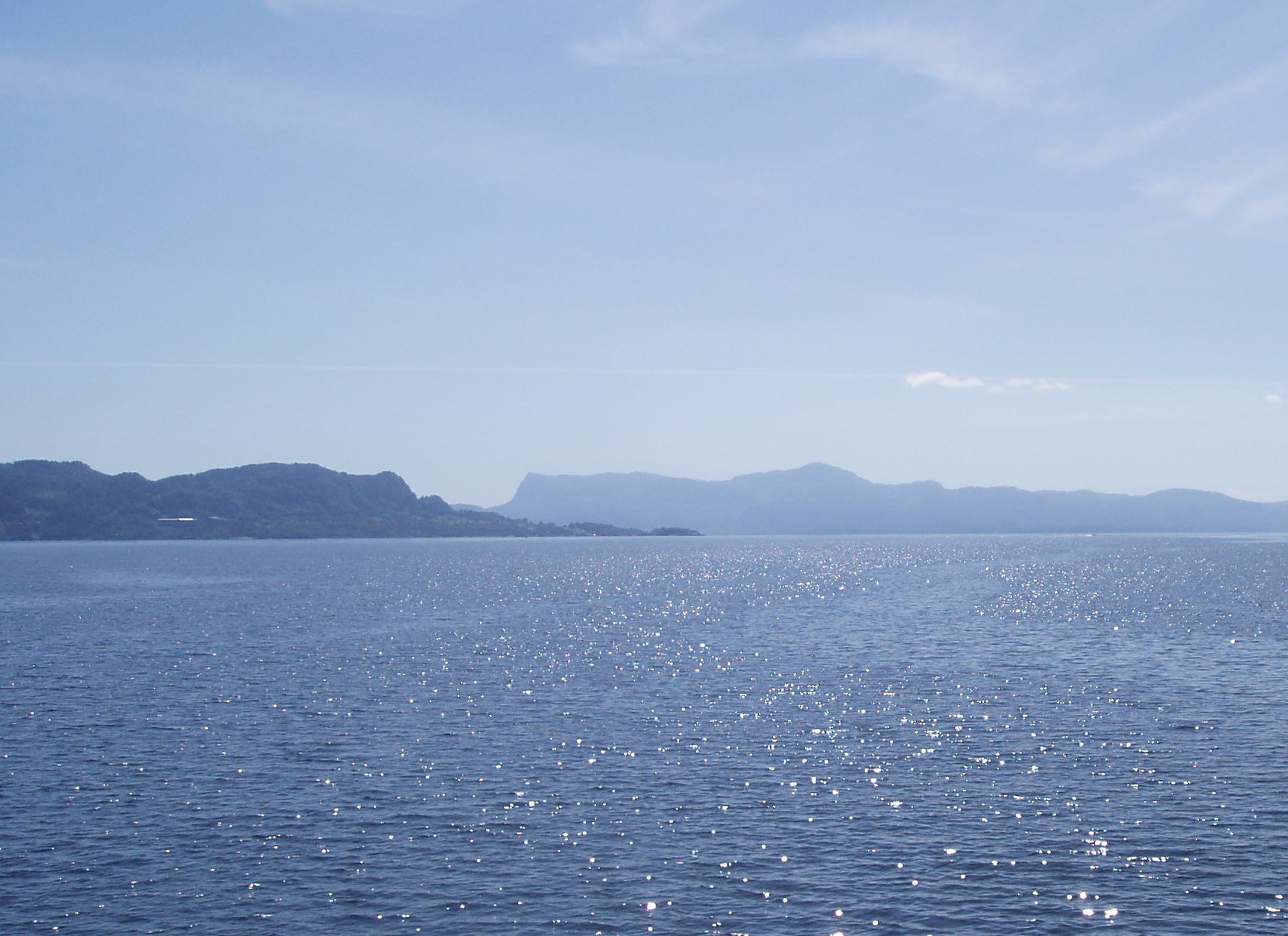
View of the Fusafjorden

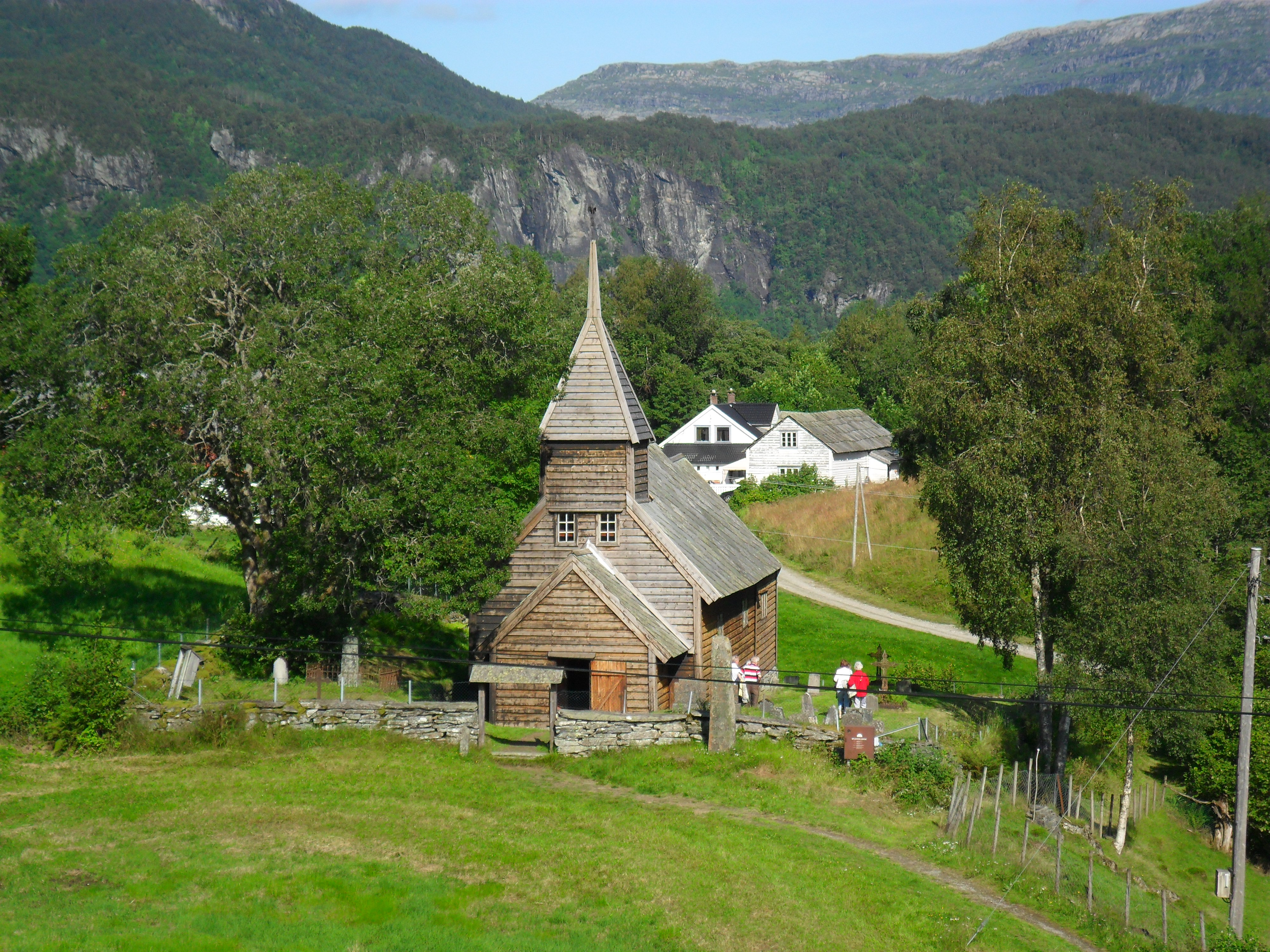
Historic church in Holdhus

The parish of Fuse (later spelled Fusa) was established as a municipality in 1856 when the large Os Municipality was divided in two. Initially, the new Fuse Municipality had 3,173 residents.

On 1 January 1903 Fusa Municipality was divided into three municipalities as follows:

- the southern area (population: 1,876) became the new Strandvik Municipality
- the northeastern area (population: 647) became the new Haalandsdalen Municipality (later spelled Hålandsdal)
- the northwestern area (population: 1,072) became a much smaller Fusa Municipality

During the 1960s, there were many municipal mergers across Norway due to the work of the Schei Committee. On 1 January 1964, Fusa Municipality was enlarged by merging the following areas:

- all of Hålandsdal Municipality (population: 528)
- all of Strandvik Municipality (population: 2,053)
- most of Fusa Municipality (population: 1,466), except for the Bogstrand area on the west side of the Fusafjorden which was transferred to Os Municipality

On 1 January 2020, Fusa Municipality and Os Municipality were merged to form the new Bjørnafjorden Municipality. Historically, this municipality was part of the old Hordaland county. Also on 1 January 2020, the new Bjørnafjorden Municipality became a part of the newly-formed Vestland county (after Hordaland and Sogn og Fjordane counties were merged).

=== Name ===
The municipality (originally the parish) is named after the old Fusa farm (Old Norse: Fúsar) since the first Fusa Church was built there. The meaning of the name is uncertain. The name could be the plural form of the word fúss which means "eager" or "longing". Another possibility is that it comes from the verb fusa or its alternate spelling fuse which both mean "to rush" (as in rushing water). Historically, the name of the municipality was spelled Fuse. On 3 November 1917, a royal resolution changed the spelling of the name of the municipality to Fusa.

=== Coat of arms ===
The coat of arms was granted on 27 September 1991 and it was in use until 1 January 2020 when the municipality was dissolved. The official blazon is "Argent, three gurges azure in pall" (Norwegian: På kvit grunn tre blå spiralar stilte i trepass). This means the arms have a field (background) has a tincture of argent which means it is commonly colored white, but if it is made out of metal, then silver is used. The charge is a set of three spirals, two over one. The design was chosen to symbolise the strong currents in the Fusafjorden and Bjørnafjorden. The spirals also symbolise the many giant's kettles (Norwegian: jettegryte) in the municipality, which were created by the water in the rocks. The arms were designed by Arvid Sveen. The municipal flag has the same design as the coat of arms.

=== Churches ===
The Church of Norway had one parish (sokn) within Fusa Municipality. It was part of the Hardanger og Voss prosti (deanery) in the Diocese of Bjørgvin.

Churches in Fusa Municipality
Parish (sokn)	Church name	Location of the church	Year built
Fusa	Fusa Church	Fusa	1961
Fusa	Holdhus Church	Holdhus	1726
Fusa	Hålandsdal Church	Eide in Hålandsdal	1890
Fusa	Strandvik Church	Strandvik	1857
Fusa	Sundvor Church	Sundvor	1927

== Geography ==
Fusa Municipality was located at the inner end of the Bjørnafjorden and its small arm, the Fusafjorden. Os Municipality was located across the fjord to the west, Samnanger Municipality was to the north, Kvam Municipality was to the east, and Kvinnherad Municipality was to the south. Lakes in Fusa included Gjønavatnet, Skogseidvatnet, and Henangervatnet. The highest point in the municipality was the 1,299.1-metre (4,262 ft) tall mountain Tveitakvitingen, located on the northern border of the municipality.

== Population ==
Historical population

Year	Pop.	±% p.a.
1856	3,173	—
1865	3,174	+0.00%
1875	3,284	+0.34%
1891	3,475	+0.35%
1900	3,784	+0.95%
1910	1,232	−10.61%

Year	Pop.	±% p.a.
1920	1,291	+0.47%
1930	1,290	−0.01%
1946	1,449	+0.73%
1951	1,514	+0.88%
1960	1,516	+0.01%
1970	3,916	+9.95%

Year	Pop.	±% p.a.
1980	3,765	−0.39%
1990	3,727	−0.10%
2000	3,684	−0.12%
2010	3,823	+0.37%
2019	3,861	+0.11%

Note: The municipal borders were changed in 1903 and 1964, causing a significant change in the population.
Source: Statistics Norway and Norwegian Historical Data Centre

== Government ==
While it existed, Fusa Municipality was responsible for primary education (through 10th grade), outpatient health services, senior citizen services, welfare and other social services, zoning, economic development, and municipal roads and utilities. The municipality was governed by a municipal council of directly elected representatives. The mayor was indirectly elected by a vote of the municipal council. The municipality was under the jurisdiction of the Bergen District Court and the Gulating Court of Appeal.

=== Municipal council ===
The municipal council (Kommunestyre) of Fusa Municipality was made up of 21 representatives that are elected to four year terms. The party breakdown of the final municipal council was as follows:

Fusa kommunestyre 2015–2019
Party name (in Nynorsk)	Number of representatives
Labour Party (Arbeidarpartiet)	6
Progress Party (Framstegspartiet)	3
Conservative Party (Høgre)	3
Christian Democratic Party (Kristeleg Folkeparti)	2
Centre Party (Senterpartiet)	6
Liberal Party (Venstre)	1
Total number of members:	21
Note: On 1 January 2020, Fusa Municipality and Os Municipality were merged to form the new Bjørnafjorden Municipality.

Fusa kommunestyre 2011–2015
Party name (in Nynorsk)	Number of representatives
Labour Party (Arbeidarpartiet)	3
Progress Party (Framstegspartiet)	4
Conservative Party (Høgre)	3
Christian Democratic Party (Kristeleg Folkeparti)	3
Centre Party (Senterpartiet)	6
Socialist Left Party (Sosialistisk Venstreparti)	1
Liberal Party (Venstre)	1
Total number of members:	21

Fusa kommunestyre 2007–2011
Party name (in Nynorsk)	Number of representatives
Labour Party (Arbeidarpartiet)	4
Progress Party (Framstegspartiet)	6
Conservative Party (Høgre)	2
Christian Democratic Party (Kristeleg Folkeparti)	3
Centre Party (Senterpartiet)	8
Socialist Left Party (Sosialistisk Venstreparti)	1
Liberal Party (Venstre)	1
Total number of members:	25

Fusa kommunestyre 2003–2007
Party name (in Nynorsk)	Number of representatives
Labour Party (Arbeidarpartiet)	3
Progress Party (Framstegspartiet)	2
Conservative Party (Høgre)	3
Christian Democratic Party (Kristeleg Folkeparti)	4
Centre Party (Senterpartiet)	6
Socialist Left Party (Sosialistisk Venstreparti)	2
Liberal Party (Venstre)	1
Cross-Party Common List (Tverrpolitisk Samlingsliste)	4
Total number of members:	25

Fusa kommunestyre 1999–2003
Party name (in Nynorsk)	Number of representatives
Labour Party (Arbeidarpartiet)	4
Progress Party (Framstegspartiet)	2
Conservative Party (Høgre)	3
Christian Democratic Party (Kristeleg Folkeparti)	6
Centre Party (Senterpartiet)	7
Socialist Left Party (Sosialistisk Venstreparti)	2
Liberal Party (Venstre)	1
Cross-Party Common List (Tverrpolitisk Samlingsliste)	4
Total number of members:	29

Fusa kommunestyre 1995–1999
Party name (in Nynorsk)	Number of representatives
Labour Party (Arbeidarpartiet)	5
Conservative Party (Høgre)	3
Christian Democratic Party (Kristeleg Folkeparti)	4
Centre Party (Senterpartiet)	8
Socialist Left Party (Sosialistisk Venstreparti)	2
Liberal Party (Venstre)	2
Common list (Samlingslista)	5
Total number of members:	29

Fusa kommunestyre 1991–1995
Party name (in Nynorsk)	Number of representatives
Labour Party (Arbeidarpartiet)	4
Conservative Party (Høgre)	3
Christian Democratic Party (Kristeleg Folkeparti)	4
Centre Party (Senterpartiet)	8
Socialist Left Party (Sosialistisk Venstreparti)	1
Liberal Party (Venstre)	4
Common list (Samlingslista)	5
Total number of members:	29

Fusa kommunestyre 1987–1991
Party name (in Nynorsk)	Number of representatives
Labour Party (Arbeidarpartiet)	7
Conservative Party (Høgre)	6
Christian Democratic Party (Kristeleg Folkeparti)	5
Centre Party (Senterpartiet)	7
Liberal Party (Venstre)	4
Total number of members:	29

Fusa kommunestyre 1983–1987
Party name (in Nynorsk)	Number of representatives
Labour Party (Arbeidarpartiet)	5
Conservative Party (Høgre)	4
Christian Democratic Party (Kristeleg Folkeparti)	6
Centre Party (Senterpartiet)	4
Liberal Party (Venstre)	3
Local list for Strandvik/Vinnes, Skjørsand, and Fusa (Bygdeliste for Strandvik/Vinnes, Skjørsand og Fusa)	6
Common list (Samlingslista)	1
Total number of members:	29

Fusa kommunestyre 1979–1983
Party name (in Nynorsk)	Number of representatives
Labour Party (Arbeidarpartiet)	4
Conservative Party (Høgre)	5
Christian Democratic Party (Kristeleg Folkeparti)	5
New People's Party (Nye Folkepartiet)	1
Centre Party (Senterpartiet)	5
Liberal Party (Venstre)	4
Local list for Strandvik, Vinnes, Skjørsand, and Fusa (Bygdelista for Strandvik, Vinnes, Skjørsand og Fusa)	5
Total number of members:	29

Fusa kommunestyre 1975–1979
Party name (in Nynorsk)	Number of representatives
Labour Party (Arbeidarpartiet)	7
Conservative Party (Høgre)	3
Christian Democratic Party (Kristeleg Folkeparti)	5
Centre Party (Senterpartiet)	9
Joint list of the Liberal Party (Venstre) and New People's Party (Nye Folkepartiet)	5
Total number of members:	29

Fusa kommunestyre 1971–1975
Party name (in Nynorsk)	Number of representatives
Labour Party (Arbeidarpartiet)	6
Conservative Party (Høgre)	2
Christian Democratic Party (Kristeleg Folkeparti)	6
Centre Party (Senterpartiet)	9
Liberal Party (Venstre)	6
Total number of members:	29

Fusa kommunestyre 1967–1971
Party name (in Nynorsk)	Number of representatives
Labour Party (Arbeidarpartiet)	6
Conservative Party (Høgre)	2
Christian Democratic Party (Kristeleg Folkeparti)	7
Centre Party (Senterpartiet)	9
Liberal Party (Venstre)	5
Total number of members:	29

Fusa kommunestyre 1963–1967
Party name (in Nynorsk)	Number of representatives
Labour Party (Arbeidarpartiet)	3
Local List(s) (Lokale lister)	26
Total number of members:	29

Fusa heradsstyre 1959–1963
Party name (in Nynorsk)	Number of representatives
Local List(s) (Lokale lister)	15
Total number of members:	15

Fusa heradsstyre 1955–1959
Party name (in Nynorsk)	Number of representatives
Local List(s) (Lokale lister)	15
Total number of members:	15

Fusa heradsstyre 1951–1955
Party name (in Nynorsk)	Number of representatives
Labour Party (Arbeidarpartiet)	2
Local List(s) (Lokale lister)	10
Total number of members:	12

Fusa heradsstyre 1947–1951
Party name (in Nynorsk)	Number of representatives
Local List(s) (Lokale lister)	12
Total number of members:	12

Fusa heradsstyre 1945–1947
Party name (in Nynorsk)	Number of representatives
Labour Party (Arbeidarpartiet)	2
Local List(s) (Lokale lister)	10
Total number of members:	12

Fusa heradsstyre 1937–1941*
Party name (in Nynorsk)	Number of representatives
Labour Party (Arbeidarpartiet)	2
Local List(s) (Lokale lister)	10
Total number of members:	12
Note: Due to the German occupation of Norway during World War II, no elections were held for new municipal councils until after the war ended in 1945.

=== Mayors ===
The mayor (Nynorsk: ordførar) of Fusa Municipality was the political leader of the municipality and the chairperson of the municipal council. In 2007, Fusa participated in a national trial where the mayor was directly elected. The sitting mayor, Hans S. Vindenes, won the election with 51.8% of the votes. The following people have held this position:

- 1856–1859: Hans Christian Krüger
- 1860–1861: Samson Gerhard Meidell
- 1862–1871: Hans Christian Krüger
- 1872–1875: Berge Ingebrigtsen Skaathun
- 1876–1879: Ole Brandanger
- 1880–1883: Hans Andersen Havsgaard
- 1884–1889: Anders Hansen Bolstad
- 1890–1910: John Dahl
- 1911–1916: Johannes Dale
- 1917–1919: Olav Foer
- 1920–1934: Hans Berge
- 1935–1937: Johan O. Samnøy
- 1938–1940: Hans Christian Ekeberg
- 1941–1944: Johan O. Samnøy
- 1945–1945: Hans Christian Ekeberg
- 1946–1947: Johan O. Samnøy
- 1947–1959: Hans H. Helland
- 1959–1964: Anders Samnøy
- 1964–1975: Peter Haugarvoll (Sp)
- 1975–1983: Gitle Havsgård (Sp)
- 1983–1987: Asbjørn Malvin Heidal (KrF)
- 1987–1991: Jan Koldal (V)
- 1991–1999: Hans J. Berge (Sp)
- 1999–2003: Asbjørn Malvin Heidal (KrF)
- 2003–2015: Hans S. Vindenes (Sp)
- 2015–2019: Atle Kvåle(Ap)

== See also ==
- List of former municipalities of Norway
