= Hålandsdal Municipality =

Former municipality in Hordaland, Norway

Hålandsdal Municipality Hålandsdal herad
- Former municipality
- Haalandsdal herred (historic name); Haalandsdalen herred (historic name)
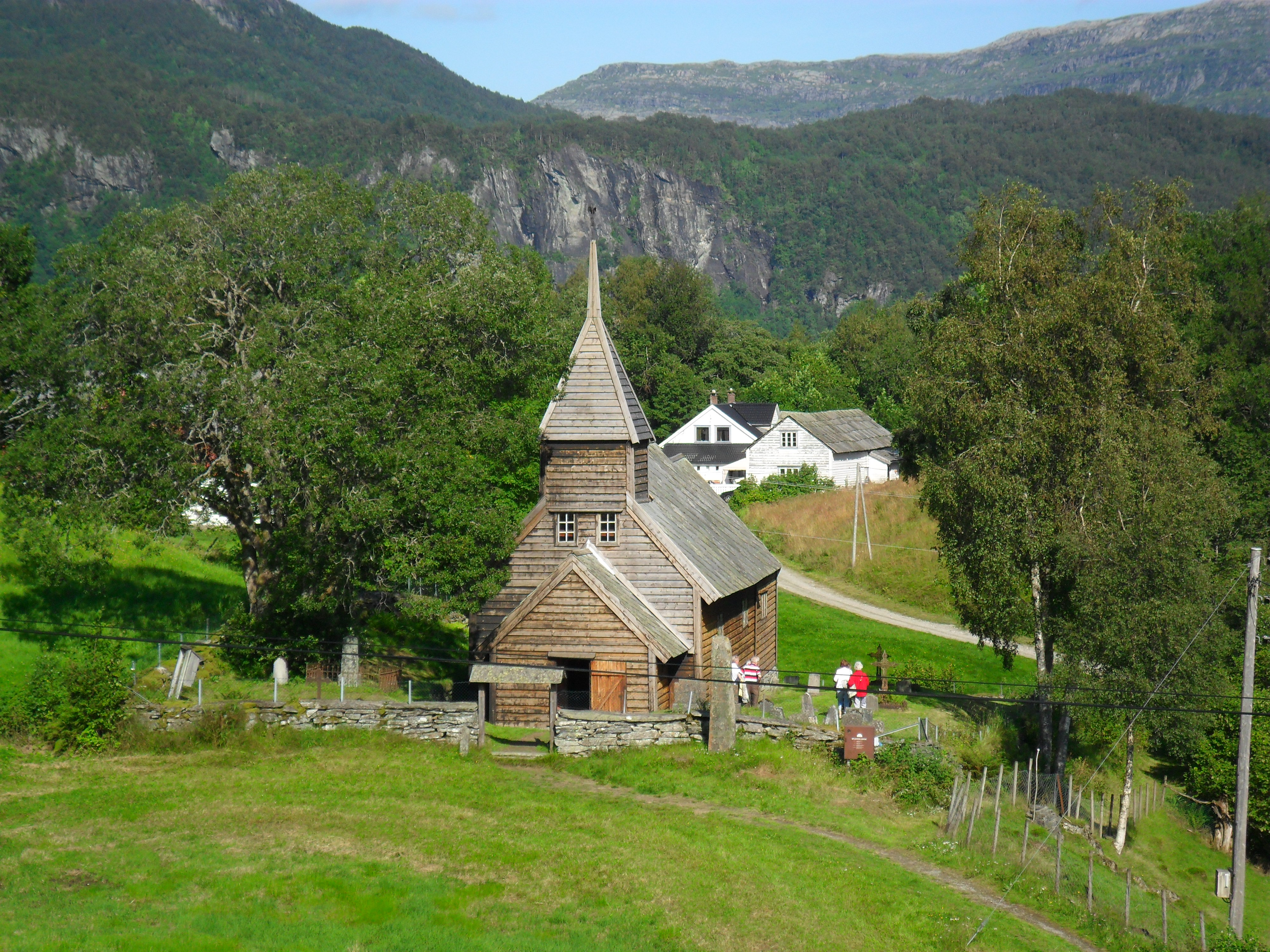
- View of Holdhus Church in Hålandsdal

- Hordaland within Norway

- Hålandsdal within Hordaland
- Coordinates: 60°14′N 05°49′E
- Country: Norway
- County: Hordaland
- District: Midhordland
- Established: 1 Jan 1903
  - Preceded by: Fusa Municipality
- Disestablished: 1 Jan 1964
  - Succeeded by: Fusa Municipality
- Administrative centre: Holdhus

Government
  - Mayor (1951–1963): Ingebrigt Eide (Sp)

Area (upon dissolution)
  - Total: 130.7 km^{2} (50.5 sq mi)
  - Rank: #462 in Norway
- Highest elevation: 1,299 m (4,262 ft)

Population (1963)
  - Total: 534
  - Rank: #675 in Norway
  - Density: 4.1/km^{2} (11/sq mi)
  - Change (10 years): ▼ −10.6%
- Demonym: Hålandsdøl

Official language
  - Norwegian form: Nynorsk
- Time zone: UTC+01:00 (CET)
  - Summer (DST): UTC+02:00 (CEST)
- ISO 3166 code: NO-1239

Hålandsdal is a former municipality in the old Hordaland county, Norway. The 130.7-square-kilometre (50.5 sq mi) municipality existed from 1903 until its dissolution in 1964. The area is now part of Bjørnafjorden Municipality in the traditional district of Midhordland in Vestland county. The administrative centre was the village of Holdhus where the Holdhus Church is located.

Prior to its dissolution in 1964, the 130.7-square-kilometre (50.5 sq mi) municipality was the 462nd largest by area out of the 689 municipalities in Norway. Hålandsdal Municipality was the 675th most populous municipality in Norway with a population of about 534. The municipality's population density was 4.1 inhabitants per square kilometre (11/sq mi) and its population had decreased by 10.6% over the previous 10-year period.

== General information ==
This municipality was established on 1 January 1903 when Fusa Municipality was divided into three municipalities as follows:

- the southern area (population: 1,876) became the new Strandvik Municipality
- the northeastern area (population: 647) became the new Haalandsdalen Municipality (later spelled Hålandsdal)
- the northwestern area (population: 1,072) became a much smaller Fusa Municipality

During the 1960s, there were many municipal mergers across Norway due to the work of the Schei Committee. On 1 January 1964, this municipality was dissolved and the following areas were merged to form a new, larger Fusa Municipality:

- all of Hålandsdal Municipality (population: 528)
- all of Strandvik Municipality (population: 2,053)
- most of Fusa Municipality (population: 1,466), except for the Bogstrand area which was transferred to Os Municipality

=== Name ===
The municipality (originally the parish) is named after the valley that is the site of the old Haaland farm (Old Norse: Hávaland or Háland) since the first Hålandsdal Church was built there. The first element comes from the word hár which means "high" or "tall". The second element is land which means "land". The last element of the name comes from dalr which means "valley" or "dale".

Historically, the name of the municipality (and the Church of Norway parish) was spelled Haalandsdalen. On 3 November 1917, a royal resolution changed the spelling of the name of the municipality to Haalandsdal, removing the definite form ending -en. On 21 December 1917, a royal resolution enacted the 1917 Norwegian language reforms. Prior to this change, the name was spelled Haalandsdal with the digraph "aa", and after this reform, the name was spelled Hålandsdal, using the letter å instead.

=== Churches ===
The Church of Norway had one parish (sokn) within Hålandsdal Municipality. At the time of the municipal dissolution, it was part of the Fusa prestegjeld and the Midhordland prosti (deanery) in the Diocese of Bjørgvin.

Churches in Hålandsdal Municipality
Parish (sokn)	Church name	Location of the church	Year built
Hålandsdal	Hålandsdal Church	Eide, just east of Holdhus	1890
Hålandsdal	Holdhus Church	Holdhus	1726

== Geography ==
The municipality included the Øvre Hålandsdalen valley, the sparsely populated Kikedalen valley and the areas surrounding the large lakes Skogseidvatnet, Gjønavatnet, Vengsvatnet, and the eastern end of the Henangervatnet. The highest point in the municipality was the 1,299-metre (4,262 ft) tall mountain Tveitakvitingen, a quadripoint on the borders of Samnanger Municipality, Strandebarm Municipality, Kvam Municipality, and Hålandsdal Municipality. Other high peaks include Gjønakvitingen and Ottanosa.

Samnanger Municipality was located to the north, Kvam Municipality was located to the northeast, Strandebarm Municipality was located to the east, Varaldsøy Municipality was located to the southeast, Strandvik Municipality was located to the southwest, and Fusa Municipality was located to the west.

== Government ==
While it existed, Hålandsdal Municipality was responsible for primary education (through 10th grade), outpatient health services, senior citizen services, welfare and other social services, zoning, economic development, and municipal roads and utilities. The municipality was governed by a municipal council of directly elected representatives. The mayor was indirectly elected by a vote of the municipal council. The municipality was under the jurisdiction of the Gulating Court of Appeal.

=== Municipal council ===
The municipal council (Heradsstyre) of Hålandsdal Municipality was made up of 13 representatives that were elected to four year terms. The tables below show the historical composition of the council by political party.

Hålandsdal heradsstyre 1959–1963
Party name (in Nynorsk)	Number of representatives
Local List(s) (Lokale lister)	13
Total number of members:	13
Note: On 1 January 1964, Hålandsdal Municipality became part of Fusa Municipality.

Hålandsdal heradsstyre 1955–1959
Party name (in Nynorsk)	Number of representatives
Local List(s) (Lokale lister)	13
Total number of members:	13

Hålandsdal heradsstyre 1951–1955
Party name (in Nynorsk)	Number of representatives
Local List(s) (Lokale lister)	12
Total number of members:	12

Hålandsdal heradsstyre 1947–1951
Party name (in Nynorsk)	Number of representatives
Local List(s) (Lokale lister)	12
Total number of members:	12

Hålandsdal heradsstyre 1945–1947
Party name (in Nynorsk)	Number of representatives
Local List(s) (Lokale lister)	12
Total number of members:	12

Hålandsdal heradsstyre 1937–1941*
Party name (in Nynorsk)	Number of representatives
Labour Party (Arbeidarpartiet)	5
Local List(s) (Lokale lister)	7
Total number of members:	12
Note: Due to the German occupation of Norway during World War II, no elections were held for new municipal councils until after the war ended in 1945.

=== Mayors ===
The mayor (Nynorsk: ordførar) of Hålandsdal Municipality was the political leader of the municipality and the chairperson of the municipal council. The following people held this position:

- 1903–1904: Erik Holdhus
- 1905–1907: Hans Bjørndal
- 1908–1910: Erik Holdhus
- 1911–1913: Hans Bjørndal
- 1914–1916: Anders Hansen Bolstad
- 1917–1931: Erik Holdhus
- 1931–1947: Ingebrigt Eide (Bp)
- 1947–1951: Mathias Tombre
- 1951–1963: Ingebrigt Eide (Sp)

== See also ==
- List of former municipalities of Norway
