= Warp-weighted loom =

Ancient form of loom

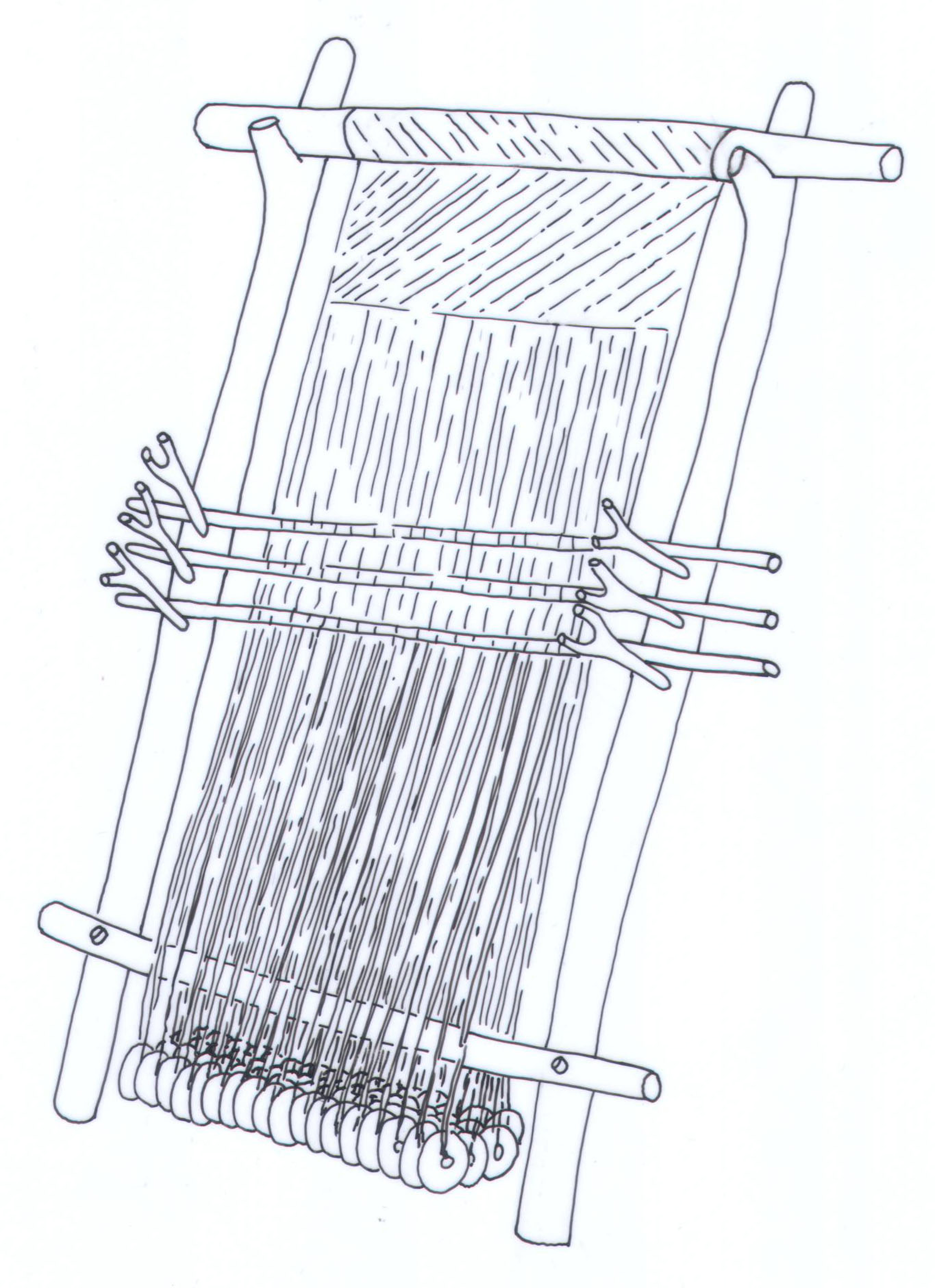
Three heddle-rods for weaving twill

The warp-weighted loom is a simple and ancient form of loom in which the warp yarns hang freely from a bar, which is supported by upright poles which can be placed at a convenient slant against a wall. Bundles of warp threads are tied to hanging weights called loom weights which keep the threads taut.

Evidence of the warp-weighted loom appears in the Neolithic period in central Europe. It is depicted in artifacts of Bronze Age in Greece. Loom weights from the Bronze Age were excavated in Miletos, a Greek city in Anatolia. The warp-weighted looms were common throughout Europe, remaining in use in some areas of Scandinavia into the modern era.

In Sápmi, the warp-weighted loom is a living cultural heritage today, particularly in use for weaving of traditional blankets among the Sea Sami.

The warp tension needed on a loom is roughly proportional to yarn diameter, and loom weights must be positioned in an even, level row, with all the threads hanging nearly straight down, for smooth weaving. This means that the shape of a loom weight limits a loom to certain thread counts, and the mass of the loom weight is related to the yarn used. This means that loom weights can be used to calculate the density and other properties of the fabric made on them.

== History ==
The warp-weighted loom may have originated in the Neolithic period. The earliest evidence of warp-weighted looms comes from sites belonging to the Starčevo culture in modern Serbia and Hungary from late Neolithic sites in Switzerland. This loom was used in Ancient Greece, and spread north and west throughout Europe thereafter. It was extensively used in the north among Scandinavian people. For yet unknown reasons, the warp-weighted loom diminished in popularity and disappeared from common use. The arrival of mechanized looms and industry may have contributed to this decline. It remained in use longest in Scandinavia; researcher Marta Hoffman found warp-weighted looms still in use in the 1950s in Hålandsdal Municipality in Hordaland county and among the Sami of Norway and Finland. Today, the warp-weighted loom is used as a hobby and in historic preservation societies.

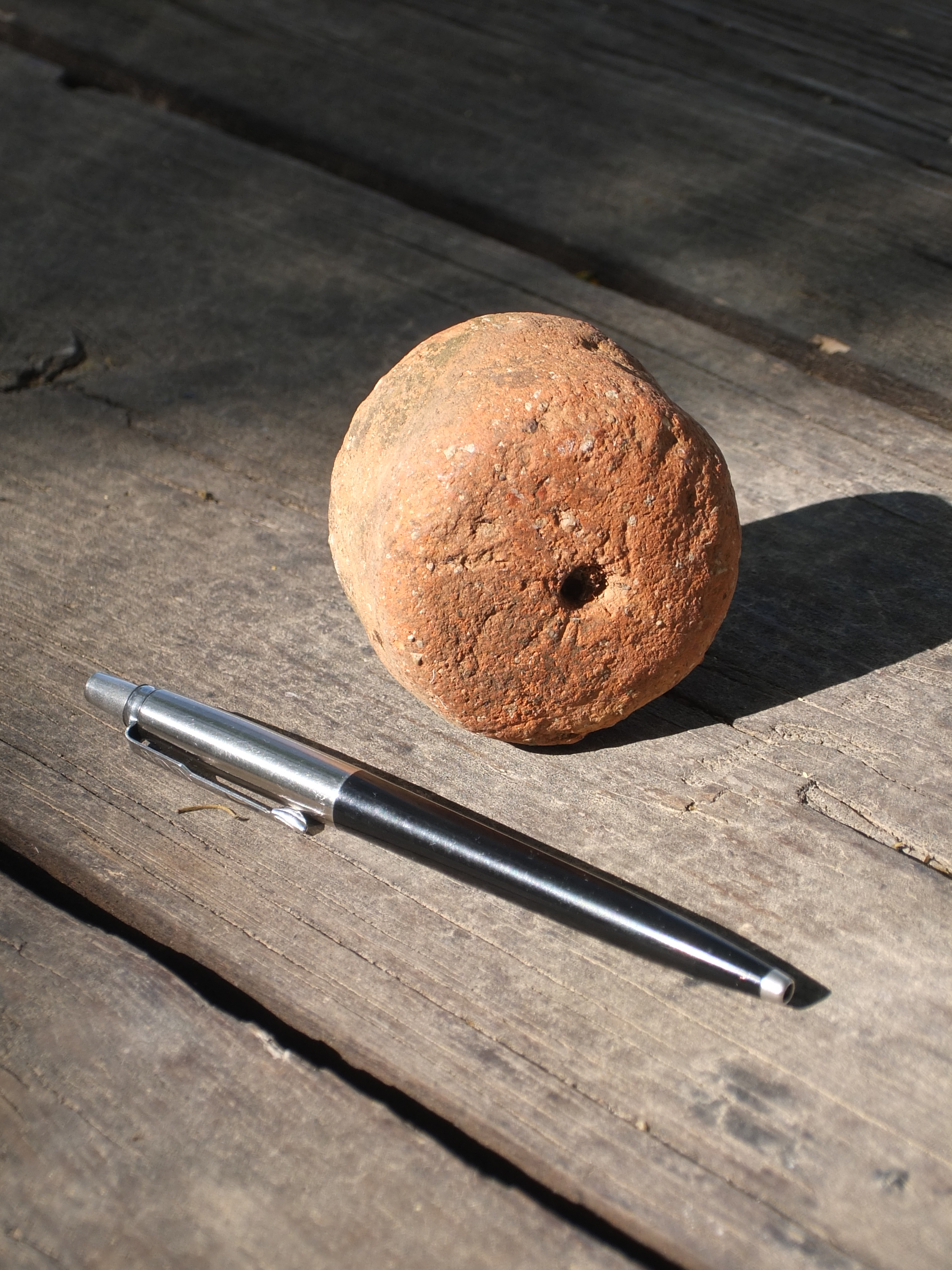
Loom weight discovered in Bersabe, Galilee

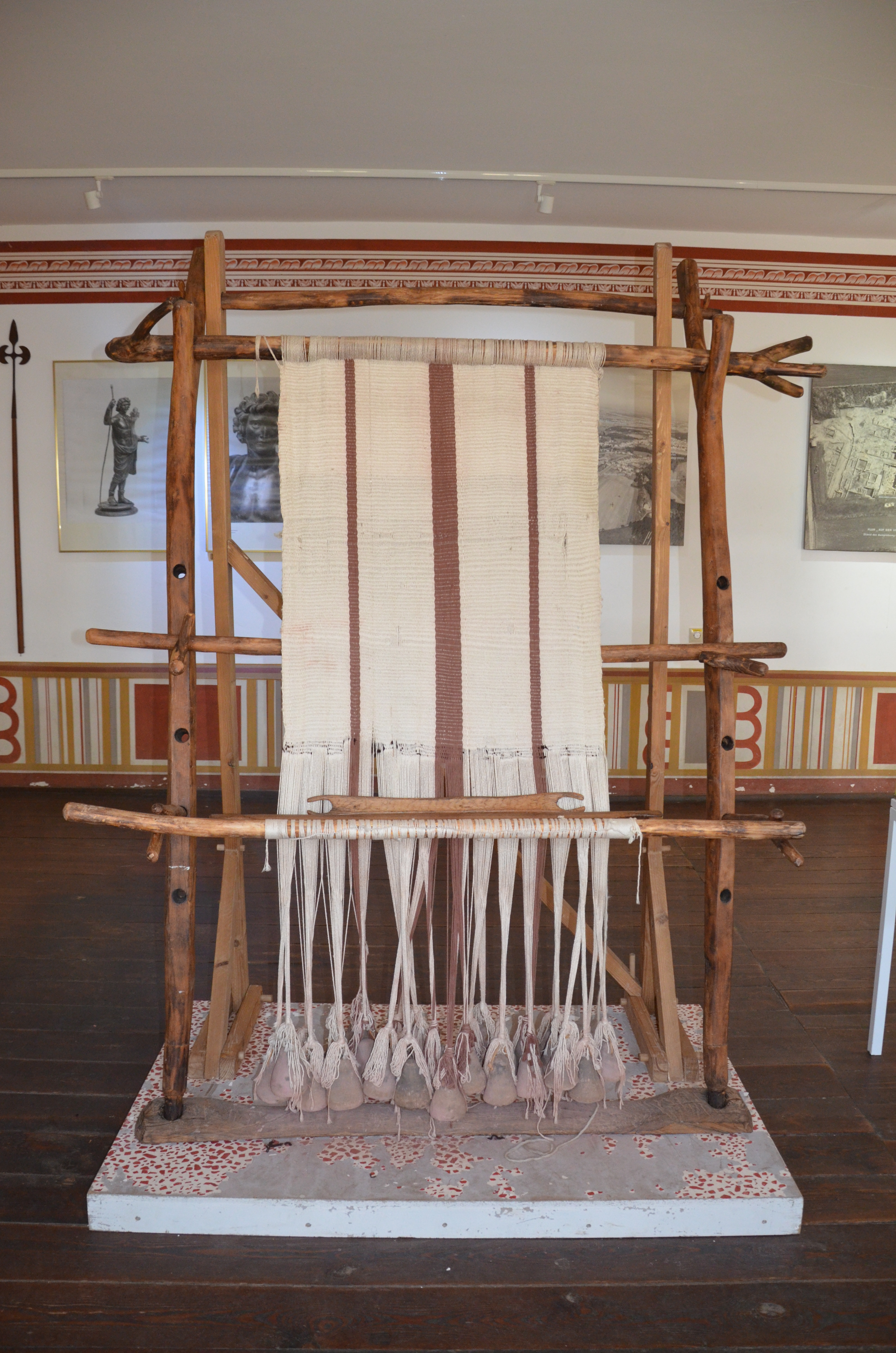
Ancient Roman loom replica

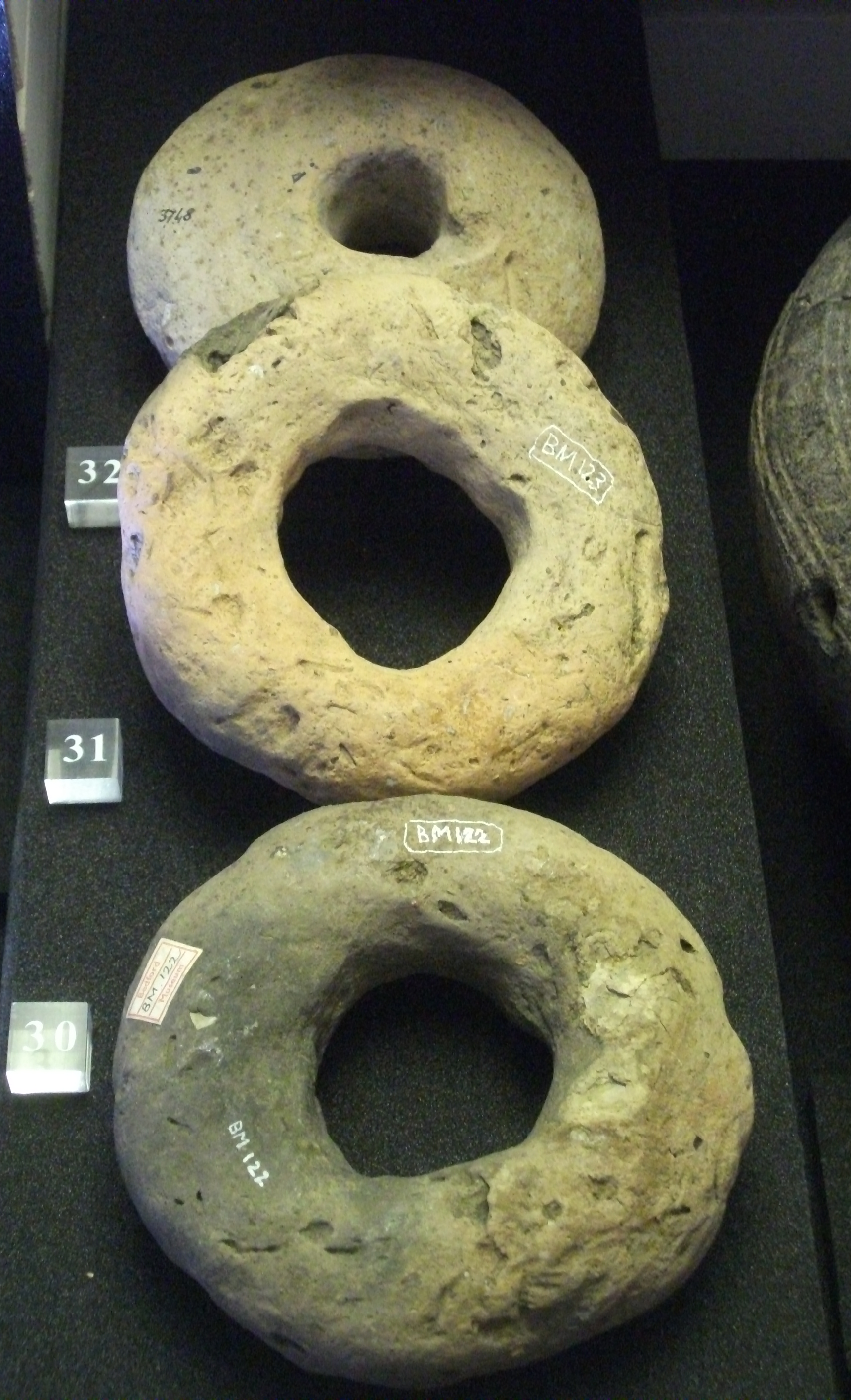
Saxon loomweights

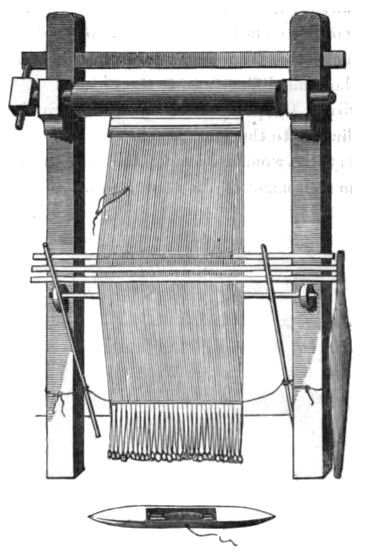
Icelandic warp-weighted loom

== Use ==
Elements of a warp-weighted loom
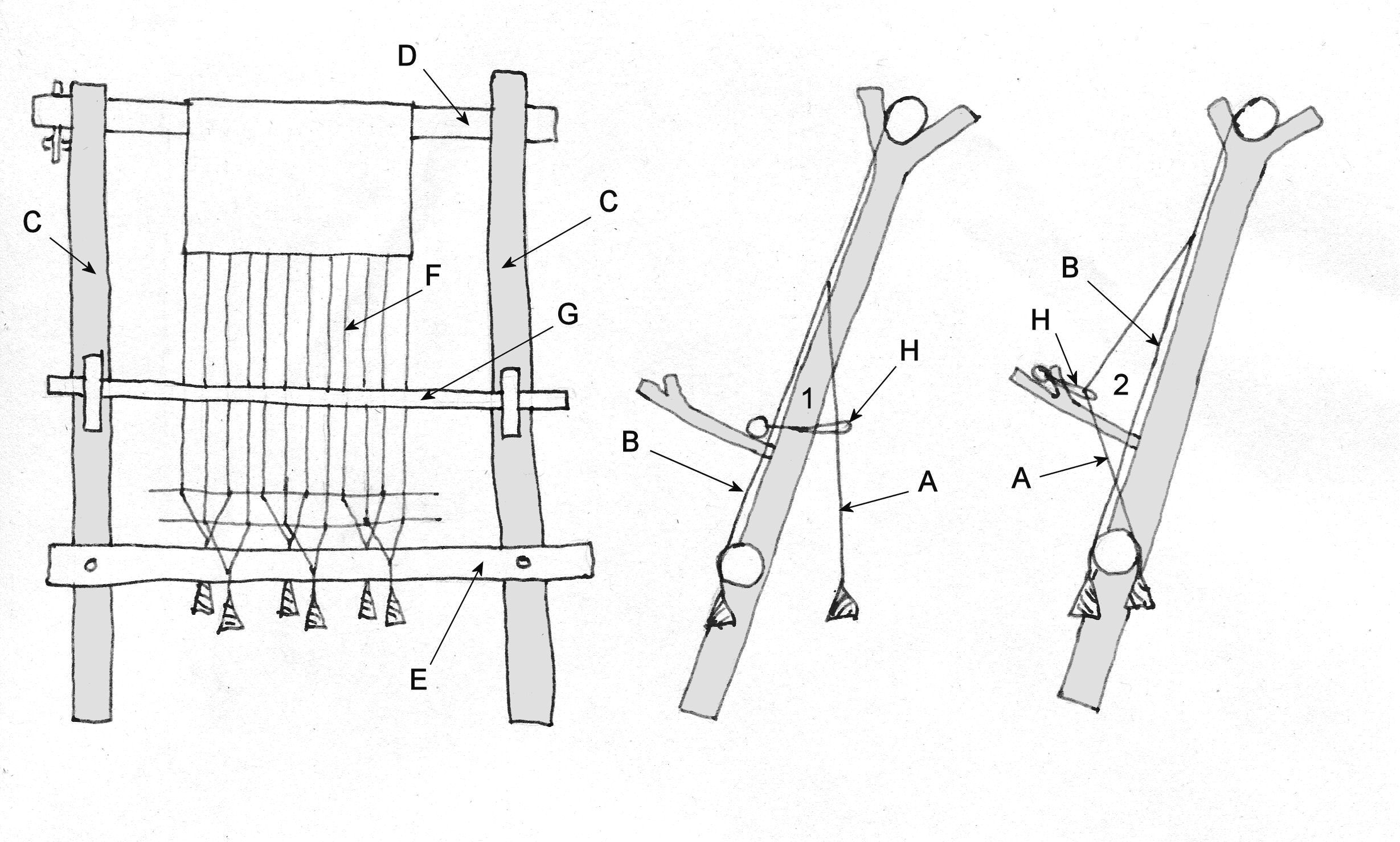

A warp-weighted loom has two upright posts (C); they support a horizontal beam (D), which is cylindrical so that the finished cloth can be rolled around it, allowing the loom to be used to weave a piece of cloth taller than the loom, and preserving an ergonomic working height. The warp threads (F, and A and B) hang from the beam and rest against the shed rod (E). The heddle-bar (G) is tied to some of the warp threads (A, but not B), using loops of string called leashes (H). So when the heddle rod is pulled out and placed in the forked sticks protruding from the posts (not lettered, no technical term given in citation), the shed (1) is replaced by the counter-shed (2). By passing the weft through the shed and the counter-shed, alternately, cloth is woven.

The warp-weighted loom is used in a near-vertical position, and the fabric is woven from the top of the loom toward the ground. This allows the weaver to walk back-and-forth while working, so that wider cloth can be woven than is practical on a ground loom. On Ancient Greek vase paintings, two weavers, most often women, are shown working side-by-side on the warp-weighted loom. This is unusual because most other looms require a resting position of standing or sitting. According to Artemidorus, if one dreams of a warp-weighted loom it means an upcoming journey. If one dreams of any other type of loom, one should expect rest.

Additionally, extra warp thread can be wound around the weights. When a weaver has reached the bottom of the available warp, the completed section can be rolled around the top beam, and additional lengths of warp threads can be unwound from the weights to continue. This frees the weaver from vertical size constraints.

== Gallery ==
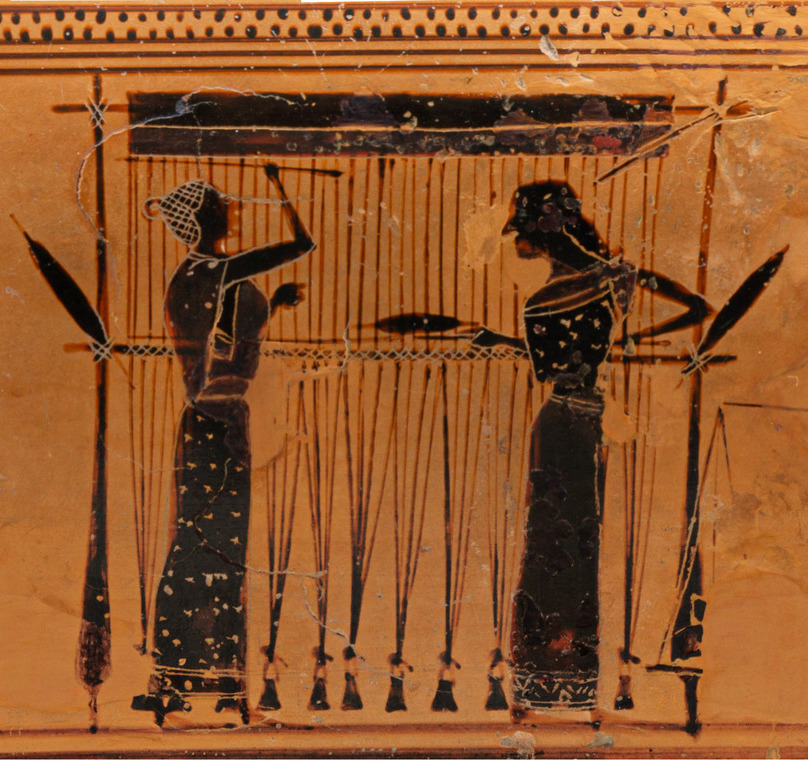
The weaver with her arm behind her back is passing (not throwing) the shuttle through the shed; the weaver reaching upwards is battening the previous weft yarn, beating it against the fell (cloth already woven). Greek urn, ca. 550–530 BCE.

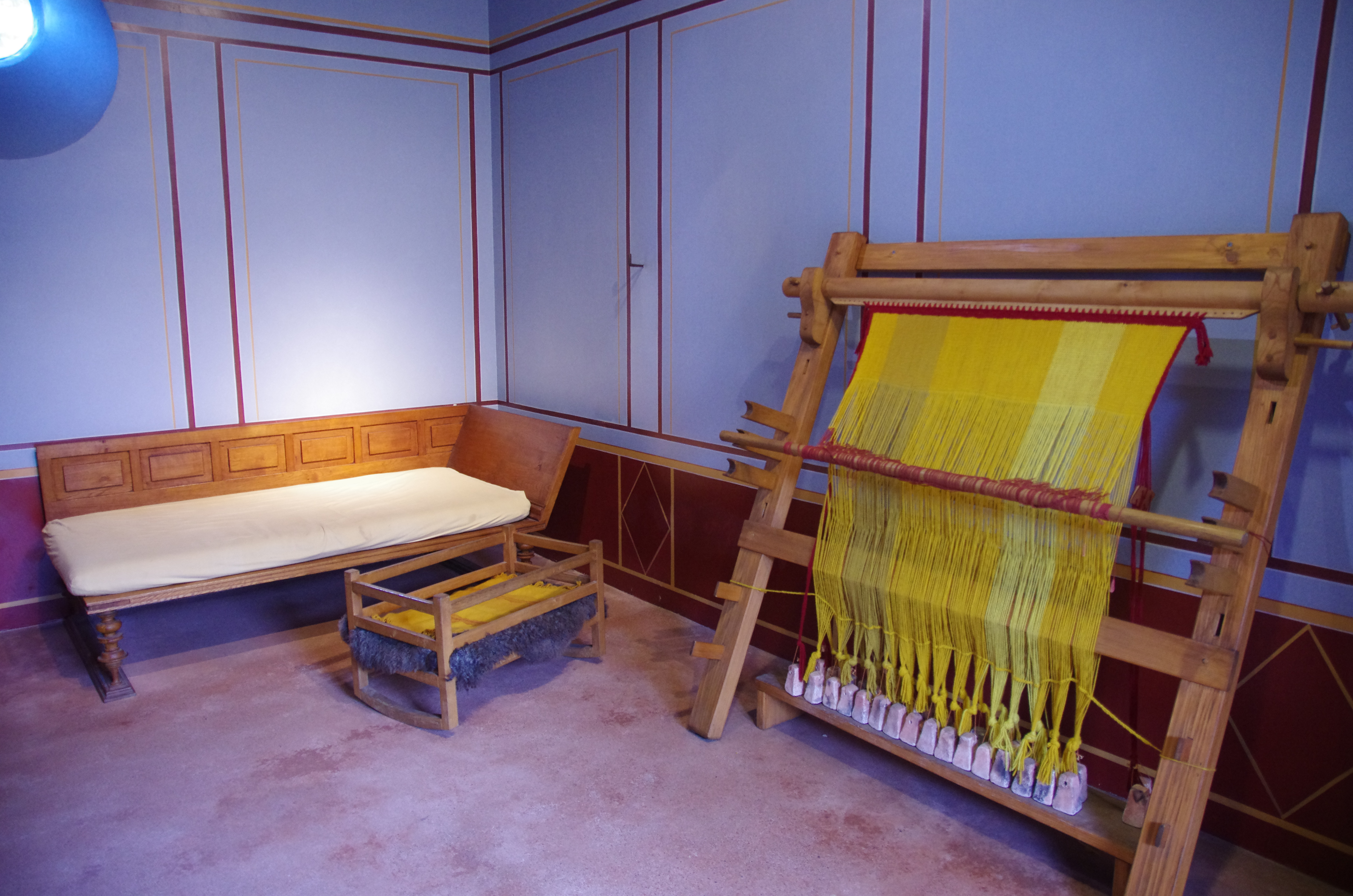
Reconstruction of a Roman loom. Warps have been chainstitched together; weights are resting on a low bench.

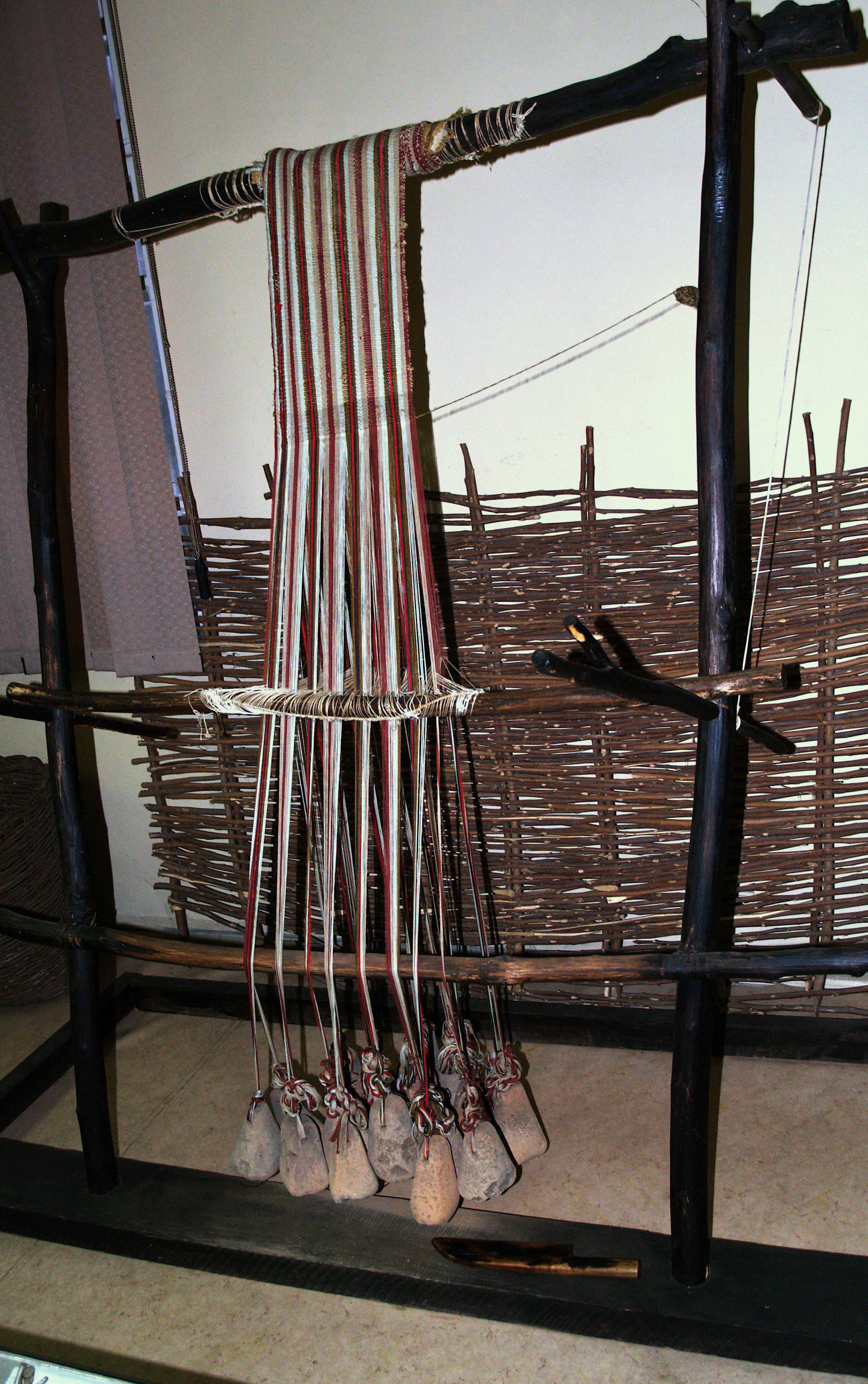
Reconstruction of a vertical neolithic loom with genuine loom weights and string heddles, on display at the National Museum of Textile Industry in Sliven, Bulgaria

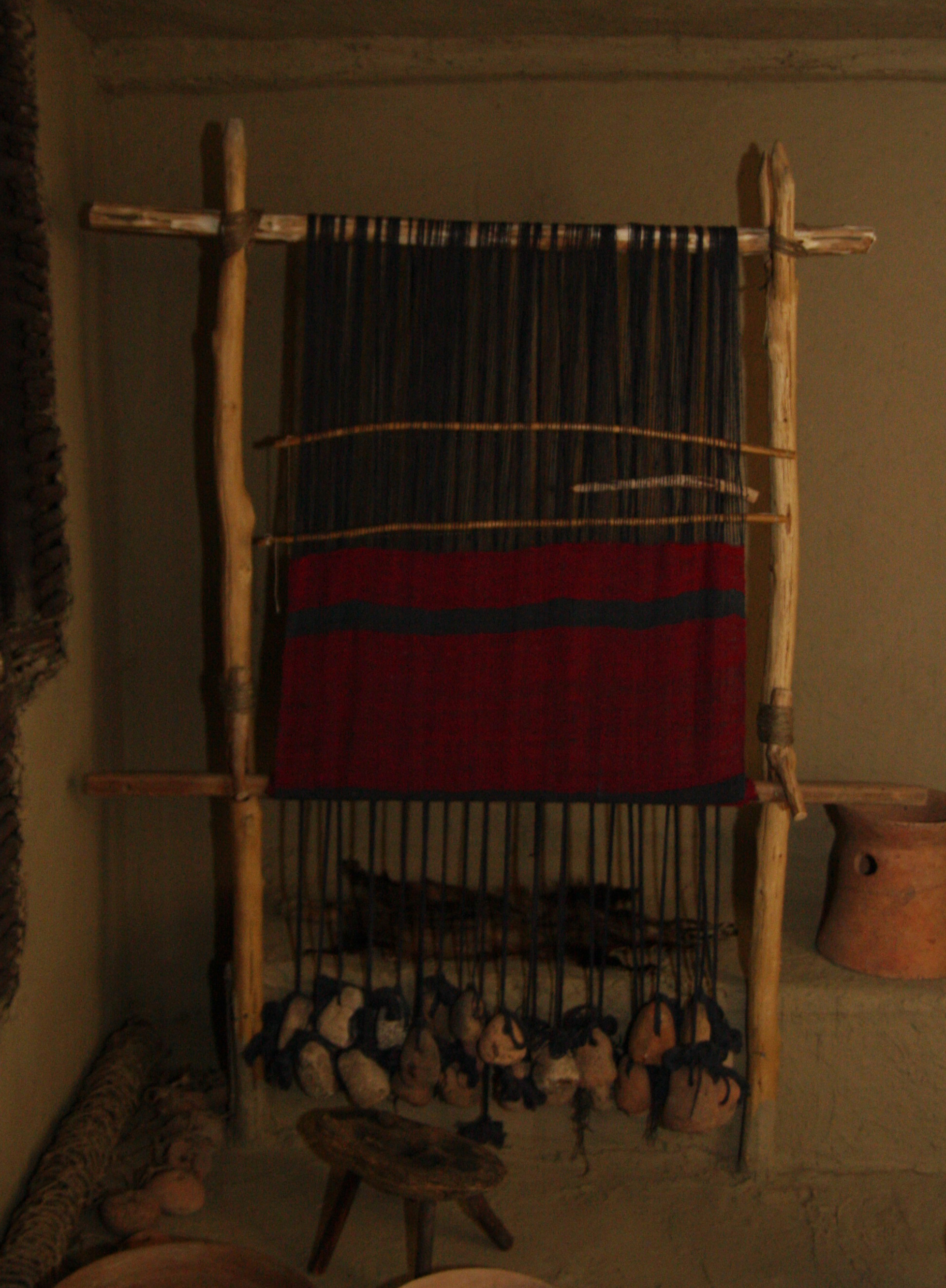
Reconstruction of a vertical neolithic loom with shed bar without string heddles, on display at Piatra Neamț Museum

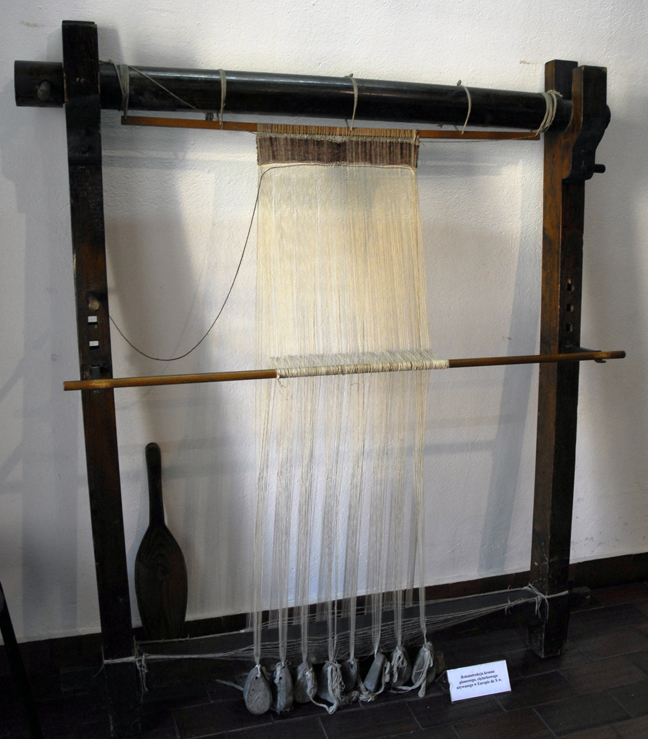
Warp weighted loom with string heddles in the Central Textile Museum in Łódź, Poland

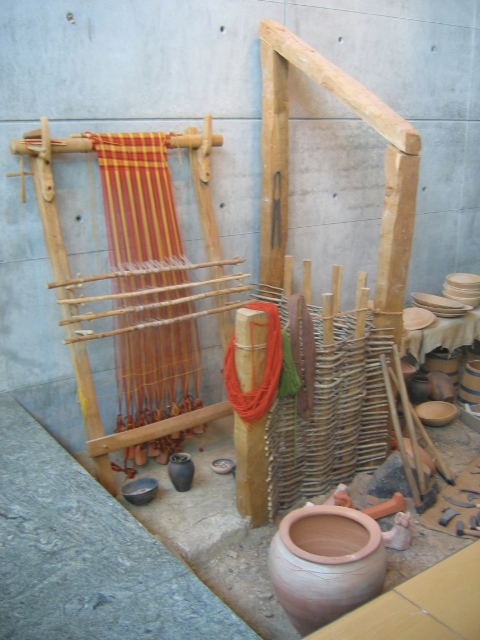
Loom with four heddle-rods. Mechanism for stopping the beam from rotating during weaving is also clearly shown. Reconstruction of a Gaulish loom.

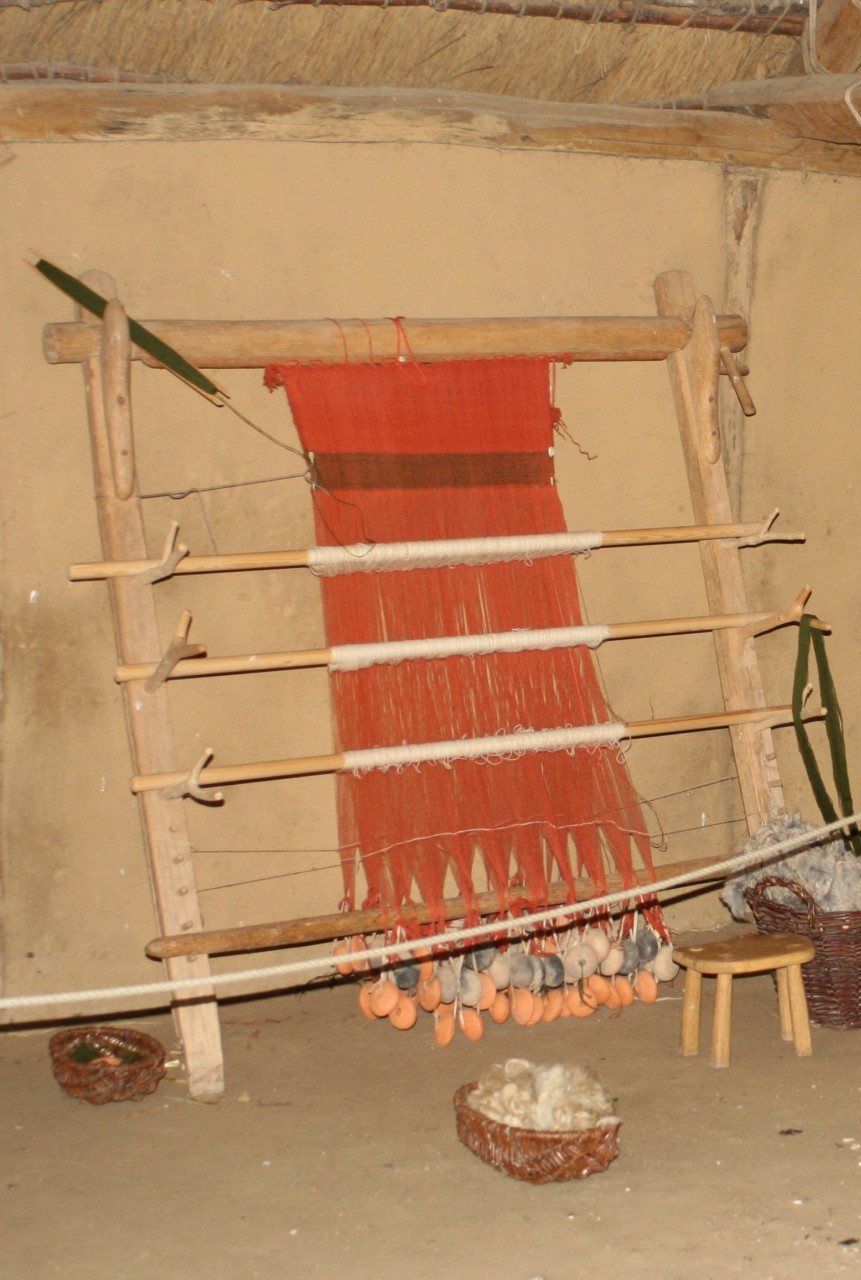
Three heddle-rods.
