= Øvre Hålandsdal =

Village in Bjørnafjorden Municipality, Norway

- Village
- Interactive map of Øvre Hålandsdal
- Coordinates: 60.25096°N 5.92485°E
- Country: Norway
- Region: Western Norway
- County: Vestland
- District: Midhordland
- Municipality: Bjørnafjorden Municipality
- Elevation: 17 m (56 ft)
- Time zone: UTC+01:00 (CET)
  - Summer (DST): UTC+02:00 (CEST)
- Post Code: 5640 Eikelandsosen

Øvre Hålandsdal is a rural village (and valley) in Bjørnafjorden Municipality in Vestland county, Norway. The village is located in the Øvre Hålandsdalen valley, about 7 kilometres (4.3 mi) to the northeast of the village of Holdhus. The lake Skogseidvatnet lies at the south end of the rural village. In 2019, the village area had 135 residents who lived along the valley floor going north from the lake shore.
