= Jarle Pedersen =

Norwegian speed skater

Jarle Pedersen (born 15 June 1955) is a retired Norwegian speed skater and the retired coach of the Norwegian speed skating team. He is from Kåfjord in Alta Municipality in Finnmark county, but now resides in Bjørnafjorden Municipality to the south of Bergen.

Pedersen competed in the 1980 Winter Olympics in Lake Placid and finished 6th on the 500 m. On 25 November 2009 he became the head coach of the Norwegian Speed skating team following Peter Mueller. Johann Olav Koss became his assistant. He has been a speed skating coach in the local team Fana IL. In Fana he was the coach for his son Sverre Lunde Pedersen. They are being reunited on the national team since the son joined the team before the 2009/2010 winter season. Pedersen is educated as a Physical therapist and had that role in the Norwegian Olympic team under the 1998 Winter Olympics in Nagano.
