= Holdhus =

Village in Bjørnafjorden Municipality, Norway

- Village
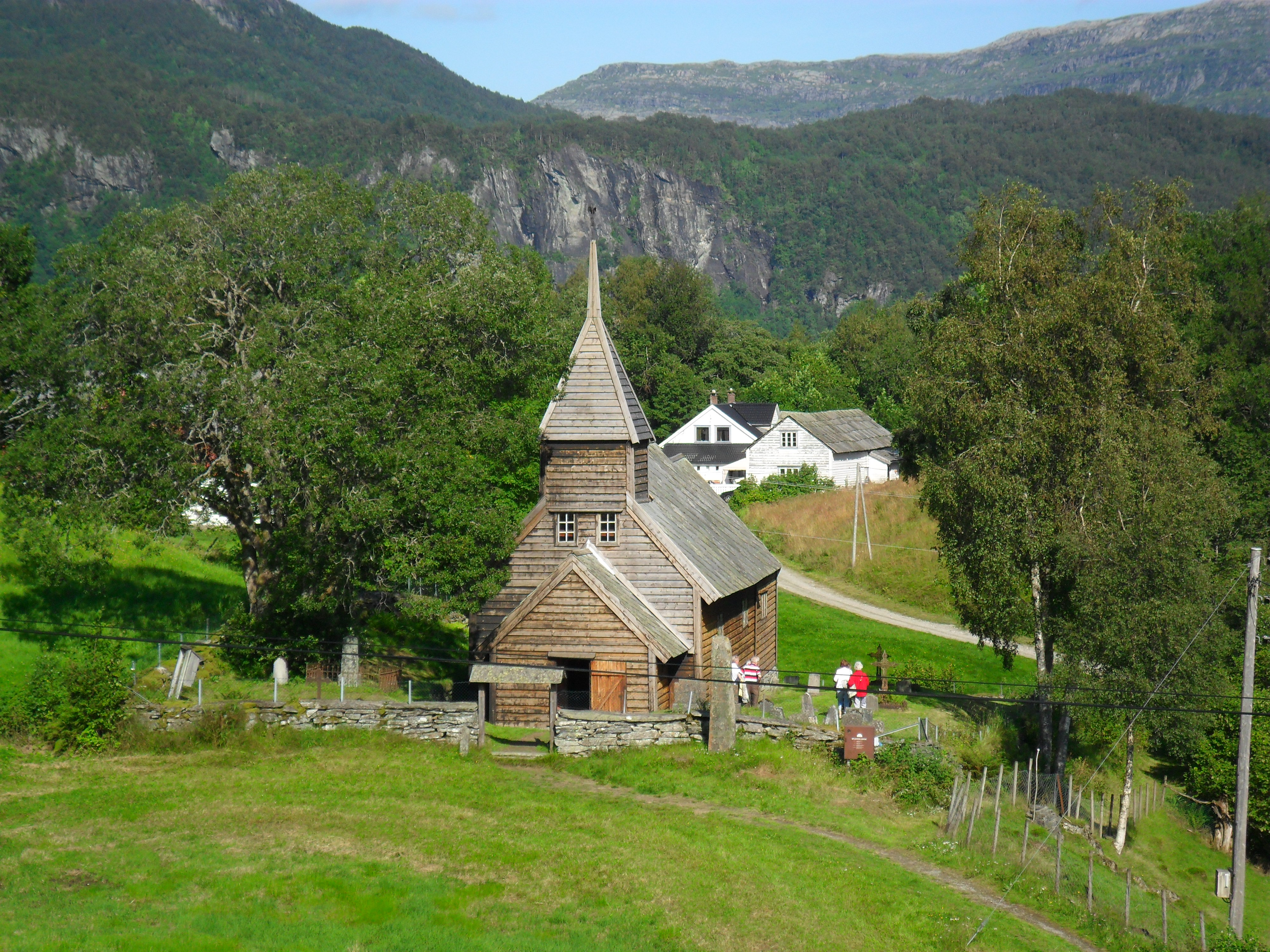
- View of the village area
- Interactive map of Holdhus
- Coordinates: 60.23871°N 5.83203°E
- Country: Norway
- Region: Western Norway
- County: Vestland
- District: Midhordland
- Municipality: Bjørnafjorden Municipality
- Elevation: 134 m (440 ft)
- Time zone: UTC+01:00 (CET)
  - Summer (DST): UTC+02:00 (CEST)
- Post Code: 5640 Eikelandsosen

Holdhus is a village in Bjørnafjorden Municipality in Vestland county, Norway. The village is located about 4.5 kilometres (2.8 mi) east of the village of Eikelandsosen. The village is located near several large lakes including Gjønavatnet, Henangervatnet, and Skogseidvatnet.

== History ==
The village was the administrative centre of the old Hålandsdal Municipality which existed from 1903 until 1964. The historic Holdhus Church is located in the village.
