= Hålandsdal Church =

Church in Vestland, Norway

- Hålandsdal kyrkje
- Hålandsdal Church
- 60°13′47″N 5°52′19″E
- Location: Bjørnafjorden, Vestland
- Country: Norway
- Denomination: Church of Norway
- Churchmanship: Evangelical Lutheran

History
- Status: Parish church
- Founded: 1890
- Consecrated: 1890

Architecture
- Functional status: Active
- Architect: Karl Hansen Askeland
- Architectural type: Long church
- Style: Neo-Gothic
- Completed: 1890 (136 years ago)

Specifications
- Capacity: 250
- Materials: Wood

Administration
- Diocese: Bjørgvin bispedømme
- Deanery: Fana prosti
- Parish: Fusa
- Norwegian Cultural Heritage Site
- Type: Church
- Status: Not protected
- ID: 84708

Hålandsdal Church (Norwegian: Hålandsdal kyrkje) is a parish church of the Church of Norway in Bjørnafjorden Municipality in Vestland county, Norway. It is located in the village of Eide at the southern end of the Øvre Hålandsdalen valley, just east of the village of Holdhus. It is one of the churches for the Fusa parish which is part of the Fana prosti (deanery) in the Diocese of Bjørgvin. The white, wooden church was built in a long church design in 1890 using plans drawn up by the architect Karl Hansen Askeland. The church seats about 250 people.

== History ==
This church was built to replace the Old Hålandsdal Church located about 3 kilometres (1.9 mi) to the northwest of this site. Karl Askeland was hired as the architect and lead builder. The building had a nave that measures about 13.2 by 9.2 metres (43 ft × 30 ft) and a choir that measures about 5.9 by 6.6 metres (19 ft × 22 ft). This new church was completed in 1890 and was consecrate on 20 November 1890 by the Bishop Fredrik Hvoslef. After this church was opened, the Old Hålandsdal Church was renamed Holdhus Church and it was closed and later converted to a museum. The old church served the Hålandsdalen valley from the 14th century until 1890 when the new church was opened. The new Hålandsdal Church was remodeled in 1978 and the church porch under the tower was enlarged to add bathrooms and storage as well as a larger entrance area.

== See also ==
- List of churches in Bjørgvin
