= Holmefjord =

Village in Bjørnafjorden Municipality, Norway

- Village
- Interactive map of Holmefjord
- Coordinates: 60.28934°N 5.66913°E
- Country: Norway
- Region: Western Norway
- County: Vestland
- District: Midhordland
- Municipality: Bjørnafjorden Municipality
- Elevation: 75 m (246 ft)
- Time zone: UTC+01:00 (CET)
  - Summer (DST): UTC+02:00 (CEST)
- Post Code: 5642 Holmefjord

Holmefjord is a village in Bjørnafjorden Municipality in Vestland county, Norway. It is located near the shore along the Samnangerfjorden about 7.5 kilometres (4.7 mi) northwest of the village of Eikelandsosen.

Holmefjord is a small typical western Norwegian village. In 1960, there were 2 general stores, a dairy, and a local bakery. Due to a contemporary transportation system and lifestyle (as of 2006), most of that is gone and there is only one general store left. There are a few small industrial factories that use wood as raw materials, producing wooden beams as well as other things. The traditional handicraft of making barrels out of pine is now almost extinct. These barrels were used for storage of herring as well as exported to Canada and Iceland.

The village has a tradition (for about the last 100 years or so) of having a play every May 17. Most villagers have participated in the play over the years. On May 17, the villagers work together and make a lot of a popular local porridge, called raudravle, which is sold for the benefit of the community house, Bygdaheimen.
