= Gjønavatnet =

Lake in Vestland, Norway

- Gjønvatnet
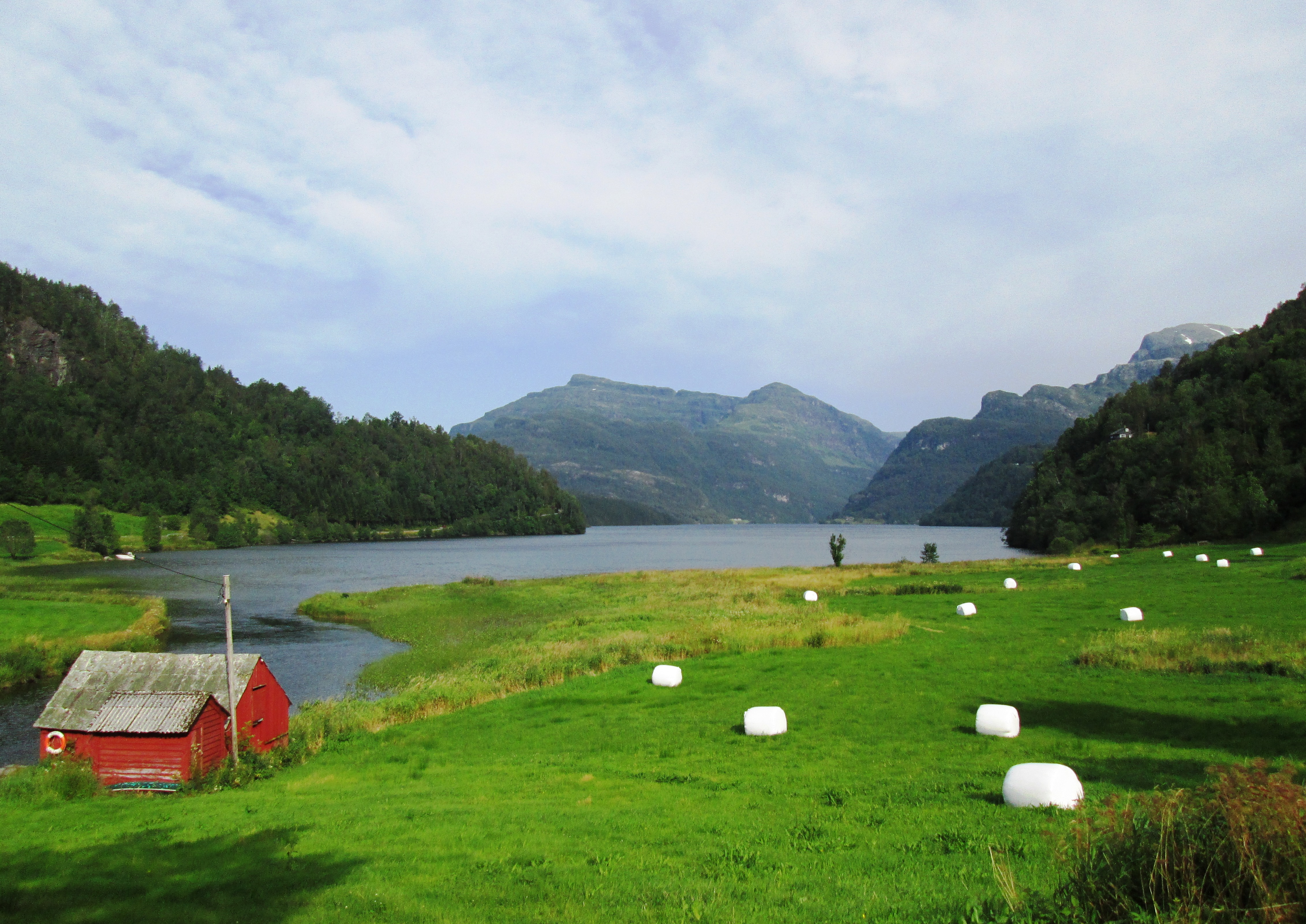
- Interactive map of Gjønavatnet
- Location: Bjørnafjorden Municipality, Vestland
- Coordinates: 60.25856°N 5.85065°E
- Primary outflows: Skogseidvatnet
- Basin countries: Norway
- Max. length: 6.4 kilometres (4.0 mi)
- Max. width: 950 metres (3,120 ft)
- Surface area: 2.86 km^{2} (1.10 sq mi)
- Shore length^{1}: 13.77 kilometres (8.56 mi)
- Surface elevation: 40 metres (130 ft)
- References: NVE
- ^{1} Shore length is not a well-defined measure.

Gjønavatnet is a lake in Bjørnafjorden Municipality in Vestland county, Norway. The 2.86-square-kilometre (1.10 sq mi) lake lies just east of the village of Holdhus and just north of the lake Skogseidvatnet.

== See also ==
- List of lakes in Norway
