= Sundvor Church =

Church in Vestland, Norway

- Sundvor kyrkje
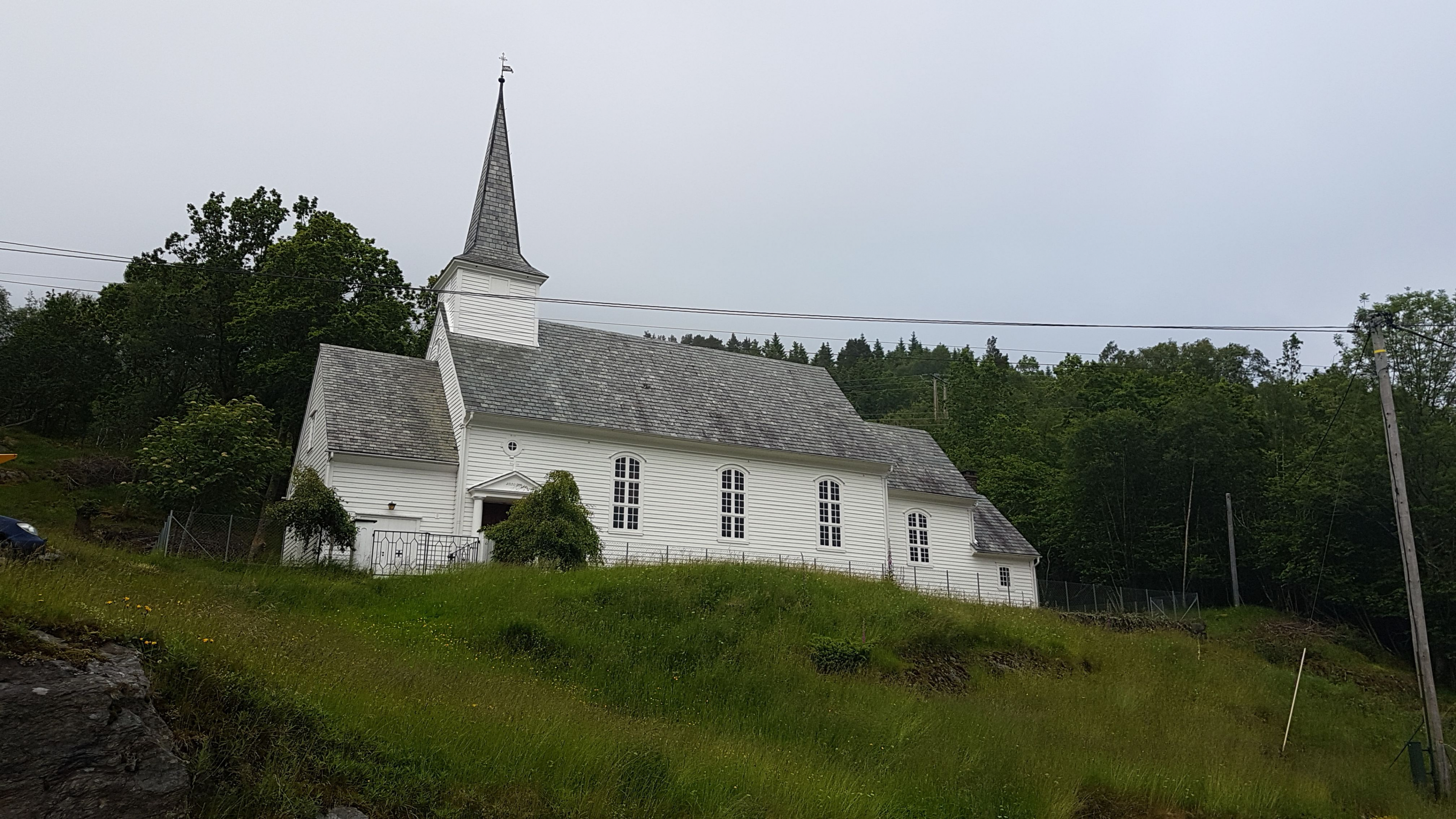
- View of the church
- Sundvor Church
- 60°04′25″N 5°45′23″E
- Location: Bjørnafjorden Municipality, Vestland
- Country: Norway
- Denomination: Church of Norway
- Churchmanship: Evangelical Lutheran

History
- Former name: Sundvor kapell
- Status: Parish church
- Founded: 1927
- Consecrated: 14 Oct 1927

Architecture
- Functional status: Active
- Architect: Erlend Tryti
- Architectural type: Long church
- Completed: 1927 (99 years ago)

Specifications
- Capacity: 228
- Materials: Wood

Administration
- Diocese: Bjørgvin bispedømme
- Deanery: Fana prosti
- Parish: Fusa
- Norwegian Cultural Heritage Site
- Type: Church
- Status: Listed
- ID: 85000

Sundvor Church (Norwegian: Sundvor kyrkje) is a parish church of the Church of Norway in Bjørnafjorden Municipality in Vestland county, Norway. It is located in the village of Sundvord, serving the far southern part of the municipality. It is one of the churches for the Fusa parish which is part of the Fana prosti (deanery) in the Diocese of Bjørgvin. The white, wooden church was built in a long church design in 1927 using plans drawn up by the architect Erlend Tryti. The church seats about 228 people.

== History ==
During the 1920s, planning for a new annex chapel in Sundvor began. Erlend Tryti was hired to design the new chapel. The white, wooden chapel was built in 1927. It was consecrated on 14 October 1927. In 1980, the building was enlarged to the west to add bathroom space and storage. In 2000, the chapel was upgraded in status to a "parish church".

== Media gallery ==
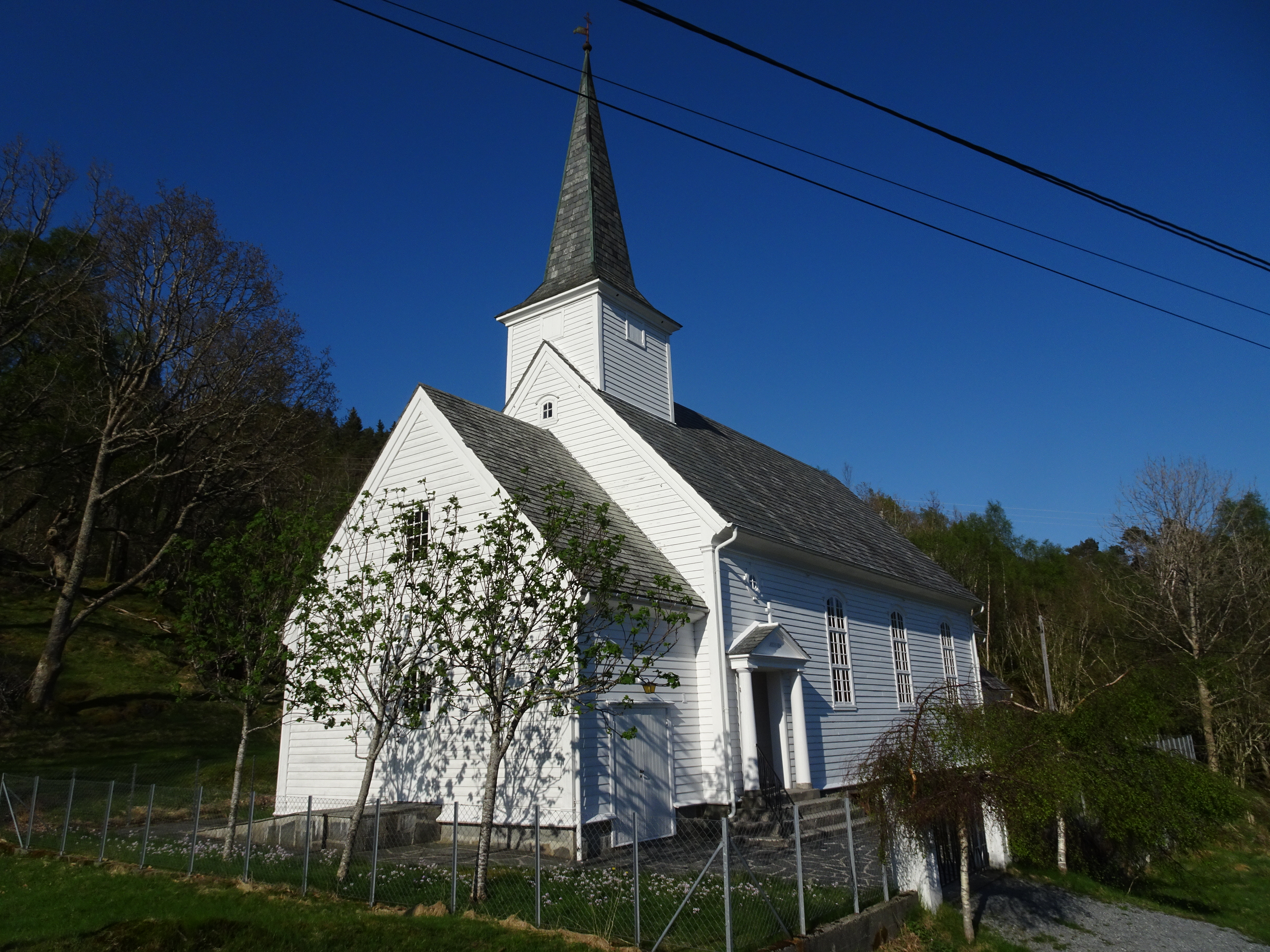

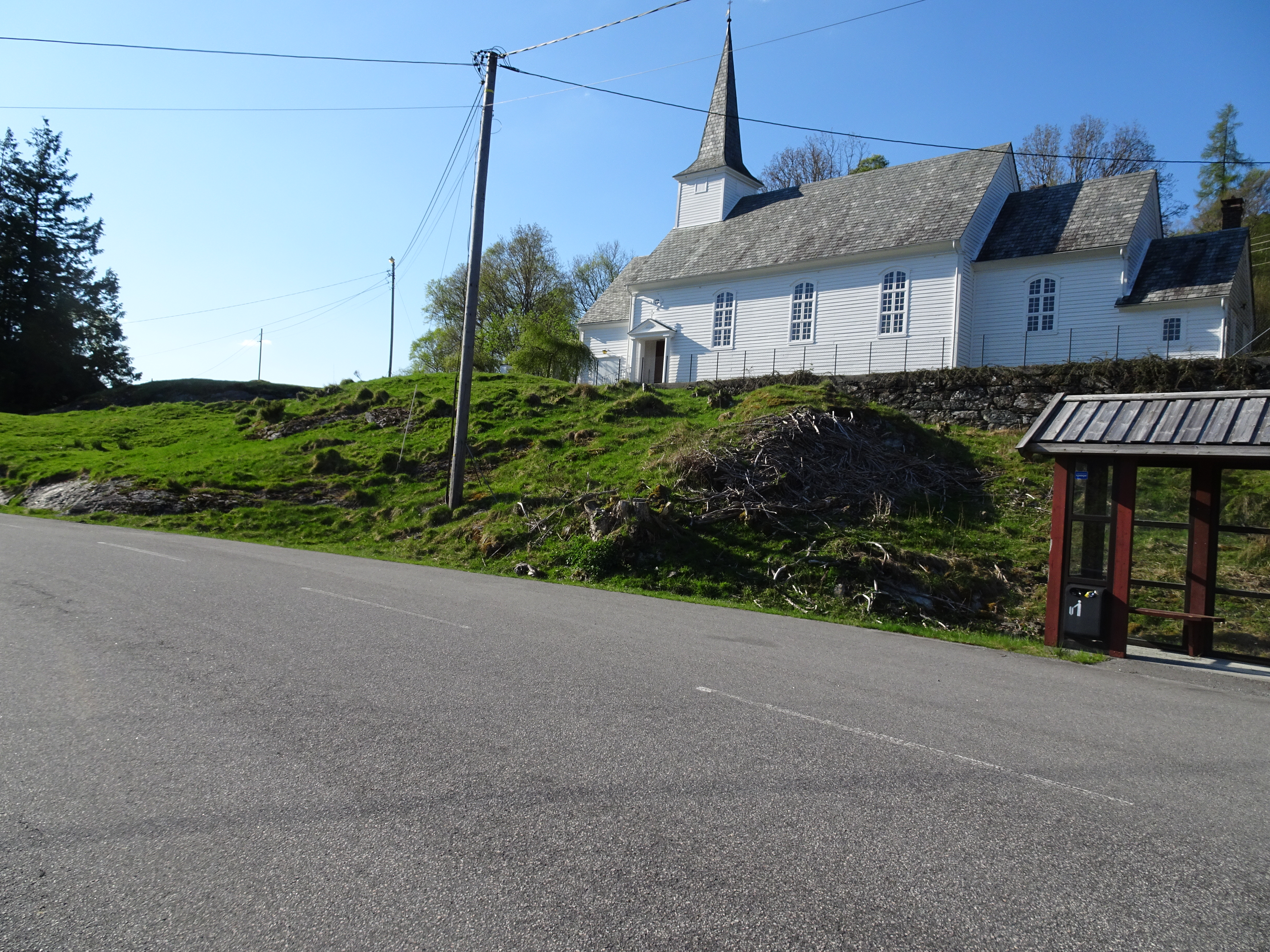

== See also ==
- List of churches in Bjørgvin
