= Henangervatnet =

Lake in Bjørnafjorden, Norway

- Interactive map of Henangervatnet
- Location: Bjørnafjorden Municipality, Vestland
- Coordinates: 60.19994°N 5.79897°E
- Primary inflows: Skogseidvatnet
- Primary outflows: Bjørnafjorden
- Basin countries: Norway
- Max. length: 4.8 kilometres (3.0 mi)
- Max. width: 2 kilometres (1.2 mi)
- Surface area: 2.66 km^{2} (1.03 sq mi)
- Shore length^{1}: 12.65 kilometres (7.86 mi)
- Surface elevation: 12 metres (39 ft)
- References: NVE
- ^{1} Shore length is not a well-defined measure.

Henangervatnet is a lake in Bjørnafjorden Municipality in Vestland county, Norway. The 2.66-square-kilometre (1.03 sq mi) lake lies about 5 kilometres (3.1 mi) south of the village of Eikelandsosen. The lake lies between the lake Skogseidvatnet and the Sævareidfjorden, an arm off the main Bjørnafjorden.

== See also ==
- List of lakes in Norway
