= Skogseidvatnet =

Lake in Vestland, Norway

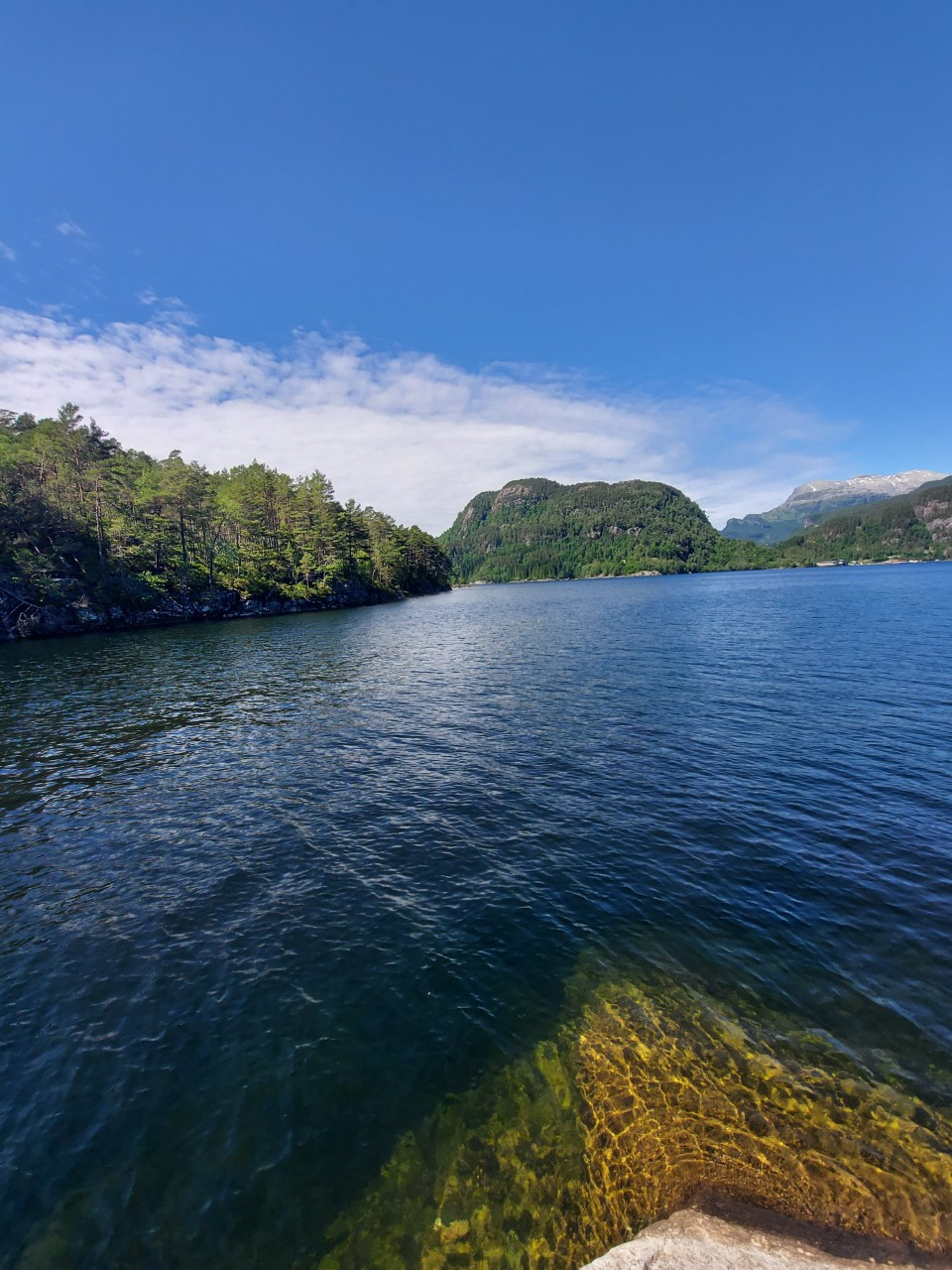
- Interactive map of Skogseidvatnet
- Location: Bjørnafjorden Municipality, Vestland
- Coordinates: 60.21825°N 5.8716°E
- Primary inflows: Orraelva, Gjønavatnet
- Primary outflows: Henangervatnet
- Basin countries: Norway
- Max. length: 5.8 kilometres (3.6 mi)
- Max. width: 2.5 kilometres (1.6 mi)
- Surface area: 5.3 km^{2} (2.0 sq mi)
- Shore length^{1}: 18.72 kilometres (11.63 mi)
- Surface elevation: 13 metres (43 ft)
- References: NVE
- ^{1} Shore length is not a well-defined measure.

Skogseidvatnet is a lake in Bjørnafjorden Municipality in Vestland county, Norway. The 5.3-square-kilometre (2.0 sq mi) lake lies at the southern end of the Øvre Hålandsdalen valley, about 7 kilometres (4.3 mi) east of the village of Eikelandsosen. Water from the river Orraelva and the lake Gjønavatnet flow into the lake, and then it flows out into the lake Henangervatnet before flowing out into the fjord.

== See also ==
- List of lakes in Norway
