= Midhordland =

Midhordland Midthordland (unofficial)
- District
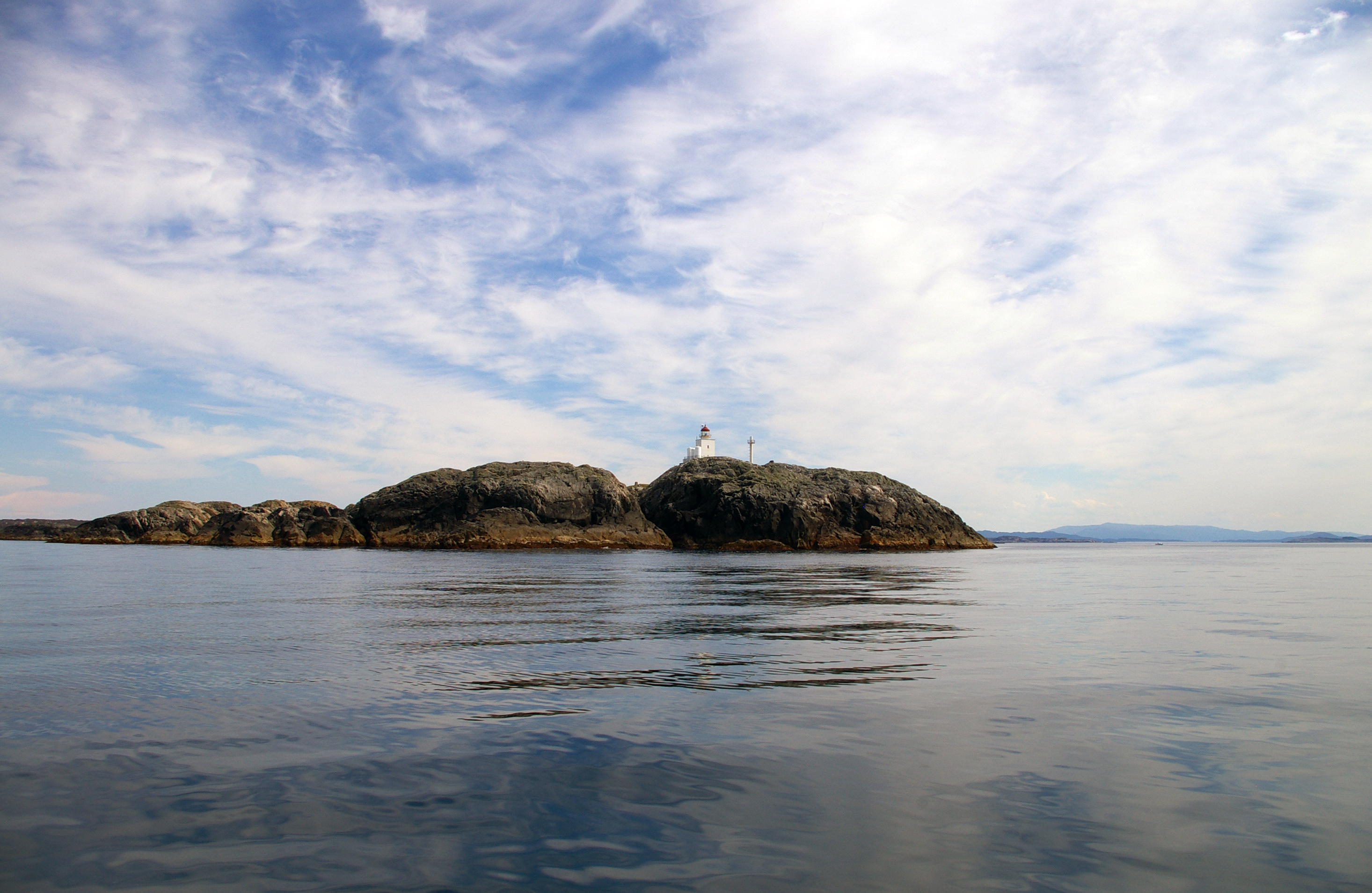
- Marstein lighthouse

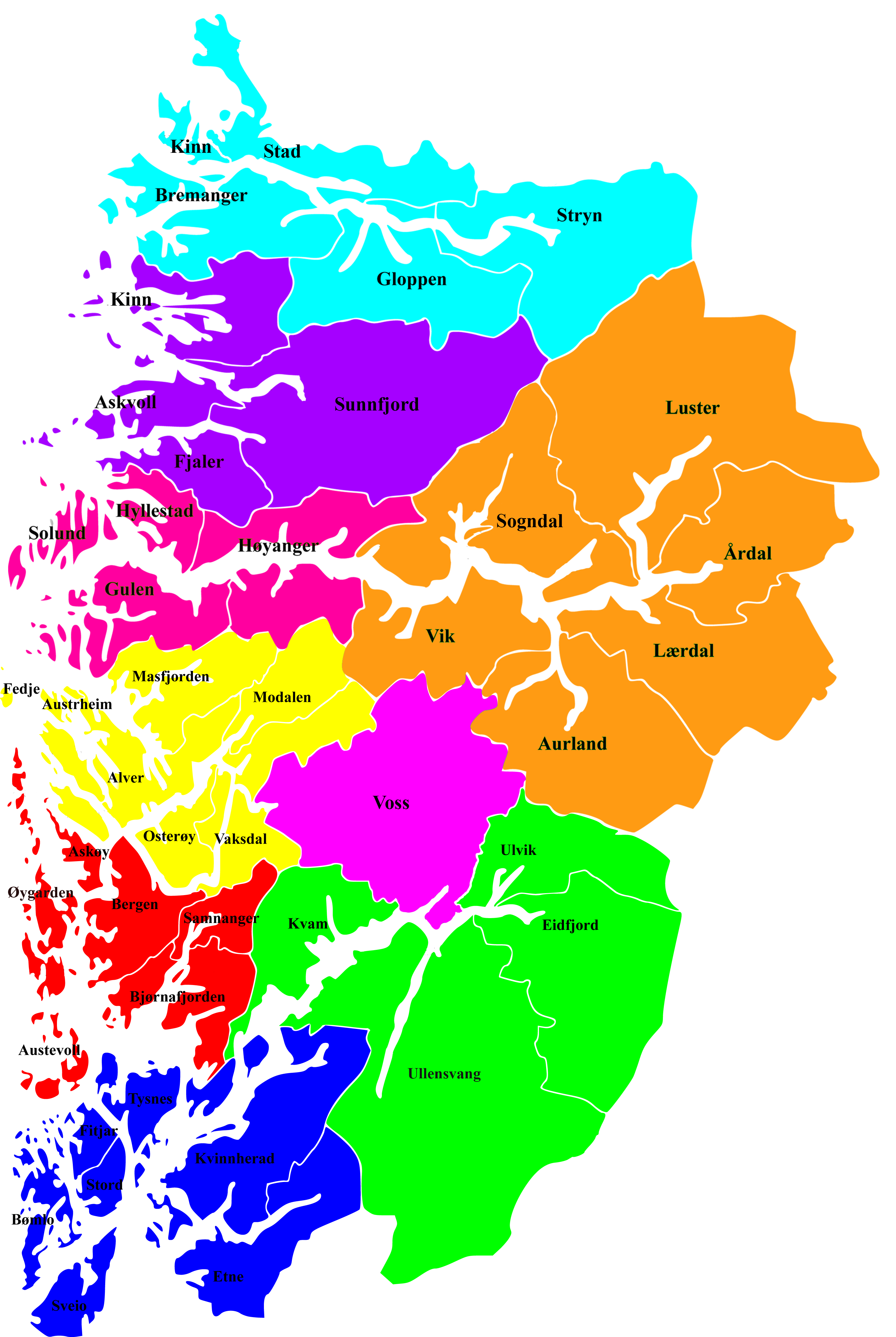
- Map of Districts and Municipalities in Vestland Nordfjord Sunnfjord Indre Sogn Ytre Sogn Nordhordland Midhordland Sunnhordland Hardanger Voss
- Coordinates: 60°17′N 05°12′E
- Country: Norway
- County: Vestland
- Region: Vestlandet
- Commercial Center: Bergen

Area
  - Total: 1,785 km^{2} (689 sq mi)

Population (2021)
  - Total: 386 988
  - Density: 0.216/km^{2} (0.560/sq mi)

Midhordland is a traditional district in the Vestlandet region of Norway. It consists of the central-west portion of the old Hordaland county (now part of Vestland county), mostly including the islands and coastal fjord areas surrounding (and including) the Bergen Peninsula. It includes the city of Bergen and the surrounding municipalities of Askøy, Austevoll, Bjørnafjorden, Samnanger, and Øygarden. The region is dominated by its largest city, Bergen, which is also the second largest city in the country.

There are no administrative functions for this district, it is simply a cultural and historical area. Until 2014, the Church of Norway had a deanery called Midhordland prosti, but that has since been dissolved and its churches transferred to other neighboring deaneries.

== Municipalities of Midhordland ==
Arms	Name	Inhabitants	Area	Language form
	Askøy Municipality	29,553	101	Neutral
	Austevoll Municipality	5,283	117	Nynorsk
	Bergen Municipality	286,930	465	Neutral
	Bjørnafjorden Municipality	25,213	517	Nynorsk
	Samnanger Municipality	2,501	269	Nynorsk
	Øygarden Municipality	39,032	315	Nynorsk
Midhordland		388,412	1,784	Nynorsk, Neutral

== Geography ==
- Tallest mountain is the 1,299.1-metre (4,262 ft) tall Tveitakvitingen in Bjørnafjorden Municipality
- Largest lake by area is the 5.3-square-kilometre (2.0 sq mi) Skogseidvatnet in Bjørnafjorden Municipality
- Largest island by area is the 178.6-square-kilometre (69.0 sq mi) Sotra in Øygarden Municipality
