= Bjørnafjorden Municipality =

Municipality in Vestland, Norway

Bjørnafjorden Municipality Bjørnafjorden kommune
- Municipality
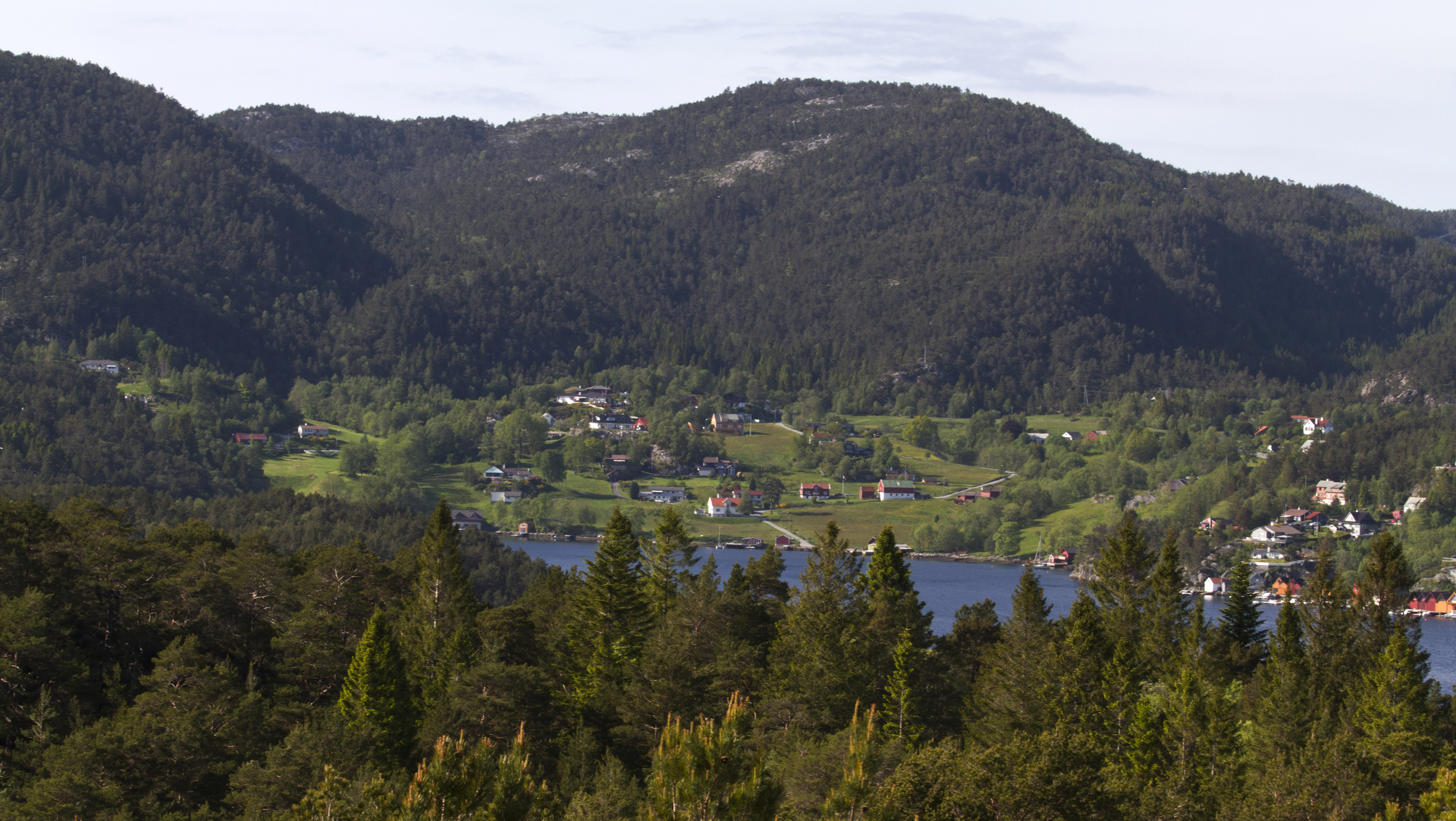
- View of Os in Bjørnafjorden

- Coat of arms

- Vestland within Norway

- Bjørnafjorden within Vestland
- Coordinates: 60.19547°N 5.62225°E
- Country: Norway
- County: Vestland
- District: Midhordland
- Established: 1 Jan 2020
  - Preceded by: Fusa and Os
- Administrative centre: Osøyro

Government
  - Mayor (2023): Terje Søviknes (FrP)

Area
  - Total: 517.40 km^{2} (199.77 sq mi)
  - Land: 487.22 km^{2} (188.12 sq mi)
  - Water: 30.18 km^{2} (11.65 sq mi) 5.8%
  - Rank: #204 in Norway
- Highest elevation: 1,298.86 m (4,261.4 ft)

Population (2025)
  - Total: 26,342
  - Rank: #46 in Norway
  - Density: 50.9/km^{2} (132/sq mi)
  - Change (10 years): ▲ +15.9%
- Demonym: Bjørnafjording

Official language
  - Norwegian form: Nynorsk
- Time zone: UTC+01:00 (CET)
  - Summer (DST): UTC+02:00 (CEST)
- ISO 3166 code: NO-4624
- Website: Official website

Bjørnafjorden is a municipality in Vestland county, Norway. It is located in the Midhordland region of the county. The administrative centre of Bjørnafjorden is the village of Osøyro. Other villages in the municipality include Eikelandsosen, Fusa, Hagavik, Haljem, Holdhus, Holmefjord, Strandvik, Sundvor, Syfteland, Søre Øyane, Søvik, and Vinnes.

The 517.4-square-kilometre (199.8 sq mi) municipality is the 204th largest by area out of the 357 municipalities in Norway. Bjørnafjorden Municipality is the 46th most populous municipality in Norway with a population of 26,342. The municipality's population density is 50.9 inhabitants per square kilometre (132/sq mi) and its population has increased by 15.9% over the previous 10-year period.

== General information ==
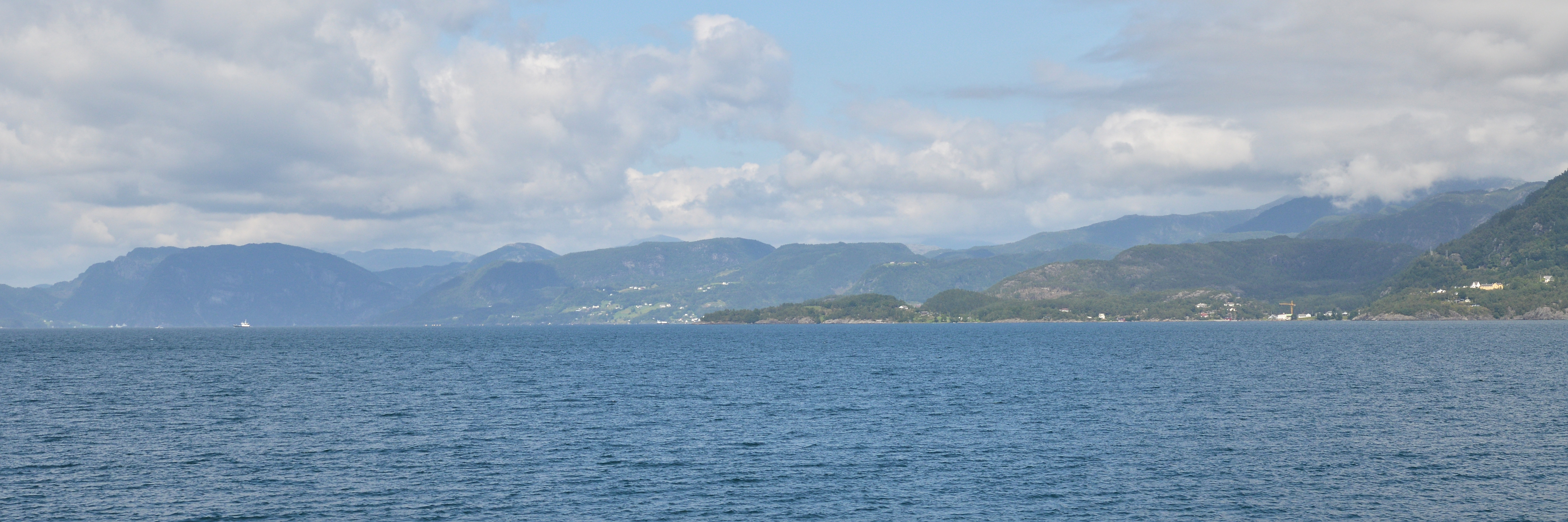
View of Bjørnafjorden

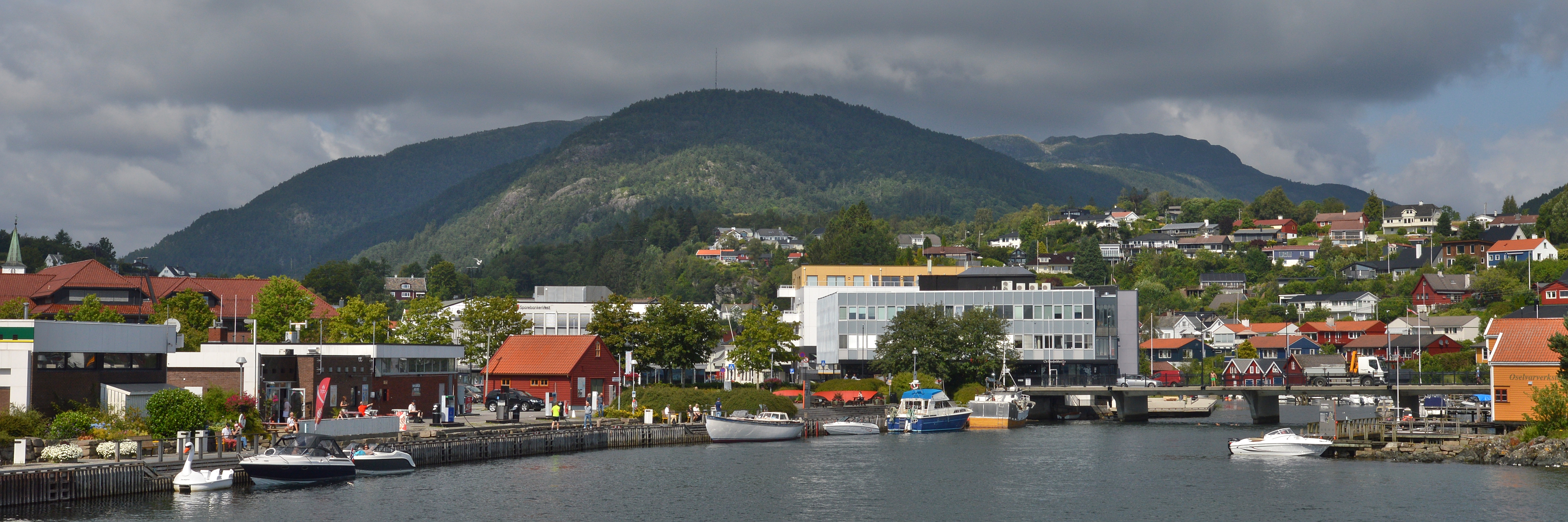
View of Osøyro

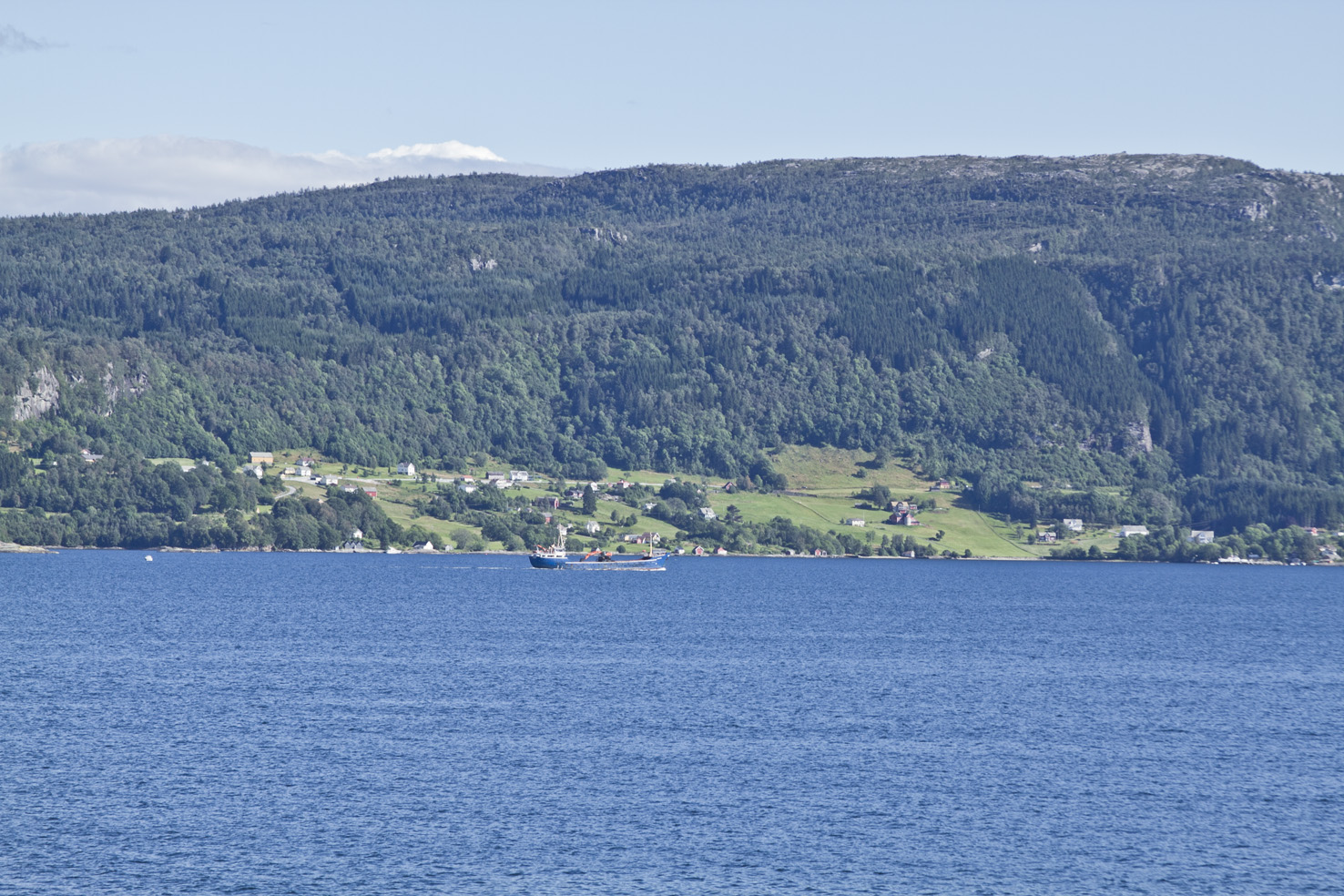
View of Fusa

The municipality was established on 1 January 2020 when Os Municipality and Fusa Municipality were merged. Historically, these 2 predecessor municipalities were part of the old Hordaland county. On 1 January 2020, the new municipality became a part of the newly-formed Vestland county (after Hordaland and Sogn og Fjordane counties were merged).

=== Name ===
The municipality is named after the Bjørnafjorden, a local fjord which is a central geographic feature of the municipality. The first element is bjørn which means "bear". The last element is the definite form of fjord which means "fjord". Thus this is "the bear fjord".

=== Coat of arms ===
The coat of arms was adopted in 2019 for use starting on 1 January 2020 after a municipal merger took effect. The official blazon is "Azure, a boat's bow and two spirals issuant from each side Or". This means the arms have a blue field (background) and the charge is the bow of a boat and below that are two curved wave shapes. The charge has a tincture of Or which means it is commonly colored yellow, but if it is made out of metal, then gold is used. The boat and waves symbolize the water and the importance of the sea. The boat is designed to look like an oselvar, a traditional rowing boat made in the area. The curved wave designs also allude to the local rosemaling designs and the local Giant's kettles (geysers) in Koldal. The arms were designed by Johan D. Eide. The municipal flag has the same design as the coat of arms.

=== Churches ===
The Church of Norway has two parishes (sokn) within Bjørnafjorden Municipality. It is part of the Fana prosti (deanery) in the Diocese of Bjørgvin.

Churches in Bjørnafjorden Municipality
Parish (sokn)	Church name	Location of the church	Year built
Fusa	Fusa Church	Fusa	1961
Fusa	Holdhus Church	Holdhus	1726
Fusa	Hålandsdal Church	Eide, east of Holdhus	1890
Fusa	Strandvik Church	Strandvik	1857
Fusa	Sundvor Church	Sundvor	1927
Os	Os Church	Osøyro	1870
Os	Nore Neset Church	Hagavik	2000

== Geography ==
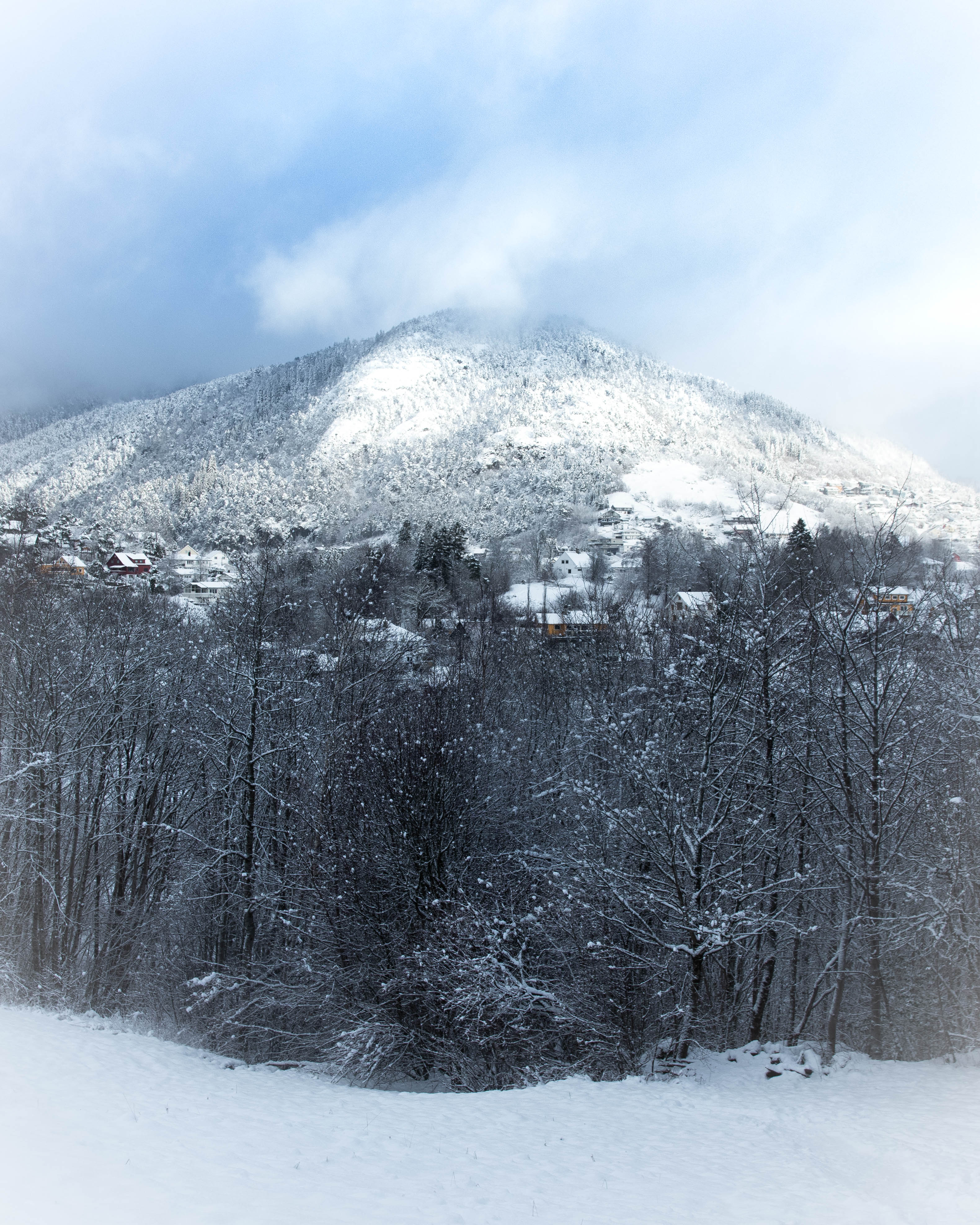
View of Borgafjellet mountain

The municipalities is located around the outer Bjørnafjorden, on both sides of the fjord. The highest point in the municipality is the 1,298.86-metre (4,261.4 ft) tall mountain Tveitakvitingen, a tripoint on the borders of Bjørnafjorden Municipality, Samnanger Municipality, and Kvam Municipality. Samnanger Municipality is located to the north, Kvam Municipality is located to the east, Kvinnherad Municipality is located to the southeast, Tysnes Municipality is located to the south, Austevoll Municipality is located to the southwest, and Bergen Municipality is located to the northwest.

== Government ==
Bjørnafjorden Municipality is responsible for primary education (through 10th grade), outpatient health services, senior citizen services, welfare and other social services, zoning, economic development, and municipal roads and utilities. The municipality is governed by a municipal council of directly elected representatives. The mayor is indirectly elected by a vote of the municipal council. The municipality is under the jurisdiction of the Hordaland District Court and the Gulating Court of Appeal.

=== Municipal council ===
The municipal council (Kommunestyre) of Bjørnafjorden Municipality is made up of 35 representatives that are elected to four-year terms. The tables below show the current and historical composition of the council by political party.

Bjørnafjorden kommunestyre 2023–2027
Party name (in Nynorsk)	Number of representatives
Labour Party (Arbeidarpartiet)	6
Progress Party (Framstegspartiet)	13
Green Party (Miljøpartiet Dei Grøne)	1
Conservative Party (Høgre)	6
Industry and Business Party (Industri‑ og Næringspartiet)	3
Christian Democratic Party (Kristeleg Folkeparti)	1
Centre Party (Senterpartiet)	2
Socialist Left Party (Sosialistisk Venstreparti)	2
Liberal Party (Venstre)	1
Total number of members:	35

Bjørnafjorden kommunestyre 2020–2023
Party name (in Nynorsk)	Number of representatives
Labour Party (Arbeidarpartiet)	8
Progress Party (Framstegspartiet)	12
Green Party (Miljøpartiet Dei Grøne)	3
Conservative Party (Høgre)	5
Christian Democratic Party (Kristeleg Folkeparti)	1
Centre Party (Senterpartiet)	5
Socialist Left Party (Sosialistisk Venstreparti)	1
Total number of members:	35

=== Mayors ===
The mayor (Nynorsk: ordførar) of Bjørnafjorden Municipality is the political leader of the municipality and the chairperson of the municipal council. The following people have held this position:

- 2020–2023: Trine Lindborg (Ap)
- 2023–present: Terje Søviknes (FrP)

== Notable people ==
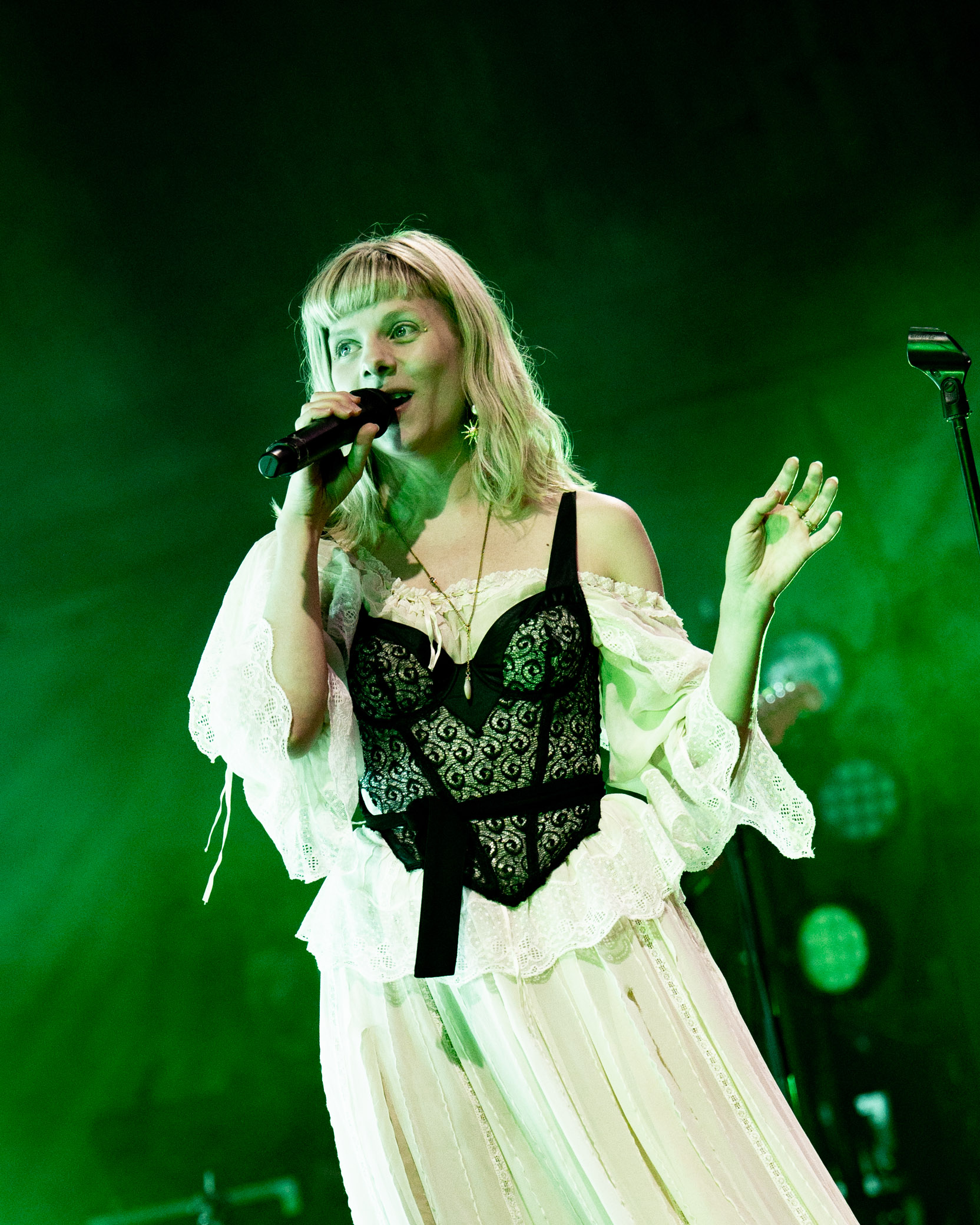
Aurora is one of the most internationally successful Norwegian artists

- Aurora (born 1996), a prominent singer, songwriter, and record producer. She grew up in the town of Drange in Lysefjord, Os
- Haldor Johan Hanson (1856 in Fusa – 1929), an American hymn writer, publisher, and author
- Nils Tveit (1876 in Os – 1949), a Norwegian politician and Mayor of Os from 1916 to 1940
- Ragnvald Indrebø (1891 in Os – 1984), a bishop of the Church of Norway's Diocese of Bjørgvin
- Mons Haukeland (1892 in Os – 1983), a gymnastics teacher and military officer
- Harald Slåttelid (1895 in Os – executed 1943), a trade unionist, newspaper editor, and communist resistance member
- Pål Sundvor (1920 in Fusa – 1992), a journalist, novelist, children's writer, poet, and playwright
- Trine Linborg (born 1965 in Os), a politician and mayor of Os
- Terje Søviknes (born 1969), a politician, former mayor of Os, and former Minister of Petroleum and Energy
- Olve Eikemo (born 1973), a black metal musician who grew up in Lysefjorden; stage name Abbath
- Maya Vik (born 1980), a singer, songwriter, and bass player who was brought up in Os
- Marius Neset (born 1985 in Os), a jazz saxophonist
- Ingrid Søfteland Neset (born 1992 in Os), an award-winning Norwegian classical flautist
- Boy Pablo (born 1998), a musician who grew up in Bergen and later in Os; real name Nicolas Muñoz.

=== Sport ===
- Kjersti Plätzer (born 1972 in Os), a race walker and twice silver medallist at the 2000 & 2008 Summer Olympics
- Egil Gjelland (born 1973), a former biathlete and team gold medallist at the 2002 Winter Olympics who lives in Skjelbreid in Fusa
- Liv Grete Skjelbreid (born 1974 in Fusa), a biathlete and silver medallist at the 2002 Winter Olympics
- Bjørn Dahl (born 1978 in Os), a retired footballer with almost 300 club caps
- Bjarte Haugsdal (born 1990 in Os), a football player with over 250 club caps
- Sverre Lunde Pedersen (born 1992 in Os), a speed skater, son of Jarle Pedersen, and two-time World Junior Champion
