= Mundheim =

Village in Kvam Municipality, Norway

- Village
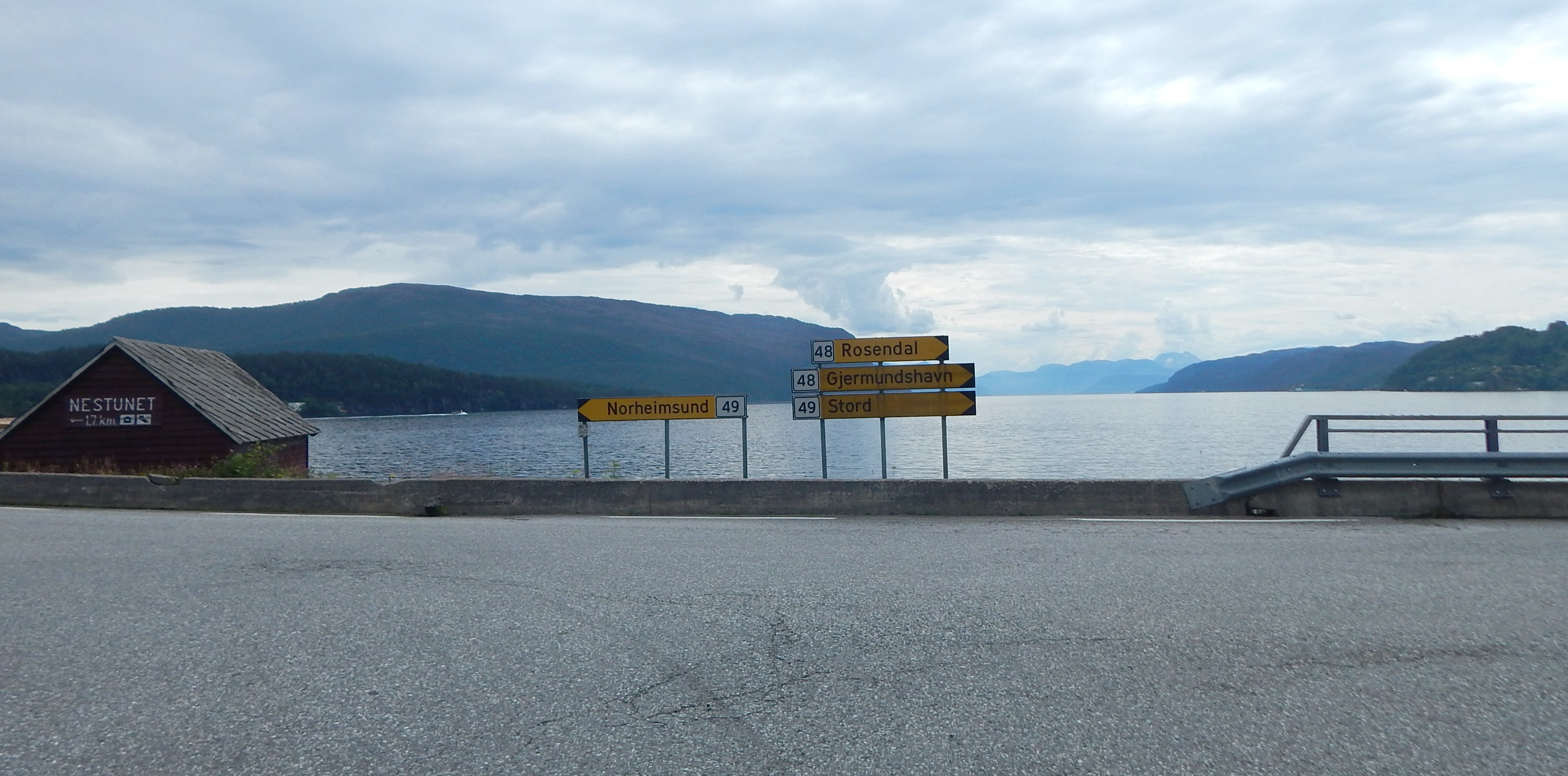
- View of the road junction along the fjord in Mundheim
- Interactive map of Mundheim
- Coordinates: 60.16473°N 5.90759°E
- Country: Norway
- Region: Western Norway
- County: Vestland
- District: Hardanger
- Municipality: Kvam Municipality
- Elevation: 7 m (23 ft)
- Time zone: UTC+01:00 (CET)
  - Summer (DST): UTC+02:00 (CEST)
- Post Code: 5632 Omastrand

Mundheim is a small village in Kvam Municipality in Vestland county, Norway. It is located in the southern part of the municipality, along the Hardangerfjorden, just northwest of the island of Varaldsøy. The village sits at the junction of two county roads (fylkesvei). Fv48 runs through Mundheim from Gjermundshamn (south in Kvinnherad Municipality) to Eikelandsosen (north in Bjørnafjorden Municipality) and Fv49 runs northeast to Ploganes and Norheimsund (both in Kvam Municipality).

== History ==
Historically, Mundheim was part of the parish of Strandebarm. When municipalities were established in Norway in 1838, Mundheim was part of Strandebarm Municipality. On 1 January 1902, the new Varaldsøy Municipality was created by separating it from Strandebarm Municipality. The new Varaldsøy Municipality consisted of the whole island of Varaldsøy as well as the mainland district surrounding Mundheim (northwest and west of the island). On 1 January 1964, Varaldsøy Municipality was dissolved and the Mundheim area (population: 300) was administratively transferred to Kvam Municipality, and the rest of Varaldsøy became a part of Kvinnherad Municipality.

== See also ==
- Robert Mundheim (born 1933), an American attorney, law professor, and Dean of the University of Pennsylvania Law School
