= Strandebarm =

Strandebarm may refer to:

== Places ==
- Strandebarm, Vestland, a village in Kvam Municipality in Vestland county, Norway
- Strandebarm Municipality, a former municipality in the old Hordaland county, Norway

== Religion ==
- Strandebarm Church, a church in Kvam Municipality in Vestland county, Norway
- Deanery of Strandebarm, an independent conservative Lutheran deanery in Norway (1991-2012)
