= Bruvik Church =

Church in Vestland, Norway

- Bruvik kyrkje
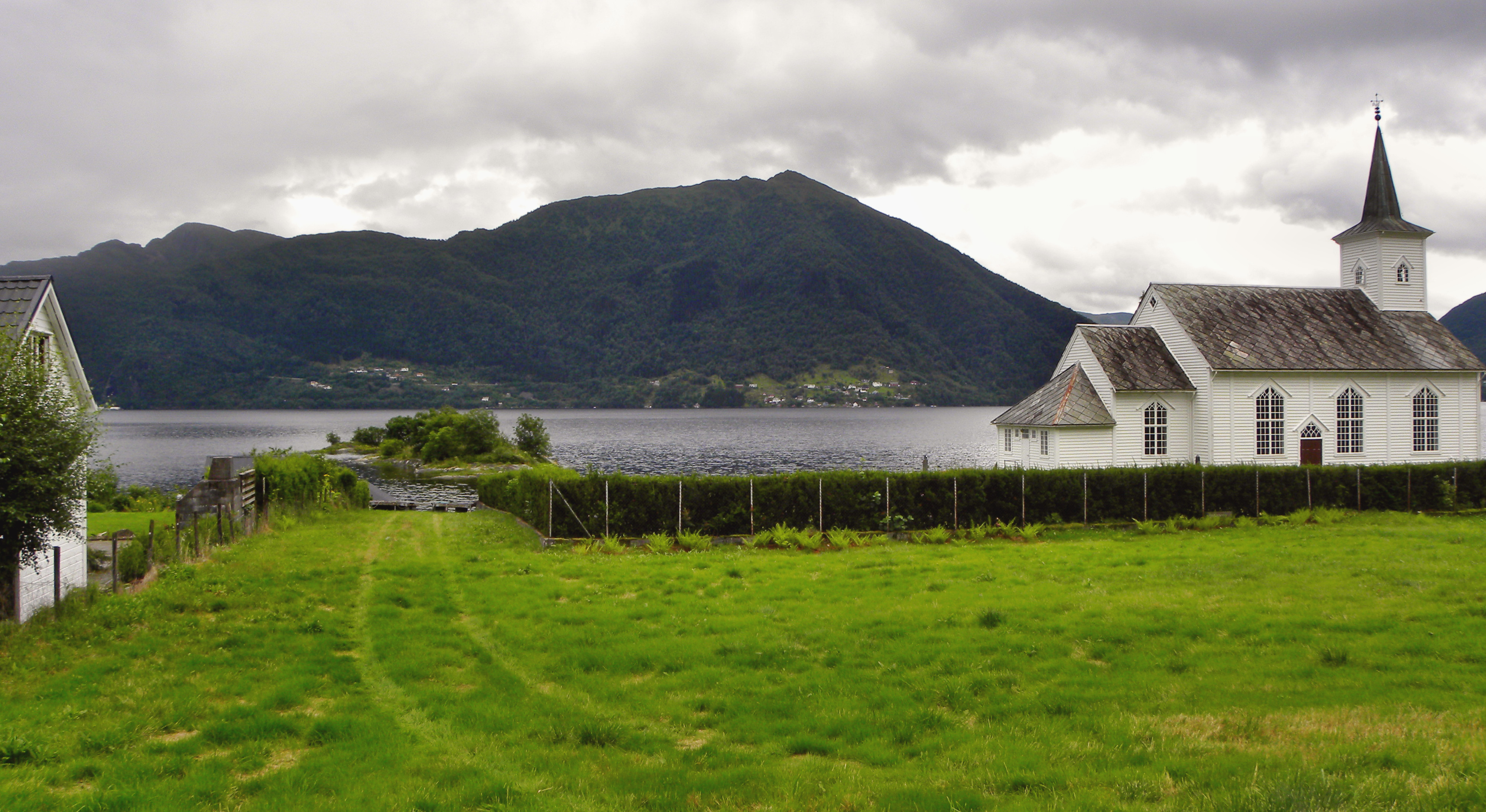
- View of the church
- Bruvik Church
- 60°28′45″N 5°40′39″E
- Location: Osterøy Municipality, Vestland
- Country: Norway
- Denomination: Church of Norway
- Previous denomination: Catholic Church
- Churchmanship: Evangelical Lutheran

History
- Former name: Brudvig kirke
- Status: Parish church
- Founded: 13th century
- Consecrated: 1867

Architecture
- Functional status: Active
- Architect: F.H. Stockfleth
- Architectural type: Long church
- Completed: 1867 (159 years ago)

Specifications
- Capacity: 350
- Materials: Wood

Administration
- Diocese: Bjørgvin bispedømme
- Deanery: Åsane prosti
- Parish: Bruvik
- Norwegian Cultural Heritage Site
- Type: Church
- Status: Listed
- ID: 83962

Bruvik Church (Norwegian: Bruvik kyrkje) is a parish church of the Church of Norway in Osterøy Municipality in Vestland county, Norway. It is located in the village of Bruvik. It is the church for the Bruvik parish which is part of the Åsane prosti (deanery) in the Diocese of Bjørgvin. The white, wooden church was built in a long church design in 1867 using plans drawn up by the architect Frederik Hannibal Stockfleth. The church seats about 350 people.

== History ==
The earliest existing historical records of the church date back to the year 1340, but it was not new that year. The first church in Bruvik was a wooden stave church that was likely built during the 13th century. That church was torn down and replaced by a timber-framed long church on the same site during the early 17th century, possibly in 1608. That church was described in the record books as a small church with a small tower on top. It had a church porch that was built using staves. In 1668, the roof on the northern side of the building was replaced. In 1682, the tower was repaired. A new tower was built around 1713.

In 1724, the church was sold to Christian Krogh from Bergen during the great church auction when the King sold churches to pay off debts from the Great Northern War. In 1764, the Garmann family purchased the church. In 1813, the Garmann family sold the church to Svein Djødno. Djødno later sold the church to several local farmers. In 1864, the church was purchased by the parish.

After becoming the owner of the church, the parish determined the need for a new church. Planning began for the new church. Ole Vangberg was hired to build the church, and he used plans that were originally drawn up by Frederik Hannibal Stockfleth for Fusa Church. Vangberg used those plans with some modifications. In 1866, the old church was torn down and the new church was built on the same site. The new church was consecrated in 1867.

== Media gallery ==
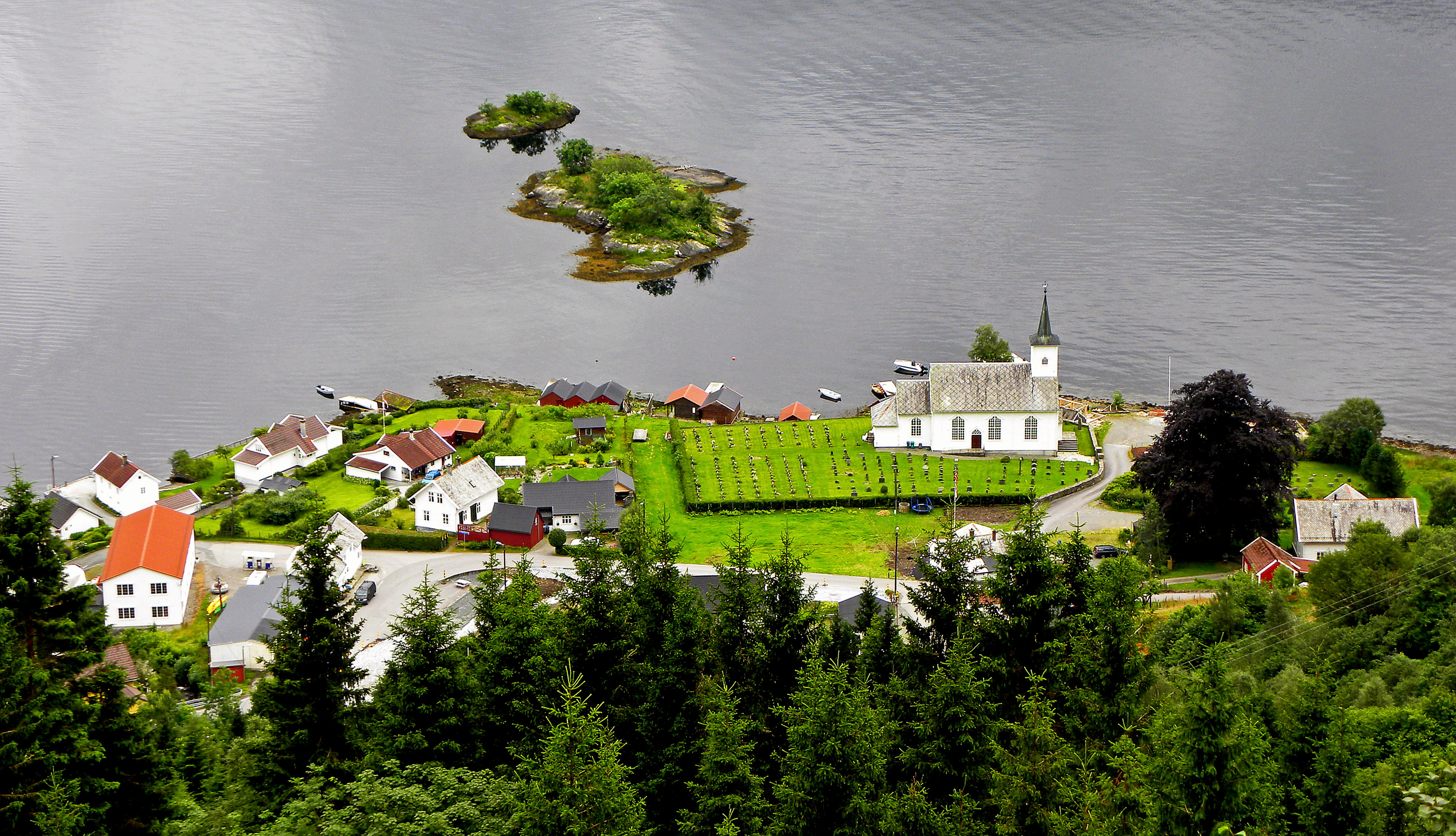

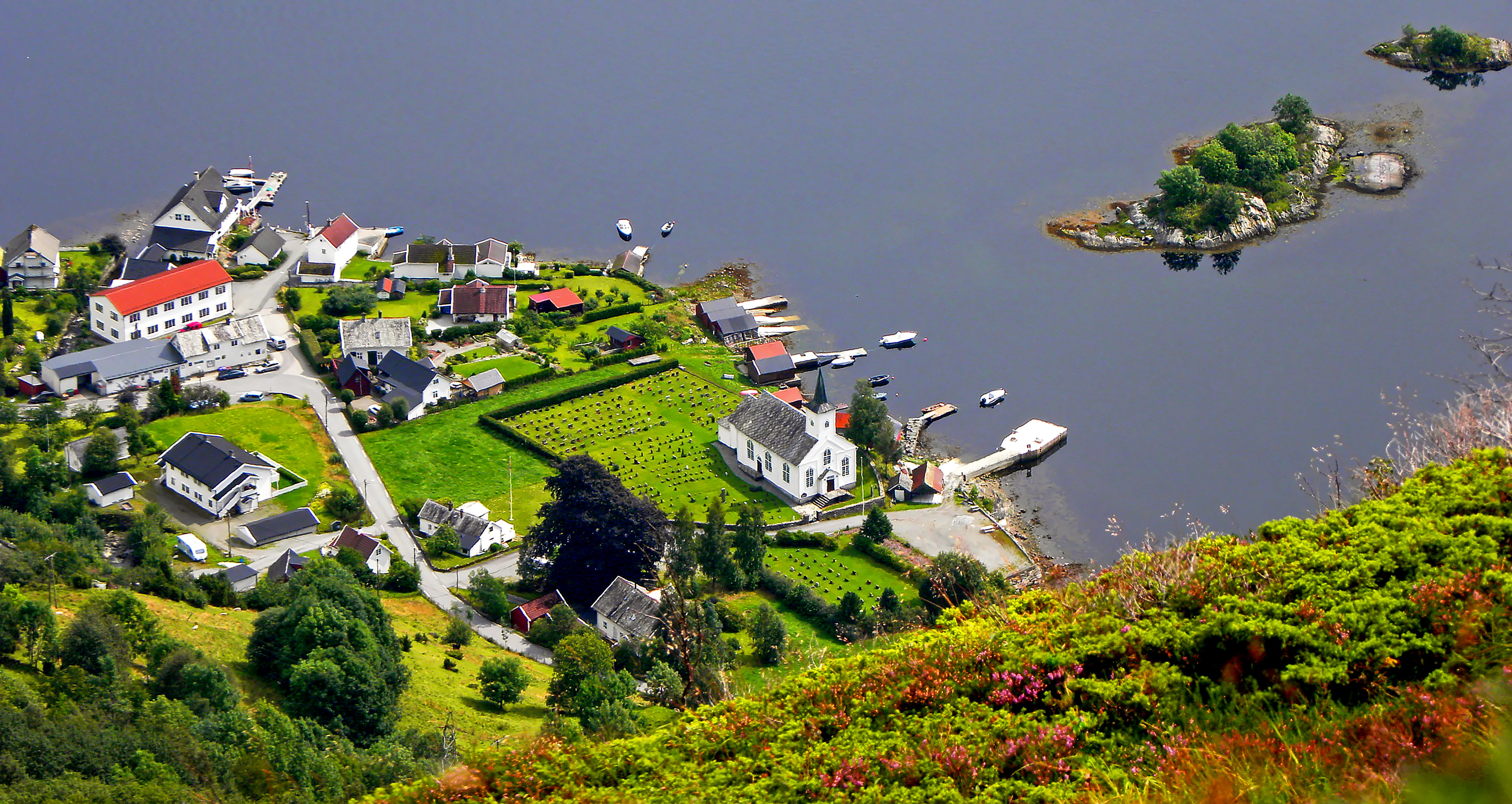

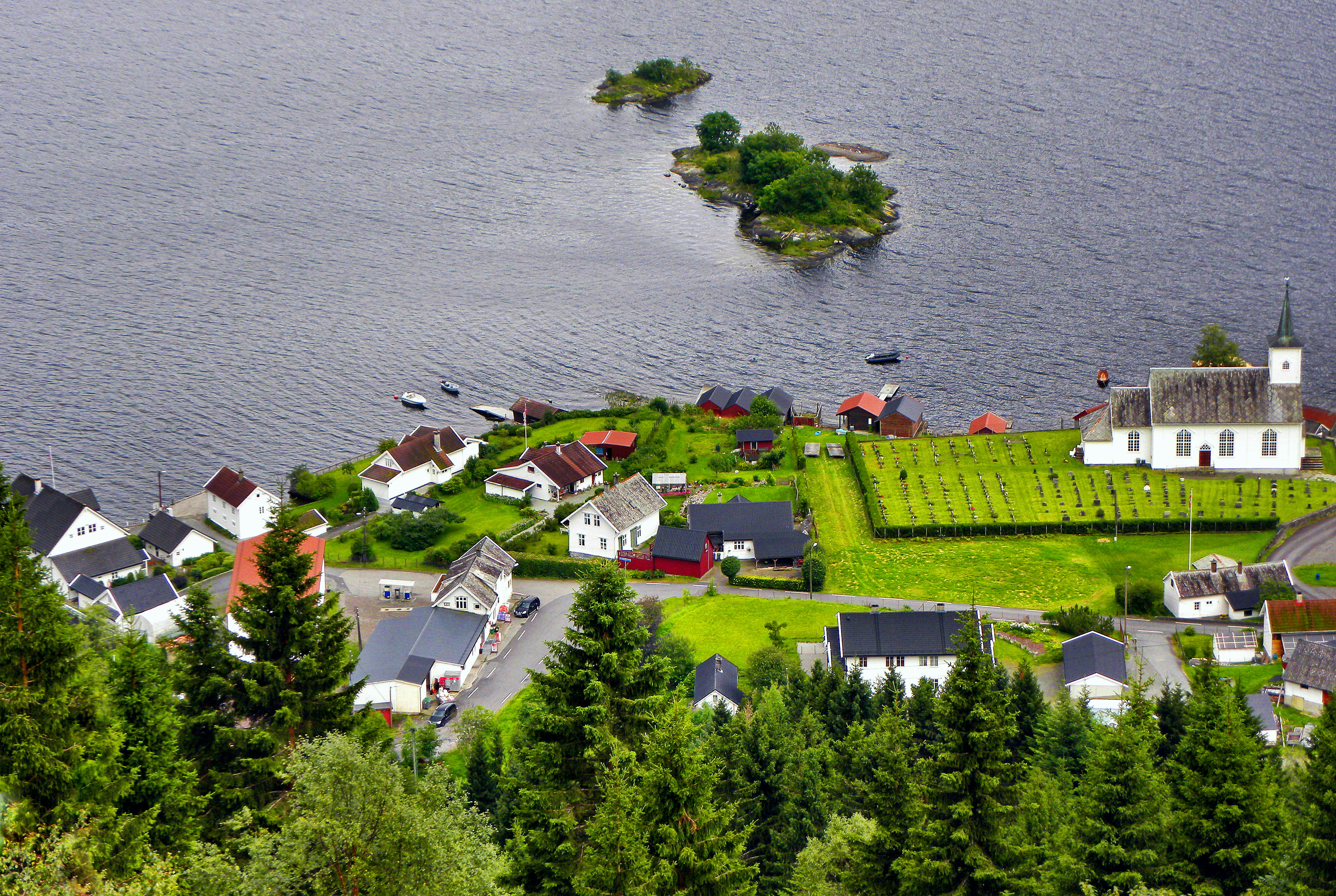

== See also ==
- List of churches in Bjørgvin
