= Strandvik Municipality =

Former municipality in Hordaland, Norway

Strandvik Municipality Strandvik herad
- Former municipality
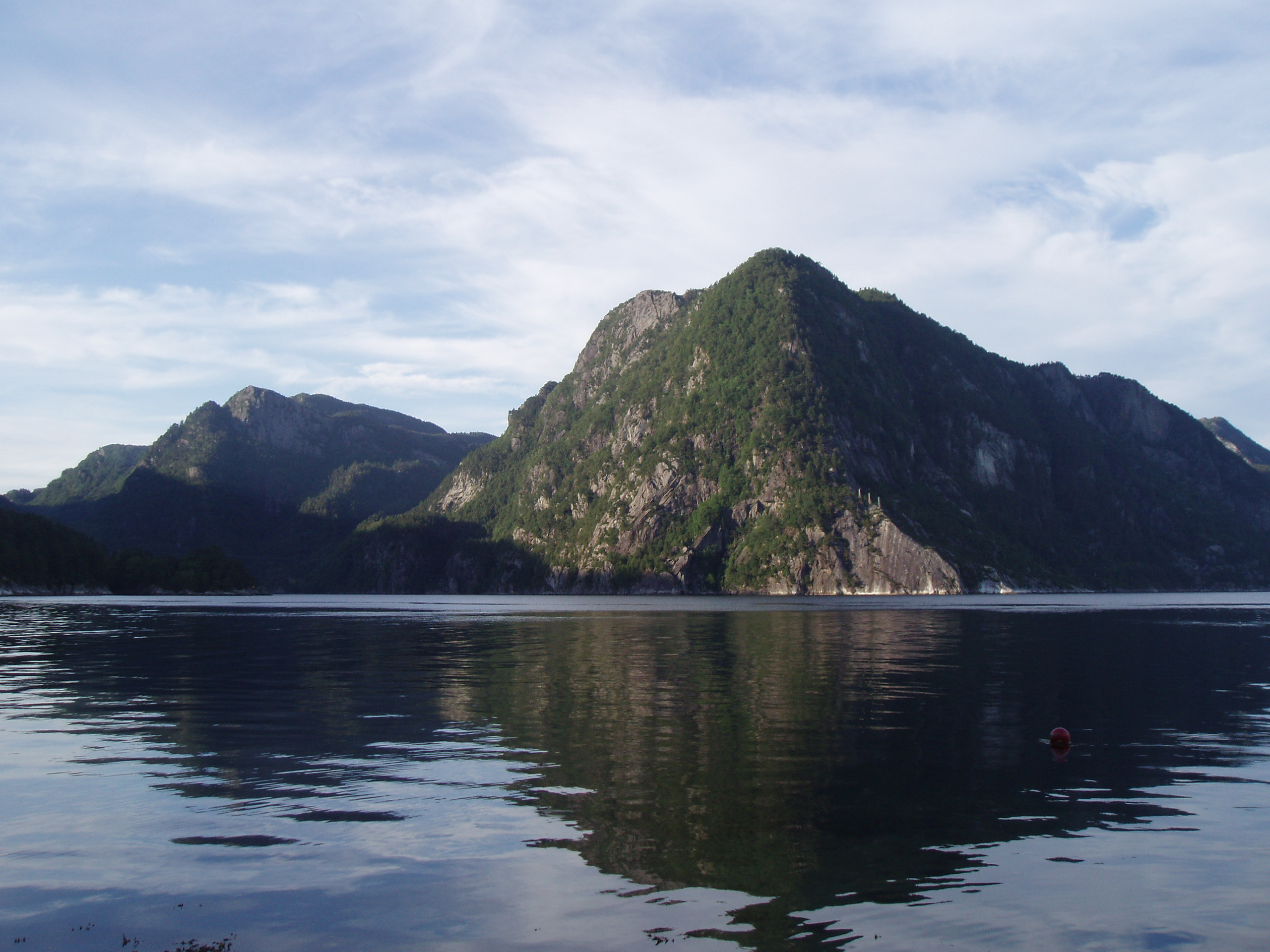
- View of the Sævareidfjorden

- Hordaland within Norway

- Strandvik within Hordaland
- Coordinates: 60°09′34″N 05°40′00″E
- Country: Norway
- County: Hordaland
- District: Midhordland
- Established: 1 Jan 1903
  - Preceded by: Fusa Municipality
- Disestablished: 1 Jan 1964
  - Succeeded by: Fusa Municipality
- Administrative centre: Strandvik

Government
  - Mayor (1952–1963): Stein Hauge (Sp)

Area (upon dissolution)
  - Total: 143.2 km^{2} (55.3 sq mi)
  - Rank: #440 in Norway
- Highest elevation: 819 m (2,687 ft)

Population (1963)
  - Total: 2,078
  - Rank: #424 in Norway
  - Density: 14.5/km^{2} (38/sq mi)
  - Change (10 years): ▼ −10.4%
- Demonym: Strandvik-folk

Official language
  - Norwegian form: Nynorsk
- Time zone: UTC+01:00 (CET)
  - Summer (DST): UTC+02:00 (CEST)
- ISO 3166 code: NO-1240

Strandvik is a former municipality in the old Hordaland county, Norway. The 143.2-square-kilometre (55.3 sq mi) municipality existed from 1903 until its dissolution in 1964. The area is now part of Bjørnafjorden Municipality in the traditional district of Midhordland in Vestland county. The administrative centre was the village of Strandvik where Strandvik Church is located.

Prior to its dissolution in 1964, the 143.2-square-kilometre (55.3 sq mi) municipality was the 440th largest by area out of the 689 municipalities in Norway. Strandvik Municipality was the 424th most populous municipality in Norway with a population of about 2,078. The municipality's population density was 14.5 inhabitants per square kilometre (38/sq mi) and its population had decreased by 10.4% over the previous 10-year period.

== General information ==
This municipality was established on 1 January 1903 when Fusa Municipality was divided into three municipalities as follows:

- the southern area (population: 1,876) became the new Strandvik Municipality
- the northeastern area (population: 647) became the new Haalandsdalen Municipality (later spelled Hålandsdal)
- the northwestern area (population: 1,072) became a much smaller Fusa Municipality

During the 1960s, there were many municipal mergers across Norway due to the work of the Schei Committee. On 1 January 1964, this municipality was dissolved and the following areas were merged to form a new, larger Fusa Municipality:

- all of Strandvik Municipality (population: 2,053)
- all of Hålandsdal Municipality (population: 528)
- most of Fusa Municipality (population: 1,466), except for the Bogstrand area which was transferred to Os Municipality

=== Name ===
The municipality (originally the parish) is named after the old name for the coastal area, Strandvik (Old Norse: Strandvík) since the first Strandvik Church was built there. The first element comes from the genitive case of strǫnd which means "beach" or "shore". The last element comes from the word vík which means "bay" or "inlet".

=== Churches ===
The Church of Norway had one parish (sokn) within Strandvik Municipality. At the time of the municipal dissolution, it was part of the Fusa prestegjeld and the Midhordland prosti (deanery) in the Diocese of Bjørgvin.

Churches in Strandvik Municipality
Parish (sokn)	Church name	Location of the church	Year built
Strandvik	Strandvik Church	Strandvik	1857
Strandvik	Sundvor Chapel	Sundvor	1927

== Geography ==
The municipality included the lands around the inner part of the Bjørnafjorden and Sævareidfjorden. It also included the areas surrounding the large lake Henangervatnet. The highest point in the municipality was the 819-metre (2,687 ft) tall mountain Våganipen.

Fusa Municipality was located to the north, Hålandsdal Municipality was located to the northeast, Varaldsøy Municipality was located to the east, Kvinnherad Municipality was located to the southeast, and Tysnes Municipality was located to the southwest. The Bjørnafjorden was located to the west.

== Government ==
While it existed, Strandvik Municipality was responsible for primary education (through 10th grade), outpatient health services, senior citizen services, welfare and other social services, zoning, economic development, and municipal roads and utilities. The municipality was governed by a municipal council of directly elected representatives. The mayor was indirectly elected by a vote of the municipal council. The municipality was under the jurisdiction of the Gulating Court of Appeal.

=== Municipal council ===
The municipal council (Heradsstyre) of Strandvik Municipality was made up of 15 representatives that were elected to four year terms. The tables below show the historical composition of the council by political party.

Strandvik heradsstyre 1959–1963
Party name (in Nynorsk)	Number of representatives
Local List(s) (Lokale lister)	15
Total number of members:	15
Note: On 1 January 1964, Strandvik Municipality became part of Fusa Municipality.

Strandvik heradsstyre 1955–1959
Party name (in Nynorsk)	Number of representatives
Labour Party (Arbeidarpartiet)	3
Local List(s) (Lokale lister)	12
Total number of members:	15

Strandvik heradsstyre 1951–1955
Party name (in Nynorsk)	Number of representatives
Labour Party (Arbeidarpartiet)	2
Local List(s) (Lokale lister)	10
Total number of members:	12

Strandvik heradsstyre 1947–1951
Party name (in Nynorsk)	Number of representatives
Local List(s) (Lokale lister)	12
Total number of members:	12

Strandvik heradsstyre 1945–1947
Party name (in Nynorsk)	Number of representatives
Local List(s) (Lokale lister)	12
Total number of members:	12

Strandvik heradsstyre 1937–1941*
Party name (in Nynorsk)	Number of representatives
Labour Party (Arbeidarpartiet)	2
Local List(s) (Lokale lister)	10
Total number of members:	12
Note: Due to the German occupation of Norway during World War II, no elections were held for new municipal councils until after the war ended in 1945.

=== Mayors ===
The mayor (Nynorsk: ordførar) of Strandvik Municipality was the political leader of the municipality and the chairperson of the municipal council. The following people held this position:

- 1903–1910: Thore Sundvor
- 1911–1919: Hans Baartveit
- 1920–1937: Mikal Leigland
- 1938–1941: Klement Eikeland
- 1941–1945: Johannes Reigstad
- 1945–1951: Klement Eikeland
- 1952–1963: Stein Hauge (Sp)

== See also ==
- List of former municipalities of Norway
