= Varaldsøy Municipality =

Former municipality in Hordaland, Norway

Varaldsøy Municipality Varaldsøy herad
- Former municipality
- Varaldsø herred (historic name)
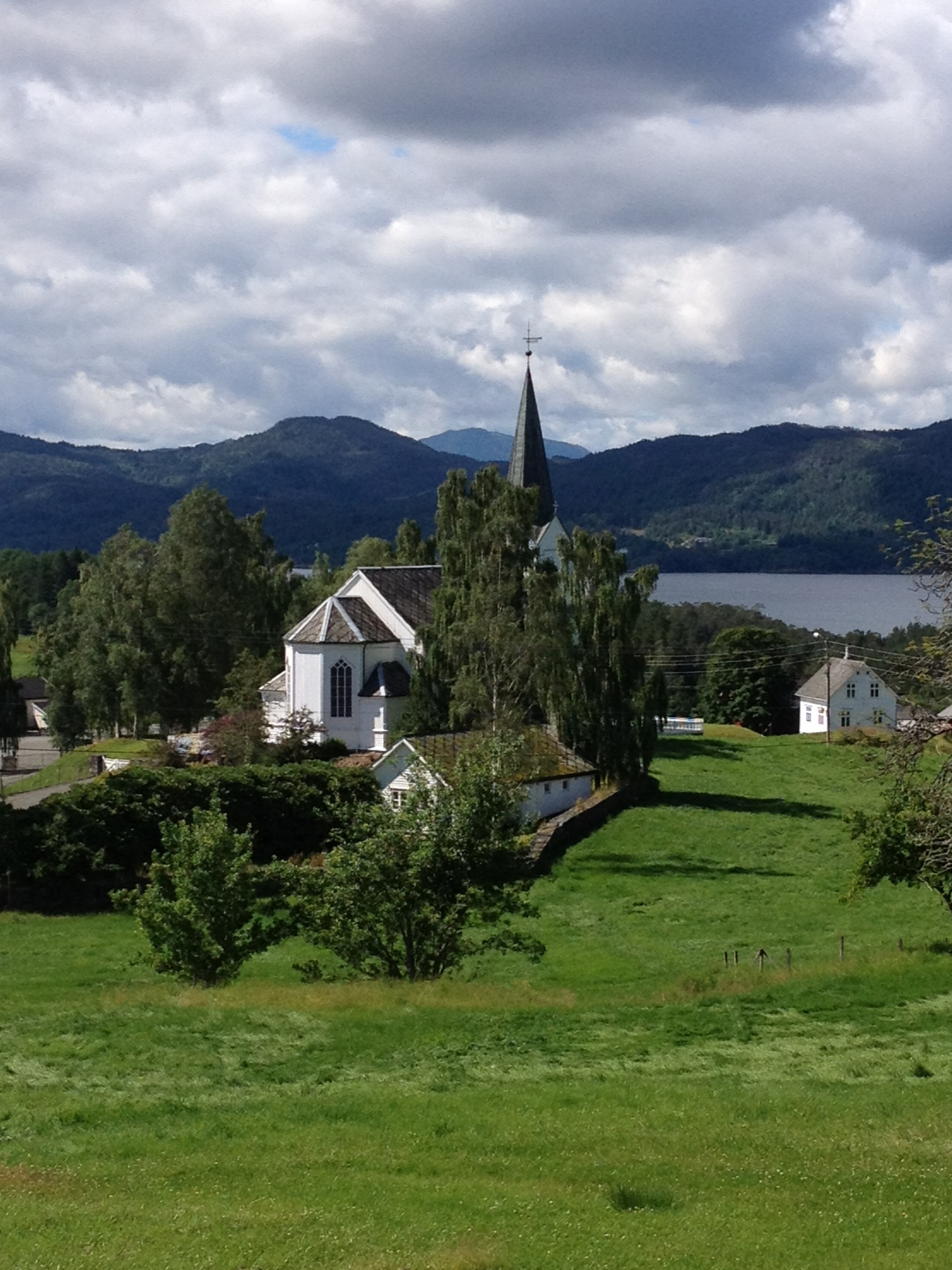
- View of the Varaldsøy Church on Varaldsøy

- Hordaland within Norway

- Varaldsøy within Hordaland
- Coordinates: 60°07′43″N 05°59′21″E
- Country: Norway
- County: Hordaland
- District: Hardanger
- Established: 1 Jan 1902
  - Preceded by: Strandebarm Municipality
- Disestablished: 1 Jan 1965
  - Succeeded by: Kvinnherad Municipality and Kvam Municipality
- Administrative centre: Våge

Government
  - Mayor (1964–1965): Haktor Djuvsland

Area (upon dissolution)
  - Total: 83.1 km^{2} (32.1 sq mi)
  - Rank: #438 in Norway
- Highest elevation: 767 m (2,516 ft)

Population (1964)
  - Total: 809
  - Rank: #502 in Norway
  - Density: 9.7/km^{2} (25/sq mi)
  - Change (10 years): ▼ −0.9%
- Demonym: Varaldsøying

Official language
  - Norwegian form: Nynorsk
- Time zone: UTC+01:00 (CET)
  - Summer (DST): UTC+02:00 (CEST)
- ISO 3166 code: NO-1225

Varaldsøy is a former municipality in the old Hordaland county, Norway. The 83.1-square-kilometre (32.1 sq mi) municipality existed from 1902 until its dissolution in 1965. The area is now divided between Kvinnherad Municipality and Kvam Municipality in the traditional district of Hardanger in Vestland county. The administrative centre was the village of Våge on the south part of the island of Varaldsøy. Other villages in the municipality included Mundheim and Gjermundshamn.

Prior to its dissolution in 1965, the 83.1-square-kilometre (32.1 sq mi) municipality was the 438th largest by area out of the 525 municipalities in Norway. Varaldsøy Municipality was the 502nd most populous municipality in Norway with a population of about 809. The municipality's population density was 9.7 inhabitants per square kilometre (25/sq mi) and its population had decreased by 0.9% over the previous 10-year period.

== General information ==
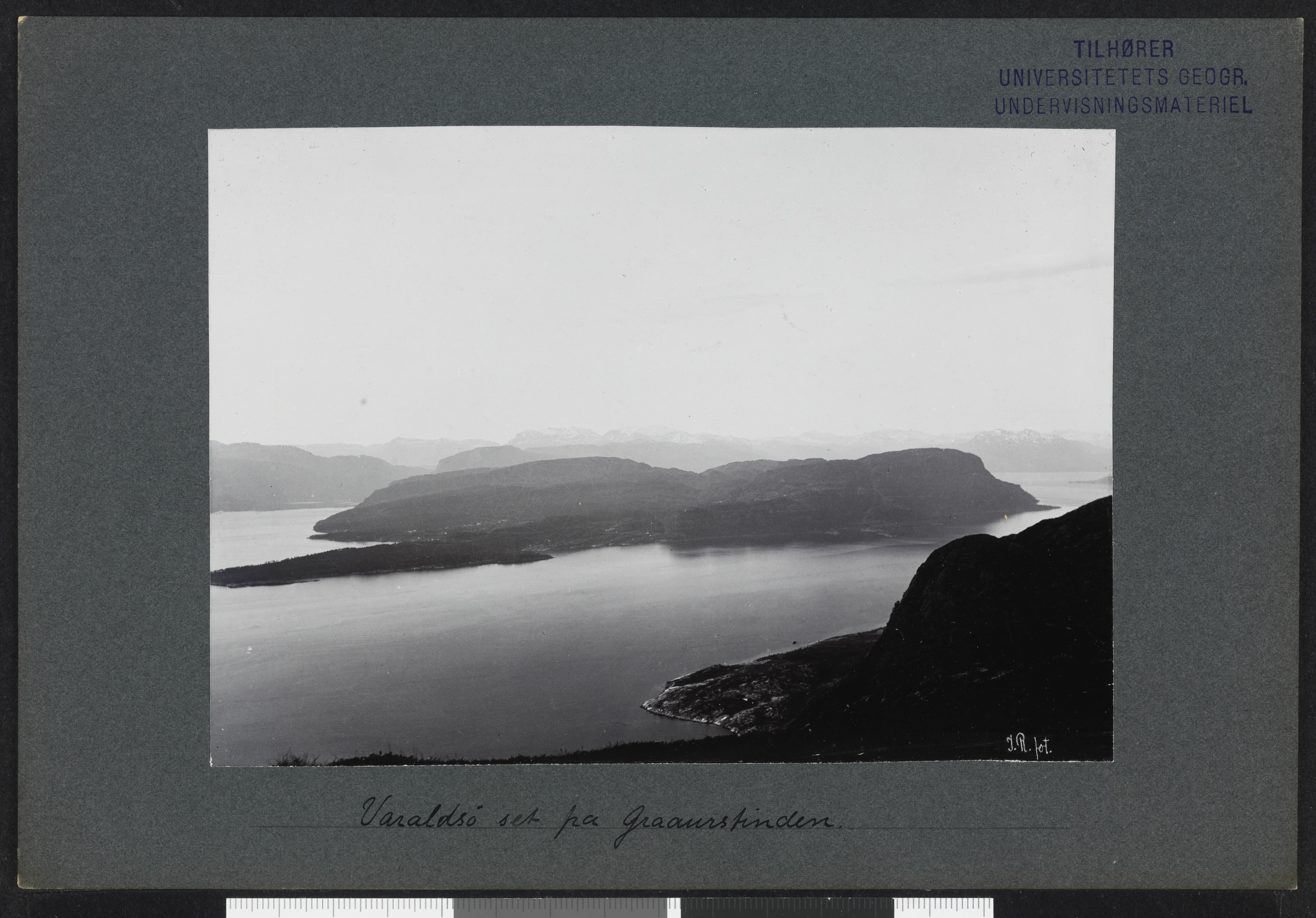
View of Varaldsøy

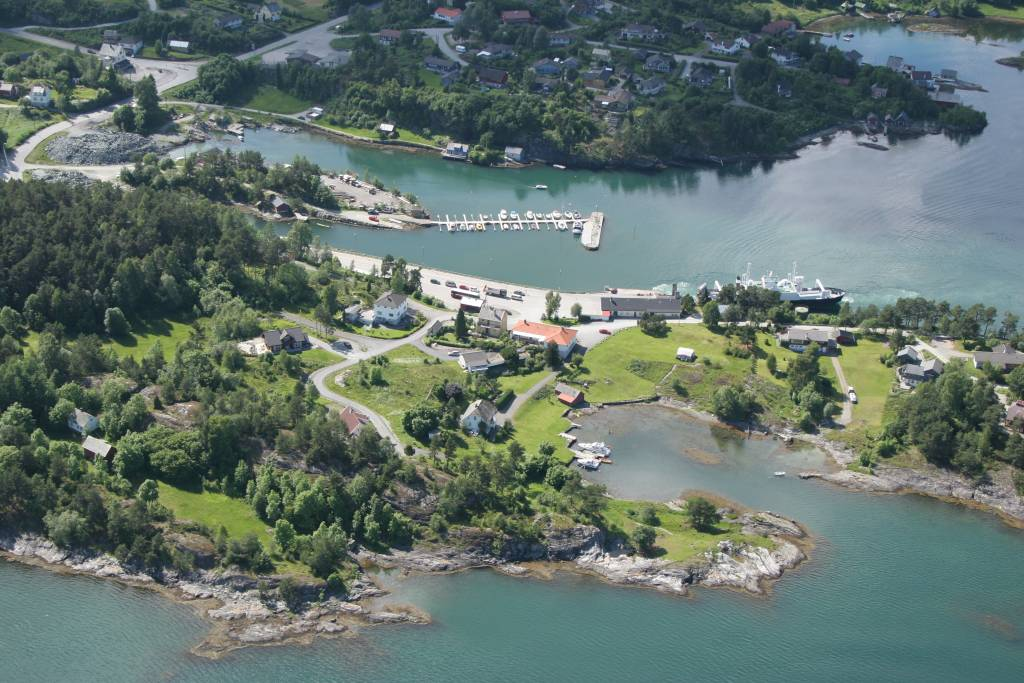
View of Gjermundshamn

On 1 January 1902, Strandebarm Municipality was divided into two municipalities: the southern part (population: 848) became the new Varaldsøy Municipality and the northern part (population: 1,661) remained as a smaller Strandebarm Municipality.

During the 1960s, there were many municipal mergers across Norway due to the work of the Schei Committee. On 1 January 1965, Varaldsøy Municipality was dissolved and its lands were split between two neighboring municipalities. The Mundheim area northwest of the island on the mainland (population: 300) was incorporated into Kvam Municipality. The island of Varaldsøy and the rest of the mainland area southwest of the island (population: 511) became a part of Kvinnherad Municipality.

=== Name ===
The municipality (originally the parish) is named after the island of Varaldsøy (Old Norse: Varaldsey). The first element comes from the old male name Varaldr. The last element is ey which means "island". Historically, the name of the municipality was spelled Varaldsø. On 3 November 1917, a royal resolution changed the spelling of the name of the municipality to Varaldsøy. The letter y was added to the end of the word to "Norwegianize" the name (ø is the Danish word for "island" and øy is the Norwegian word).

=== Churches ===
The Church of Norway had one parish (sokn) within Varaldsøy Municipality. At the time of the municipal dissolution, it was part of the Strandebarm prestegjeld and the Hardanger og Voss prosti (deanery) in the Diocese of Bjørgvin.

Churches in Varaldsøy Municipality
Parish (sokn)	Church name	Location of the church	Year built
Varaldsøy	Varaldsøy Church	Varaldsøy	1885

== Geography ==
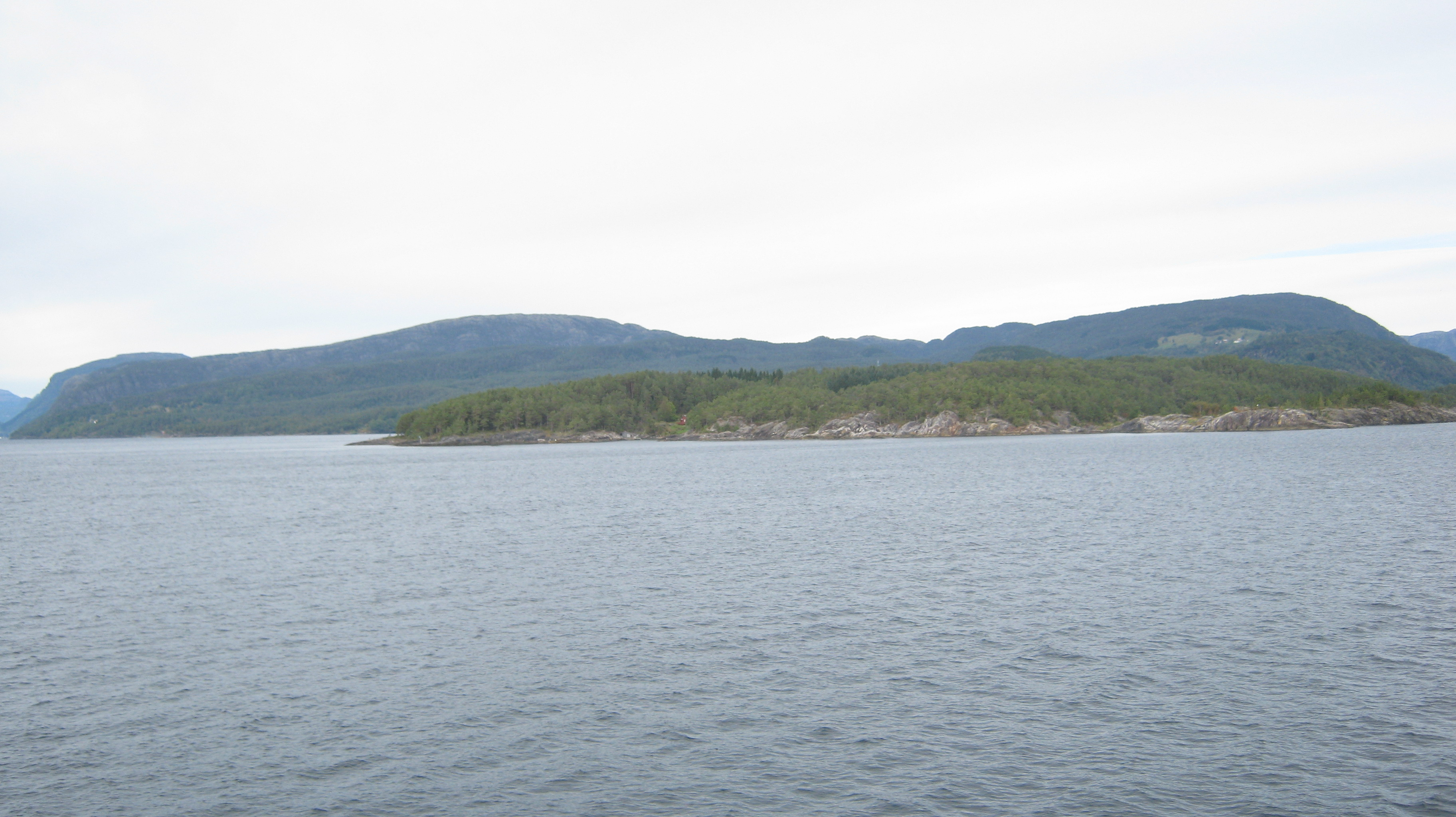
View of the southern part of the island

The municipality encompassed the whole island of Varaldsøy and a 2-to-3-kilometre (1.2 to 1.9 mi) wide strip of the mainland located west of the island. The highest point in the municipality was the 767-metre (2,516 ft) tall mountain Lukefjellet, a tripoint on the border with Strandebarm Municipality, Strandvik Municipality, and Hålandsdal Municipality. Strandebarm Municipality was located to the north, Kvinnherad Municipality was located to the east and south, Strandvik Municipality was located to the west, and Hålandsdal Municipality was located to the northwest.

== Government ==
While it existed, Varaldsøy Municipality was responsible for primary education (through 10th grade), outpatient health services, senior citizen services, welfare and other social services, zoning, economic development, and municipal roads and utilities. The municipality was governed by a municipal council of directly elected representatives. The mayor was indirectly elected by a vote of the municipal council. The municipality was under the jurisdiction of the Gulating Court of Appeal.

=== Municipal council ===
The municipal council (Heradsstyre) of Varaldsøy Municipality was made up of representatives that were elected to four year terms. The tables below show the historical composition of the council by political party.

Varaldsøy heradsstyre 1963–1965
Party name (in Nynorsk)	Number of representatives
Local List(s) (Lokale lister)	13
Total number of members:	13
Note: On 1 January 1965, Varaldsøy Municipality was divided between Kvinnherad Municipality and Kvam Municipality.

Varaldsøy heradsstyre 1959–1963
Party name (in Nynorsk)	Number of representatives
Local List(s) (Lokale lister)	13
Total number of members:	13

Varaldsøy heradsstyre 1955–1959
Party name (in Nynorsk)	Number of representatives
Local List(s) (Lokale lister)	13
Total number of members:	13

Varaldsøy heradsstyre 1951–1955
Party name (in Nynorsk)	Number of representatives
Local List(s) (Lokale lister)	12
Total number of members:	12

Varaldsøy heradsstyre 1947–1951
Party name (in Nynorsk)	Number of representatives
Local List(s) (Lokale lister)	12
Total number of members:	12

Varaldsøy heradsstyre 1945–1947
Party name (in Nynorsk)	Number of representatives
Local List(s) (Lokale lister)	12
Total number of members:	12

Varaldsøy heradsstyre 1937–1941*
Party name (in Nynorsk)	Number of representatives
Local List(s) (Lokale lister)	12
Total number of members:	12
Note: Due to the German occupation of Norway during World War II, no elections were held for new municipal councils until after the war ended in 1945.

=== Mayors ===
The mayor (Nynorsk: ordførar) of Varaldsøy Municipality was the political leader of the municipality and the chairperson of the municipal council. The following people have held this position:

- 1902–1919: Nils Dybsland
- 1920–1922: Nils Kårstad
- 1923–1925: Torbjørn Galtung
- 1926–1928: Erik Skjelnæs
- 1929–1931: Nils Dybsland
- 1932–1940: Kristoffer Mundheim
- 1941–1942: Lars Nedrevåge
- 1942–1945: Sverre Mundheim
- 1945–1945: Kristoffer Mundheim
- 1946–1961: Lars Gerhard Sandvik
- 1961–1963: Arnt Johan Pettersen
- 1964–1965: Haktor Djuvsland

== See also ==
- List of former municipalities of Norway
