= Stord Church =

Church in Vestland, Norway

- Stord kyrkje
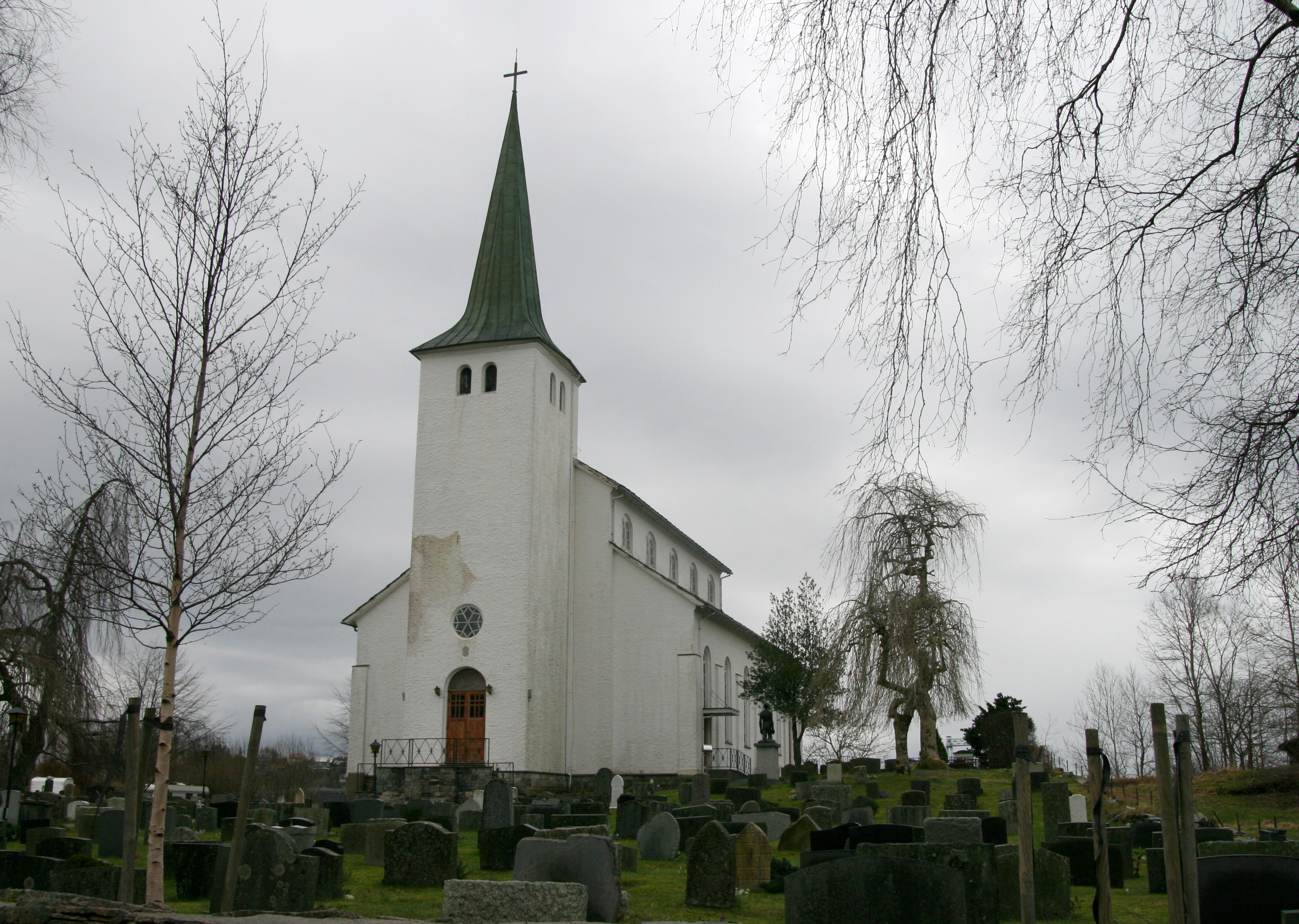
- View of the church
- Stord Church
- 59°47′14″N 5°30′37″E
- Location: Stord Municipality, Vestland
- Country: Norway
- Denomination: Church of Norway
- Previous denomination: Catholic Church
- Churchmanship: Evangelical Lutheran

History
- Status: Parish church
- Founded: 13th century
- Consecrated: 6 Sept 1857

Architecture
- Functional status: Active
- Architect(s): Andreas Grønning and F.H. Stockfleth
- Architectural type: Long church
- Completed: 1857 (169 years ago)

Specifications
- Capacity: 400
- Materials: Stone

Administration
- Diocese: Bjørgvin bispedømme
- Deanery: Sunnhordland prosti
- Parish: Stord
- Norwegian Cultural Heritage Site
- Type: Church
- Status: Listed
- ID: 85577

Stord Church (Norwegian: Stord kyrkje) is a parish church of the Church of Norway in Stord Municipality in Vestland county, Norway. It is located in the town of Leirvik on the southern side of the island of Stord. It is the church for the Stord parish which is part of the Sunnhordland prosti (deanery) in the Diocese of Bjørgvin. The white, stone church was built in a long church design in 1857 using plans drawn up by the architects Andreas Grønning and Frederik Hannibal Stockfleth. The church seats about 400 people.

== History ==
The church in Stord was likely established during the 13th century. Around the year 1300, historians believe one of two options happened. Either the old church was torn down and a new rectangular stone church was constructed on the site, or (more likely), the original stone church was enlarged by expanding the size of the original choir. Regardless, after about 1300, the church was a rectangular church made out of stone. in 1687–1688, the whole roof and the church porch were repaired. In 1724, during the Norwegian church sale, the church was sold by the Crown to Lieutenant Colonel Hans Fredrik Green to pay for the debt from the Great Northern War.

In 1814, this church served as an election church (Norwegian: valgkirke). Together with more than 300 other parish churches across Norway, it was a polling station for elections to the 1814 Norwegian Constituent Assembly which wrote the Constitution of Norway. This was Norway's first national elections. Each church parish was a constituency that elected people called "electors" who later met together in each county to elect the representatives for the assembly that was to meet at Eidsvoll Manor later that year.

In 1854, the privately owned church was sold back to the parish. At that time, the old church was deemed to be small and in poor condition so it was decided that they would tear down the old church and rebuild. The architect Andreas Grønning was hired to design the new church, and soon after he completed the drawings in 1854, he died, so Frederik Hannibal Stockfleth from Bergen oversaw of the construction. Just after Pentecost in 1855, the old church was torn down. Work on the new church was carried out from 1855 to 1857. The new stone church was completed in 1857 and it was consecrated on 6 September 1857. In 1955–1957, the church was restored and remodeled under the direction of the architect Torgeir Alvsaker.

== Media gallery ==
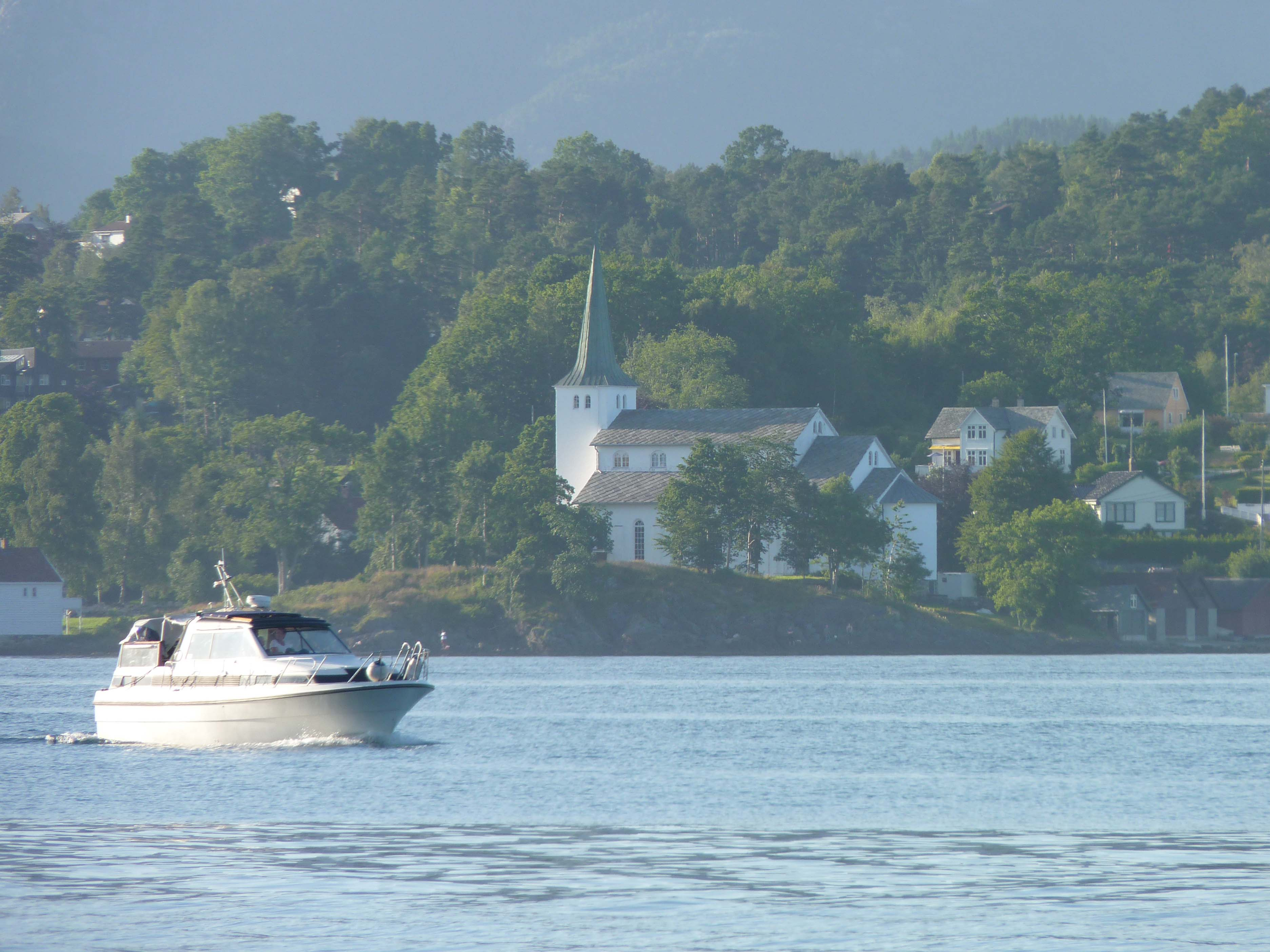

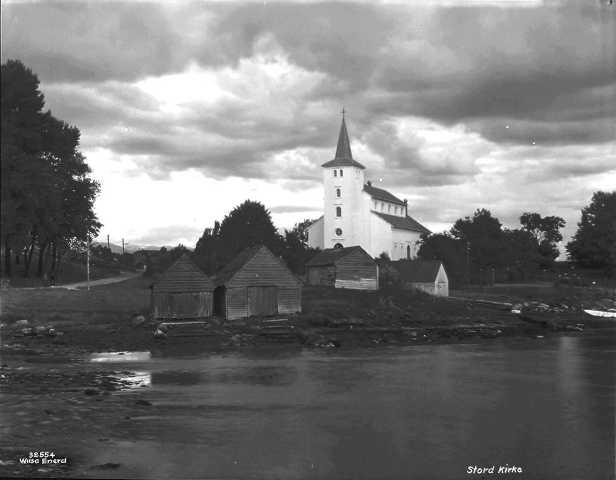

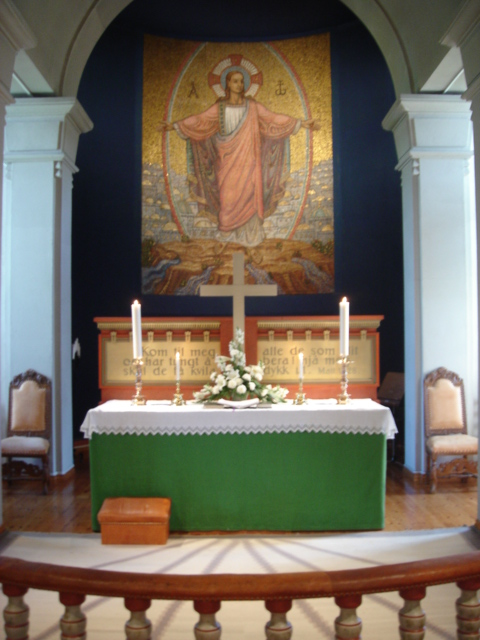

== See also ==
- List of churches in Bjørgvin
