= Frederik Hannibal Stockfleth =

Danish-Norwegian architect

- Born: 10 June 1817; Copenhagen, Denmark
- Died: 25 January 1863 (aged 45); Bergen, Norway
- Education: Royal Danish Academy of Fine Arts
- Occupation: Architect
- Spouse: Georgine Marie Fermann
- Parent(s): Frederik Wilhelm Stockfleth and Sara Birgitte Nielsen

Frederik Hannibal Stockfleth (1817–1863) was a Danish-Norwegian architect. Stylistically, his architectural works range from late classicism to historicism . He was particularly interested in "Old Norse" ornamentation, which he produced in a number of his architectural drawings.

In 1840 he completed his education at the Royal Danish Academy of Fine Arts. Shortly after leaving the Academy of Fine Arts, he moved to Trondheim, Norway, where he first worked as a bricklayer, and eventually joined forces with Theodor Christian Broch in business together. Together they designed the new hospital in Trondheim, which was completed in 1845. Stockfleth moved to Bergen in 1844 and spent the rest of his life there. He was interested in art and culture and several initiatives to establish his own school, with a basic introduction to architecture, first in Trondheim in 1842 and then in Bergen from 1844, where he also became head teacher. From 1851 it was named The Public Drawing School in Bergen.

He was considered the architect behind the Labor Association's assembly hall (1858–1860). He worked with Johan Henrik Nebelong in connection with the construction of the Bergen Museum. He also designed several churches in Western Norway, including Stord Church (1857), Strandvik Church (1857), Fusa Church (1857–1861), Selje Church (1866), and Bruvik Church (1867). Some of these buildings were not completed until after his death. He also participated in the reconstruction of the Kaupanger Stave Church in Sogndal Municipality in 1862.
