= Henrik Jæger =

Norwegian literary critic

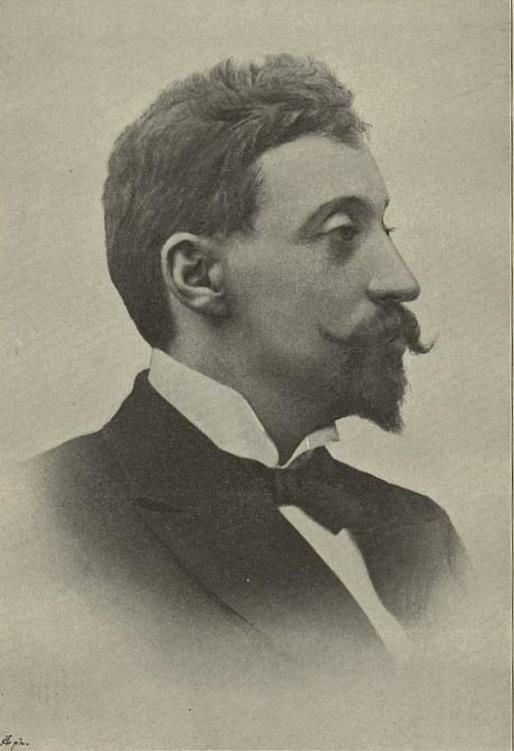
- Born: 4 January 1854; Bergen, Norway
- Died: 17 December 1895 (aged 41); Kristiania
- Occupations: literary historian, literary critic and playwright
- Notable work: Henrik Ibsen 1828–1888. Et litterært Livsbillede (1888); Illustreret norsk Literaturhistorie (1896)
- Relatives: Tycho Jæger (uncle)

Henrik Jæger (4 January 1854 – 17 December 1895) was a Norwegian literary historian, literary critic and playwright.

He was born in Bergen as a son of sailmaker Herman Jæger (1824–1871) and Birgitte Pedersen. He was a nephew of Tycho Jæger. In June 1881 he married Marie Louise Holstad (1853–1931), and their daughter Dagmar Helene Jæger (1889–1979) married Olaf Gjerløw.

He is known for his early monographs on Henrik Ibsen, and for writing the first large Norwegian literary history, Illustreret norsk Literaturhistorie (1896). Among his plays are Løse Fugle and Arvegods.

In 1884 he was a co-founder of the Norwegian Association for Women's Rights.

== Selected works ==
- Henrik Ibsen 1828–1888. Et litterært Livsbillede (1888)
- Illustreret norsk Literaturhistorie (1896; 3 volumes; finished by Otto Anderssen after Jæger's death)
