= Tycho Jæger =

Norwegian painter (1819–1889)

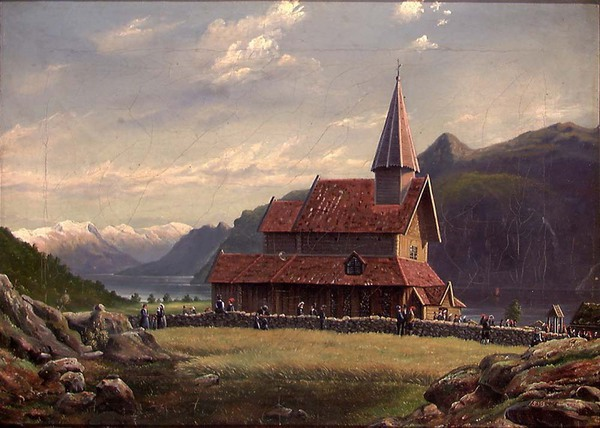
Urnes Church in Sogn (1853)

Tycho Christoffer Jæger (25 June 1819 – 31 January 1889) was a Norwegian painter.

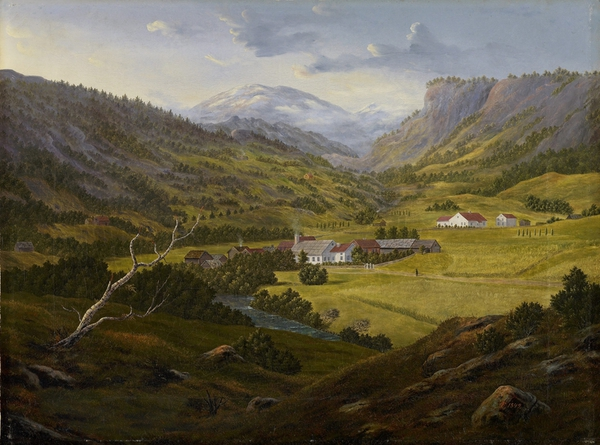
Prestegården in Strandebarm (1849)

== Biography ==
Tycho Christoffer Jæger was born in Bergen as a son of the first cousins, shoemaker Tycho Christoffer Jæger and Øllegaard Jæger. He was an uncle of Henrik Jæger. From September 1870 he was married to Bergithe Steendahl (1850–1932).

He painted between 1841 and 1889, almost exclusively landscapes. He studied partly in Copenhagen, in the 1840s. He also travelled in Norway, Denmark and Sweden, and lived in Bergen and Leikanger after taking his education. Norsk biografisk leksikon called two of his paintings "among the most peculiar to be created in contemporary Norwegian art".
