= Fusa (village) =

Village in Bjørnafjorden Municipality, Norway

- Village
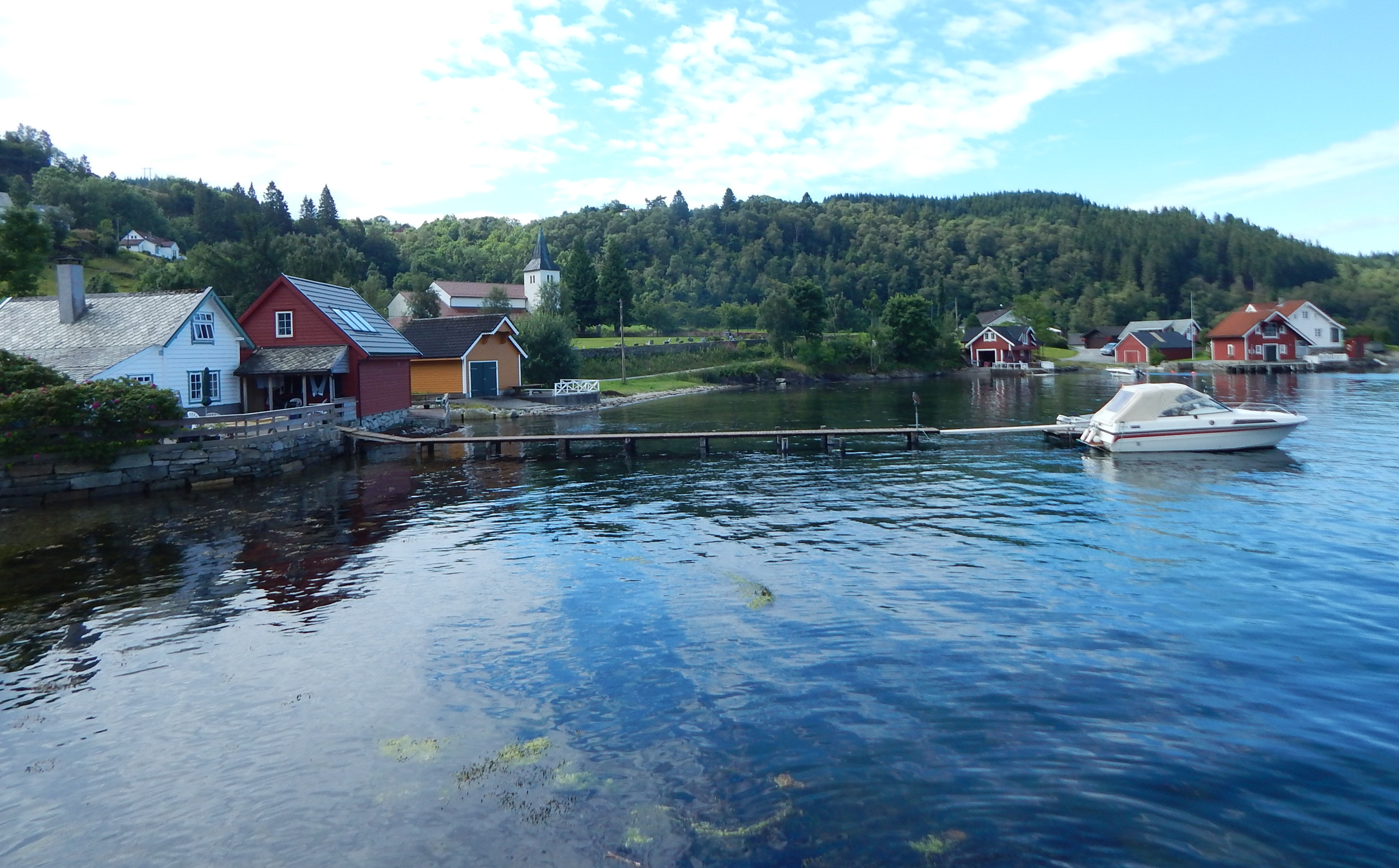
- View of the village
- Interactive map of Fusa
- Coordinates: 60.20372°N 5.62952°E
- Country: Norway
- Region: Western Norway
- County: Vestland
- District: Midhordland
- Municipality: Bjørnafjorden Municipality
- Elevation: 26 m (85 ft)
- Time zone: UTC+01:00 (CET)
  - Summer (DST): UTC+02:00 (CEST)
- Post Code: 5641 Fusa

Fusa is a village in Bjørnafjorden Municipality in Vestland county, Norway. The village is located on the eastern shore of the Fusafjorden, about 10 kilometres (6.2 mi) southwest of the village of Eikelandsosen. The village of Strandvik lies about 10 kilometres (6.2 mi) to the southeast of Fusa and the village of Osøyro lies about 7 kilometres (4.3 mi) straight west (across the fjord).

The large Frank Mohn factory is in Fusa, just southwest of the village centre. The factory here is the marine division of the corporation, specializing in production of cargo pumping systems, transportable pumping system, and anti-heeling pumping systems.

== History ==
The village was historically the administrative centre of the old Fusa Municipality which is why Fusa Church is located here, but more recently the administration was moved to the larger village of Eikelandsosen until 2020 when Fusa Municipality was dissolved and merged into Bjørnafjorden Municipality.
