= Strandvik =

Village in Bjørnafjorden Municipality, Norway

- Village
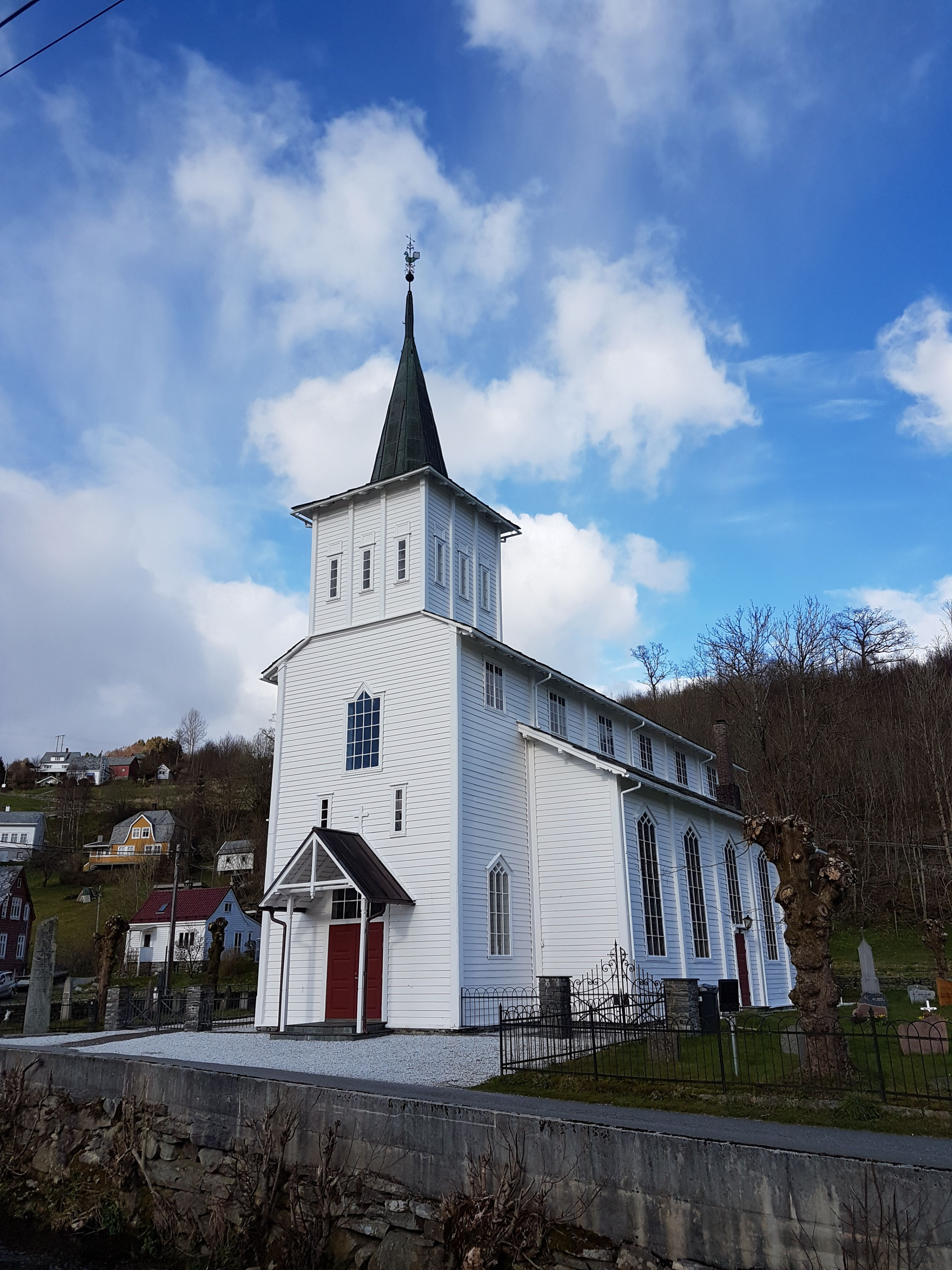
- View of the village church
- Interactive map of Strandvik
- Coordinates: 60.15884°N 5.66553°E
- Country: Norway
- Region: Western Norway
- County: Vestland
- District: Midhordland
- Municipality: Bjørnafjorden Municipality
- Elevation: 3 m (9.8 ft)
- Time zone: UTC+01:00 (CET)
  - Summer (DST): UTC+02:00 (CEST)
- Post Code: 5643 Strandvik

Strandvik is a village in Bjørnafjorden Municipality in Vestland county, Norway. The village lies on the northern shore of the Bjørnafjorden, about 10 kilometres (6.2 mi) east of Osøyro (across the fjord) and about the same distance southeast of the village of Fusa. Strandvik Church is located in the village.

== History ==
This village was the administrative centre of the old Strandvik Municipality which existed from 1903 until 1964.
