= Varaldsøy Church =

Church in Vestland, Norway

- Varaldsøy kyrkje
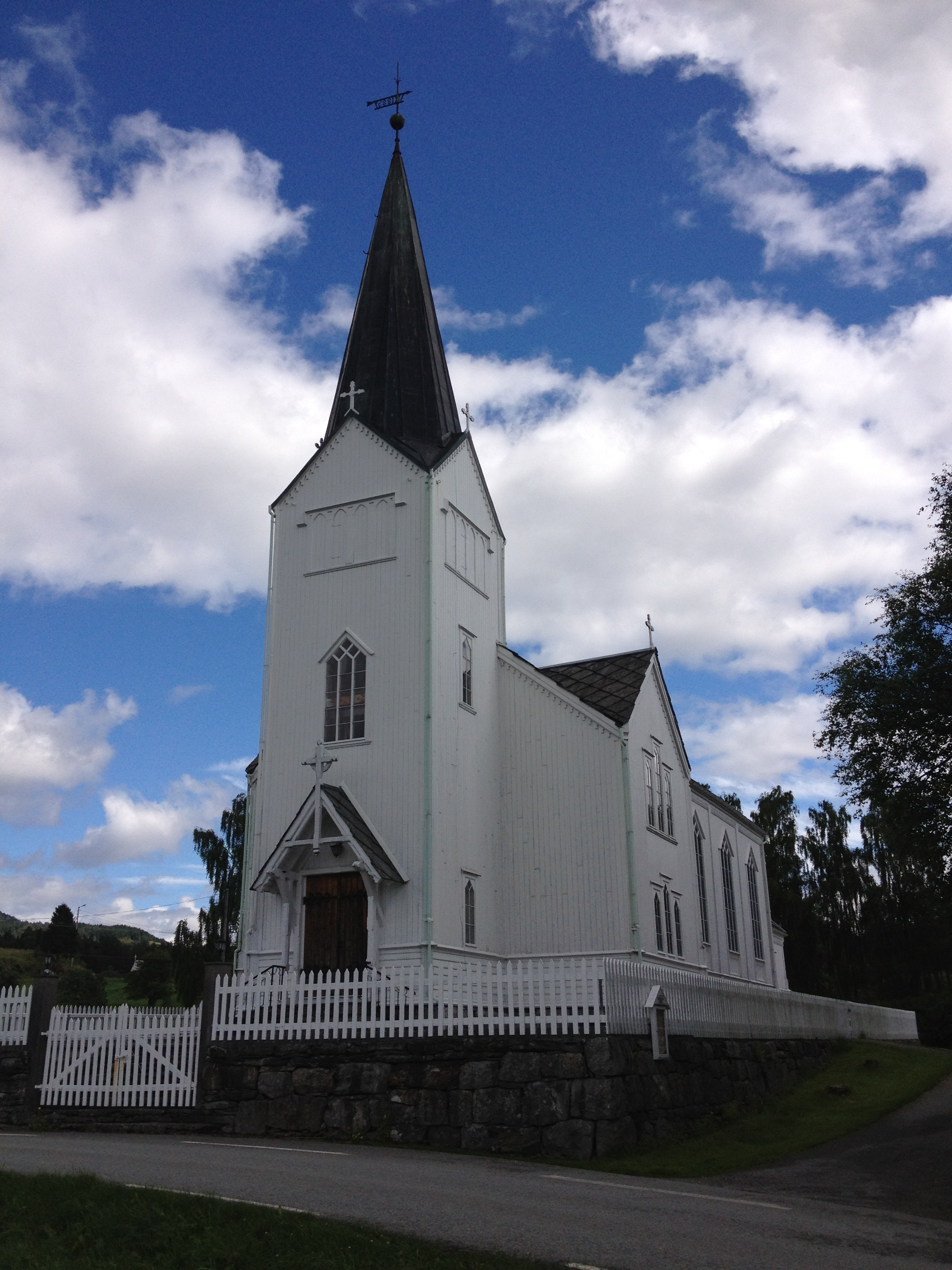
- View of the church
- Varaldsøy Church
- 60°05′50″N 5°58′33″E
- Location: Kvinnherad Municipality, Vestland
- Country: Norway
- Denomination: Church of Norway
- Previous denomination: Catholic Church
- Churchmanship: Evangelical Lutheran

History
- Status: Parish church
- Founded: 13th century
- Consecrated: 1885

Architecture
- Functional status: Active
- Architect(s): Conrad von der Lippe and Hans Heinrich Jess
- Architectural type: Long church
- Completed: 1885 (141 years ago)

Specifications
- Capacity: 390
- Materials: Wood

Administration
- Diocese: Bjørgvin bispedømme
- Deanery: Sunnhordland prosti
- Parish: Varaldsøy
- Norwegian Cultural Heritage Site
- Type: Church
- Status: Listed
- ID: 85767

Varaldsøy Church (Norwegian: Varaldsøy kyrkje) is a parish church of the Church of Norway in Kvinnherad Municipality in Vestland county, Norway. It is located at Våge on the southern part of the island of Varaldsøy. It is the church for the Varaldsøy parish which is part of the Sunnhordland prosti (deanery) in the Diocese of Bjørgvin. The white, wooden church was built in a long church design in 1885 using plans drawn up by the architects Conrad Fredrik von der Lippe and Hans Heinrich Jess. The church seats about 390 people.

== History ==
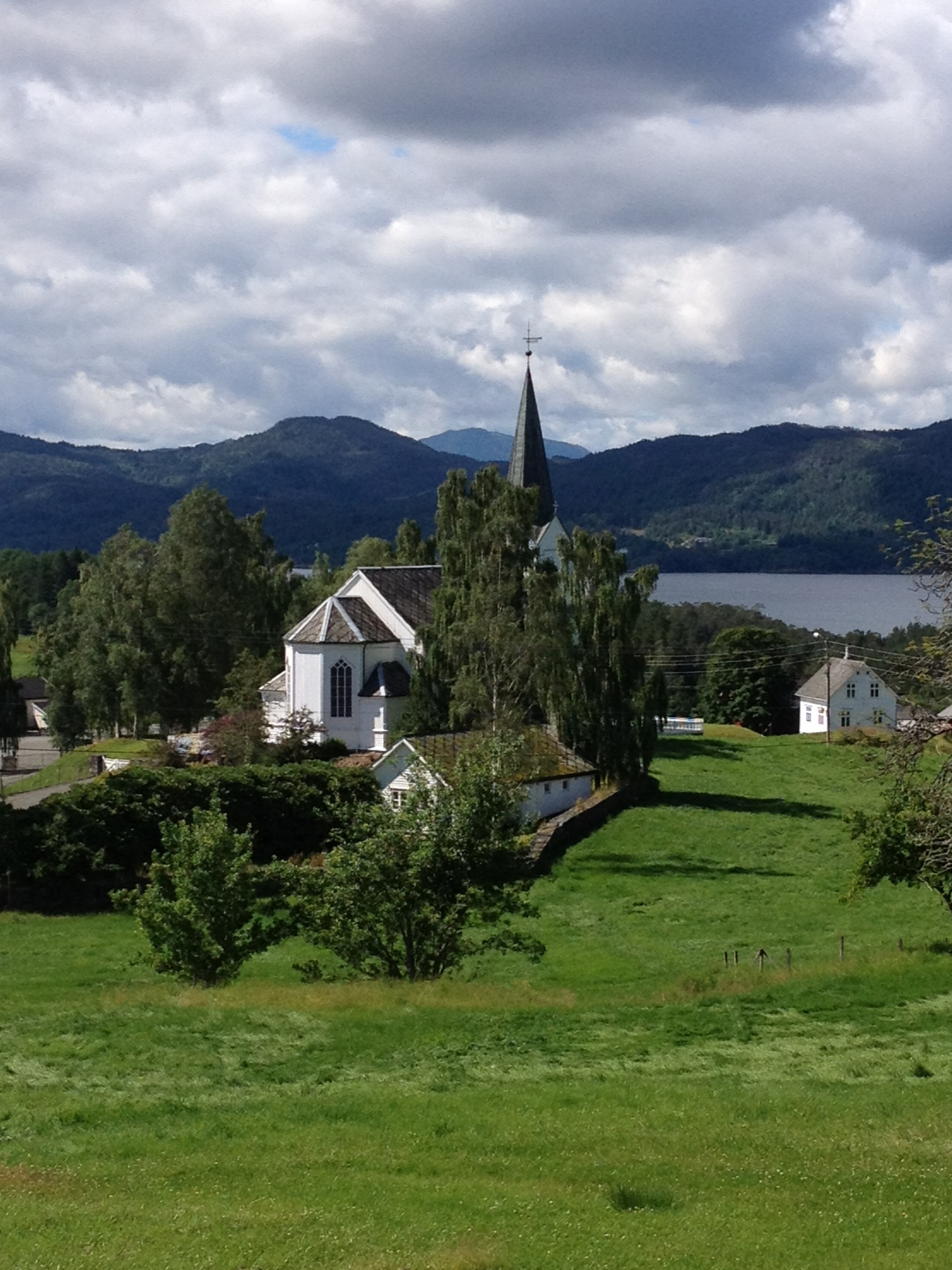
View of the church

There has been a church on Varaldsøy since the Middle Ages. The earliest existing historical records of the church date back to the year 1337, but it was not new at that time. The first church on the island of Varaldsøy was a wooden stave church that was likely built during the 13th century. The church is said to have had an open air corridor surrounding the building.

In 1724, the church was sold by the Crown to Ole Gjerdrum, the local parish priest. During the Norwegian church sale, the King sold hundreds of churches during this time to help pay for the costs of the Great Northern War. Shortly afterwards, in 1729, the old stave church was torn down and replaced by a new timber-framed long church on the same site. The church had a nave that measured about 9.4 by 7.5 metres (31 ft × 25 ft) and a choir that measured about 5 by 3.8 metres (16 ft × 12 ft). In 1873, the parish purchased the church back from private ownership at a cost of 615 Norwegian speciedaler.

In 1885, the church was torn down and a new church was built to replace it. The new church was constructed about 200 metres (660 ft) to the southwest of the old church site. This new church was consecrated on 25 November 1885 by the Bishop Waldemar Hvoslef. In 1970, the church underwent an extensive renovation.

== See also ==
- List of churches in Bjørgvin
