= Strandebarm Church =

Church in Vestland, Norway

- Strandebarm kyrkje
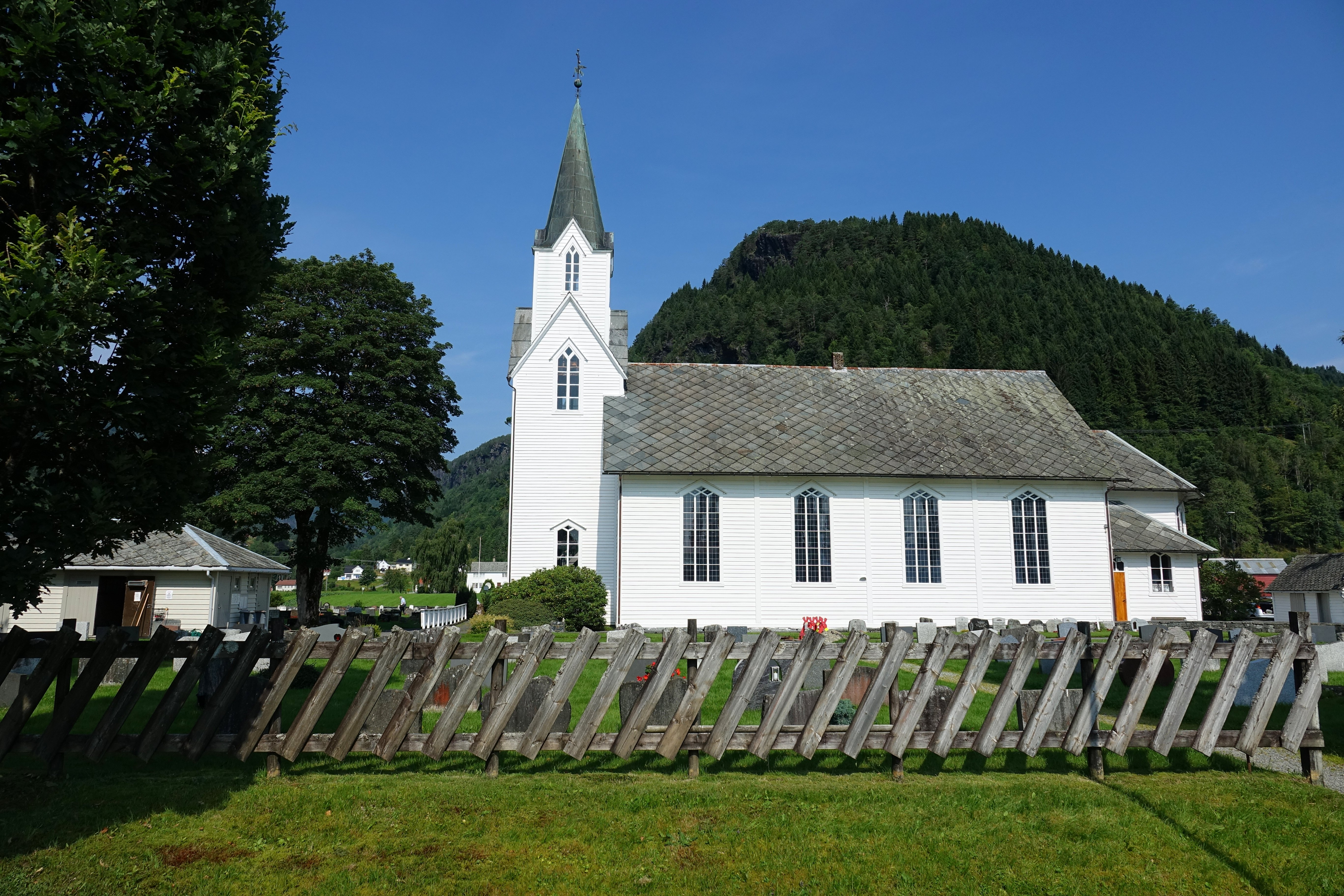
- View of the church
- Strandebarm Church
- 60°16′10″N 6°00′48″E
- Location: Kvam Municipality, Vestland
- Country: Norway
- Denomination: Church of Norway
- Previous denomination: Catholic Church
- Churchmanship: Evangelical Lutheran

History
- Status: Parish church
- Founded: 13th century
- Consecrated: 18 August 1876

Architecture
- Functional status: Active
- Architect: Ole Vangberg
- Architectural type: Long church
- Completed: 1876 (150 years ago)

Specifications
- Capacity: 550
- Materials: Wood

Administration
- Diocese: Bjørgvin bispedømme
- Deanery: Hardanger og Voss prosti
- Parish: Strandebarm
- Norwegian Cultural Heritage Site
- Type: Church
- Status: Listed
- ID: 85598

Strandebarm Church (Norwegian: Strandebarm kyrkje) is a parish church of the Church of Norway in Kvam Municipality in Vestland county, Norway. It is located in the village of Strandebarm. It is the church for the Strandebarm parish which is part of the Hardanger og Voss prosti (deanery) in the Diocese of Bjørgvin. The white, wooden church was built in a long church design in 1876 using plans drawn up by the architect Ole Vangberg. The church seats about 550 people. Historically, this was the main church for the old Strandebarm Municipality.

== History ==
The earliest existing historical records of the church date back to the year 1306, but the church was built before that time. The first church at Bru was a wooden stave church that was likely built in the 13th century. The first church was located on the shore of the river, about 60 metres (200 ft) to the west of the present church site. In 1659, there was a large fire and the medieval church and neighboring farm both burned down. A new timber-framed cruciform church was built on the same site between 1659 and 1661. In 1737, the church was sold to the magister Ole Gjerdrum. Later, it was sold back to the parish.

In 1814, this church served as an election church (Norwegian: valgkirke). Together with more than 300 other parish churches across Norway, it was a polling station for elections to the 1814 Norwegian Constituent Assembly which wrote the Constitution of Norway. This was Norway's first national elections. Each church parish was a constituency that elected people called "electors" who later met together in each county to elect the representatives for the assembly that was to meet at Eidsvoll Manor later that year.

By the 1870s, the old church was too small for the parish. In 1876, it was decided to tear down the old church and build a newer, larger church. The new church was to be built about 60 metres (200 ft) east of the old church site. The white, wooden church, which seats about 550 people, was designed by the architect Ole Vangberg. The new church has a nave that measures about 23.3 by 13.8 metres (76 ft × 45 ft) and a choir that measures about 7.7 by 7.2 metres (25 ft × 24 ft) and a church porch under the tower that measures about 5.4 by 4.8 metres (18 ft × 16 ft). The new church was consecrated on 18 August 1876. After the new church was completed, the old church was torn down.

== See also ==
- List of churches in Bjørgvin
