= Strandebarm Municipality =

Former municipality in Hordaland, Norway

Strandebarm Municipality Strandebarm herad
- Former municipality
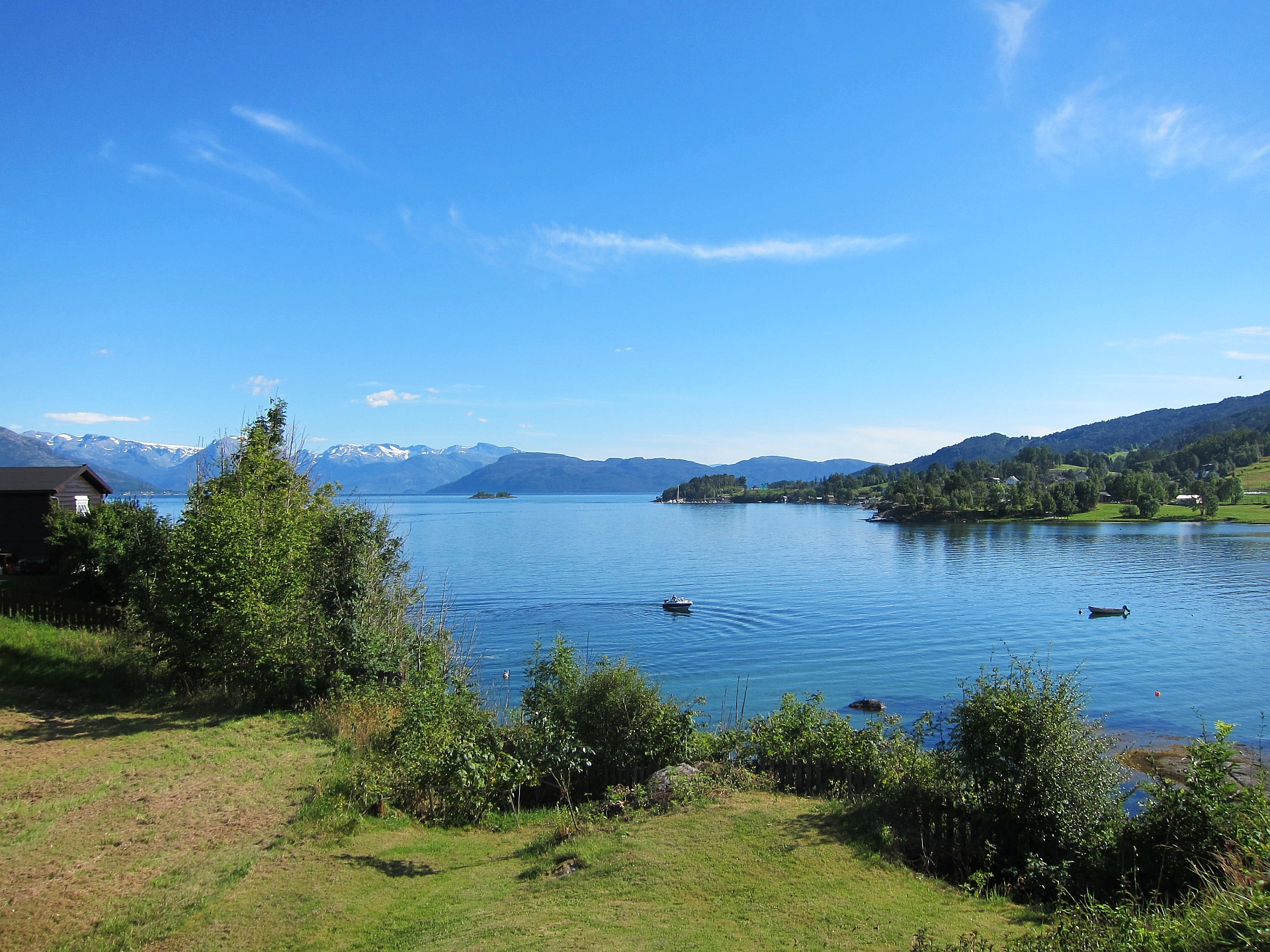
- View of the fjord from the village of Strandebarm

- Hordaland within Norway

- Strandebarm within Hordaland
- Coordinates: 60°17′N 06°01′E
- Country: Norway
- County: Hordaland
- District: Hardanger
- Established: 1 Jan 1838
  - Created as: Formannskapsdistrikt
- Disestablished: 1 Jan 1965
  - Succeeded by: Kvam Municipality and Jondal Municipality
- Administrative centre: Bru

Government
  - Mayor (1960-1964): Kristoffer Kolltveit (V)

Area (upon dissolution)
  - Total: 112.1 km^{2} (43.3 sq mi)
  - Rank: #410 in Norway
- Highest elevation: 1,299 m (4,262 ft)

Population (1964)
  - Total: 1,628
  - Rank: #440 in Norway
  - Density: 14.5/km^{2} (38/sq mi)
  - Change (10 years): ▼ −4.6%
- Demonym(s): Strandberming; Strandeberming

Official language
  - Norwegian form: Nynorsk
- Time zone: UTC+01:00 (CET)
  - Summer (DST): UTC+02:00 (CEST)
- ISO 3166 code: NO-1226

Strandebarm is a former municipality in the old Hordaland county, Norway. The 112.1-square-kilometre (43.3 sq mi) municipality existed from 1838 until its dissolution in 1965. The area is now divided between Kvam Municipality and Ullensvang Municipality in the traditional district of Hardanger in Vestland county. The administrative centre was the village of Bru (also known as Strandebarm. Other villages in the municipality included Kysnesstranda, Omastranda, and Innstranda.

Prior to its dissolution in 1965, the 112.1-square-kilometre (43.3 sq mi) municipality was the 410th largest by area out of the 525 municipalities in Norway. Strandebarm Municipality was the 440th most populous municipality in Norway with a population of about 1,628. The municipality's population density was 14.5 inhabitants per square kilometre (38/sq mi) and its population had decreased by 4.6% over the previous 10-year period.

One of the larger industries in the municipality was shipbuilding, centered at the village of Omastranda, where the company Fjellstrand A.S. was headquartered.

== General information ==
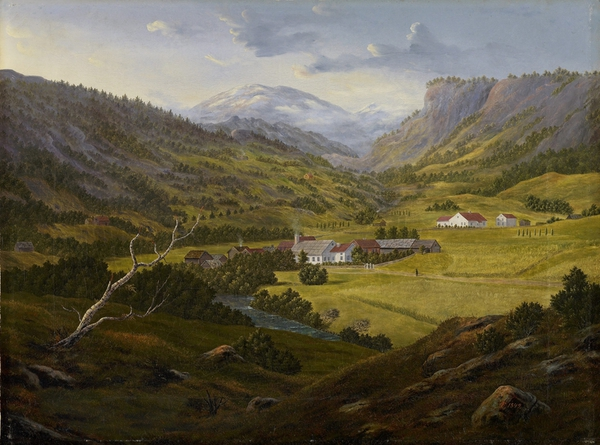
Painting of the parsonage farm in Strandebarm Credit: Tycho Jæger

The parish of Strandebarm was established as a municipality on 1 January 1838 (see formannskapsdistrikt law). On 1 January 1863, Strandebarm Municipality was divided into two: most of the land located on the eastern shore of the Hardangerfjorden, except for Kysnesstranda, (population: 1,663) became the new Jondal Municipality and the remaining parts (population: 2,200) continued as a smaller Strandebarm Municipality.

Then on 1 January 1902, Strandebarm Municipality was divided into two municipalities: the southern district (population: 848) became the new Varaldsøy Municipality and the rest of the municipality (population: 1,661) continued as a smaller Strandebarm Municipality.

During the 1960s, there were many municipal mergers across Norway due to the work of the Schei Committee. On 1 January 1965, Strandebarm Municipality ceased to exist. The district of Kysnesstranda (population: 100) on the east side of the fjord was incorporated into Jondal Municipality. The rest of Strandebarm (population: 1,545) was incorporated into Kvam Municipality to the north.

=== Name ===
The municipality (originally the parish) is named after the local Strandebarmsbukta bay (Old Norse: Strandarbarmr). The first element is the genitive case of strǫnd which means "beach" or "shore". The last element is barmr which means "rim", here referring to the area along the bay.

=== Churches ===
The Church of Norway had one parish (sokn) within Strandebarm Municipality. At the time of the municipal dissolution, it was part of the Strandebarm prestegjeld and the Hardanger og Voss prosti (deanery) in the Diocese of Bjørgvin.

Churches in Strandebarm Municipality
Parish (sokn)	Church name	Location of the church	Year built
Strandebarm	Strandebarm Church	Strandebarm	1876

== Geography ==
The municipality spanned land on both sides of the central part of the Hardangerfjorden. It also originally included the island of Varaldsøy (but that later became part of Varaldsøy Municipality). The highest point in the municipality was the 1,299-metre (4,262 ft) tall mountain Tveitakvitingen, a quadripoint on the border between Strandebarm Municipality, Kvam Municipality, Samnanger Municipality, and Hålandsdal Municipality.

Kvam Municipality was located to the north, Jondal Municipality was located to the east, Kvinnherad Municipality was located to the southeast, Varaldsøy Municipality was located to the south, and Hålandsdal Municipality was located to the west.

== Government ==
While it existed, Strandebarm Municipality was responsible for primary education (through 10th grade), outpatient health services, senior citizen services, welfare and other social services, zoning, economic development, and municipal roads and utilities. The municipality was governed by a municipal council of directly elected representatives. The mayor was indirectly elected by a vote of the municipal council. The municipality was under the jurisdiction of the Gulating Court of Appeal.

=== Municipal council ===
The municipal council (Heradsstyre) of Strandebarm Municipality was made up of representatives that were elected to four year terms. The tables below show the historical composition of the council by political party.

Strandebarm heradsstyre 1963–1965
Party name (in Nynorsk)	Number of representatives
Labour Party (Arbeidarpartiet)	2
Conservative Party (Høgre)	1
Christian Democratic Party (Kristeleg Folkeparti)	3
Centre Party (Senterpartiet)	3
Liberal Party (Venstre)	4
Total number of members:	13
Note: On 1 January 1965, Strandebarm Municipality was divided between Jondal Municipality and Kvam Municipality.

Strandebarm heradsstyre 1959–1963
Party name (in Nynorsk)	Number of representatives
Labour Party (Arbeidarpartiet)	2
Conservative Party (Høgre)	1
Christian Democratic Party (Kristeleg Folkeparti)	2
Centre Party (Senterpartiet)	3
Liberal Party (Venstre)	5
Total number of members:	13

Strandebarm heradsstyre 1955–1959
Party name (in Nynorsk)	Number of representatives
Labour Party (Arbeidarpartiet)	2
Christian Democratic Party (Kristeleg Folkeparti)	3
Farmers' Party (Bondepartiet)	3
Liberal Party (Venstre)	2
Local List(s) (Lokale lister)	3
Total number of members:	13

Strandebarm heradsstyre 1951–1955
Party name (in Nynorsk)	Number of representatives
Labour Party (Arbeidarpartiet)	2
Christian Democratic Party (Kristeleg Folkeparti)	3
Farmers' Party (Bondepartiet)	2
Liberal Party (Venstre)	5
Total number of members:	12

Strandebarm heradsstyre 1947–1951
Party name (in Nynorsk)	Number of representatives
Labour Party (Arbeidarpartiet)	2
Christian Democratic Party (Kristeleg Folkeparti)	3
Joint List(s) of Non-Socialist Parties (Borgarlege Felleslister)	7
Total number of members:	12

Strandebarm heradsstyre 1945–1947
Party name (in Nynorsk)	Number of representatives
Labour Party (Arbeidarpartiet)	3
Christian Democratic Party (Kristeleg Folkeparti)	2
Local List(s) (Lokale lister)	7
Total number of members:	12

Strandebarm heradsstyre 1937–1941*
Party name (in Nynorsk)	Number of representatives
Labour Party (Arbeidarpartiet)	3
Joint List(s) of Non-Socialist Parties (Borgarlege Felleslister)	9
Total number of members:	12
Note: Due to the German occupation of Norway during World War II, no elections were held for new municipal councils until after the war ended in 1945.

=== Mayors ===
The mayor (Nynorsk: ordførar) of Strandebarm Municipality was the political leader of the municipality and the chairperson of the municipal council. The following people have held this position:

- 1838–1843: Niels Burggraf Tausan
- 1844–1850: Niels Landmark
- 1851–1853: Torbjørn Røyrvik
- 1854–1857: Caspar Kährs
- 1858–1858: Jens Andreas Holmboe
- 1858–1858: Niels Landmark
- 1858–1859: Nils T. Linge
- 1860–1861: Torbjørn T. Linge (V)
- 1862–1863: Mathias Bonsak Krogh Holst
- 1864–1867: Nils T. Linge
- 1868–1871: Torbjørn T. Linge
- 1872–1875: Nils T. Linge
- 1876–1882: Arne Berge (MV)
- 1882–1885: Lars Galtung
- 1886–1901: Amund Fosse
- 1902–1907: Thomas Enes
- 1908–1916: Johannes Ugletvedt
- 1917–1921: Haktor Dysvik
- 1921–1943: Håvard Berge
- 1943–1945: Peder Oma (NS)
- 1945–1945: Johannes Riise
- 1946–1955: Kristoffer Kolltveit (V)
- 1956–1959: Erling Bruhjell (Bp)
- 1960–1964: Kristoffer Kolltveit (V)

== Notable people ==
- Jon Fosse, an author, playwright and Nobel Laureate who grew up in Standebarm
- Hans E. Kinck, a Norwegian writer who lived in Strandebarm for many years. He is said to have used the village as the setting and inspiration for his novel Den nye kapellanen ("The New Vicar").

== See also ==
- List of former municipalities of Norway
