= Eikelandsosen =

Village in Bjørnafjorden Municipality, Norway

- Village
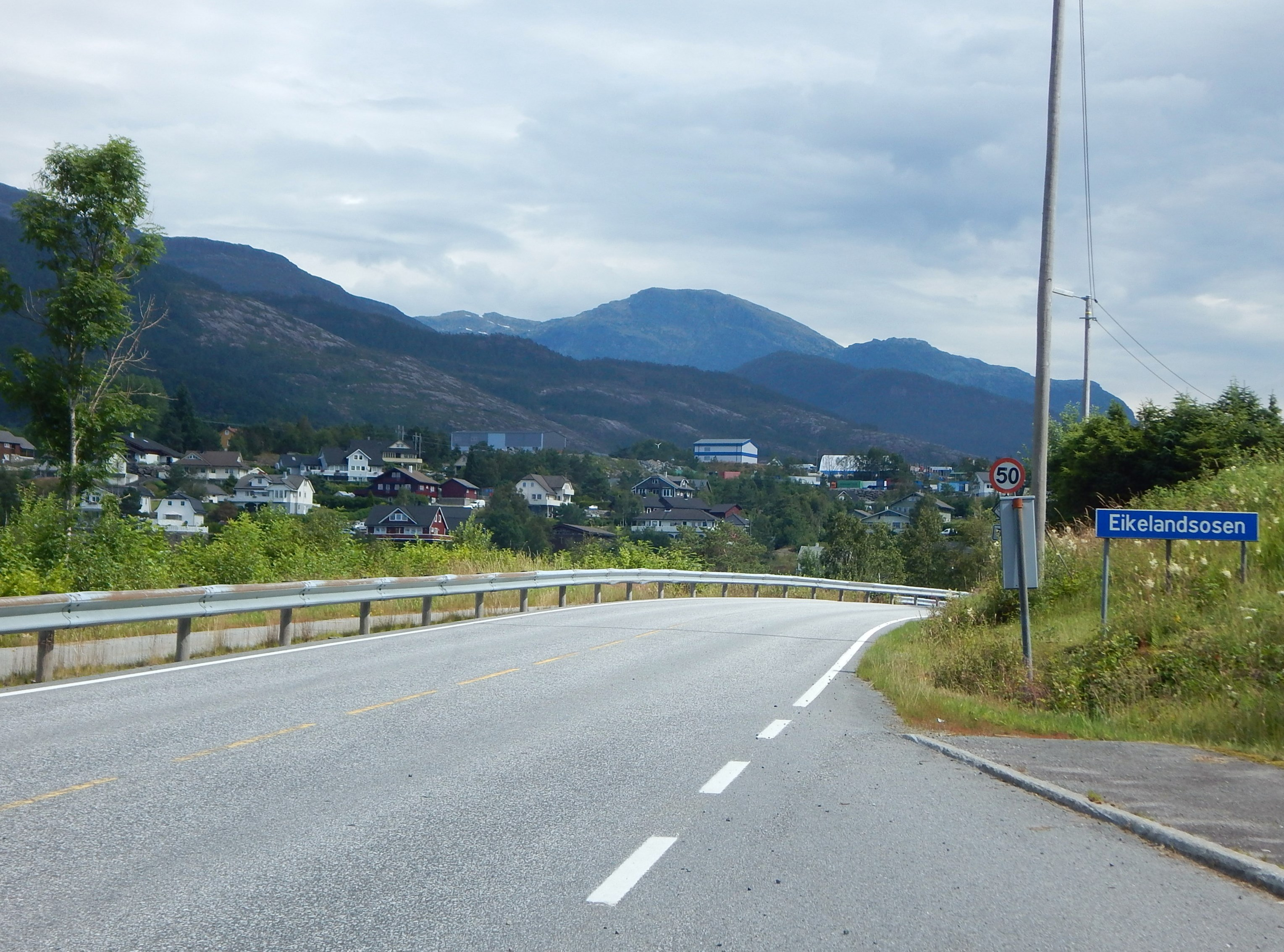
- View of the village
- Interactive map of Eikelandsosen
- Coordinates: 60.24175°N 5.74433°E
- Country: Norway
- Region: Western Norway
- County: Vestland
- District: Midhordland
- Municipality: Bjørnafjorden Municipality

Area
  - Total: 0.8 km^{2} (0.31 sq mi)
- Elevation: 5 m (16 ft)

Population (2025)
  - Total: 537
  - Density: 671/km^{2} (1,740/sq mi)
- Time zone: UTC+01:00 (CET)
  - Summer (DST): UTC+02:00 (CEST)
- Post Code: 5640 Eikelandsosen

Eikelandsosen is a village in Bjørnafjorden Municipality in Vestland county, Norway. It is located at the end of the Eikelandsfjorden, a small arm off the main Fusafjorden. The village sits to the southeast of the village of Holmefjord, west of the village of Holdhus, and northeast of the village of Fusa.

The 0.8-square-kilometre (200-acre) village has a population (2025) of 537 and a population density of 671 inhabitants per square kilometre (1,740/sq mi).

== History ==
The village was the administrative center of the old Fusa Municipality prior to its dissolution in 2020.
