= Fusa Church =

Church in Vestland, Norway

- Fusa kyrkje
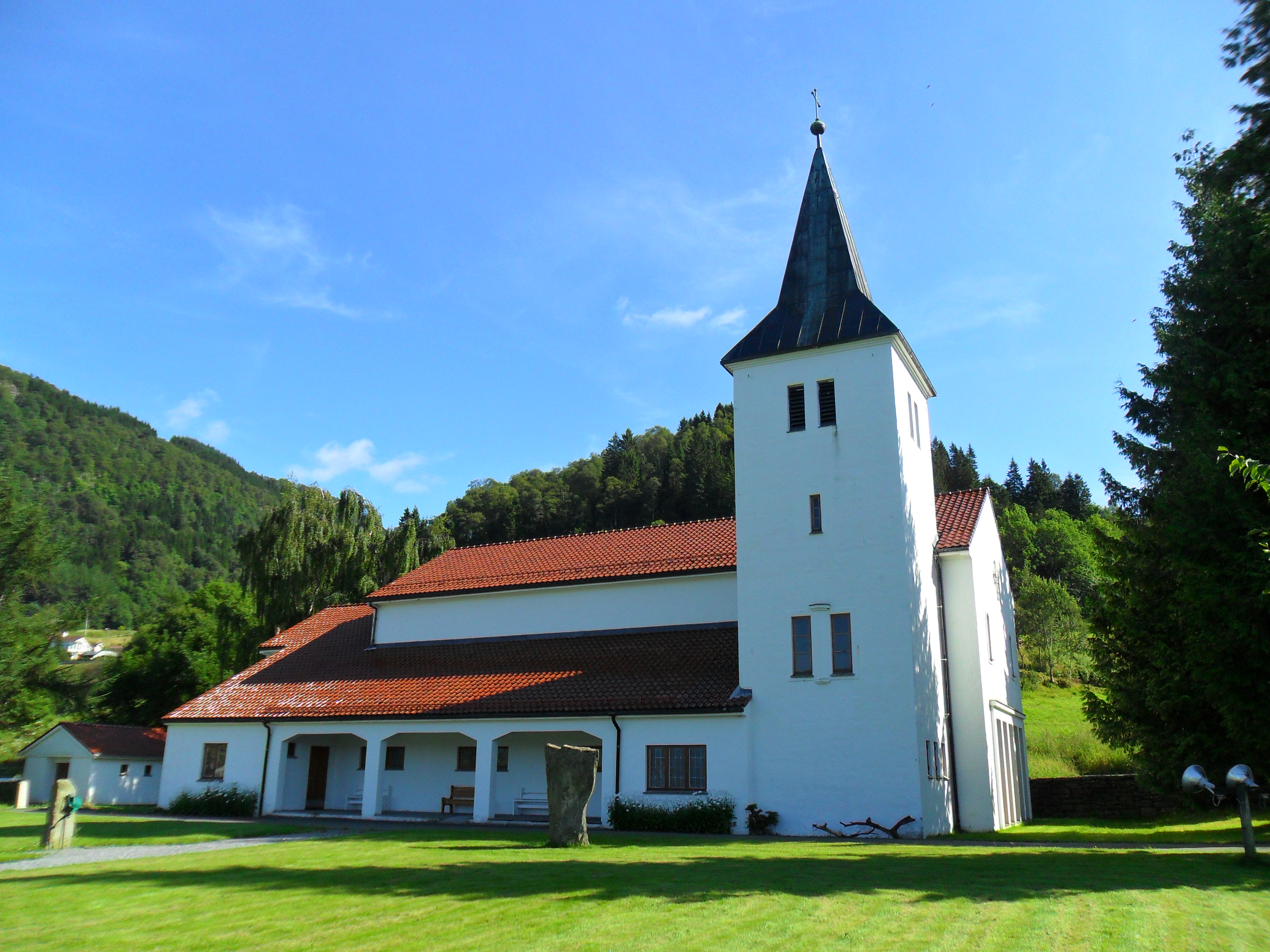
- View of the church
- Fusa Church
- 60°12′13″N 5°37′27″E
- Location: Bjørnafjorden, Vestland
- Country: Norway
- Denomination: Church of Norway
- Previous denomination: Catholic Church
- Churchmanship: Evangelical Lutheran

History
- Status: Parish church
- Founded: 13th century
- Consecrated: 2 Sep 1962

Architecture
- Functional status: Active
- Architect: Ole Halvorsen
- Architectural type: Long church
- Completed: 1962 (64 years ago)

Specifications
- Capacity: 350
- Materials: Concrete

Administration
- Diocese: Bjørgvin bispedømme
- Deanery: Fana prosti
- Parish: Fusa
- Norwegian Cultural Heritage Site
- Type: Church
- Status: Not listed
- ID: 84215

Fusa Church (Norwegian: Fusa kyrkje) is a parish church of the Church of Norway in Bjørnafjorden Municipality in Vestland county, Norway. It is located in the village of Fusa. It is one of the churches for the Fusa parish which is part of the Fana prosti (deanery) in the Diocese of Bjørgvin. The white, concrete church was built in a long church design in 1962 using plans drawn up by the architect Ole Halvorsen. The church seats about 350 people. It is the fourth church building to be built on this site.

== History ==
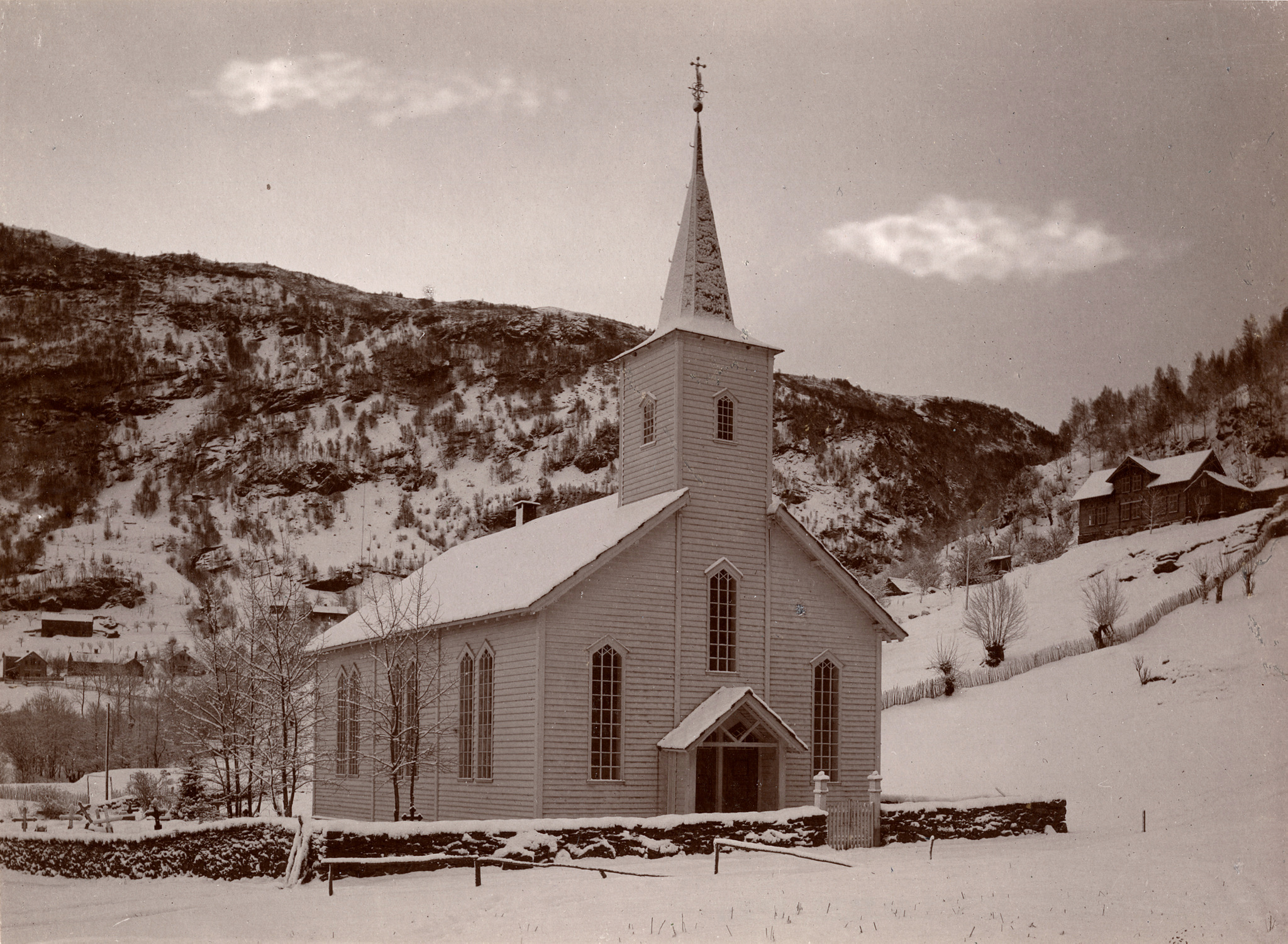
View of the old church (before 1959)

The earliest existing historical records of the church date back to the year 1325, but the church was not new that year. The first church in Fusa was a wooden stave church that was likely built during the 13th century. In the year 1600, the old church was torn down and a new timber-framed long church was built on the same site to replace it. In 1861, a new, larger church was built about 50 metres (160 ft) to the west of the old church. The new building was designed by Frederik Hannibal Stockfleth and the lead builder was Johannes Øvsthus. The new church was consecrated on 24 November 1861. After the new church was completed, the old church was torn down and its parts were sold at auction.

On Sunday, 11 January 1959, shortly after the worship service, the church caught fire and burned to the ground. Immediately, the parish set out to rebuild the church. Ole Halvorsen was hired to design the new church which would be built on the same site as the previous church building. The new building was consecrated on 2 September 1962.

In 2014, the church was transferred to the Hardanger og Voss prosti when the old Midhordland prosti was dissolved. In 2017, the church was transferred to the Fana prosti in anticipation of a municipal merger in 2020.

== See also ==
- List of churches in Bjørgvin
