= Varaldsøy =

Island in Norway

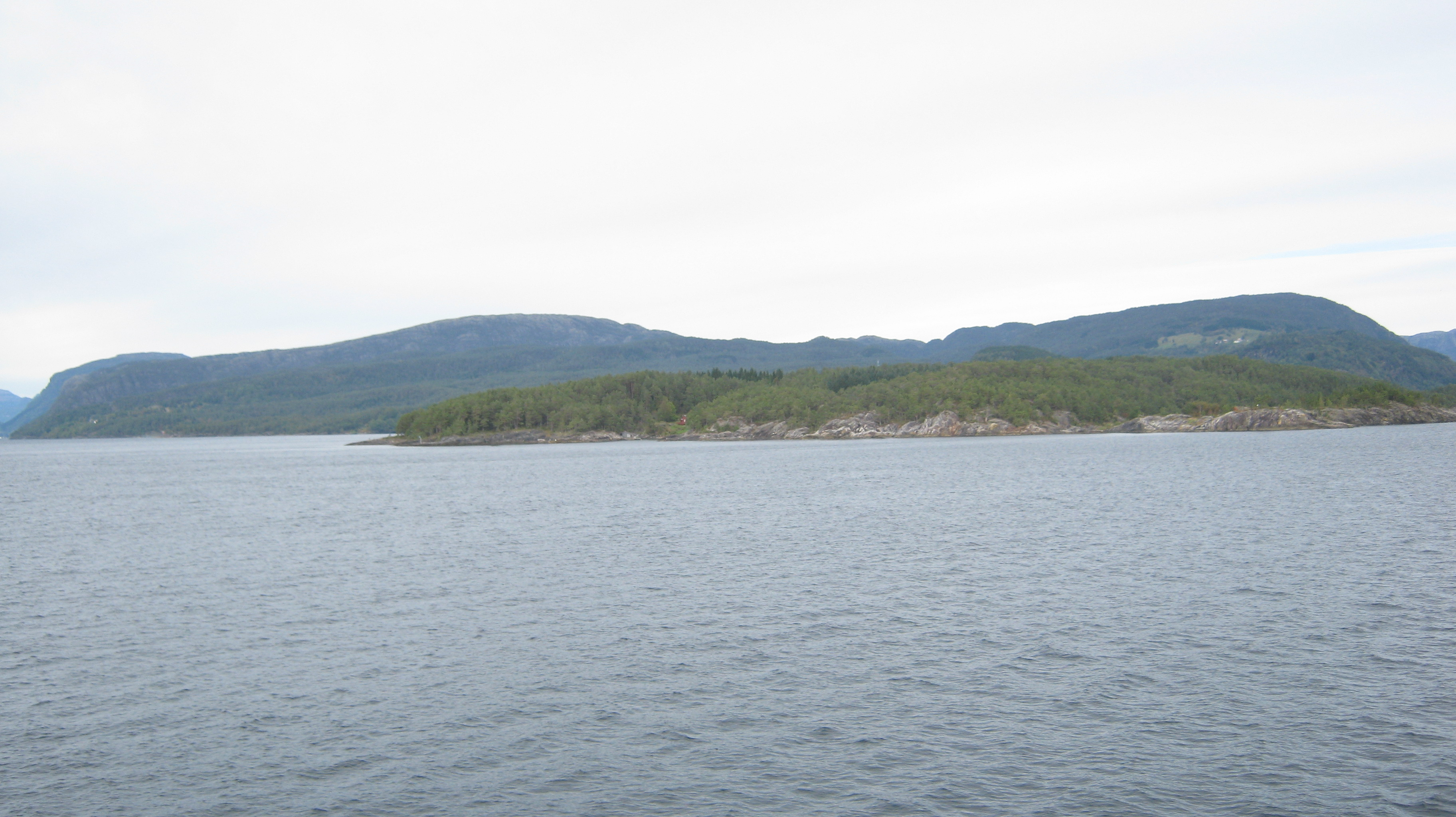
- Varaldsøy seen from the south
- Interactive map of the island

Geography
- Location: Vestland, Norway
- Coordinates: 60.1288°N 5.9893°E
- Area: 45.4 km^{2} (17.5 sq mi)
- Highest elevation: 600 m (2000 ft)
- Highest point: Øyefjellet

Administration
- Norway
- County: Vestland
- Municipality: Kvinnherad Municipality

Demographics
- Population: 184 (2024)

Varaldsøy is an island (and village) in Kvinnherad Municipality in Vestland county, Norway. The 45.4-square-kilometre (17.5 sq mi) island is the largest island in the Hardangerfjorden. Most of the inhabitants live on the southern tip of the island in the village of Varaldsøy, where Varaldsøy Church is located. The 600-metre (2,000 ft) tall mountain Øyefjellet is the highest point on the island.

== History ==
The island was historically a part of Strandebarm Municipality until 1902 when it was transferred to the new Varaldsøy Municipality. The island made up the majority of the municipality (plus some of the mainland to the west and north). In 1965, Varaldsøy Municipality was dissolved in a period of municipal consolidations in Norway. The island was then transferred to Kvinnherad Municipality.

== See also ==
- List of islands of Norway
