= Strandvik Church =

Church in Vestland, Norway

- Strandvik kyrkje
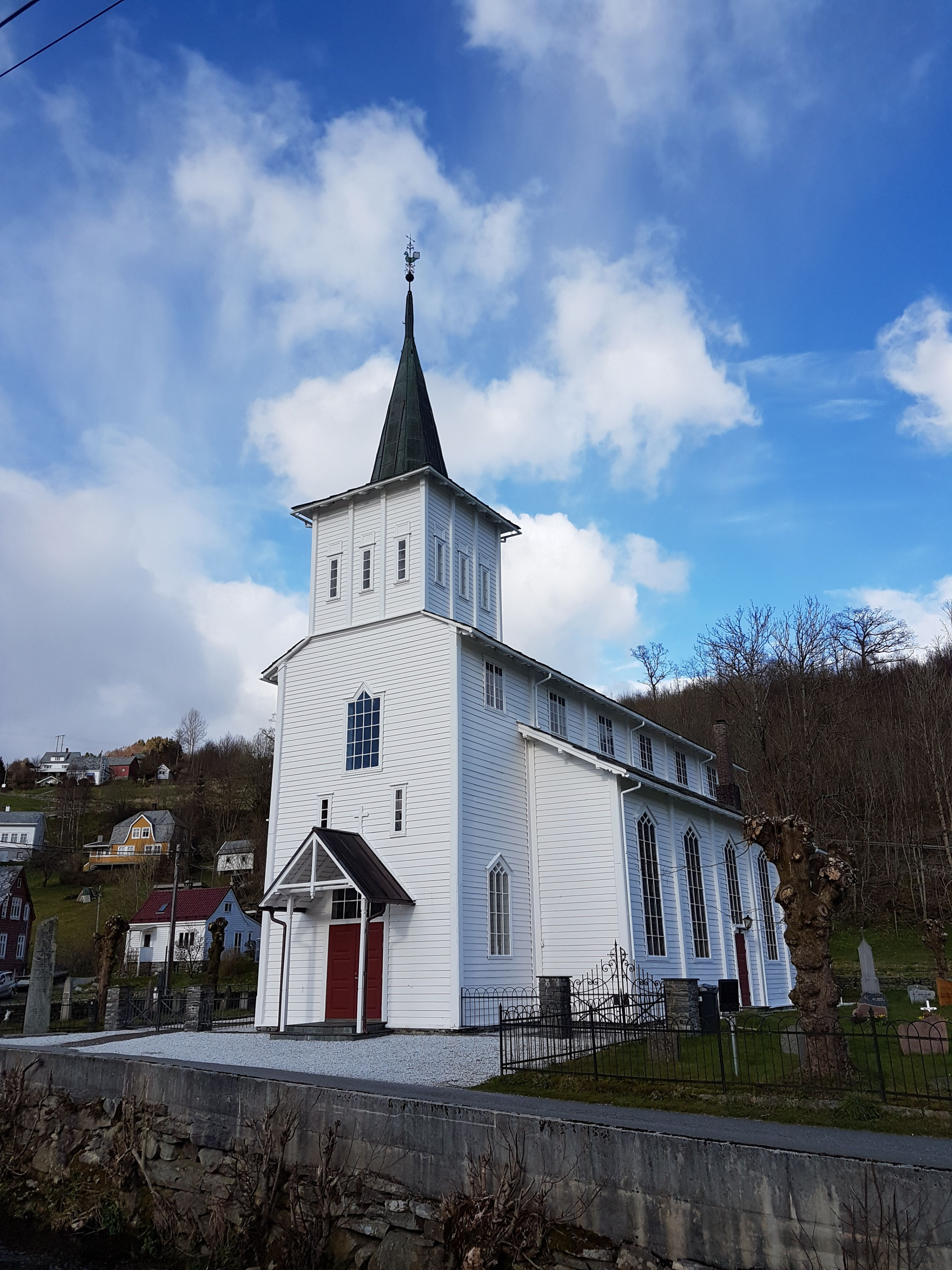
- View of the church
- Strandvik Church
- 60°09′34″N 5°40′02″E
- Location: Bjørnafjorden, Vestland
- Country: Norway
- Denomination: Church of Norway
- Previous denomination: Catholic Church
- Churchmanship: Evangelical Lutheran

History
- Status: Parish church
- Founded: 13th century
- Consecrated: 1857

Architecture
- Functional status: Active
- Architect: Frederik Stockfleth
- Architectural type: Long church
- Completed: 1857 (169 years ago)

Specifications
- Capacity: 450
- Materials: Wood

Administration
- Diocese: Bjørgvin bispedømme
- Deanery: Fana prosti
- Parish: Fusa
- Norwegian Cultural Heritage Site
- Type: Church
- Status: Listed
- ID: 85601

Strandvik Church (Norwegian: Strandvik kyrkje) is a parish church of the Church of Norway in Bjørnafjorden Municipality in Vestland county, Norway. It is located in the village of Strandvik. It is one of the churches for the Fusa parish which is part of the Fana prosti (deanery) in the Diocese of Bjørgvin. The white, wooden church was built in a long church design in 1857 using plans drawn up by the architect Frederik Hannibal Stockfleth. The church seats about 450 people.

== History ==
There has been a church at Strandvik since the Middle Ages. The earliest existing historical records of the church date back to the year 1263, but that was not the year of construction. The first church in Strandvik was a wooden stave church that was likely built in the early 13th century. After the Reformation, the church was described in written records as having towers and a corridor encircling the building. In 1621–1623, the church was in need of some big repairs including fixing the roof and parts of the foundation and supports. The repairs were a temporary fix, however, because the church was still not in great shape and it was in need of replacement. In 1628, the church was torn down to make room for a new timber-framed long church on the same site. In 1691, a new spire with a weather vane was installed on top of the tower. In 1725, the church was sold to private owners.

In 1853, an agreement was made between the private church owners and the parish that the church owners should pay for the construction of a new church in Strandvik. This new church was designed by Frederik Hannibal Stockfleth and the lead builder was Johannes Øvsthus. In 1857, a new, much larger church was built just to the north of the old church. After the new church was completed, the old church was torn down. In 1870, the church was purchased from its private owners by the municipality for 2000 speciedaler. In 1883, the church was partially remodeled by changing the ceiling inside the nave. Before the rebuilding in 1883, the inside of the church appeared as a "real" basilica with an elevated nave ceiling and lower aisle ceilings on either side. Both nave and aisles then had flat ceilings. During the installation of the nave's barrel vault ceiling in 1883, the basilica character disappeared. Some of the second floor seating galleries were removed during the renovation as well.

== See also ==
- List of churches in Bjørgvin
