= Strandebarm, Vestland =

Village in Kvam Municipality, Norway

Strandebarm Ploganes / Bru
- Village
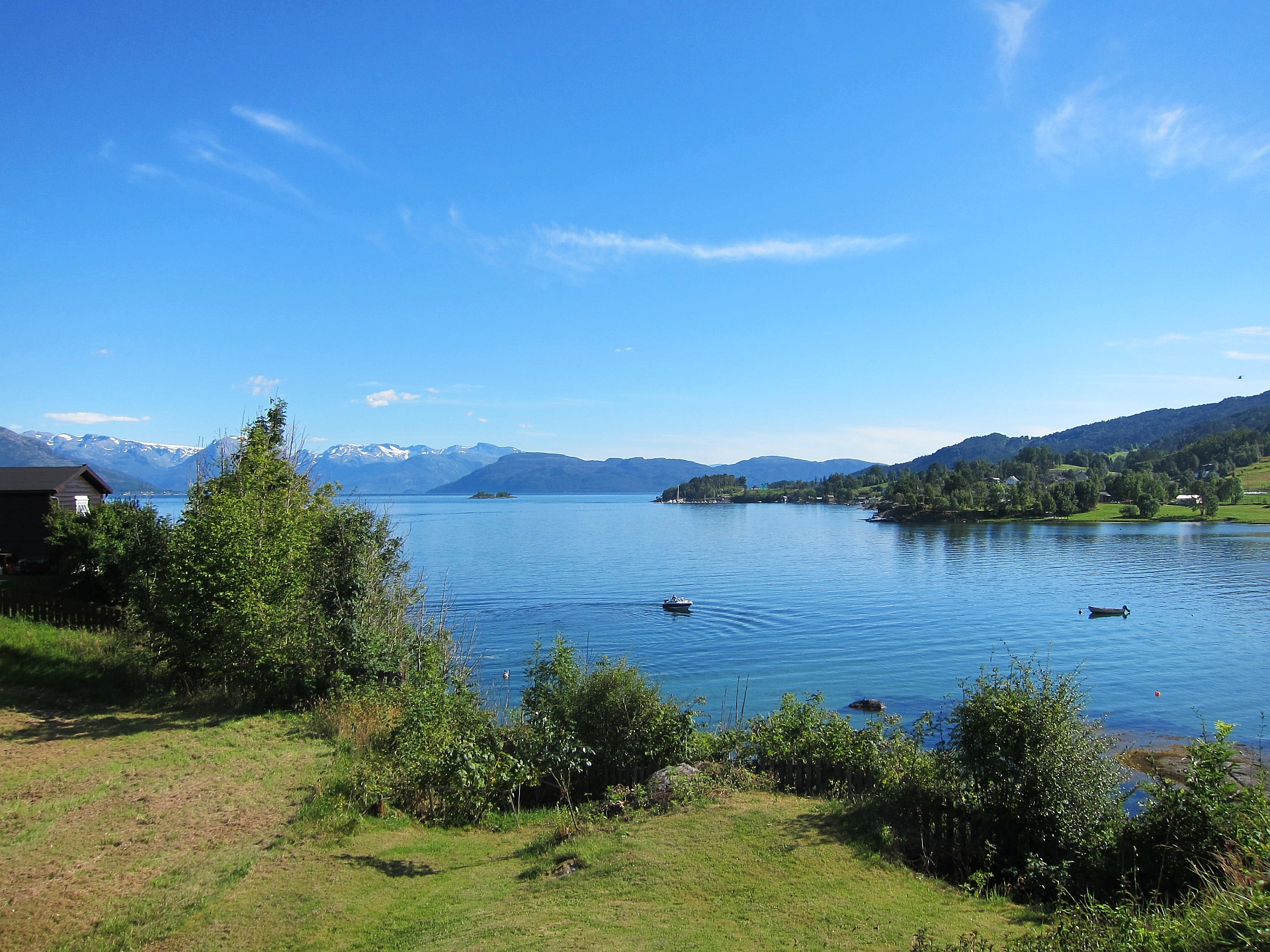
- View of the fjord from Strandebarm
- Interactive map of Strandebarm
- Coordinates: 60.27089°N 6.01157°E
- Country: Norway
- Region: Western Norway
- County: Vestland
- District: Hardanger
- Municipality: Kvam Municipality

Area
  - Total: 0.97 km^{2} (0.37 sq mi)
- Elevation: 5 m (16 ft)

Population (2025)
  - Total: 389
  - Density: 401/km^{2} (1,040/sq mi)
- Time zone: UTC+01:00 (CET)
  - Summer (DST): UTC+02:00 (CEST)
- Post Code: 5630 Strandebarm

Strandebarm (also known as Ploganes or Bru) is a village in Kvam Municipality in Vestland county, Norway. It is located on the northern shore of the Hardangerfjorden about 13 kilometres (8.1 mi) southwest of the village of Tørvikbygd, about 6 kilometres (3.7 mi) north of the village of Omastranda, and about 10 kilometres (6.2 mi) northwest (across the fjord) from the village of Kysnesstranda in Ullensvang Municipality. Strandebarm Church is located in the village.

The 0.97-square-kilometre (240-acre) village has a population (2025) of 389 and a population density of 401 inhabitants per square kilometre (1,040/sq mi).

== History ==
This village (known as Bru) was the administrative centre of the old Strandebarm Municipality from 1838 until 1965 when the municipality was dissolved and this area was merged into Kvam Municipality.
