= Os Municipality (Hordaland) =

Former municipality in Hordaland, Norway

Os Municipality Os kommune
- Former municipality
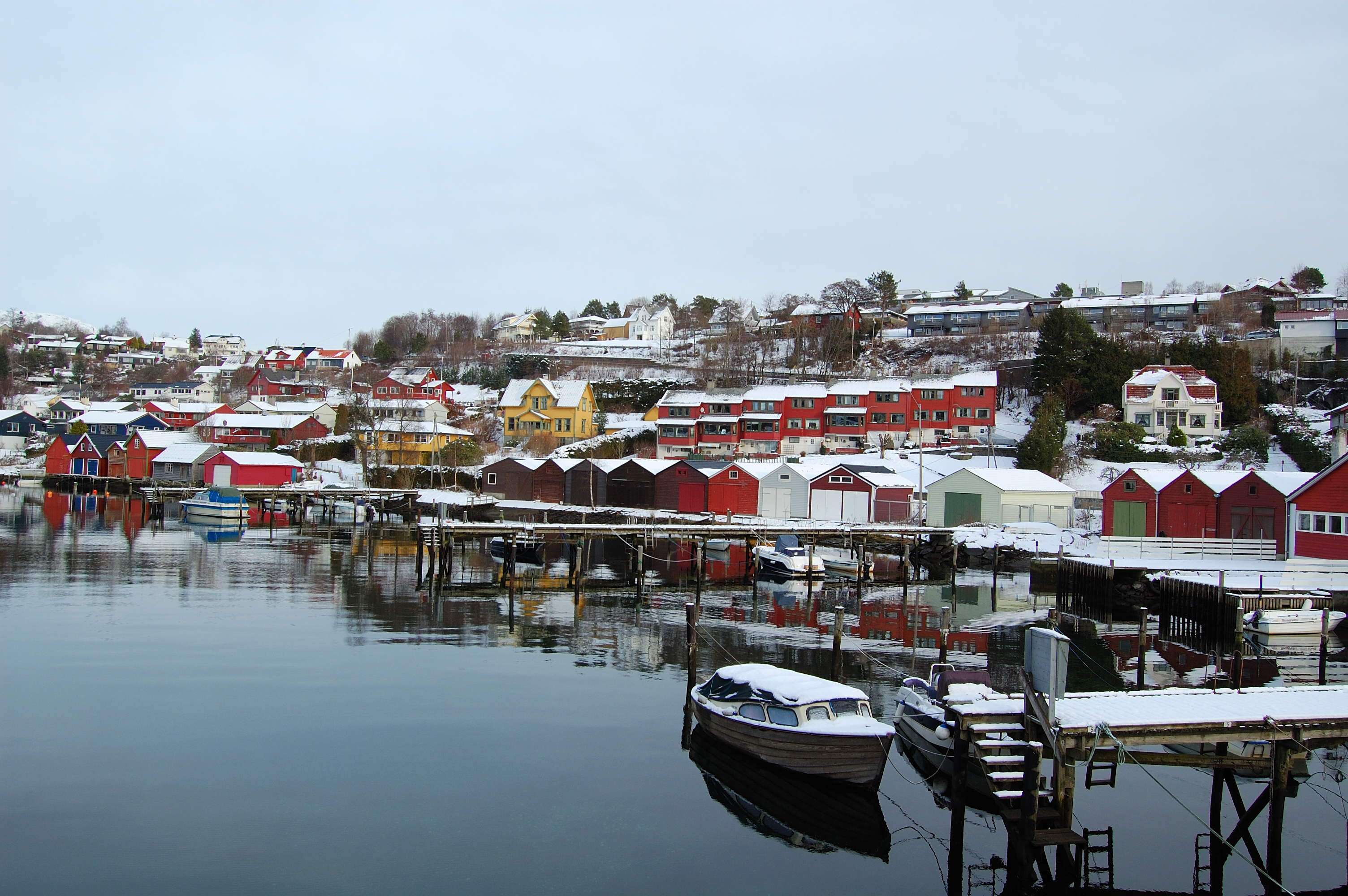
- View of Osøyro

- Coat of arms

- Hordaland within Norway

- Os within Hordaland
- Coordinates: 60°13′37″N 05°28′33″E
- Country: Norway
- County: Hordaland
- District: Midhordland
- Established: 1 Jan 1838
  - Created as: Formannskapsdistrikt
- Disestablished: 1 Jan 2020
  - Succeeded by: Bjørnafjorden Municipality
- Administrative centre: Osøyro

Government
  - Mayor (2018–2019): Terje Søviknes (FrP)

Area (upon dissolution)
  - Total: 139.58 km^{2} (53.89 sq mi)
  - Land: 133.51 km^{2} (51.55 sq mi)
  - Water: 6.07 km^{2} (2.34 sq mi) 4.3%
  - Rank: #360 in Norway
- Highest elevation: 842.6 m (2,764 ft)

Population (2019)
  - Total: 20,804
  - Rank: #56 in Norway
  - Density: 149/km^{2} (390/sq mi)
  - Change (10 years): ▲ +26.6%
- Demonym: Osing

Official language
  - Norwegian form: Nynorsk
- Time zone: UTC+01:00 (CET)
  - Summer (DST): UTC+02:00 (CEST)
- ISO 3166 code: NO-1243

Os (Nynorsk: [uːs]) is a former municipality in the old Hordaland county, Norway. The 139.58-square-kilometre (53.89 sq mi) municipality existed from 1838 until its dissolution in 2020. The area is now part of Bjørnafjorden Municipality in the traditional district of Midhordland in Vestland county, just south of Norway's second-largest city, Bergen. The administrative centre was the village of Osøyro. Other villages in the municipality included Hagavik, Haljem, Syfteland, Søre Øyane, and Søvik.

Prior to its dissolution in 2020, the 139.58-square-kilometre (53.89 sq mi) municipality was the 360th largest by area out of the 422 municipalities in Norway. Os Municipality was the 149th most populous municipality in Norway with a population of about 20,804. The municipality's population density was 149 inhabitants per square kilometre (390/sq mi) and its population had increased by 26.6% over the previous 10-year period.

== History ==
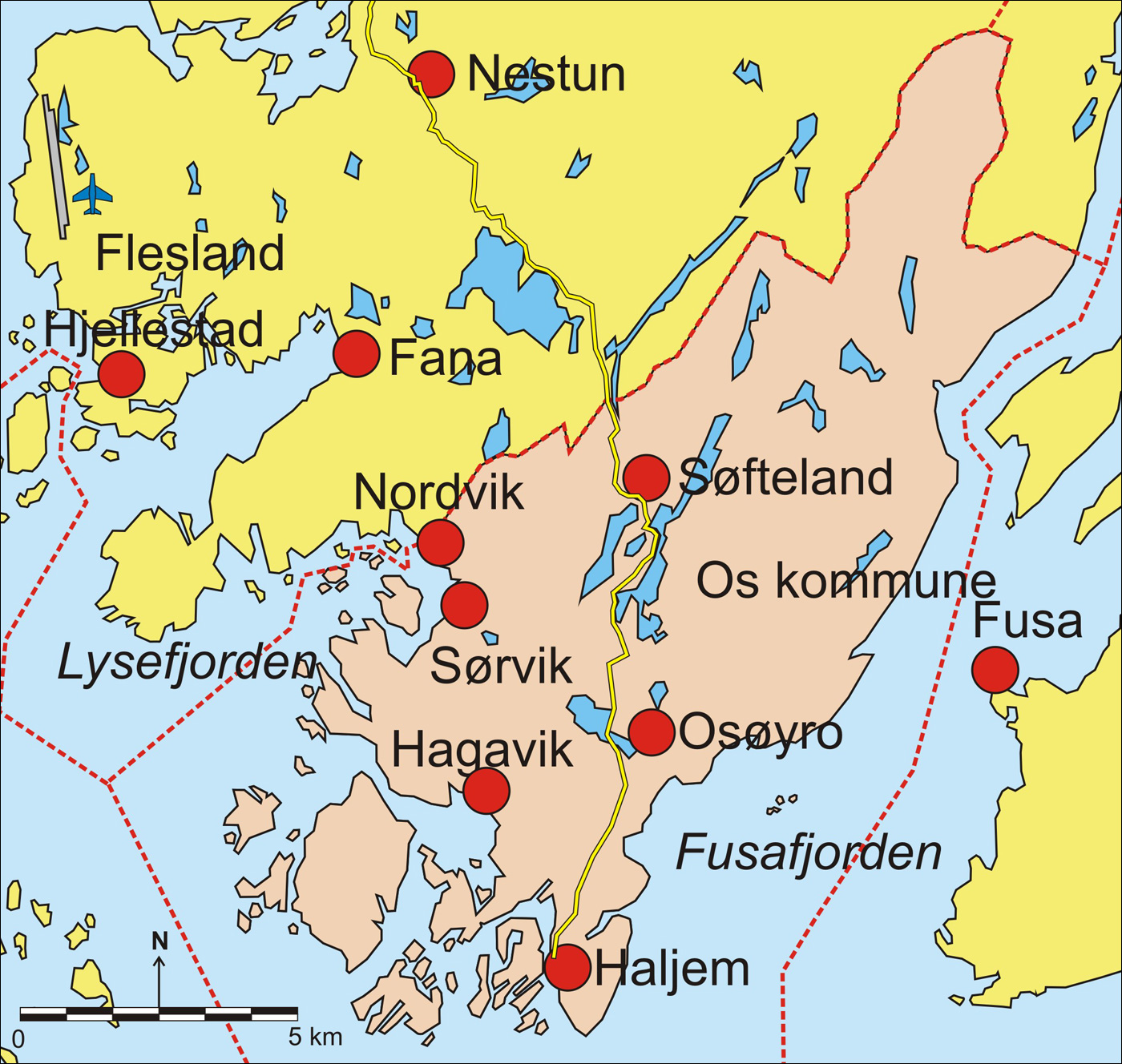
Map of Os

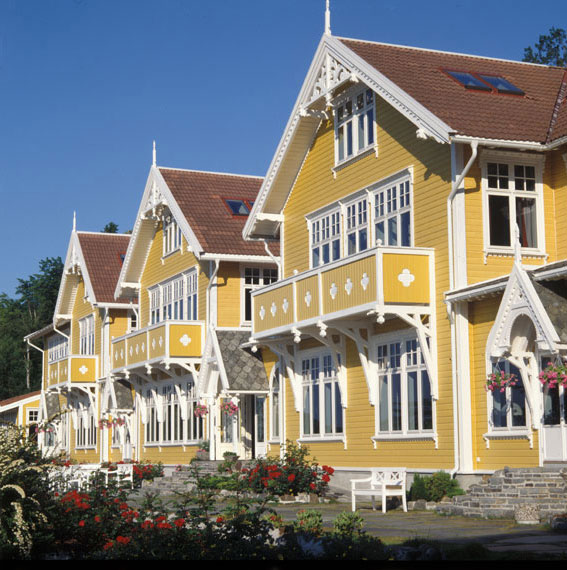
Solstrand Hotel in Osøyro

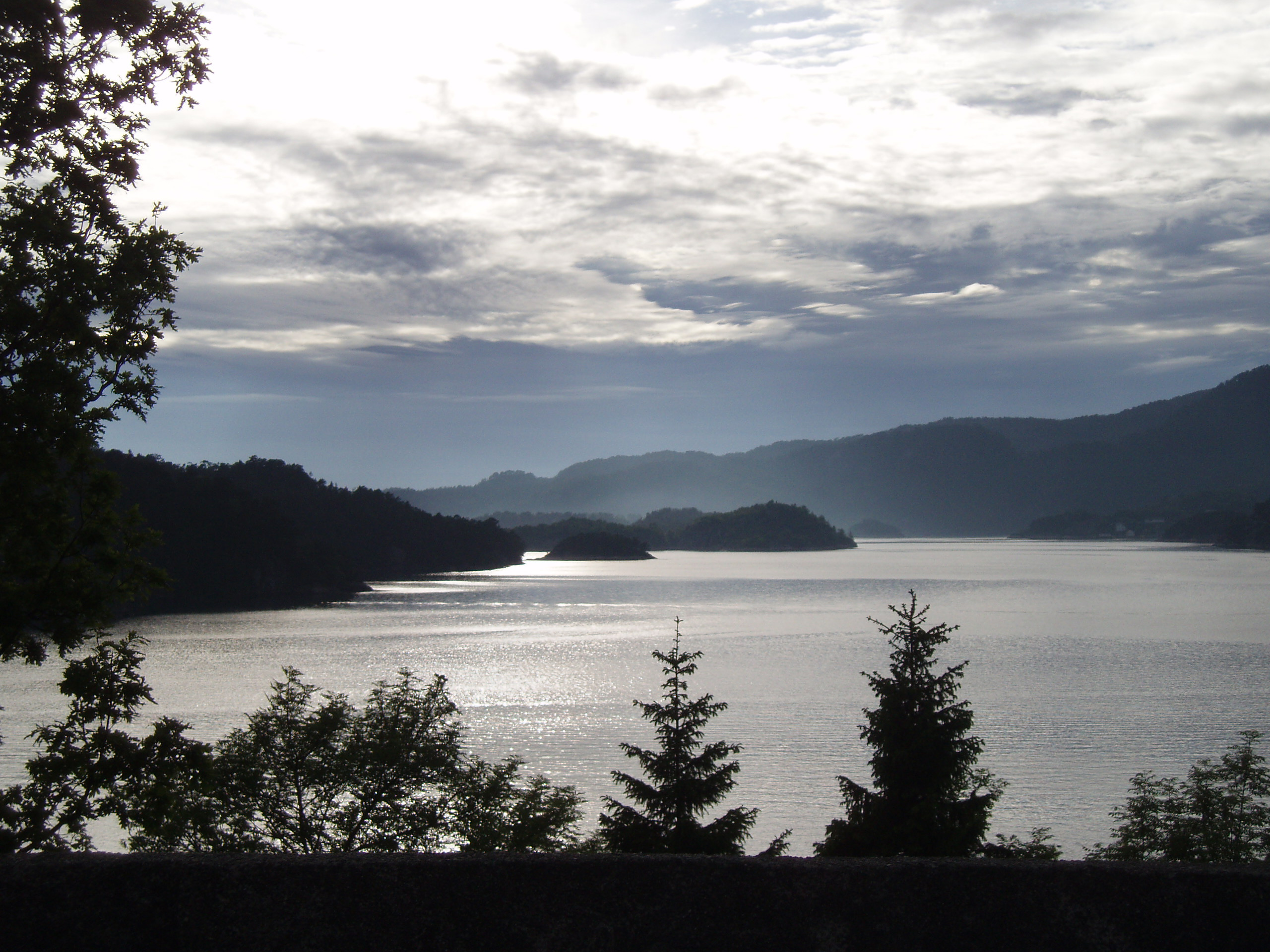
View of the Lysefjorden in Os

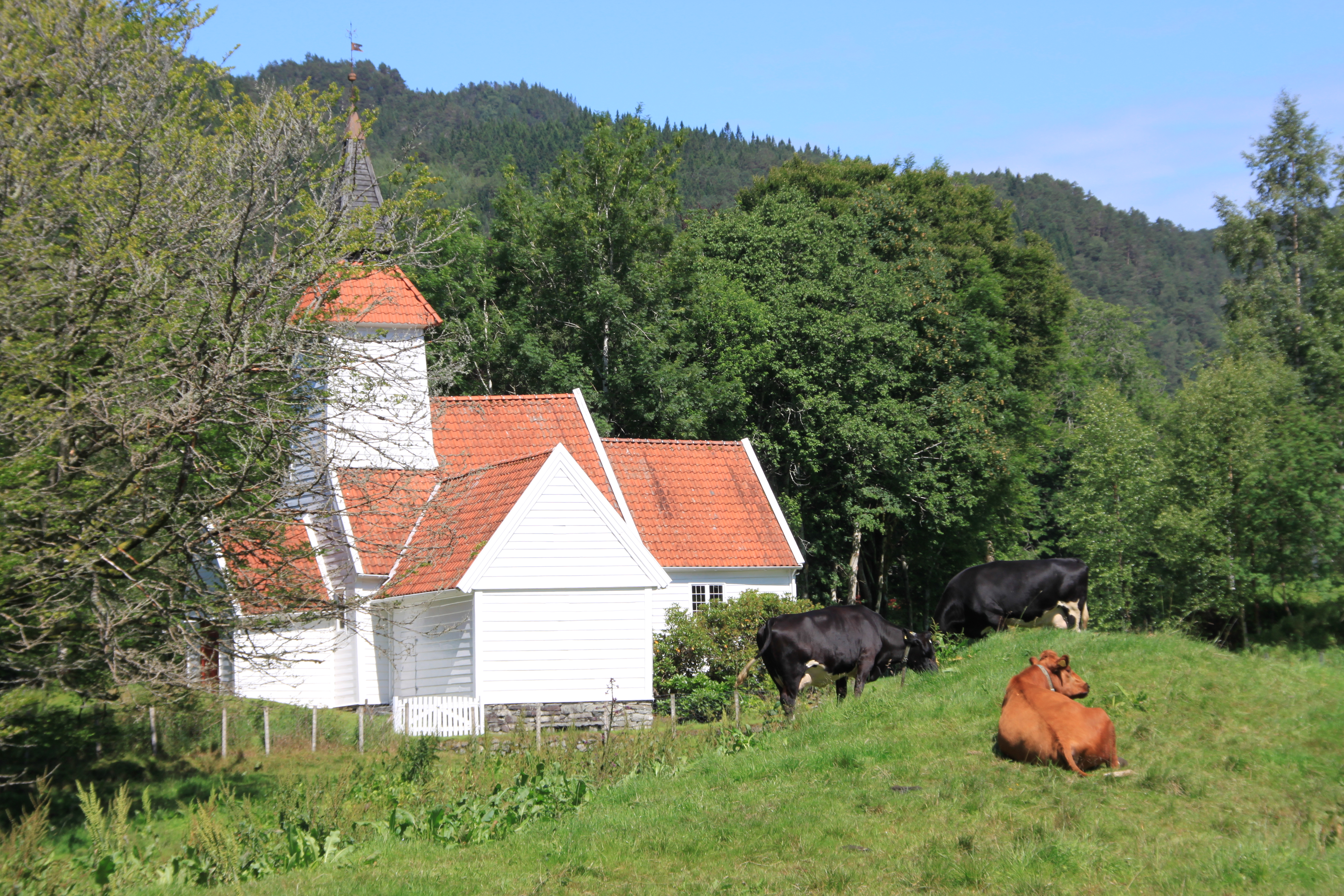
Lysekloster Chapel

The parish of Os was established on 1 January 1838 as a formannskapsdistrikt, the predecessor of today's municipalities. It originally encompassed all of the land surrounding the Fusafjorden. In 1856, the eastern district of Os (across the fjord) was separated to form the new Fusa Municipality. This left Os Municipality with 3,750 residents.

In 1900, "Askviknes Barnehjem" (near Hagavik) opened; it housed children of romani/tater descent; in the beginning the children's stay was something their families applied for; later children were introduced to the facility without consent of their families.

On 1 January 1907, the northern part of the municipality was separated to form the new Samnanger Municipality. This left Os Municipality with 3,188 residents.

During World War II, the Ulven concentration camp was used by the occupying Nazi German Army. It was located just northwest of Osøyro.

During the 1960s, there were many municipal mergers across Norway due to the work of the Schei Committee. On 1 January 1964, the Bogstrand area of Fusa Municipality (population: 28) was transferred to Os Municipality. This small area was the only part of Fusa Municipality located on the west side of the fjord.

On 1 January 2020, Os Municipality and Fusa Municipality were merged to form the new Bjørnafjorden Municipality. Historically, this municipality was part of the old Hordaland county. Also on 1 January 2020, the new Bjørnafjorden Municipality became a part of the newly-formed Vestland county (after Hordaland and Sogn og Fjordane counties were merged).

=== Name ===
The municipality (originally the parish) is named after the old Os farm (Old Norse: Óss) since the first Os Church was built there. The name is identical to the word óss which means "mouth of a river", referring here to the Oselva river.

=== Coat of arms ===
The coat of arms was adopted in 1949 and it was in use until 1 January 2020 when the municipality was dissolved. The blazon is "Gules, one large and six small roses over a rowboat Or". This means the arms have a red field (background) and the charge is a rowboat underneath a flower and six small stars surrounding the flower. The charge has a tincture of Or which means it is commonly colored yellow, but if it is made out of metal, then gold is used. The arms were adopted in 1949 after a local competition. Boat building has been an important industry in Os for a long time. The rowboat design was chosen to symbolize the Oselvar boat which is commonly built and used in this area. The Oselvar is widely known for its good rowing and sailing properties. The roses in the coat of arms stand for the art of rosemåling which has long been used for decorations in the area. The small roses in the design corresponded to the number of school districts in Os when the coat of arms was new. The municipality often includes a mural crown over the shield. The arms were designed by Trygve Eriksen.

== Churches ==
The Church of Norway had one parish (sokn) within Os Municipality. It is part of the Fana prosti (deanery) in the Diocese of Bjørgvin.

Churches in Os Municipality
Parish (sokn)	Church name	Location of the church	Year built
Os	Os Church	Osøyro	1870
Os	Nore Neset Church	Hagavik	2000

== Government ==
While it existed, Os Municipality was responsible for primary education (through 10th grade), outpatient health services, senior citizen services, welfare and other social services, zoning, economic development, and municipal roads and utilities. The municipality was governed by a municipal council of directly elected representatives. The mayor was indirectly elected by a vote of the municipal council. The municipality was under the jurisdiction of the Bergen District Court and the Gulating Court of Appeal.

=== Municipal council ===
The municipal council (Kommunestyre) of Os Municipality was made up of 35 representatives that were elected to four year terms. The party breakdown of the final municipal council was as follows:

Os kommunestyre 2015–2019
Party name (in Nynorsk)	Number of representatives
Labour Party (Arbeidarpartiet)	7
Progress Party (Framstegspartiet)	14
Green Party (Miljøpartiet Dei Grøne)	2
Conservative Party (Høgre)	4
Christian Democratic Party (Kristeleg Folkeparti)	2
Centre Party (Senterpartiet)	2
Liberal Party (Venstre)	2
Cross-party local list for Os (Tverrpolitisk Bygdeliste for Os)	2
Total number of members:	35
Note: On 1 January 2020, Os Municipality and Fusa Municipality were merged to form the new Bjørnafjorden Municipality.

Os kommunestyre 2011–2015
Party name (in Nynorsk)	Number of representatives
Labour Party (Arbeidarpartiet)	7
Progress Party (Framstegspartiet)	13
Conservative Party (Høgre)	6
Christian Democratic Party (Kristeleg Folkeparti)	2
Centre Party (Senterpartiet)	1
Liberal Party (Venstre)	2
Cross-party local list for Os (Tverrpolitisk Bygdeliste for Os)	4
Total number of members:	35

Os kommunestyre 2007–2011
Party name (in Nynorsk)	Number of representatives
Labour Party (Arbeidarpartiet)	5
Progress Party (Framstegspartiet)	17
Conservative Party (Høgre)	4
Christian Democratic Party (Kristeleg Folkeparti)	2
Centre Party (Senterpartiet)	1
Socialist Left Party (Sosialistisk Venstreparti)	1
Liberal Party (Venstre)	1
Cross-party common list - local list for Os (Tverrpolitisk samlingsliste – bygdaliste for Os)	4
Total number of members:	35

Os kommunestyre 2003–2007
Party name (in Nynorsk)	Number of representatives
Labour Party (Arbeidarpartiet)	5
Progress Party (Framstegspartiet)	16
Conservative Party (Høgre)	3
Christian Democratic Party (Kristeleg Folkeparti)	3
Centre Party (Senterpartiet)	1
Socialist Left Party (Sosialistisk Venstreparti)	3
Liberal Party (Venstre)	1
Cross-Party Common List (Tverrpolitisk samlingsliste)	3
Total number of members:	35

Os kommunestyre 1999–2003
Party name (in Nynorsk)	Number of representatives
Labour Party (Arbeidarpartiet)	6
Progress Party (Framstegspartiet)	14
Conservative Party (Høgre)	4
Christian Democratic Party (Kristeleg Folkeparti)	4
Centre Party (Senterpartiet)	1
Socialist Left Party (Sosialistisk Venstreparti)	2
Cross-Party Common List (Tverrpolitisk samlingsliste)	4
Total number of members:	35

Os kommunestyre 1995–1999
Party name (in Nynorsk)	Number of representatives
Labour Party (Arbeidarpartiet)	7
Progress Party (Framstegspartiet)	7
Conservative Party (Høgre)	4
Christian Democratic Party (Kristeleg Folkeparti)	3
Centre Party (Senterpartiet)	2
Socialist Left Party (Sosialistisk Venstreparti)	1
Liberal Party (Venstre)	1
Common list for Os (Samlingslista for Os)	5
Cross-party local list for Os (Tverrpolitisk bygdeliste for Os)	5
Total number of members:	35

Os kommunestyre 1991–1995
Party name (in Nynorsk)	Number of representatives
Labour Party (Arbeidarpartiet)	6
Progress Party (Framstegspartiet)	4
Conservative Party (Høgre)	5
Christian Democratic Party (Kristeleg Folkeparti)	3
Centre Party (Senterpartiet)	2
Socialist Left Party (Sosialistisk Venstreparti)	2
Common list for Os (Samlingslista for Os)	6
Cross-party local list for Os (Tverrpolitisk bygdeliste for Os)	7
Total number of members:	35

Os kommunestyre 1987–1991
Party name (in Nynorsk)	Number of representatives
Labour Party (Arbeidarpartiet)	9
Progress Party (Framstegspartiet)	5
Conservative Party (Høgre)	6
Christian Democratic Party (Kristeleg Folkeparti)	2
Centre Party (Senterpartiet)	1
Liberal Party (Venstre)	2
Common list for Os (Samlingslista for Os)	6
Cross-party local list for Os (Tverrpolitisk bygdeliste for Os)	4
Total number of members:	35

Os kommunestyre 1983–1987
Party name (in Nynorsk)	Number of representatives
Labour Party (Arbeidarpartiet)	8
Progress Party (Framstegspartiet)	3
Conservative Party (Høgre)	8
Christian Democratic Party (Kristeleg Folkeparti)	3
Centre Party (Senterpartiet)	1
Liberal Party (Venstre)	2
Common list for Os (Samlingslista for Os)	10
Total number of members:	35

Os kommunestyre 1979–1983
Party name (in Nynorsk)	Number of representatives
Labour Party (Arbeidarpartiet)	8
Progress Party (Framstegspartiet)	1
Conservative Party (Høgre)	12
Christian Democratic Party (Kristeleg Folkeparti)	4
Centre Party (Senterpartiet)	2
Liberal Party (Venstre)	2
Common list for Os (Samlingslista for Os)	6
Total number of members:	35

Os kommunestyre 1975–1979
Party name (in Nynorsk)	Number of representatives
Labour Party (Arbeidarpartiet)	8
Conservative Party (Høgre)	7
Christian Democratic Party (Kristeleg Folkeparti)	3
New People's Party (Nye Folkepartiet)	2
Centre Party (Senterpartiet)	2
Liberal Party (Venstre)	1
Common list for Os (Samlingslista for Os)	6
Total number of members:	29

Os kommunestyre 1971–1975
Party name (in Nynorsk)	Number of representatives
Labour Party (Arbeidarpartiet)	10
Conservative Party (Høgre)	3
Christian Democratic Party (Kristeleg Folkeparti)	3
Centre Party (Senterpartiet)	3
Liberal Party (Venstre)	4
Local List(s) (Lokale lister)	6
Total number of members:	29

Os kommunestyre 1967–1971
Party name (in Nynorsk)	Number of representatives
Labour Party (Arbeidarpartiet)	10
Conservative Party (Høgre)	2
Christian Democratic Party (Kristeleg Folkeparti)	3
Centre Party (Senterpartiet)	3
Liberal Party (Venstre)	3
Joint List(s) of Non-Socialist Parties (Borgarlege Felleslister)	2
Local List(s) (Lokale lister)	6
Total number of members:	29

Os kommunestyre 1963–1967
Party name (in Nynorsk)	Number of representatives
Labour Party (Arbeidarpartiet)	10
Conservative Party (Høgre)	3
Christian Democratic Party (Kristeleg Folkeparti)	4
Centre Party (Senterpartiet)	2
Liberal Party (Venstre)	4
Local List(s) (Lokale lister)	6
Total number of members:	29

Os heradsstyre 1959–1963
Party name (in Nynorsk)	Number of representatives
Labour Party (Arbeidarpartiet)	11
Conservative Party (Høgre)	3
Christian Democratic Party (Kristeleg Folkeparti)	5
Centre Party (Senterpartiet)	3
Liberal Party (Venstre)	6
Local List(s) (Lokale lister)	1
Total number of members:	29

Os heradsstyre 1955–1959
Party name (in Nynorsk)	Number of representatives
Labour Party (Arbeidarpartiet)	12
Conservative Party (Høgre)	2
Christian Democratic Party (Kristeleg Folkeparti)	4
Farmers' Party (Bondepartiet)	4
Liberal Party (Venstre)	5
Local List(s) (Lokale lister)	2
Total number of members:	29

Os heradsstyre 1951–1955
Party name (in Nynorsk)	Number of representatives
Labour Party (Arbeidarpartiet)	9
Christian Democratic Party (Kristeleg Folkeparti)	4
Farmers' Party (Bondepartiet)	3
Liberal Party (Venstre)	5
Local List(s) (Lokale lister)	3
Total number of members:	24

Os heradsstyre 1947–1951
Party name (in Nynorsk)	Number of representatives
Labour Party (Arbeidarpartiet)	9
Christian Democratic Party (Kristeleg Folkeparti)	4
Farmers' Party (Bondepartiet)	3
Liberal Party (Venstre)	5
Local List(s) (Lokale lister)	3
Total number of members:	24

Os heradsstyre 1945–1947
Party name (in Nynorsk)	Number of representatives
Labour Party (Arbeidarpartiet)	12
Christian Democratic Party (Kristeleg Folkeparti)	4
Local List(s) (Lokale lister)	8
Total number of members:	24

Os heradsstyre 1937–1941*
Party name (in Nynorsk)	Number of representatives
Labour Party (Arbeidarpartiet)	5
Farmers' Party (Bondepartiet)	3
Joint List(s) of Non-Socialist Parties (Borgarlege Felleslister)	4
Local List(s) (Lokale lister)	4
Total number of members:	16
Note: Due to the German occupation of Norway during World War II, no elections were held for new municipal councils until after the war ended in 1945.

=== Mayors ===
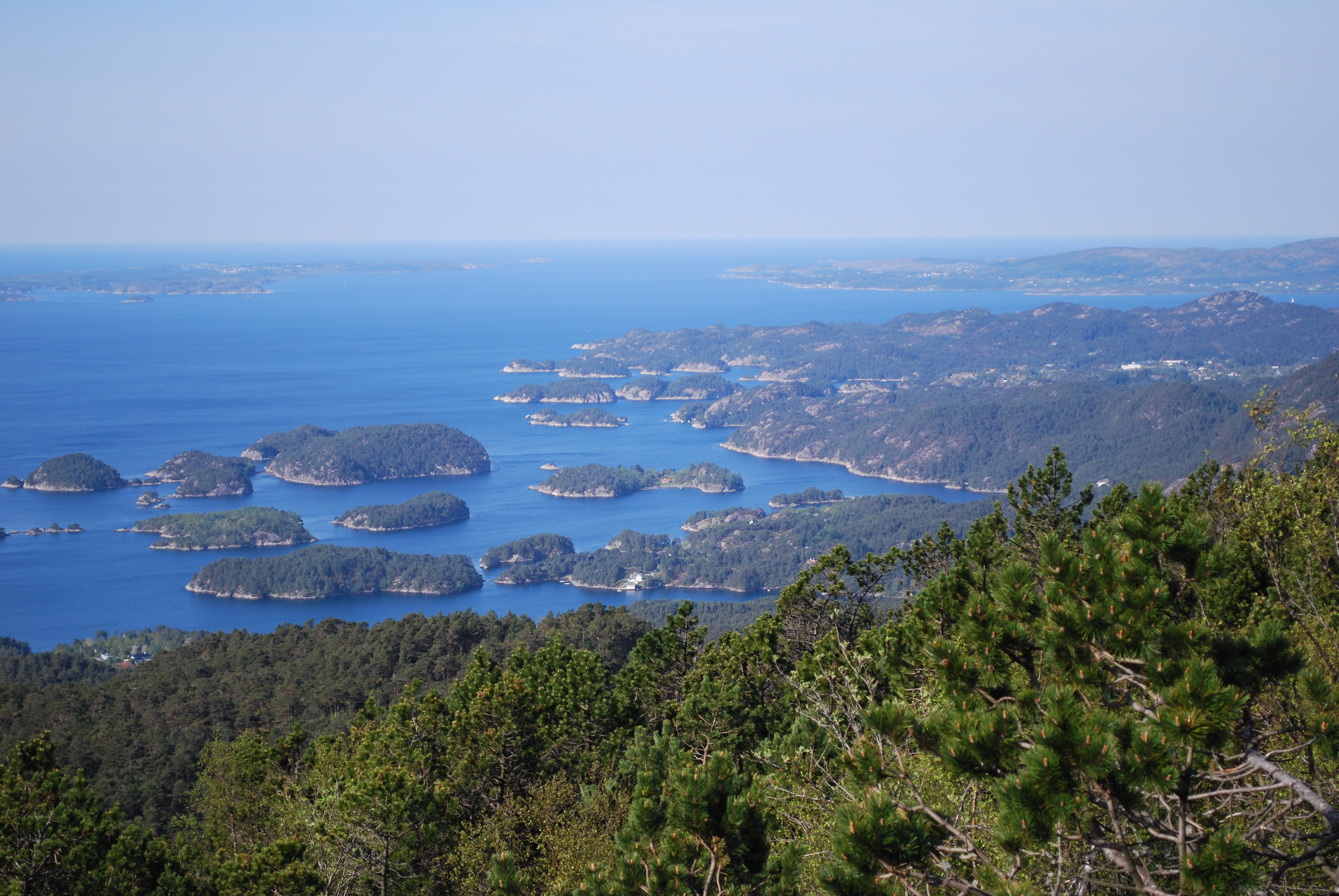
Western shoreline of Os

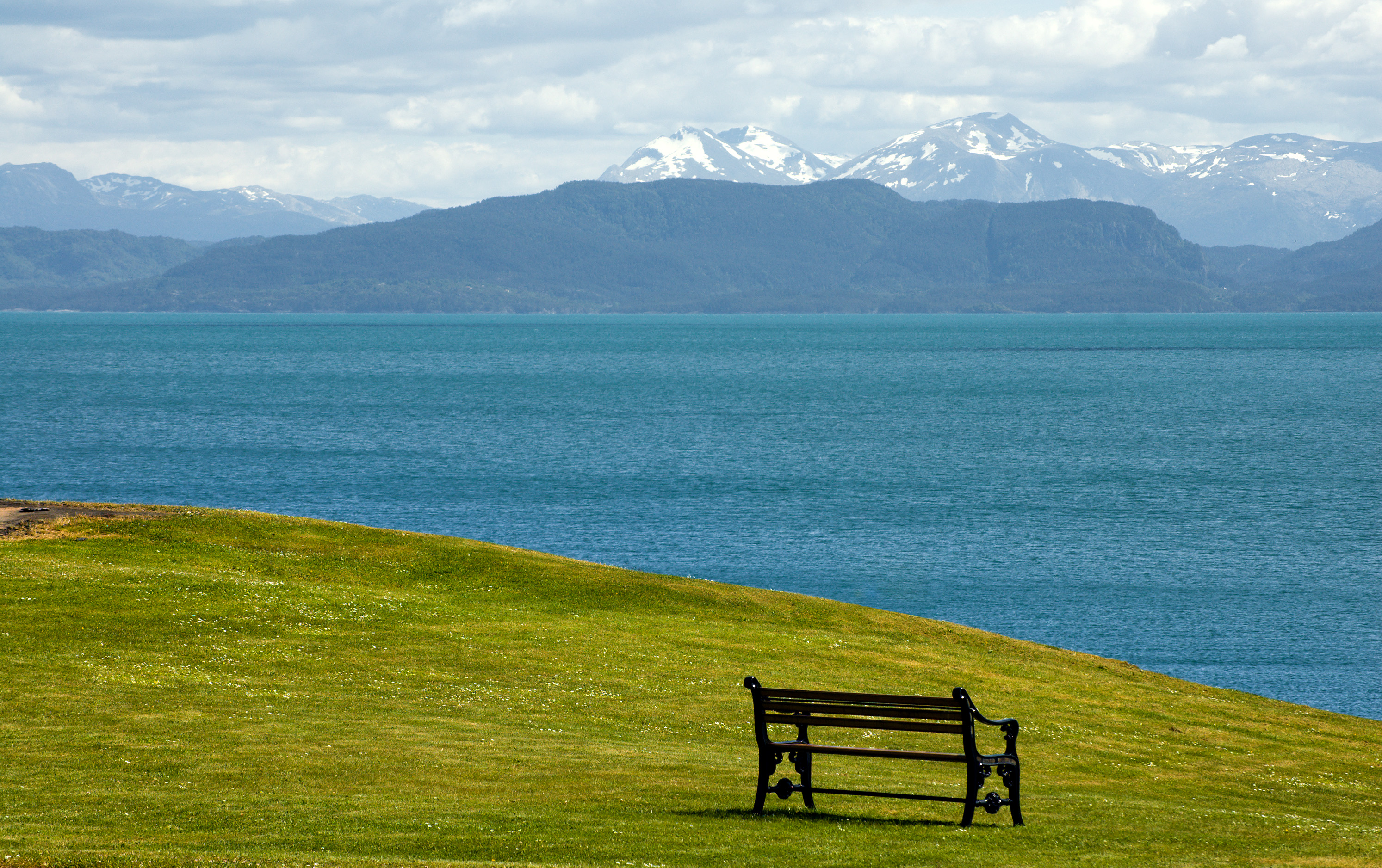
View from the Solstrand Hotel, looking southeast

The mayor (Nynorsk: ordførar) of Os Municipality was the political leader of the municipality and the chairperson of the municipal council. The following people have held this position:

- 1838–1841: Hans Astrup Krüger
- 1841–1843: Torstein Hoel Jersin
- 1844–1847: Ola Synnestvedt
- 1848–1851: Jon Kvaale
- 1852–1855: Hans Christian Krüger
- 1855–1857: Georg Døderlein Greve
- 1858–1861: Johan Leganger
- 1862–1863: Ole Hansen
- 1864–1867: Georg Døderlein Greve
- 1868–1871: Lars Nordvik
- 1872–1875: Baard Tvedt
- 1876–1879: Lars Nordvik
- 1880–1881: Baard Tvedt
- 1882–1883: Mathias Erichsen (MV)
- 1884–1885: Nils S. Røsseland (V)
- 1886–1910: Mathias Erichsen (H)
- 1911–1913: Hans Eide (V)
- 1914–1916: Hans M. Skinstad (H)
- 1917–1940: Nils Tveit (V)
- 1941–1942: Ole Moberg Hauge (Bp)
- 1942–1945: Sigurd Bugge (NS)
- 1945–1945: Nils Tveit (V)
- 1946–1949: Olav Moberg (Ap)
- 1950–1959: Anders Hauge (Bp)
- 1960–1967: Leif Strønen (V)
- 1968–1971: Alfred Monsen (Ap)
- 1972–1975: Erling H. Lunde (KrF)
- 1976–1987: Paul Martin Sælen (LL)
- 1988–1993: Ole Haakon Lunde (H)
- 1994–1995: Annlaug Tysseland (LL)
- 1995–1999: Geirmund Dyrdal (KrF)
- 1999–2016: Terje Søviknes (FrP)
- 2016–2018: Marie Lunde Bruarøy (H)
- 2018–2019: Terje Søviknes (FrP)

== Geography ==
Os Municipality was located on the southwestern part of the Bergen Peninsula, south of Bergen Municipality and southeast of Samnanger Municipality. The Fusafjorden was to the east, the Bjørnafjorden to the south, and the Lysefjorden to the west. Fusa Municipality was located to the east (across the Fusafjorden), Tysnes Municipality was to the south (across the Bjørnafjorden), and Austevoll Municipality was to the west (across the Lysefjorden).

The southwestern part of Os Municipality included many small islands including Skorpo, Strøno, Lysøya, and Innerøya. The village area of Søre Øyane was located on several small islands off the mainland shore.

The municipality was somewhat mountainous, especially in the northeastern part of the municipality. The highest point in the municipality was the 842.6-metre (2,764 ft) tall mountain Sveningen, a tripoint boundary in the extreme northeastern part of the municipality, marking the boundary point where the municipalities of Bergen, Os, and Samnanger meet. The mountains of Mosnuken and Lyshornet were also located in Os Municipality.

== Culture ==
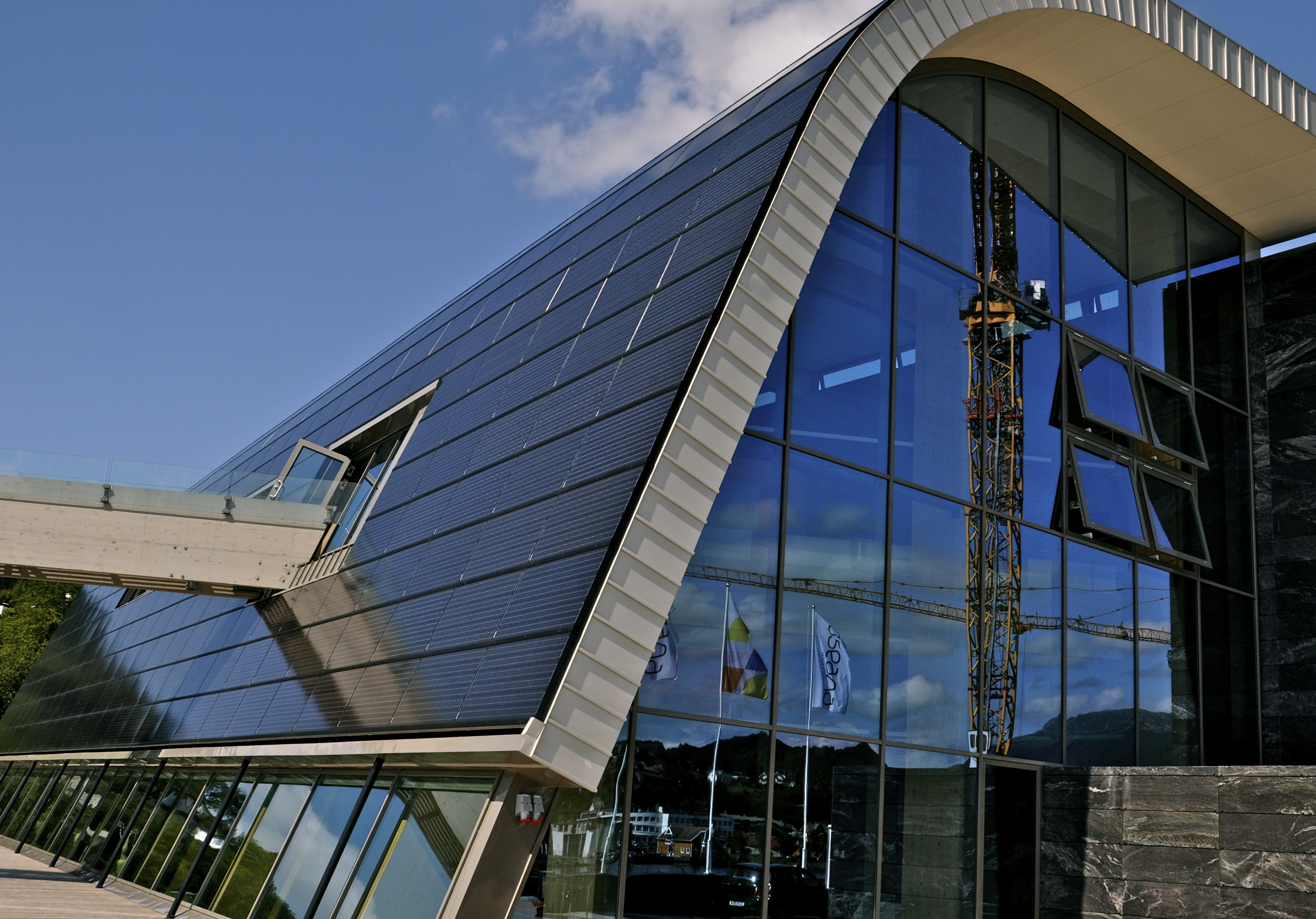
Oseana kunst- og kultursenter

The Oseana Art and Cultural Centre is located in Os Municipality. It hosted art and music events year-round. The building is fairly new and in 2011, it won the "Building of the Year Award" (Årets Bygg) for Norway.

== Industry ==
Os has had a tradition of small boat building since the early 1800s. The Oselvar is the traditional boat of Os Municipality. This small wooden boat was named after its major important building site during the 18th century, at the mouth of the Oselva River. These boats have traditionally been used for everyday work and for traveling to church. These boats were designed as either sailboats or rowboats. They still build these boats the traditional way in Os, and tourists are able to visit and watch them work.

The Oselvar is now the official boat of Norway. With its traditions, the boat has become a symbol of the nation. The boat is shown on the coat of arms of Os.

The village of Hagavik also had a modern boat building company, Askeladden Boats AS. Askeladden is Norway's largest manufacturer of leisure boats.

== Transportation ==
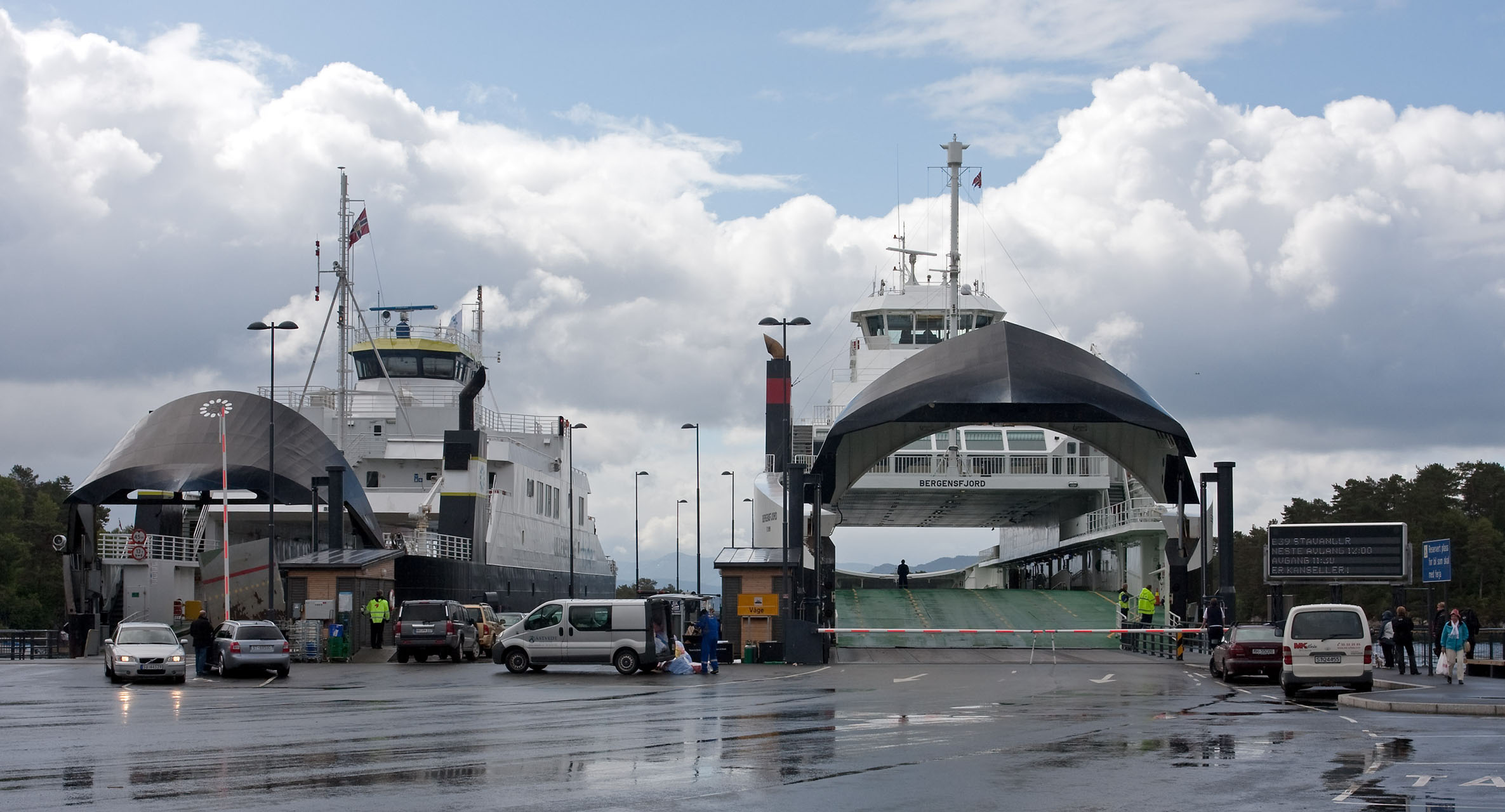
Halhjem 01

The European route E39 highway passed through Os from the city of Bergen (to the north) to the ferry quay at Haljem, on the shore of the Bjørnafjorden. The quay had two different regularly scheduled ferry routes that stopped here to cross the Bjørnafjorden. There was a ferry from Haljem to Våge on the island of Tysnesøya in Tysnes Municipality to the southeast. There is also a ferry (that is part of the E39 highway) from Haljem to Sandvika, just north of the village of Fitjar in Fitjar Municipality to the south.

== Demographics ==
Historical population

Year	Pop.	±% p.a.
1855	4,646	—
1865	3,750	−2.12%
1875	3,933	+0.48%
1891	4,536	+0.90%
1900	5,242	+1.62%
1910	3,267	−4.62%

Year	Pop.	±% p.a.
1920	3,713	+1.29%
1930	3,831	+0.31%
1946	4,993	+1.67%
1951	5,580	+2.25%
1960	6,637	+1.95%
1970	8,006	+1.89%

Year	Pop.	±% p.a.
1980	10,598	+2.84%
1990	12,608	+1.75%
2000	13,896	+0.98%
2010	16,684	+1.85%
2019	20,804	+2.48%

Note: The municipal borders were changed in 1856, 1907, and 1964, causing a significant change in the population.
Source: Statistics Norway and Norwegian Historical Data Centre

As of 1 January 2014, Os had a population of 18,678 which gave it a population density of 139.9 inhabitants per square kilometre (362/sq mi), compared to a county average of about 30 inhabitants per square kilometre (78/sq mi) and a national average of about 15 inhabitants per square kilometre (39/sq mi). About 80% of the population of Os lived in urban settlements. About 1.9% of the population were registered as unemployed; the county and national average is 2.6%. About 26% of the workforce were employed in public administration. About 2% were employed in the primary sector of economic activity, 28.2% in the secondary sector, and 69.3% in the tertiary sector. In the period from 29 October to 4 November 2001, 45.7% of the workforce of Os commuted out of the municipality, mainly to the neighboring city of Bergen. In the same time period, Os received a daily average of 753 commuters from other municipalities, 15.8% of those employed in Os. In 2006, Os had a daily out-commuting of 3,001 people.

== Notable people ==
- Ole Bull, the famous violinist, built his Villa Lysøen on the island of Lysøya in Os. That special building was inspired by his travels, especially his travels to the Middle East. The island of Lysøen was originally owned by Lyse Abbey, the ruins of which still stand and are frequently visited.
- Aurora Aksnes, a singer-songwriter who was born in Stavanger, grew up in Os.

== See also ==
- List of former municipalities of Norway
