= Lysefjorden (Vestland) =

Fjord in Vestland, Norway

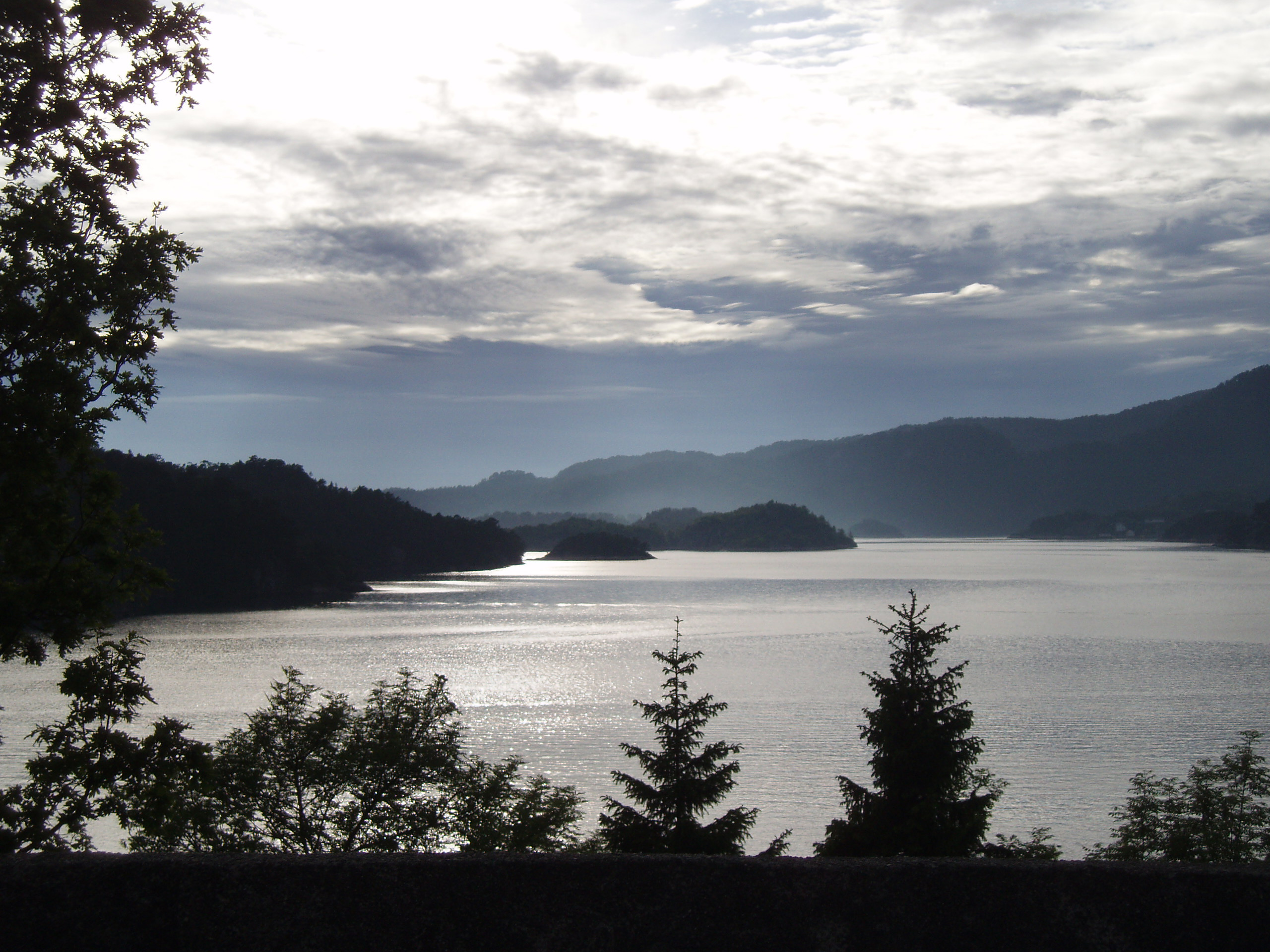
- View of the fjord
- Interactive map of Lysefjorden
- Location: Vestland county, Norway
- Coordinates: 60.2025°N 5.29438°E
- Type: Fjord
- Primary outflows: Krossfjorden
- Basin countries: Norway
- Max. length: 6 kilometres (3.7 mi)
- Max. width: 2–3 kilometres (1–2 mi)

Lysefjorden is a fjord in Vestland county, Norway. The 6-kilometre (3.7 mi) long fjord lies along the border of Bergen Municipality and Bjørnafjorden Municipality. The island of Lysøya which is the site of the Ole Bull Museum Lysøen is located in the fjord. The villages of Nordvik (in Bergen Municipality) and Søvik (in Bjørnafjorden Municipality) are both located at the inner part of the fjord. The Lysefjorden flows west and joins the Bjørnafjorden and Krossfjorden. The fjord is named after the old Lyse Abbey which is located about 1.5 kilometres (0.93 mi) east of the fjord's shoreline.

== See also ==
- List of Norwegian fjords
