= Sebastian Plätzer =

Norwegian footballer (born 2005)

Personal information
- Full name: Sebastian Tysse Plätzer
- Date of birth: 5 June 2005 (age 21)
- Place of birth: Søfteland, Norway
- Position: Midfielder

Team information
- Current team: Brann 2 (on loan from Os)
- Number: 23

Youth career
- Søfteland
- 2017–2021: Os

Senior career*
Years	Team	Apps	(Gls)
2021–2024	Os 2	13	(1)
2021–	Os	72	(10)
2025–	→ Brann 2 (loan)	10	(1)
- * Club domestic league appearances and goals as of 14 October 2025

Sebastian Tysse Plätzer (born 5 June 2005) is a Norwegian footballer who plays as a midfielder for Brann 2, on loan from Os.

== Club career ==
Born in Søfteland, Plätzer began his career with local side Søfteland TIL, before playing for the joint-academy team of Søfteland and Os. Having progressed through the academy, he made his first-team debut in the 2021 edition of the Norwegian Cup, in a 6–2 home loss to Øygarden. Following two further appearances in the Norwegian Third Division, he signed his maiden first-team contract ahead of the 2022 season - a one-year deal.

The following year, he established himself as a first-team player, with head coach Endre Brenne stating that he "is a very exciting young player who over time has earned his place in the A team". He scored his first goal for the club in a 2–1 home win against Ready in the Norwegian Third Division on 14 May 2022; scoring the winning goal minutes after coming off the bench.

In June 2023, Plätzer was invited by German side Bayern Munich to be part of their World Squad initiative, representing the club in international friendlies.

== Career statistics ==
=== Club ===
As of 14 October 2025.

Appearances and goals by club, season and competition
Club	Season	League			Cup		Other		Total	
Club	Season	Division	Apps	Goals	Apps	Goals	Apps	Goals	Apps	Goals
Os 2	2021	4. divisjon	2	0	–		0	0	2	0
Os 2	2022	4. divisjon	9	0	–		0	0	9	0
Os 2	2023	5. divisjon	1	1	–		0	0	1	1
Os 2	2024	4. divisjon	1	0	–		0	0	1	0
Os 2	Total		13	1	0	0	0	0	13	1
Os	2021	3. divisjon	2	0	1 (Note: Appearances in the Norwegian Cup)	0	0	0	3	0
Os	2022	3. divisjon	22	4	4	0	0	0	26	4
Os	2023	3. divisjon	18	1	1	0	0	0	19	1
Os	2024	3. divisjon	16	1	0	0	0	0	16	1
Os	2025	3. divisjon	14	4	5	1	0	0	19	5
Os	Total		72	10	11	1	0	0	83	11
Brann 2 (loan)	2025	2. divisjon	10	1	0	0	0	0	10	1
Career total			95	12	11	1	0	0	106	13
