= Nore Neset Church =

Church in Vestland, Norway

- Nore Neset kyrkje
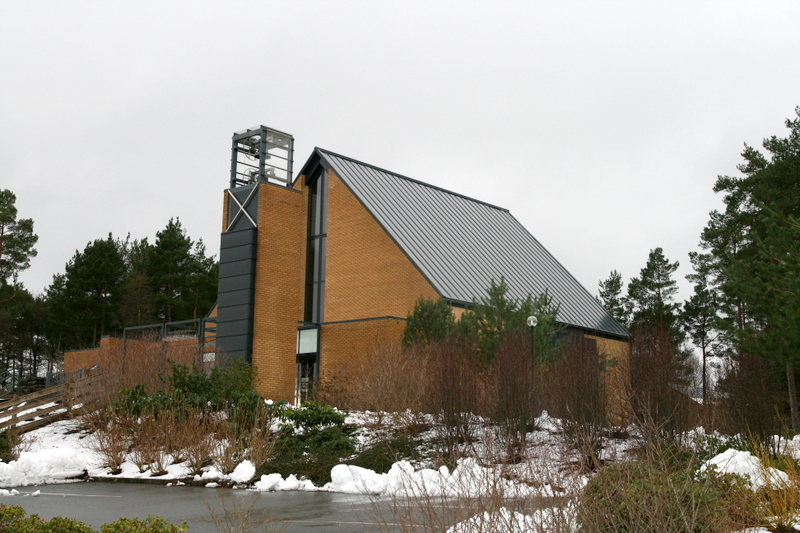
- View of the church
- Nore Neset Church
- 60°10′45″N 5°24′08″E
- Location: Bjørnafjorden, Vestland
- Country: Norway
- Denomination: Church of Norway
- Churchmanship: Evangelical Lutheran

History
- Status: Parish church
- Founded: 2000
- Consecrated: 1 Dec 2000

Architecture
- Functional status: Active
- Architect(s): Mette and Morten Molden
- Architectural type: Fan-shaped
- Completed: 2000 (26 years ago)

Specifications
- Capacity: 200
- Materials: Brick

Administration
- Diocese: Bjørgvin bispedømme
- Deanery: Fana prosti
- Parish: Os

Nore Neset Church (Norwegian: Nore Neset kyrkje) is a parish church of the Church of Norway in Bjørnafjorden Municipality in Vestland county, Norway. It is located in the village of Hagavik, just west of the municipal centre of Osøyro. It is one of the two churches for the Os parish which is part of the Fana prosti (deanery) in the Diocese of Bjørgvin. The brown, brick church was built in a fan-shaped design in 2000 using plans drawn up by the architects Mette and Morten Molden. The church seats about 200 people.

== History ==
During the 1990s, plans were made for a new church in Hagavik. The architects Mette and Morten Molden designed the new building. The brick church building itself is almost square and has lower extensions to the east and south as well as a free-standing, asymmetrically placed bell tower. The church was consecrated on 1 December 2000.

== See also ==
- List of churches in Bjørgvin
