= Møsnuken =

Mountain in Vestland, Norway

Highest point
- Elevation: 639 m (2,096 ft)
- Prominence: 449 m (1,473 ft)
- Isolation: 7.2 km (4.5 mi)
- Coordinates: 60°13′59″N 5°31′12″E

Geography
- Location: Vestland, Norway

Climbing
- Easiest route: Hiking

Møsnuken is a mountain in Bjørnafjorden Municipality in Vestland county, Norway. The 639-metre (2,096 ft) mountain lies about 3.5 kilometres (2.2 mi) east of the village of Syfteland, about 2 kilometres (1.2 mi) northwest of the Fusafjorden, and about 6 kilometres (3.7 mi) from Osøyro.

== See also ==
- List of mountains of Norway
