= Nordvik, Vestland =

Village in Bergen Municipality, Norway

Nordvik
- Village
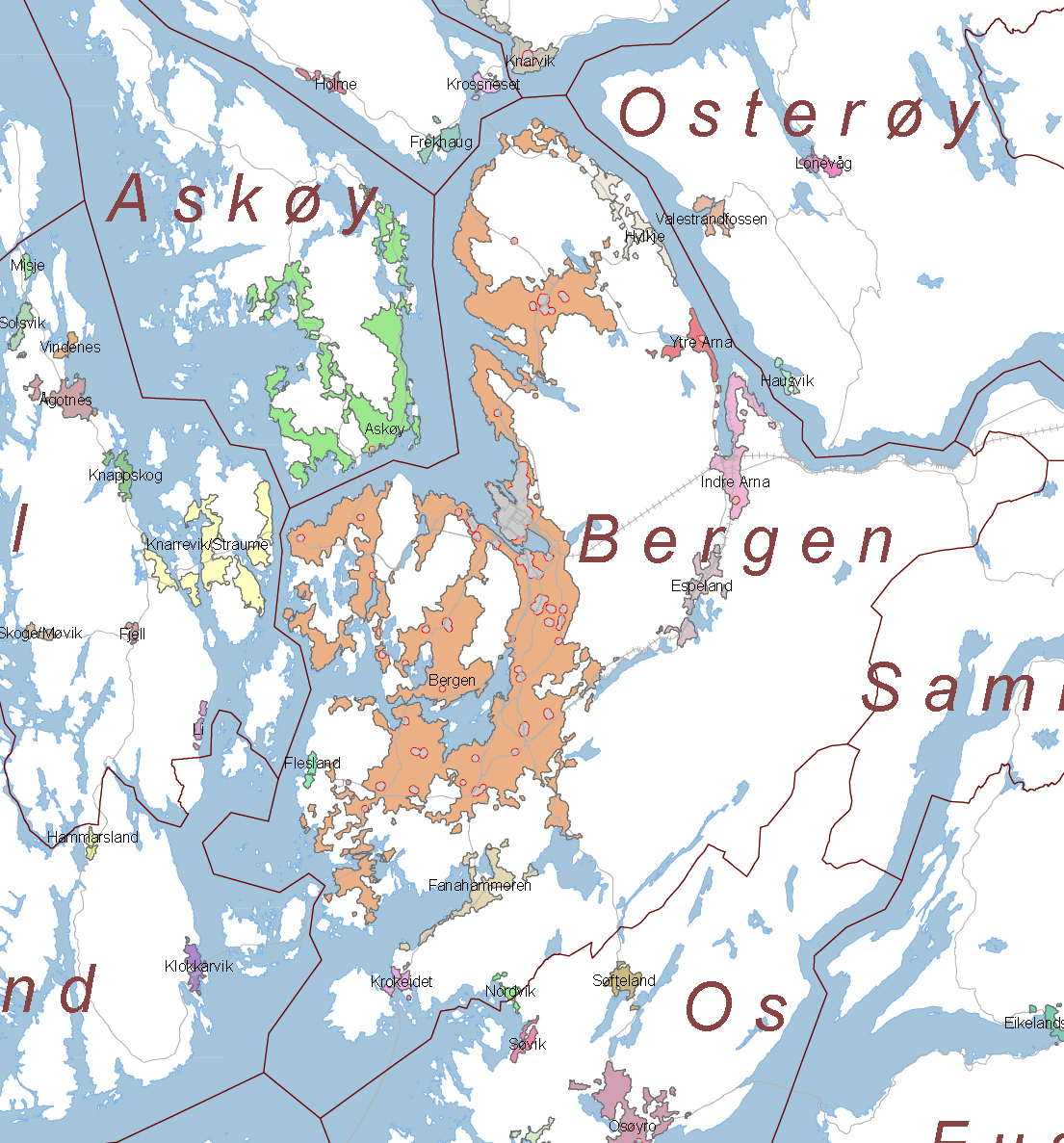
- Location of the village
- Interactive map of Nordvik
- Coordinates: 60.2342°N 5.3578°E
- Country: Norway
- Region: Western Norway
- County: Vestland
- District: Midthordland
- Municipalities: Bergen
- Elevation: 46 m (151 ft)
- Time zone: UTC+01:00 (CET)
  - Summer (DST): UTC+02:00 (CEST)
- Post Code: 5243 Fana

Nordvik is a village area in Bergen Municipality in Vestland county, Norway. The village lies in the borough of Fana, just north of the municipal border with Bjørnafjorden Municipality.

In 2008, the population of the 0.42-square-kilometre (100-acre) Nordvik urban area was 429. At that time the urban area had a population density of 1,021 inhabitants per square kilometre (2,640/sq mi). The village of Søvik lies just south of the municipal border in Bjørnafjorden Municipality. Over time, the two have grown together through conurbation. Since 2012, the village of Nordvik has been considered part of the "urban area" of Søvik in Bjørnafjorden, so separate statistics for the village of Nordvik are no longer tracked by Statistics Norway.
