= Osøyro =

Village in Bjørnafjorden Municipality, Norway

- Village
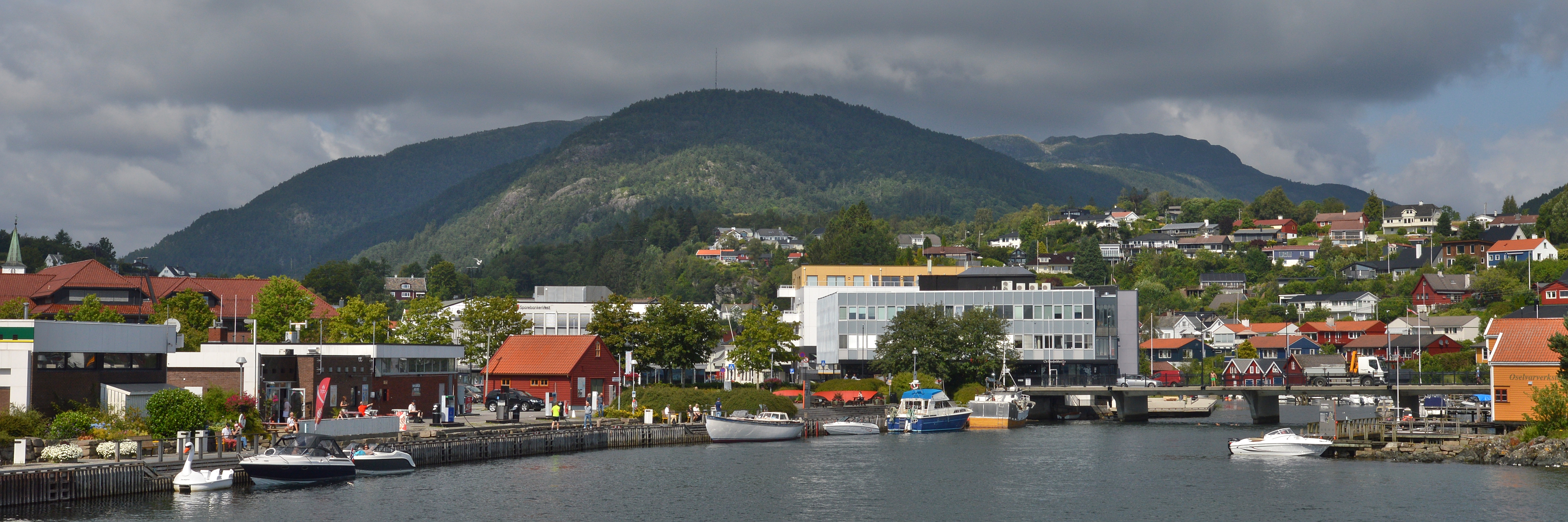
- View of the village area in 2021
- Interactive map of Osøyro
- Coordinates: 60.18463°N 5.46907°E
- Country: Norway
- Region: Western Norway
- County: Vestland
- District: Midhordland
- Municipality: Bjørnafjorden Municipality

Area
  - Total: 9.41 km^{2} (3.63 sq mi)
- Elevation: 2 m (6.6 ft)

Population (2025)
  - Total: 15,120
  - Density: 1,607/km^{2} (4,160/sq mi)
- Time zone: UTC+01:00 (CET)
  - Summer (DST): UTC+02:00 (CEST)
- Post Code: 5208 Os

Osøyro is the administrative centre of Bjørnafjorden Municipality in Vestland county, Norway. The village lies on the southwestern part of the Bergen Peninsula, along the western shore of the Fusafjorden, about 25 kilometres (16 mi) south of the city centre of Bergen. The European route E39 highway runs through the village on its way to Bergen. There is a car ferry from the east side of Osøyro to the village of Fusa, across the Fusafjorden. Os Church is located in the village.

Osøyro has several smaller suburban villages surrounding it: Syfteland to the north, Søvik to the northwest, Hagavik to the west, Søre Øyane to the southwest, and Haljem to the south.

The 9.41-square-kilometre (2,330-acre) village has a population (2025) of 15,120 and a population density of 1,607 inhabitants per square kilometre (4,160/sq mi).
