= Lyshornet =

Mountain in Vestland, Norway

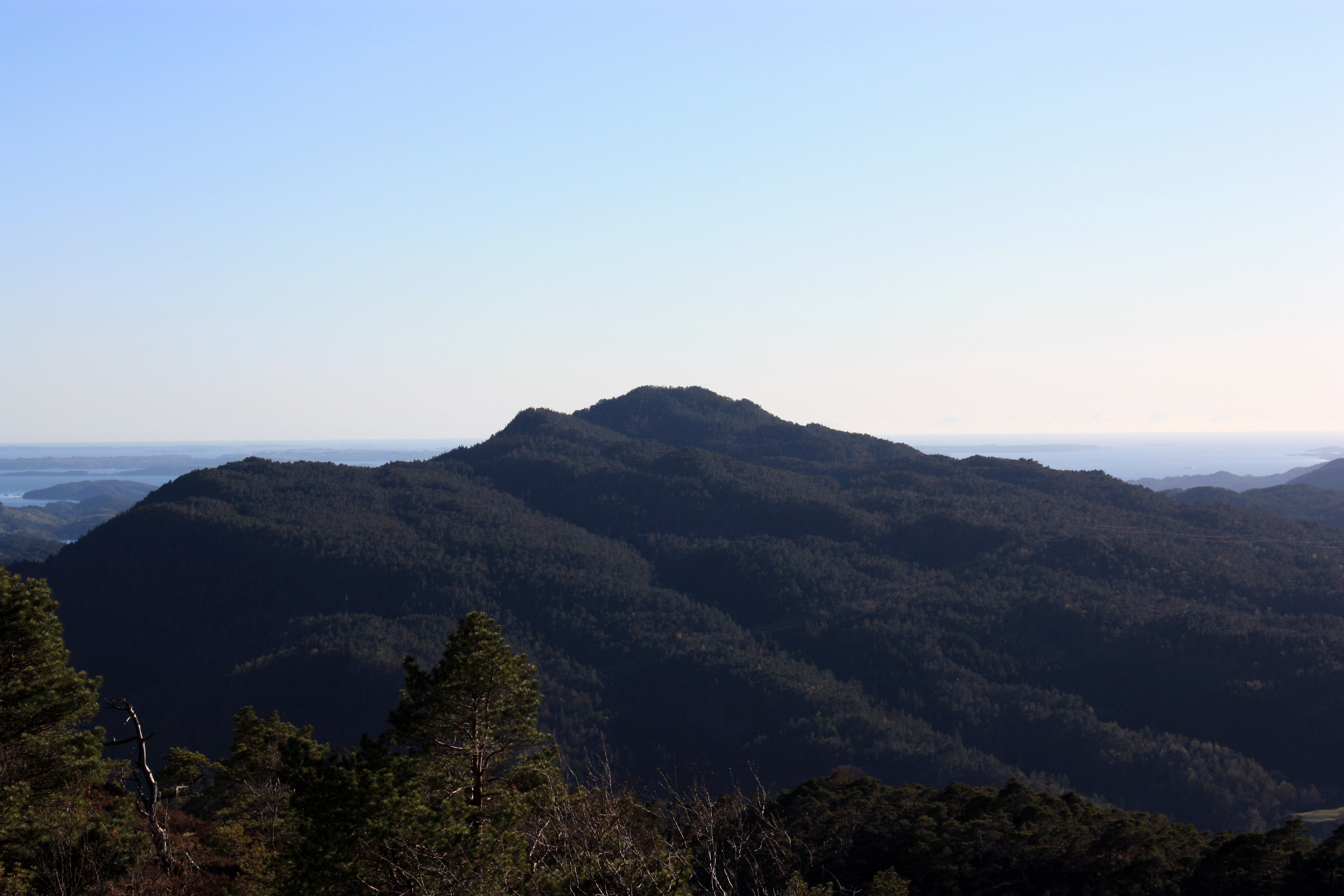

Highest point
- Elevation: 405 m (1,329 ft)
- Prominence: 329 m (1,079 ft)
- Isolation: 4.3 km (2.7 mi)
- Coordinates: 60°14′27″N 5°24′24″E

Geography
- Location: Vestland, Norway

Climbing
- Easiest route: Hiking

Lyshornet is a mountain in Bjørnafjorden Municipality in Vestland county, Norway. The 405-metre (1,329 ft) tall mountain lies about 3 kilometres (1.9 mi) north of the village of Søvik and about 2 kilometres (1.2 mi) west of the village of Syfteland. The Lyse Abbey lies at the southern base of the mountain.

== See also ==
- List of mountains of Norway
