= Lysøya =

Island in Vestland, Norway

Lysøya Lysøen (historic)
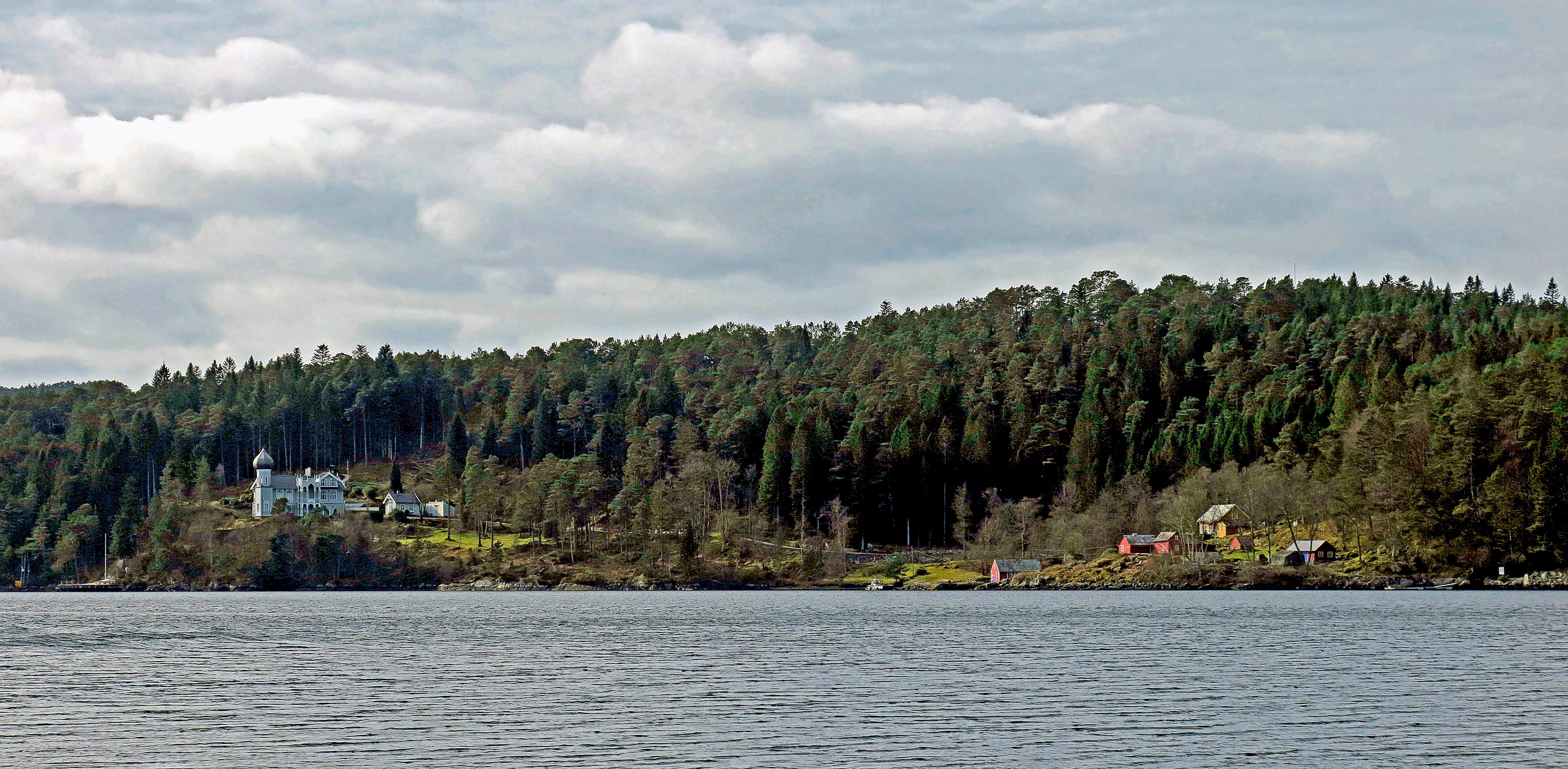
- View of the island
- Interactive map of the island

Geography
- Location: Vestland, Norway
- Coordinates: 60.21473°N 5.36104°E
- Area: 0.72 km^{2} (0.28 sq mi)
- Length: 1.5 km (0.93 mi)
- Width: 1 km (0.6 mi)
- Coastline: 5 km (3.1 mi)
- Highest elevation: 76 m (249 ft)

Administration
- Norway
- County: Vestland
- Municipality: Bjørnafjorden Municipality

Demographics
- Population: 0

Lysøya is an uninhabited island in Bjørnafjorden Municipality in Vestland county, Norway. The 0.72-square-kilometre (180-acre) island lies in the Lysefjorden, a small branch off the main Bjørnafjorden. The island name was historically spelled Lysøen.

The island is well known as the site of Villa Lysøen, the home of Norwegian violin-virtuoso and composer Ole Bull until his death in 1880. The whole island was owned by Ole Bull and has been passed down through his family until 1974 when it was given to the Society for the Preservation of Ancient Norwegian Monuments. Since 1984, the island and villa have been the Ole Bull Museum Lysøen which is open to the public.

In 1903 by Ole Bull's American descendants built a lookout tower on the highest point on the island which sits at an elevation of 76 metres (249 ft) above sea level.

The island is only accessible by boat. Tourists can access the island and museum by a ferry from the village of Søvik in Bjørnafjorden Municipality, located less than 1 kilometre (0.62 mi) to the east.

== History ==
The island of Lysøya (historically spelled Lysøen) was originally the site of a single farm established around 1670. The island (and farm) was bought by Ole Bull in 1872 who constructed a villa there. It was owned by Bull and his descendents until 1974 when it was donated to the Society for the Preservation of Ancient Norwegian Monuments.

== See also ==
- Ole Bull Museum Lysøen
