= Os Church (Vestland) =

Church in Vestland, Norway

- Os kyrkje
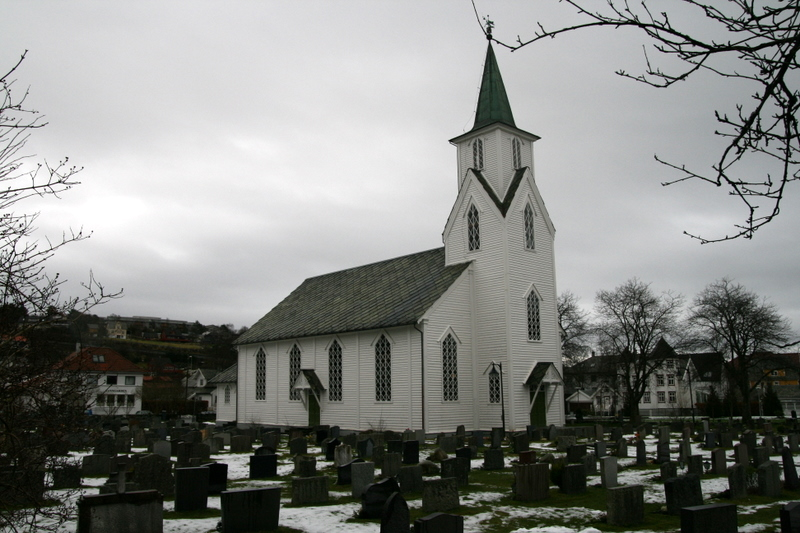
- View of the church
- Os Church
- 60°11′13″N 5°28′11″E
- Location: Bjørnafjorden, Vestland
- Country: Norway
- Denomination: Church of Norway
- Previous denomination: Catholic Church
- Churchmanship: Evangelical Lutheran

History
- Status: Parish church
- Founded: 13th century
- Consecrated: 23 August 1870

Architecture
- Functional status: Active
- Architect: Ole Vangberg
- Architectural type: Long church
- Completed: 1870 (156 years ago)

Specifications
- Capacity: 600
- Materials: Wood

Administration
- Diocese: Bjørgvin bispedømme
- Deanery: Fana prosti
- Parish: Os
- Norwegian Cultural Heritage Site
- Type: Church
- Status: Listed
- ID: 85246

Os Church (Norwegian: Os kyrkje) is a parish church of the Church of Norway in Bjørnafjorden Municipality in Vestland county, Norway. It is located in the village of Osøyro. It is one of the two churches for the Os parish which is part of the Fana prosti (deanery) in the Diocese of Bjørgvin. The white, wooden church was built in a long church design in 1870 using plans drawn up by the architect Ole Vangberg. The church seats about 600 people.

== History ==
The earliest existing historical records of the church date back to the year 1306, but the church was already built in that year. The first church on this site was a wooden stave church that was likely built during the 13th century. In 1624, the old church was torn down and replaced with a timber-framed long church.

In 1814, this church served as an election church (Norwegian: valgkirke). Together with more than 300 other parish churches across Norway, it was a polling station for elections to the 1814 Norwegian Constituent Assembly which wrote the Constitution of Norway. This was Norway's first national elections. Each church parish was a constituency that elected people called "electors" who later met together in each county to elect the representatives for the assembly that was to meet at Eidsvoll Manor later that year.

During the 1860s, planning for a new church began. Christian Christie was hired to design the new church in 1866, but the building committee demanded changes that Christie would not accept, so he resigned. The assignment then went to Ole Vangberg, but his drawings were also heavily criticized by Jacob Wilhelm Nordan and Nicolay Nicolaysen, who worked for the Ministry of Church Affairs, and only after a number of changes were made, they finally approved the plans. In 1869–1870, a new church was built just to the southwest of the old church. The new church was consecrated on 23 August 1870. After the new church was completed, the old church was torn down. There are several artifacts in the present church that are from some of the previous churches including the baptismal font, candlesticks, church bell, and pulpit.

== Media gallery ==
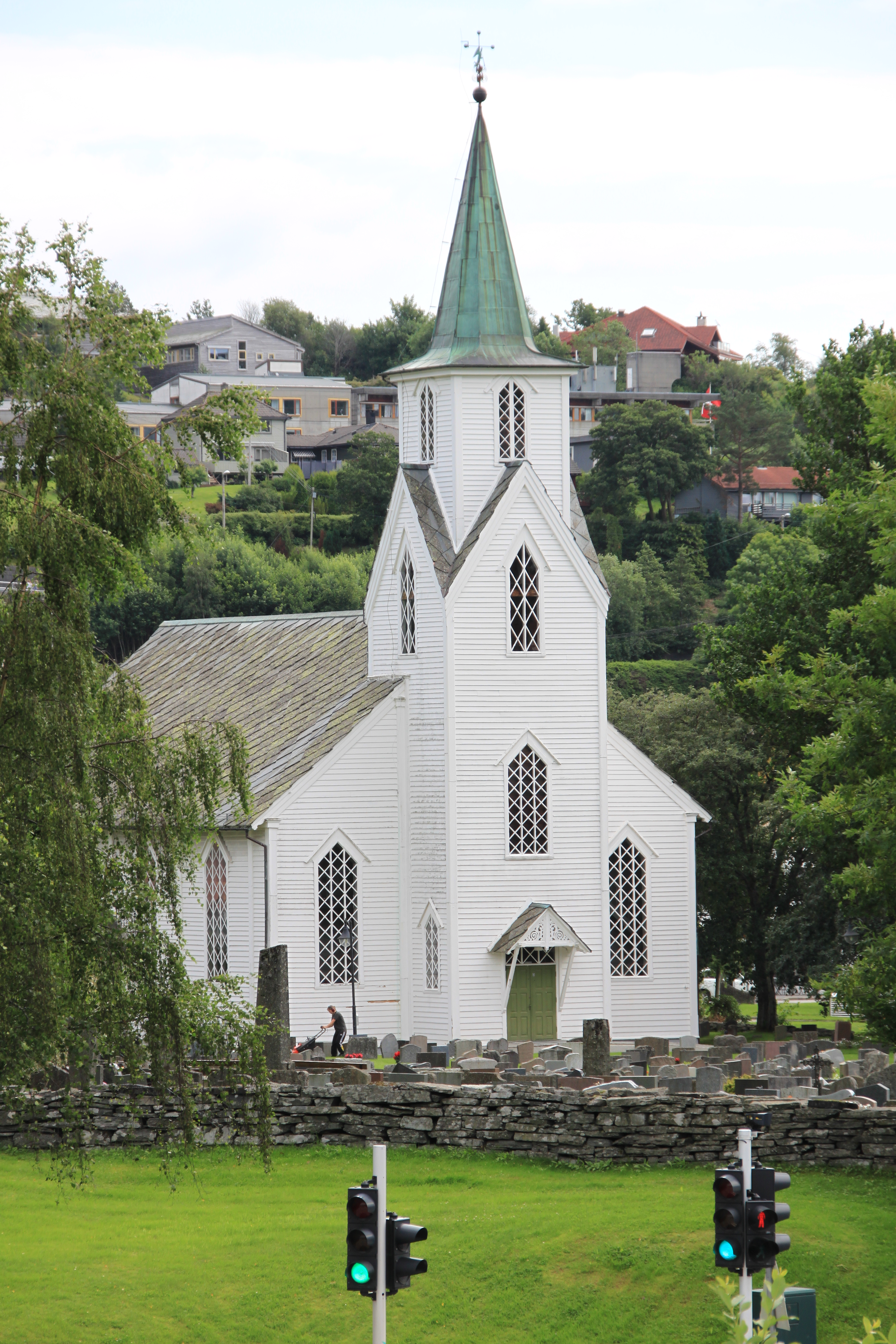

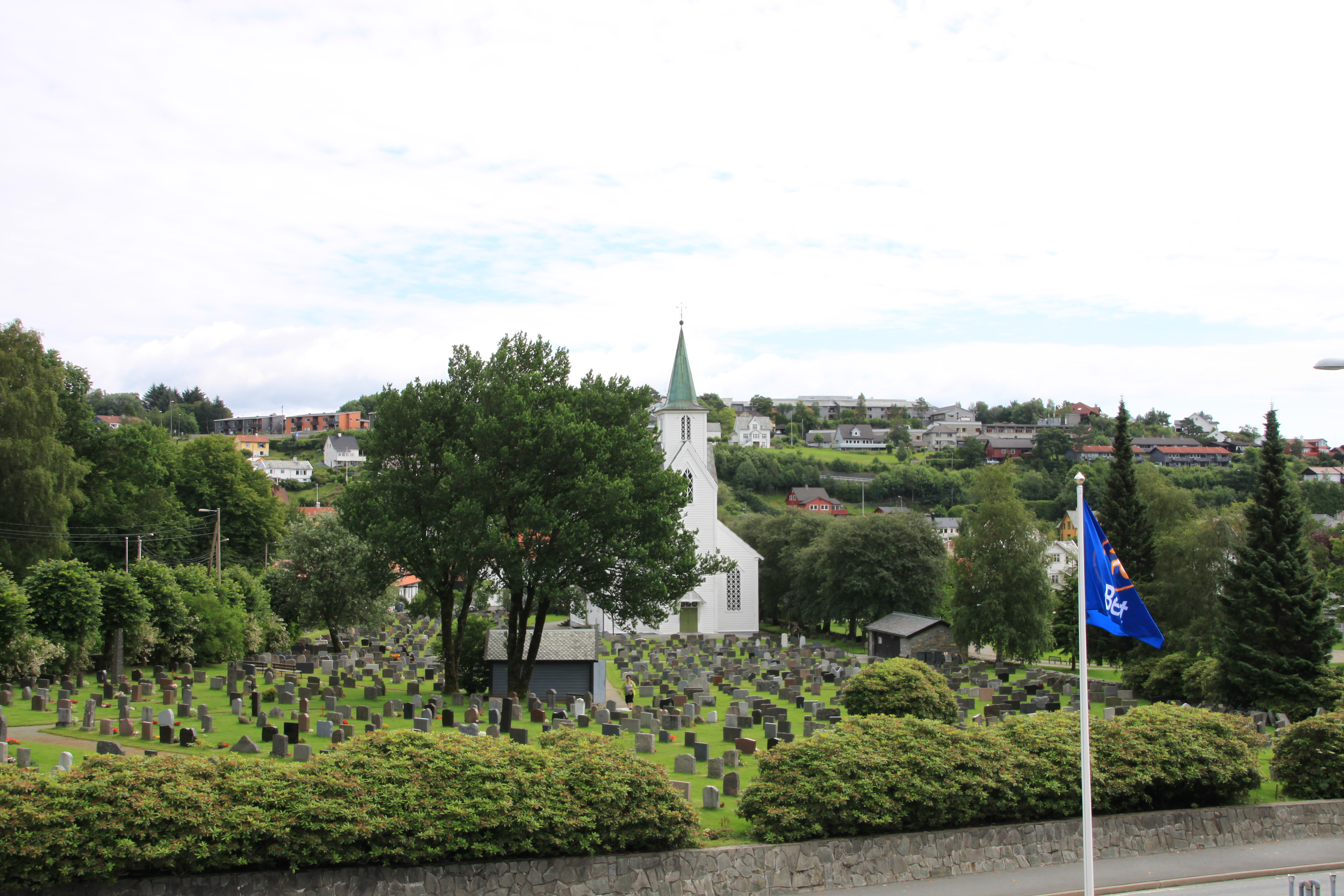

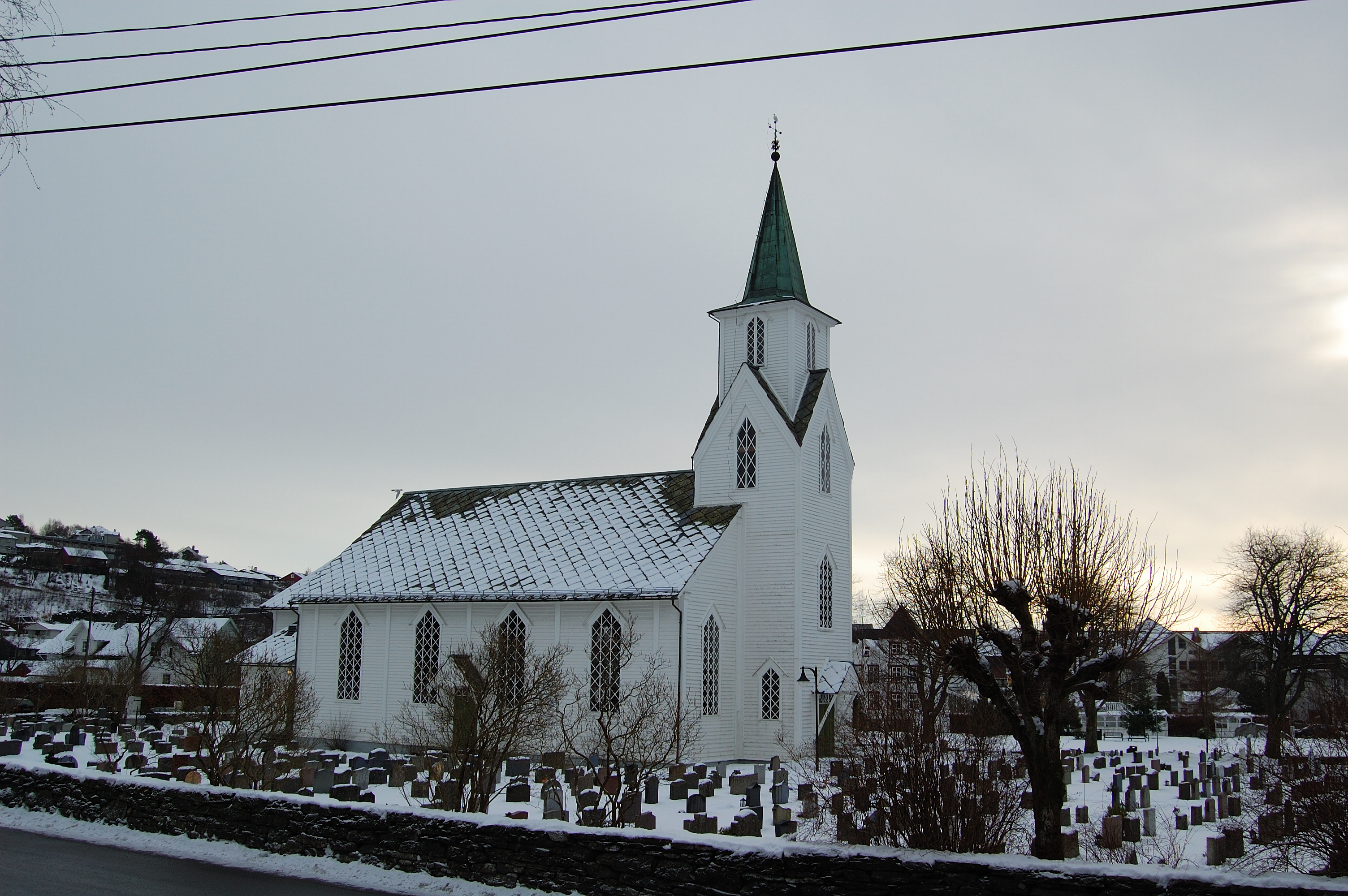

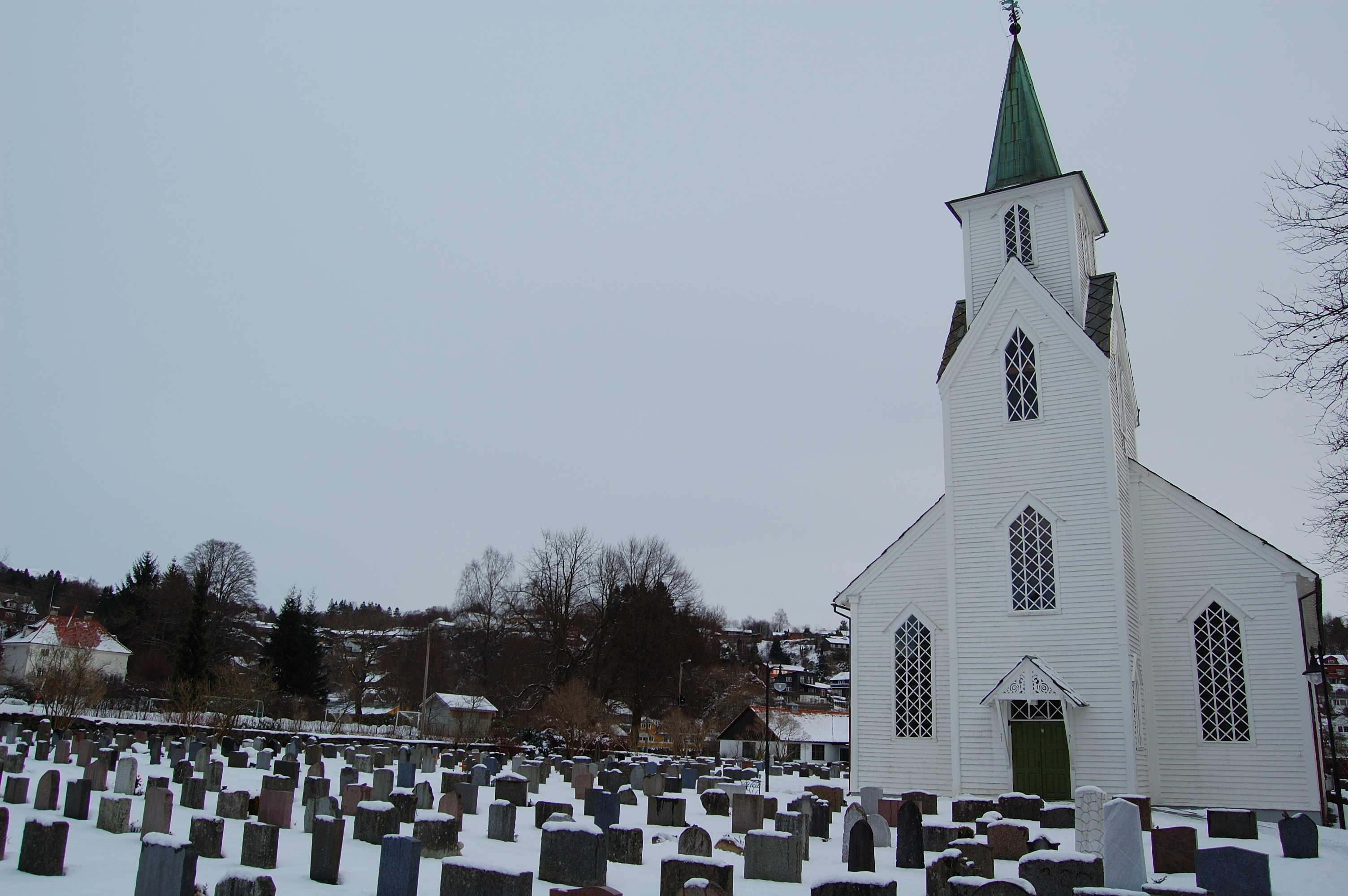

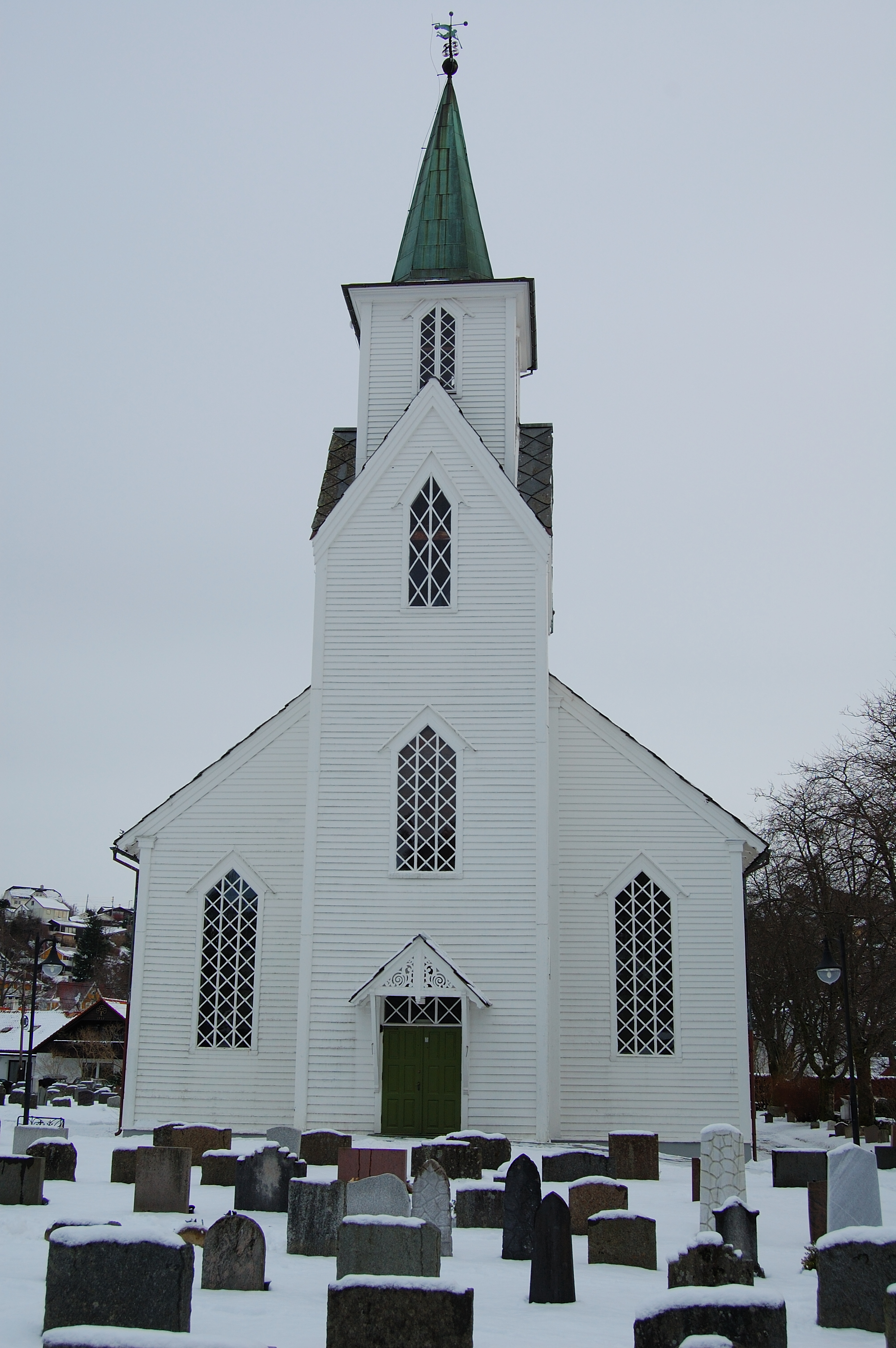

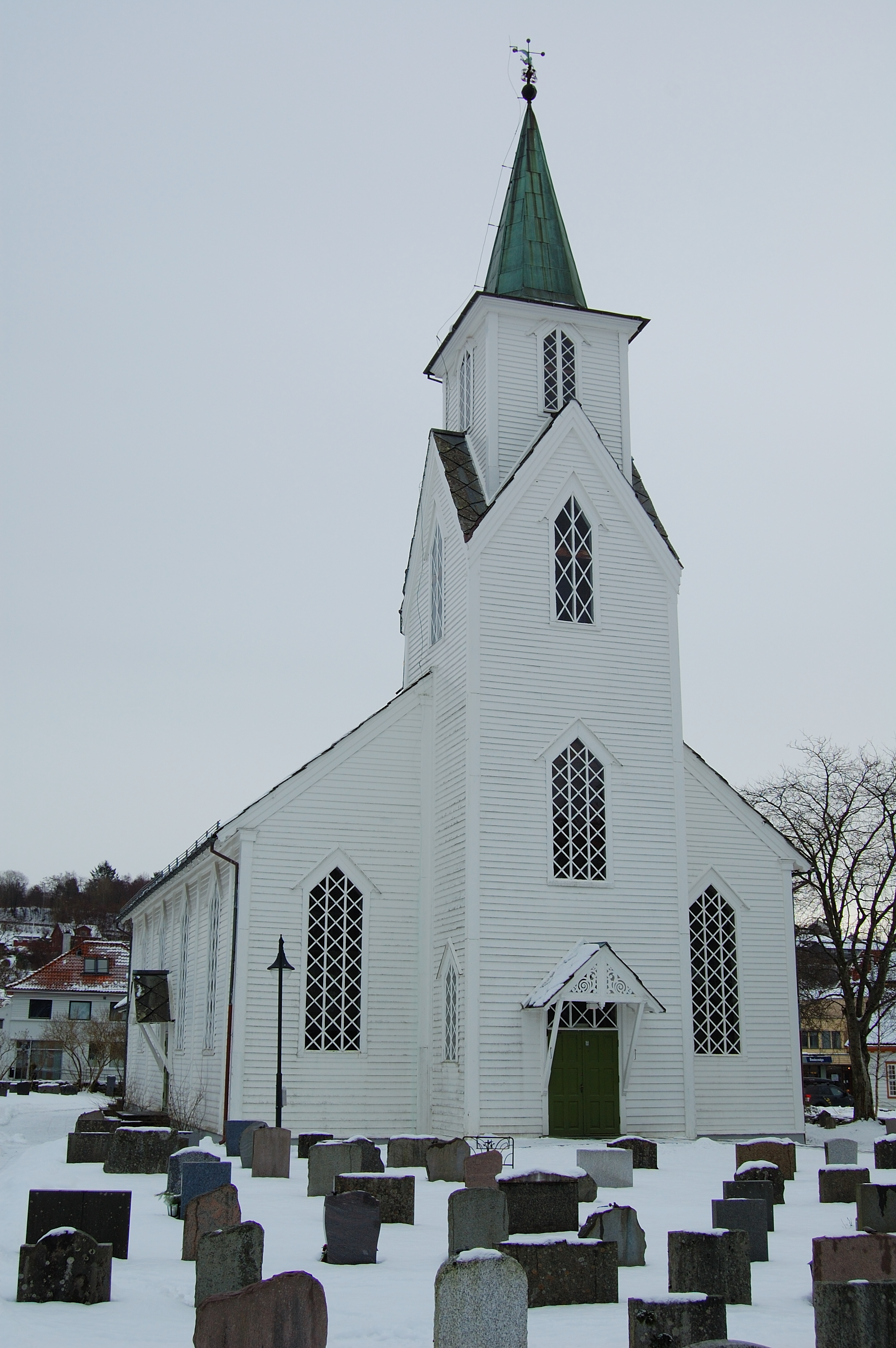

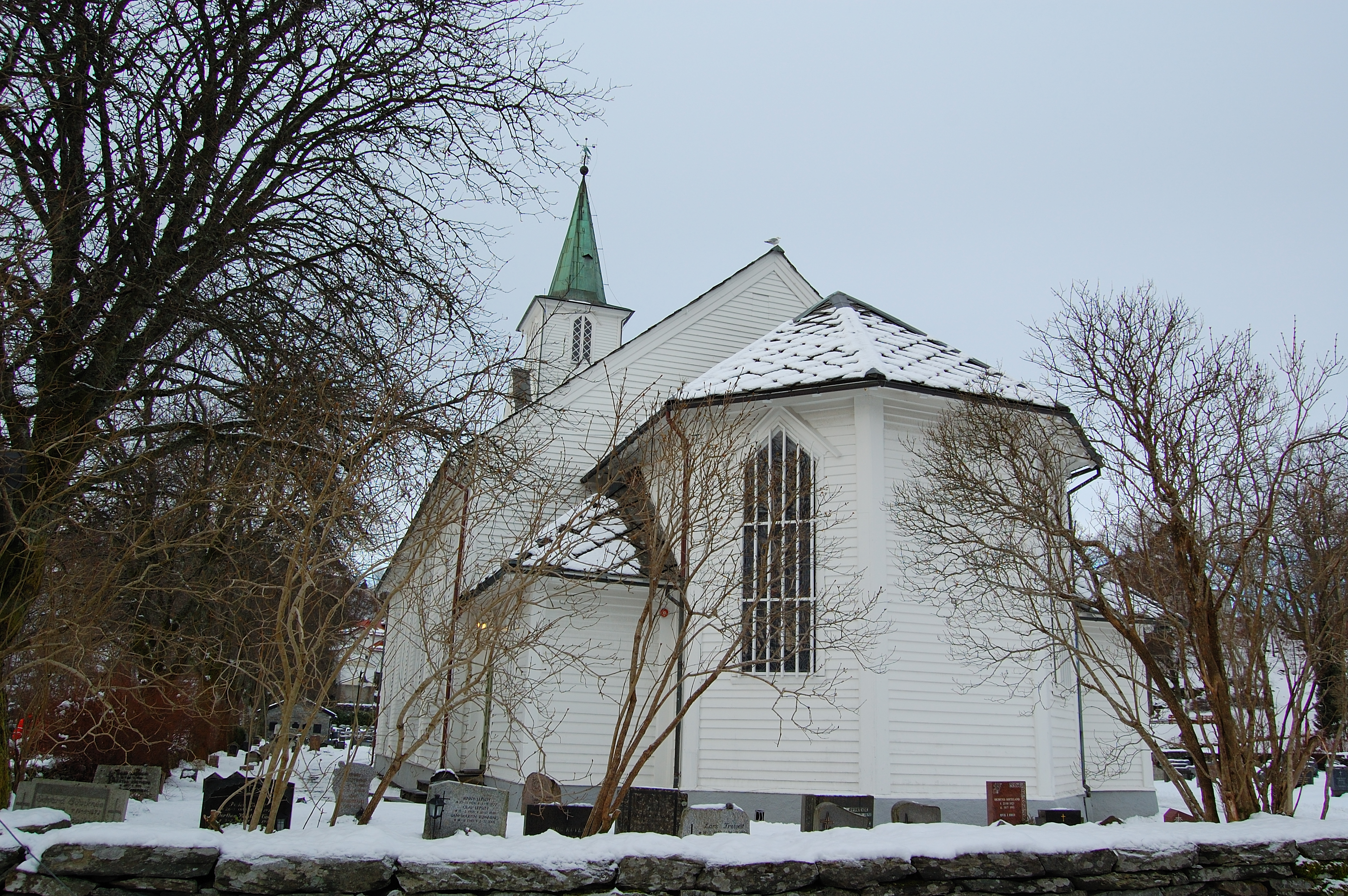

== See also ==
- List of churches in Bjørgvin
