= Hagavik =

- Village
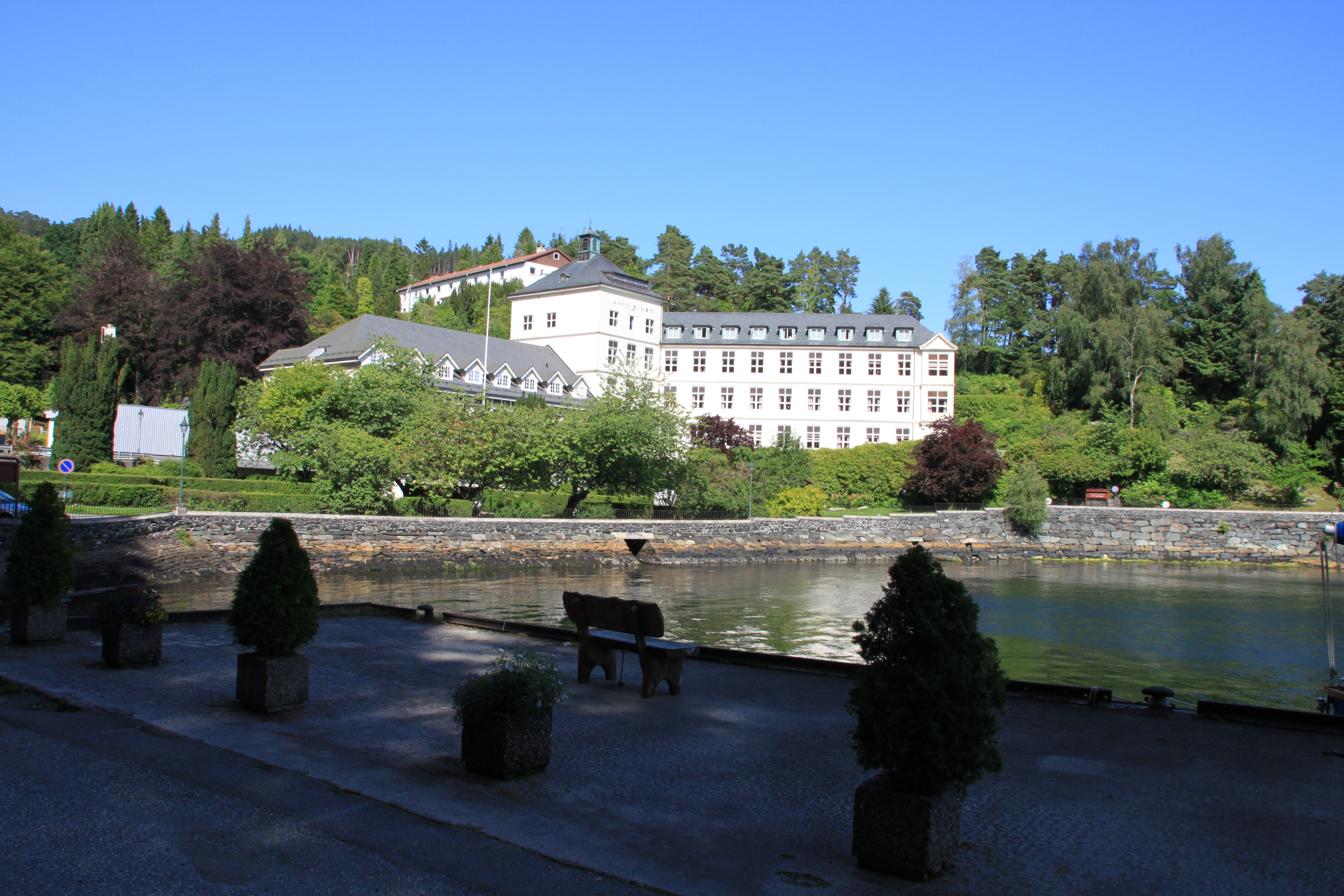
- View of the hospital in the village
- Interactive map of Hagavik
- Coordinates: 60.18076°N 5.40146°E
- Country: Norway
- Region: Western Norway
- County: Vestland
- District: Midhordland
- Municipality: Bjørnafjorden Municipality

Area
  - Total: 1.9 km^{2} (0.73 sq mi)
- Elevation: 50 m (160 ft)

Population (2012)
  - Total: 1,977
  - Density: 1,041/km^{2} (2,700/sq mi)
- Time zone: UTC+01:00 (CET)
  - Summer (DST): UTC+02:00 (CEST)
- Post Code: 5217 Hagavik

Hagavik is a village in Bjørnafjorden Municipality in Vestland county, Norway. The village lies immediately to the west of the municipal centre of Osøyro on the shore of the Skeisosen, an arm off the main Bjørnafjorden. Nore Neset Church is located in the village, as well as the Kysthospitalet, an orthopedic hospital that is part of the Helse Bergen network.

The 1.9-square-kilometre (470-acre) village had a population (2012) of 1,977 and a population density of 1,041 inhabitants per square kilometre (2,700/sq mi). Since 2000, the population and area data for this village area has not been separately tracked by Statistics Norway.
