= Haljem =

Village in Bjørnafjorden Municipality, Norway

Haljem Halhjem
- Village
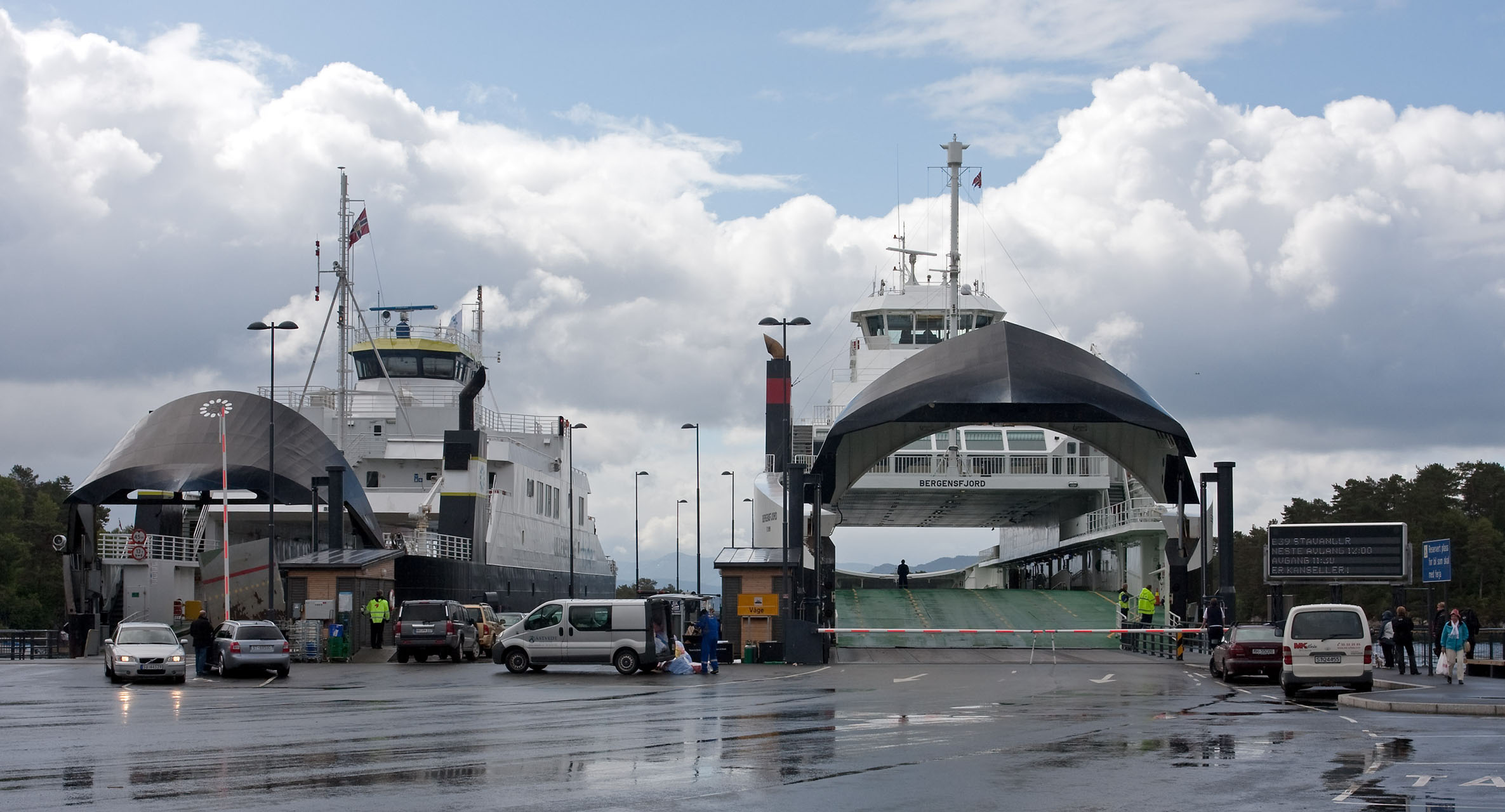
- View of the ferry quay in 2008
- Interactive map of Haljem
- Coordinates: 60.14909°N 5.4298°E
- Country: Norway
- Region: Western Norway
- County: Vestland
- District: Midhordland
- Municipality: Bjørnafjorden Municipality
- Elevation: 10 m (33 ft)
- Time zone: UTC+01:00 (CET)
  - Summer (DST): UTC+02:00 (CEST)
- Post Code: 5200 Os

Haljem is a village in Bjørnafjorden Municipality in Vestland county, Norway. The village is a suburb of the municipal centre of Osøyro, located immediately to the north. The village is the site of an important ferry quay along the European route E39 highway which runs between the major cities of Bergen (to the north) and Stavanger (to the south).

The population of Halhjem in 1999 was 991, but since 2001 it is considered a part of the urban area of Osøyro.

The ferry quay has two different ferry routes that stop here to cross the Bjørnafjorden. There is a ferry from Halhjem to Våge on the island of Tysnesøya in Tysnes Municipality, to the southeast. There is also a ferry (that is part of the European route E39 highway) from Halhjem to Sandvika, just north of the village of Fitjar in Fitjar Municipality, to the south.
