= Søre Øyane =

Village in Bjørnafjorden Municipality, Norway

- Village
- Interactive map of Søre Øyane
- Coordinates: 60.14469°N 5.37716°E
- Country: Norway
- Region: Western Norway
- County: Vestland
- District: Midhordland
- Municipality: Bjørnafjorden Municipality

Area
  - Total: 1.06 km^{2} (0.41 sq mi)
- Elevation: 6 m (20 ft)

Population (2025)
  - Total: 1,098
  - Density: 1,036/km^{2} (2,680/sq mi)
- Time zone: UTC+01:00 (CET)
  - Summer (DST): UTC+02:00 (CEST)
- Post Code: 5216 Lepsøy

Søre Øyane is a village in Bjørnafjorden Municipality in Vestland county, Norway. It is located on an archipelago in the Bjørnafjorden, off the western coast of the municipality, southeast of the larger island of Strøno. The archipelago consists of four major islands, Røtinga, Bruarøy, Sundøy, and Lepsøy, as well as several smaller islands and islets, many of which are uninhabited. Lepsøy, the northernmost island, is located adjacent to the mainland, which it is connected to by a short bridge. A longer bridge spans the strait between Lepsøy and Sundøy, which in turn is connected to Røtinga and a smaller island, Brattholmen, through Bruarøy.

The 1.06-square-kilometre (260-acre) village has a population (2025) of 1,098 and a population density of 1,036 inhabitants per square kilometre (2,680/sq mi).
