= Søfteland =

Village in Bjørnafjorden Municipality, Norway

Syfteland Søfteland
- Village
- Interactive map of Syfteland
- Coordinates: 60.23802°N 5.45285°E
- Country: Norway
- Region: Western Norway
- County: Vestland
- District: Midhordland
- Municipality: Bjørnafjorden Municipality

Area
  - Total: 1.24 km^{2} (0.48 sq mi)
- Elevation: 67 m (220 ft)

Population (2025)
  - Total: 2,347
  - Density: 1,893/km^{2} (4,900/sq mi)
- Time zone: UTC+01:00 (CET)
  - Summer (DST): UTC+02:00 (CEST)
- Post Code: 5212 Søfteland

Søfteland or Syfteland is a village in Bjørnafjorden Municipality in Vestland county, Norway. It lies on the Bergen Peninsula, along the European route E39 highway, about 6 kilometres (3.7 mi) north of the municipal centre of Osøyro and about 20 kilometres (12 mi) south of the city of Bergen. The mountain Møsnuken lies about 3.5 kilometres (2.2 mi) east of the village and the mountain Lyshornet lies about 2.3 kilometres (1.4 mi) west of the village.

The 1.24-square-kilometre (310-acre) village has a population (2025) of 2,347 and a population density of 1,893 inhabitants per square kilometre (4,900/sq mi).
