= Søvik, Vestland =

Village in Bjørnafjorden Municipality, Norway

Søvik Søvika
- Village
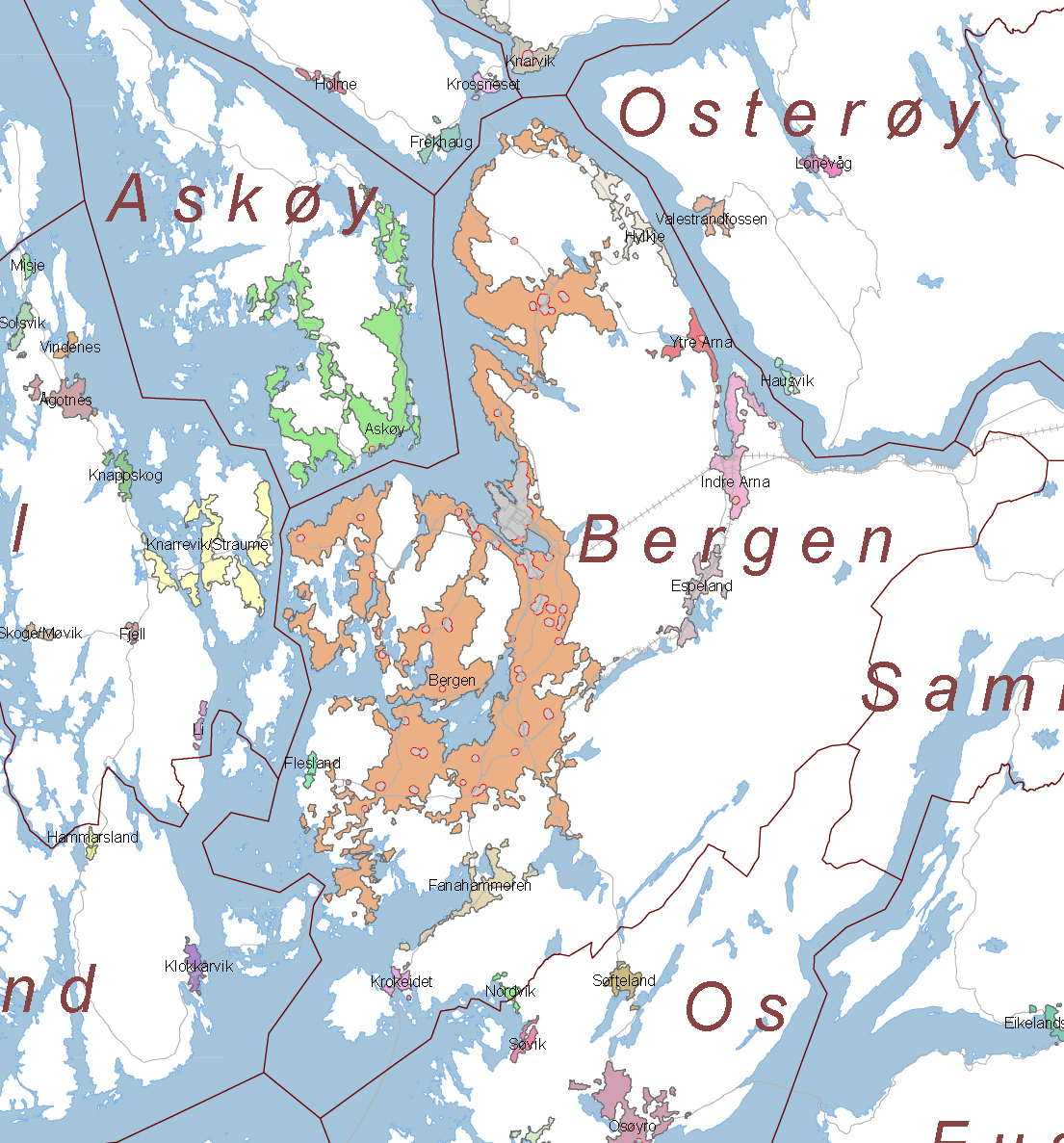
- View of a map of the village of Søvik (bottom center) in the Os region.
- Interactive map of Søvik
- Coordinates: 60.21237°N 5.38502°E
- Country: Norway
- Region: Western Norway
- County: Vestland
- District: Midhordland
- Municipality: Bjørnafjorden Municipality

Area
  - Total: 1.24 km^{2} (0.48 sq mi)
- Elevation: 19 m (62 ft)

Population (2019)
  - Total: 1,622
  - Density: 1,319/km^{2} (3,420/sq mi)
- Time zone: UTC+01:00 (CET)
  - Summer (DST): UTC+02:00 (CEST)
- Post Code: 5215 Lysekloster

Søvik is a village in Bjørnafjorden Municipality in Vestland county, Norway. The village lies at the eastern end of the Lysefjorden, a short distance south of the city of Bergen. The area is notable for the ancient ruins of the Lyse Abbey, located on the northeast side of the village. The Lyshornet mountain lies about 3 kilometres (1.9 mi) north of the village.

== Population ==
Historical population
Year	Pop.	±%
2005	723	—
2006	734	+1.5%
2007	755	+2.9%
2008	784	+3.8%
2009	789	+0.6%
2013	1,446	+83.3%
Source: Statistics Norway

The village of Nordvik is located in Bergen Municipality and the village of Søvik is located just to the south in Bjørnafjorden Municipality. The villages have been growing together in recent years due to conurbation. In 2013, Statistics Norway started included the neighboring village of Nordvik as part of the "urban area" of Søvik. This has increased the size and area of Søvik, and it now is an urban area that spans two different municipalities. The 1.24-square-kilometre (310-acre) urban area of Søvik has a population (2025) of 1,629 and a population density of 1,314 inhabitants per square kilometre (3,400/sq mi). Of that total size, 0.3 square kilometres (74 acres)—with 366 residents—is in Bergen Municipality and 0.94 square kilometres (230 acres)—with 1,263 residents—is in Bjørnafjorden Municipality.
