= Lyse Abbey =

Ruined Cistercian monastery

Coordinates: 60°13′40″N 5°24′20″E

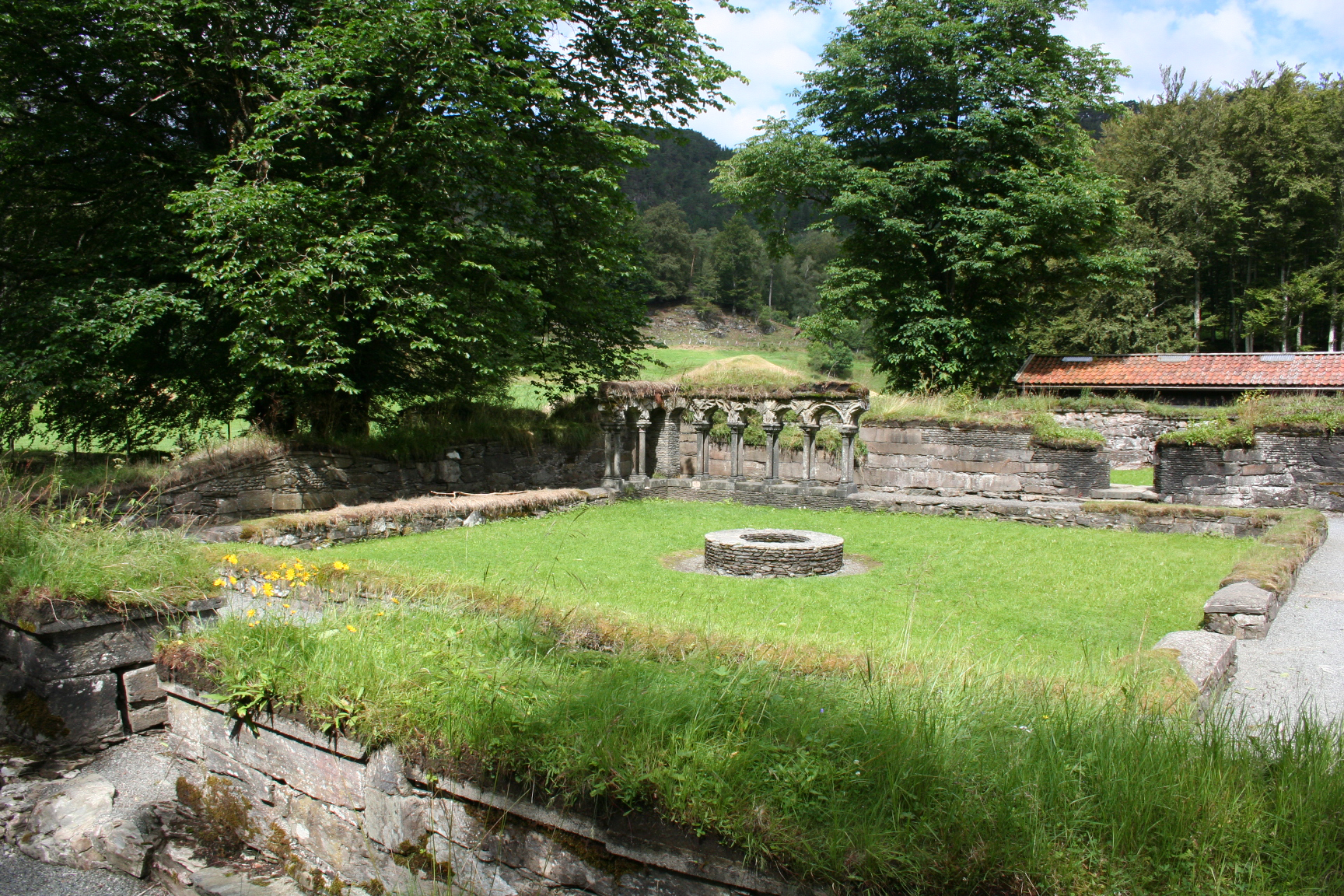
View of the monastery courtyard

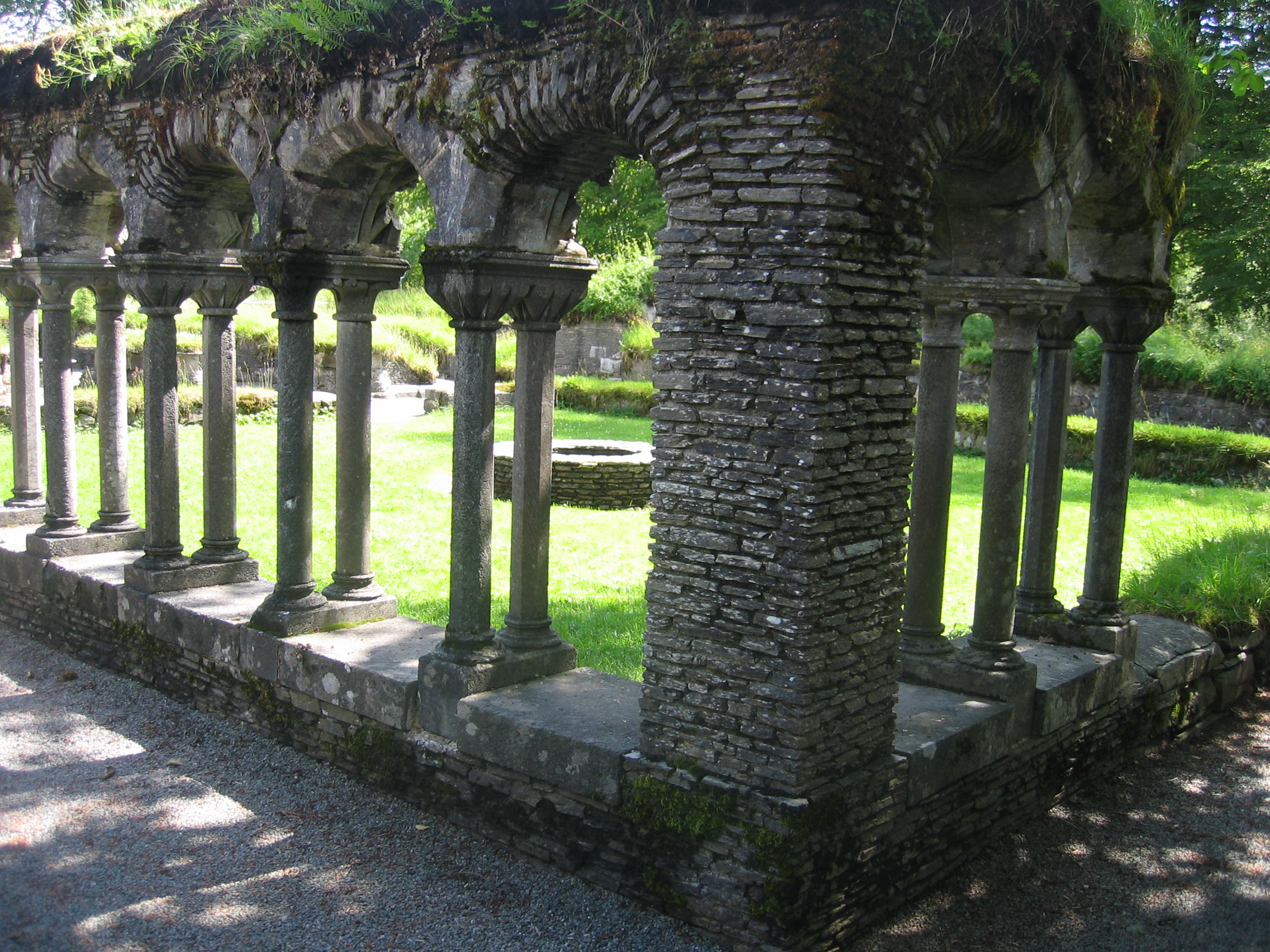
View of the monastery courtyard through the remains of the cloister, facing south-east

Lyse Abbey or Saint Mary's Abbey, Lyse (Norwegian: Lyse kloster, Lyse Mariakloster) is a now-ruined Cistercian monastery in Bjørnafjorden Municipality in Vestland county in south-western Norway. The name "Lyse" is derived from Lysefjorden near which the building stood. The abbey lies at the southern base of the Lyshornet mountain.

== Pre-Reformation ==
Lyse Abbey was founded in 1146 by Sigurd, Bishop of the Ancient Diocese of Bergen, on farmland that he owned, as the Christianisation of Norway was nearing completion. The first monks were brought from Fountains Abbey in Yorkshire, England. This was the first Cistercian monastery in Norway and was modelled on others built in England and France.

As with many Cistercians, the monks developed considerable skill in farming operations and management. Over time, the abbey acquired many farms in the area, making it ever more rich and powerful. In all, the monastery had about 50 other farms in Os with at least as many more in other areas. It ran a popular inn in Bergen, where the abbey's products were sold.

== After the Reformation ==
The abbey was dissolved in 1536 when Christian III of Denmark decreed Lutheranism to be the state religion of Norway. The abbey's possessions were confiscated, becoming the property of the king. Soapstone made up much of the building material. Over the next two centuries, the stones of the monastery structures were gradually removed and contributed to buildings such as the Rosenkrantz Tower in Bergen], and Kronborg Castle in Helsingør in Denmark.

== The monastery today ==
The ruins of the buildings were excavated in 1822 and 1838 and restored around 1930. The ruins are protected as a national monument and archaeological work to preserve and record the site continues. The monastery is a well-visited tourist site with good nature walks nearby.
