= List of stave churches in Norway =

A stave church (Norwegian: stavkirke) is a church built of timbers with a supporting structure of posts (pillars) standing on reclining sleepers or timbers and carrying poles. The structural joints in the wall form frames that are filled with standing planks or tiles. The poles (Norwegian: stavene) have given name to this church type. Stave churches are now considered to be among the most important representatives of European medieval architecture in wood and are represented by the Urnes Stave Church on the UNESCO World Heritage List.

This list contains 28 preserved stave churches. Reference is also made to the Fantoft Stave Church, which is a reconstruction of the church destroyed by arson; Vang Church, which is today in Poland; and two of the churches that were built in the 1600s with inspiration from the stave churches Fåvang Stave Church and Vågå Church. Furthermore, churches such as Uvdal Church (1893) and Our Lady of Good Counsel Church, Porsgrunn (1899) that are constructed in dragon style inspired by stave churches, are not included in this list.

== Lost stave churches ==
In the Middle Ages there were probably over 1,000 stave churches in Norway, but most disappeared in the period 1350–1650, probably as a result of changing needs after the Black Death and the Reformation. In 1650, there were about 270 stave churches left in Norway, and over the next hundred years, 136 of them disappeared. Around the year 1800, there were still 95 existing stave churches, while over 200 former stave churches were still known by name or written sources (according to Lorentz Dietrichson). From 1850 to 1885, 32 stave churches were lost, but only Fantoft Stave Church has been lost since then.

After the Reformation, some stave churches were enlarged or rebuilt with log construction. For example, Flesberg Stave Church was expanded to a cross church (cruciform) with the cross arms in timber logs, while the Rømskog Church that was built with stave construction was replaced by a church in timber logs. Also Old Hol Church was originally a stave church, but was rebuilt or expanded until there was little trace of the original building. Vågå Church is sometimes referred to as a stave church, but is the result of extensive reconstruction with reuse of materials from the rebuilt stave church.

The existing stave churches are concentrated on the upper valley regions of Eastern Norway (Østlandet) including Gudbrandsdalen, Numedal, Hallingdal, Valdres, and Telemark. They can also be found in the inner fjord regions of Western Norway (Vestlandet). Exceptions are in particular the two stave churches that have been moved to Bergen and Oslo, and Grip Stave Church which is located on a vacated island in the sea. A map of the 322 stave churches known in 1800 shows that there were the most stave churches in the least populated areas, while there are most stone churches in the cities, in settlements that were less mountainous (Østlandet and Trøndelag), along the coast, and in the largest church parish in the fjords in Vestlandet. There were mostly stave churches in the mountain valleys and forest villages, and in fishing villages on the islands and smaller fjord arms. Where the parish churches were in stone, the annex chapels could be a stave church. For example, the main church in Aurland Municipality (Vangen Church) is in stone, while there is a stave church in Undredal and there was probably a stave church in Flåm.

== Preserved stave churches ==
=== Buskerud county ===
| Church | Photo | Municipality | Year |
|---|---|---|---|
| Flesberg | | Flesberg Municipality | After 1111 |
| Gol | | Gol Municipality (now at the Norwegian Museum of Cultural History, Oslo) | After 1216 |
| Nore | | Nore og Uvdal Municipality (now operated by the Fortidsminneforeningen) | After 1166–1167 |
| Rollag | | Rollag Municipality | Before 1482 |
| Torpo | | Ål Municipality (now operated by the Fortidsminneforeningen) | After 1192 |
| Uvdal | | Nore og Uvdal Municipality (now operated by the Fortidsminneforeningen) | After 1168 |

=== Innlandet county ===
| Church | Photo | Municipality | Year |
|---|---|---|---|
| Garmo | | Lom Municipality, now at Maihaugen | 1157-1158 |
| Hedalen | | Sør-Aurdal Municipality | 1150-1200 |
| Hegge | | Øystre Slidre Municipality | After 1216 |
| Høre | | Vang Municipality | 1180 |
| Lom | | Lom Municipality | 1150-1200 |
| Lomen | | Vestre Slidre Municipality | Woodwork from 1179 |
| Reinli | | Sør-Aurdal Municipality | After 1326 |
| Ringebu | | Ringebu Municipality | 1220 |
| Øye | | Vang Municipality | c. 1200 |
In addition: Fåvang Stave Church in Ringebu Municipality – Extensive reconstruction, reclassified; Vang Stave Church from Vang Municipality – disassembled and moved to the Giant Mountains in Poland in the 1800s; Vågå Church in Vågå Municipality – Extensive reconstruction, reclassified

=== Møre og Romsdal county ===
| Church | Photo | Municipality | Year |
|---|---|---|---|
| Grip | | Kristiansund Municipality | 1450-1500 |
| Kvernes | | Averøy Municipality (now operated by the Fortidsminneforeningen) | 1633 |
| Rødven | | Rauma Municipality (now operated by the Fortidsminneforeningen) | c. 1200 |

=== Telemark county ===
| Church | Photo | Municipality | Year |
|---|---|---|---|
| Eidsborg | | Tokke Municipality | 1200s |
| Heddal | | Notodden Municipality | 1200s |

=== Trøndelag county ===
| Church | Photo | Municipality | Year |
|---|---|---|---|
| Haltdalen Stave Church | Haltdalen Stave Church | Holtålen Municipality (now at Trøndelag Museum in Trondheim Municipality) | 1170 |

=== Vestfold county ===
| Church | Photo | Municipality | Year |
|---|---|---|---|
| Høyjord | | Sandefjord Municipality | maybe 1275 |

=== Vestland county ===
| Church | Photo | Municipality | Year |
|---|---|---|---|
| Borgund | | Lærdal Municipality (now operated by the Fortidsminneforeningen) | 1150–1200 |
| Hopperstad | | Vik Municipality (now operated by the Fortidsminneforeningen) | c. 1130 |
| Kaupanger | | Sogndal Municipality | c. 1190 |
| Røldal | | Ullensvang Municipality | 1200s |
| Undredal | | Aurland Municipality | 1147 |
| Urnes | | Luster Municipality (now operated by the Fortidsminneforeningen) | 1130 |
In addition: Fantoft Stave Church at Fantoft in Bergen Municipality - original building burned down; a copy of it was rebuilt in its place

== See also ==
- List of archaeological sites and dismantled stave churches
- Stave church
- Medieval Scandinavian architecture
- Post church
- Palisade church
