= Holdhus Church =

Church in Vestland, Norway

- Holdhus kyrkje
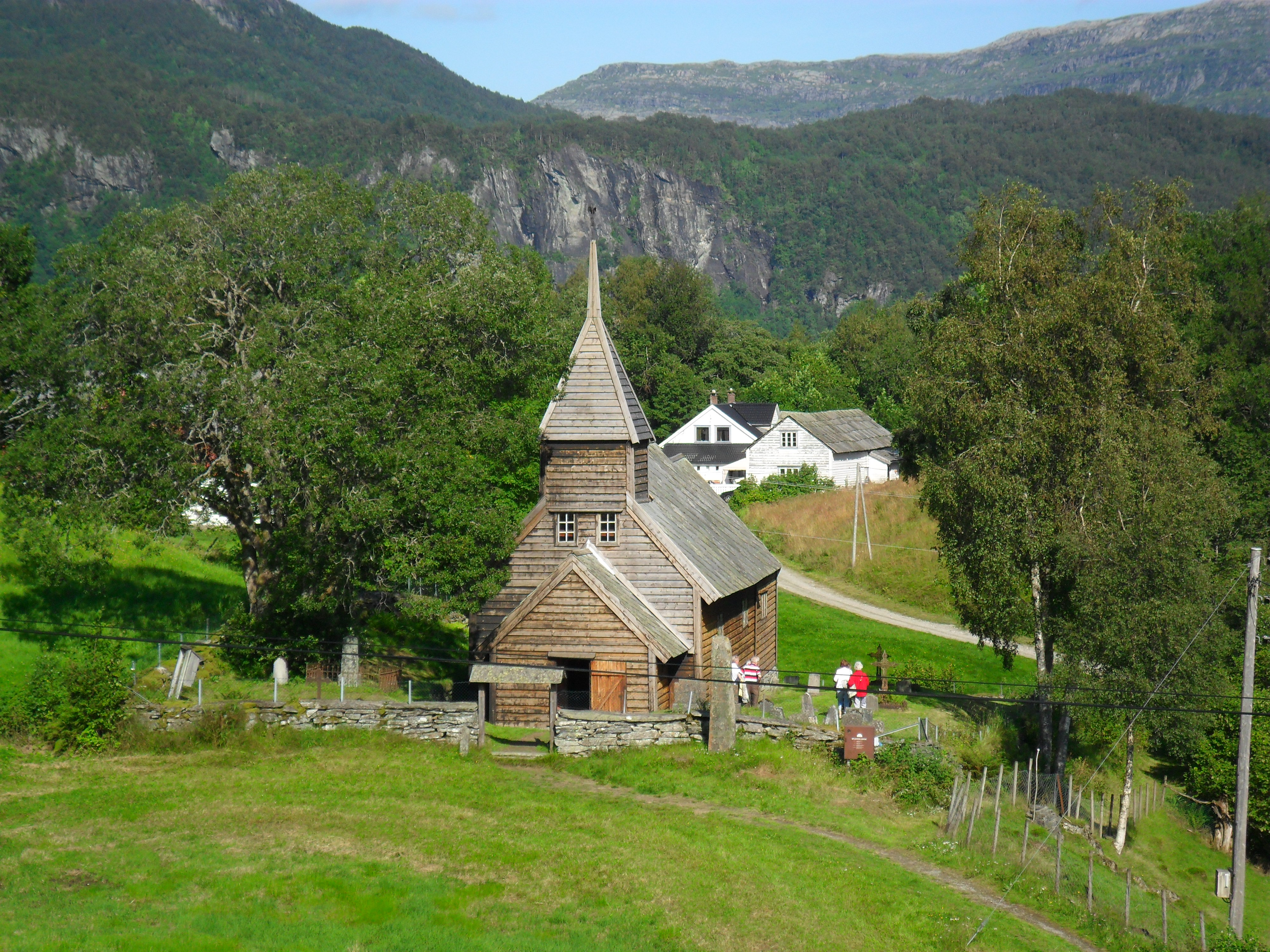
- View of the church
- Holdhus Church
- 60°14′35″N 5°49′59″E
- Location: Bjørnafjorden, Vestland
- Country: Norway
- Denomination: Church of Norway
- Previous denomination: Catholic Church
- Churchmanship: Evangelical Lutheran

History
- Former name: Hålandsdalen kyrkje
- Status: Parish church
- Founded: 13th century
- Consecrated: 1726

Architecture
- Functional status: Museum
- Architectural type: Long church
- Completed: 1726 (300 years ago)
- Closed: 1890

Specifications
- Capacity: 90
- Materials: Wood

Administration
- Diocese: Bjørgvin bispedømme
- Deanery: Fana prosti
- Parish: Fusa
- Norwegian Cultural Heritage Site
- Type: Church
- Status: Automatically protected
- ID: 84596

Holdhus Church (Norwegian: Holdhus kyrkje; historically called Hålandsdal kyrkje) is a former parish church of the Church of Norway in Bjørnafjorden Municipality in Vestland county, Norway. It is located in the village of Holdhus. Although it is no longer regularly used, it is one of the churches that is part of the Fusa parish which is part of the Fana prosti (deanery) in the Diocese of Bjørgvin. The brown, wooden church was built in a long church design in 1726, although part of the building dates to 1618. The church seats about 90 people. The church is notable for its interior decorations. The walls are covered in Rosemaling, a type of Norwegian folk-art.

== History ==
The earliest existing historical records of the church date back to the year 1306, but that is not the year of construction. The first church in the Hålandsdal valley was a wooden stave church and it was called Hålandsdal kyrkje. It was likely built during the 13th century. In 1618, the old choir of the church was torn down and a new timber-framed choir was built in its place. In 1726, the old nave was torn down and replaced with a new timber-framed nave which seated 90 people. This new nave was attached to the choir that had been built in 1618. After this, there were no more medieval parts of the church still standing. In 1890, the new Hålandsdal Church was completed about 3 kilometres (1.9 mi) to the southeast. When the new church was built, this church was no longer regularly-used as a parish church. In 1889, the old church was sold to Hans H. Holdhus for demolition within two years, but in 1890, Holdhus sold it to the Society for the Preservation of Ancient Norwegian Monuments. Since then it has been a museum called Holdhus kyrkje and it is still used by the parish for special occasions. The new owners provided a comprehensive repair and restoration project for the building in 1905–1906 which was led by the architect Schak Bull.

== Media gallery ==
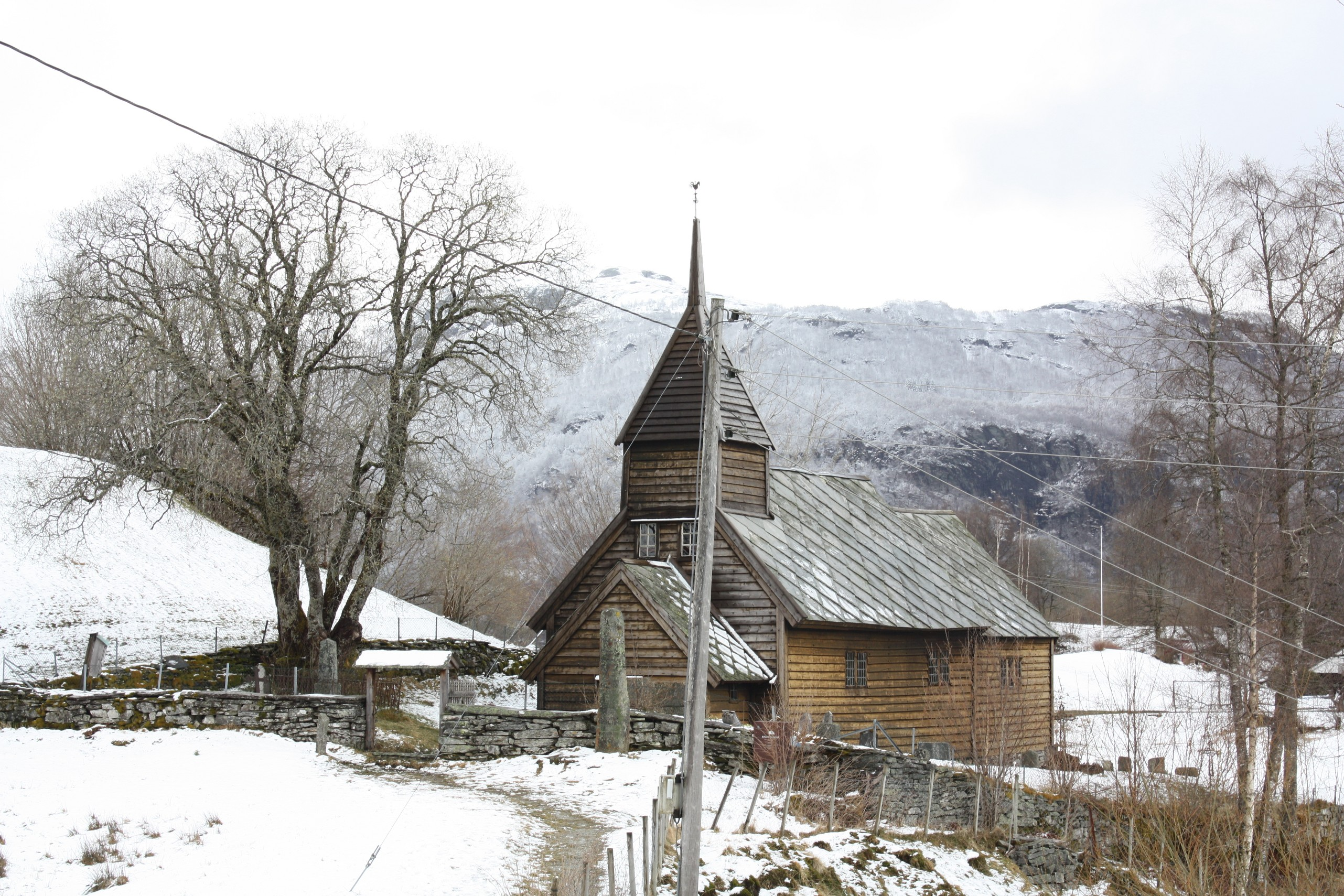
Winter view of the church

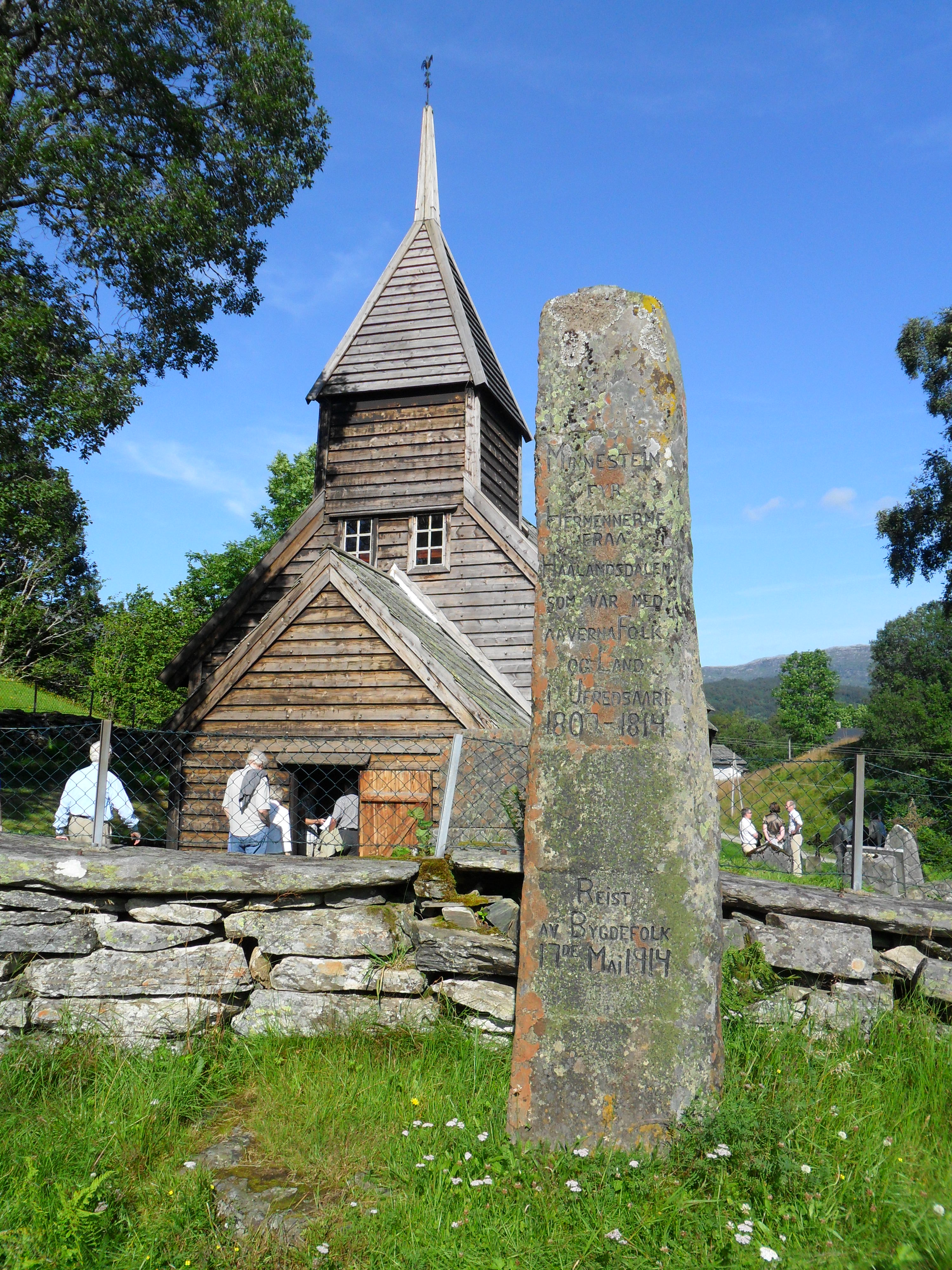
Summer view of the church

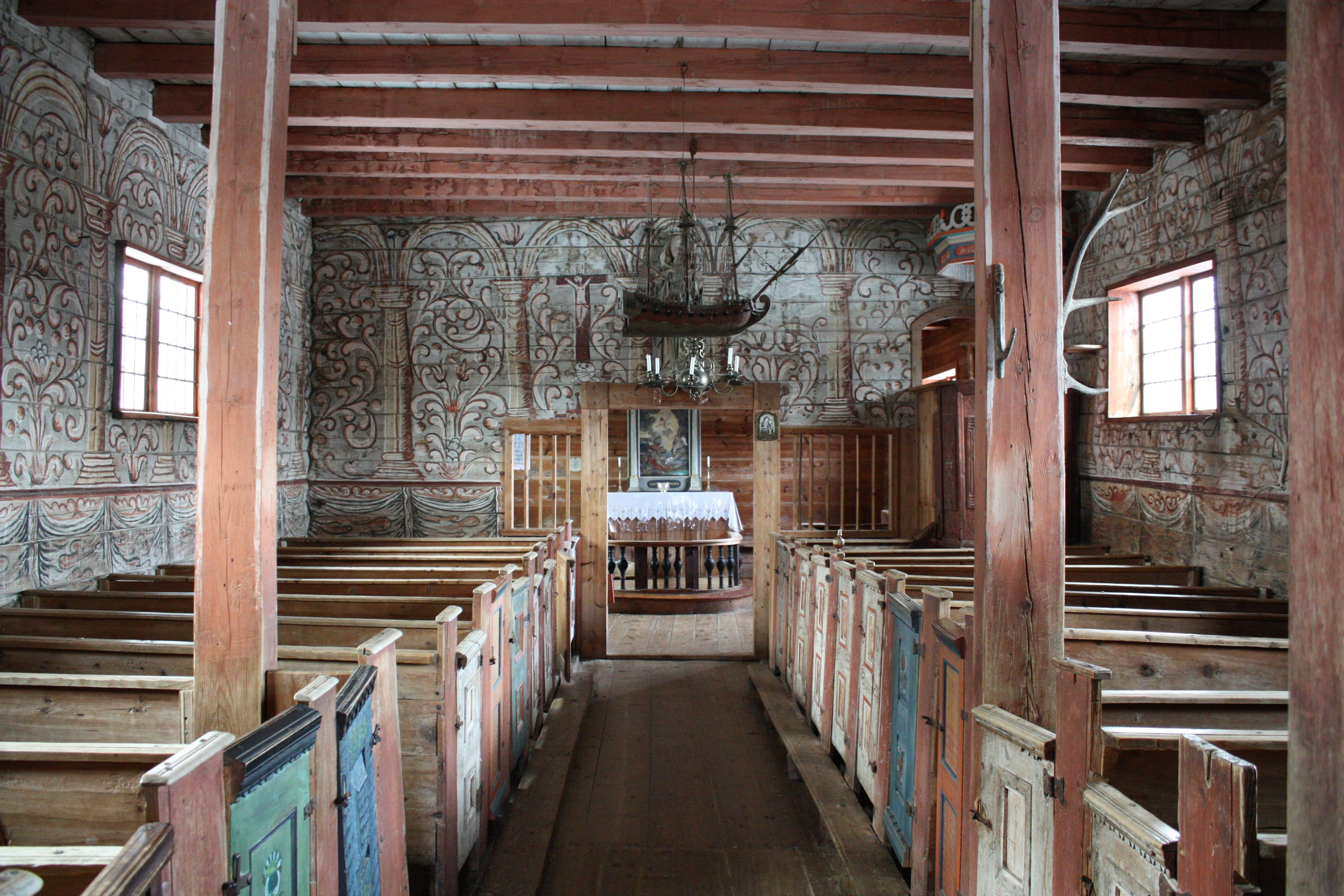
Interior of the church

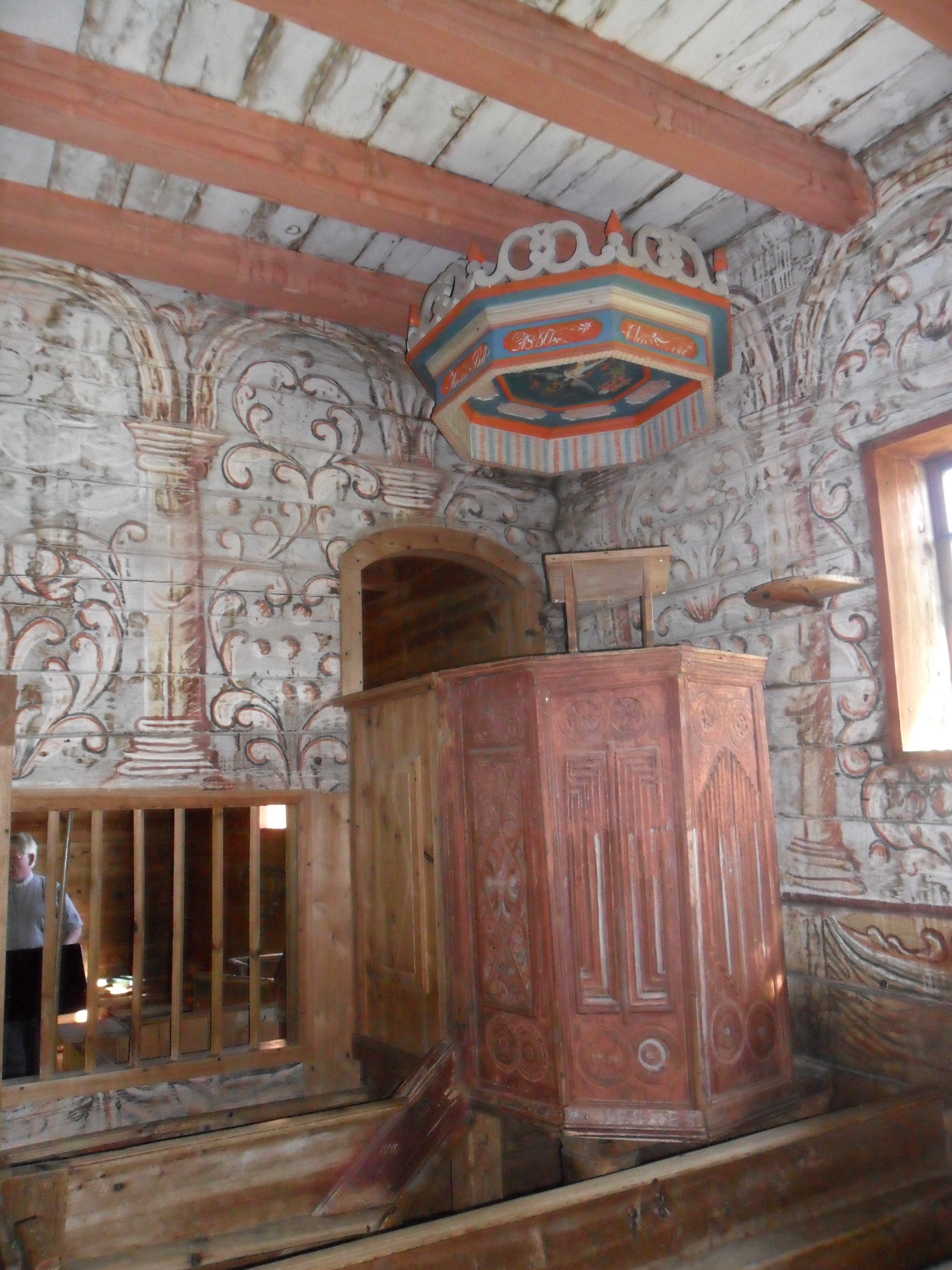
View of the pulpit

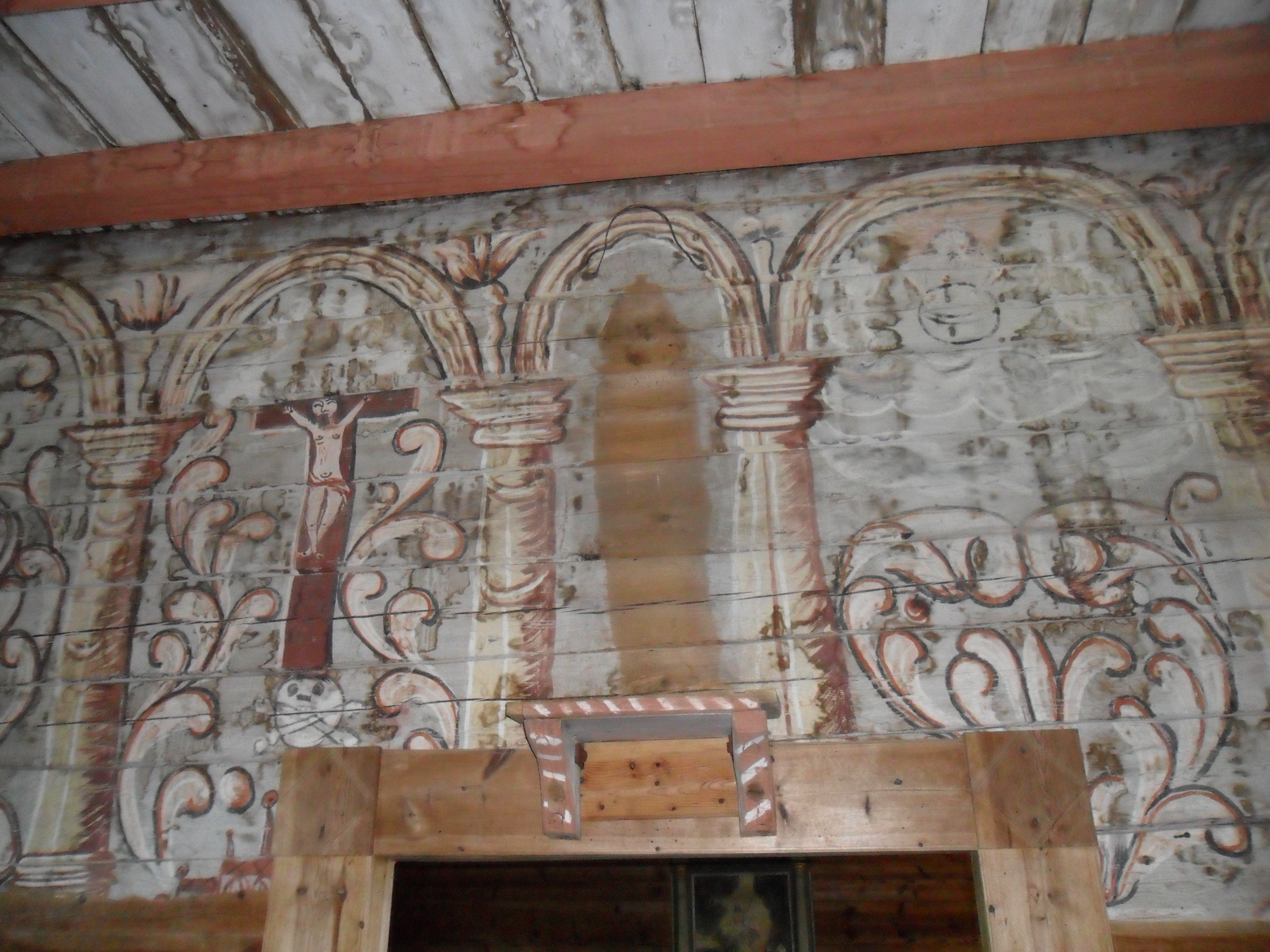
View of the rosemaling on the interior walls

== See also ==
- List of churches in Bjørgvin
