= Per Lysne =

Norwegian-American folk artist

Per Lysne (December 9, 1880 – September 21, 1947) was a Norwegian-American artist most associated with bringing the traditional Norwegian folk art of Rosemaling to the United States.

== Biography ==
Per Andersen Lysne was born on the Ljøsne farm in Lærdal Municipality in Nordre Bergenhus county, Norway.

He had been trained in rosemaling by Anders Olsen, an artist whose work was recognized at the Exposition Universelle at Paris in 1893. Lysne married Ingeborg Nundal (1882–1940) in 1906. Lysne and his wife immigrated to Stoughton, Wisconsin in 1907. After the death of his first wife, Lysne married Olga Ethun (1882–1956) in 1945. He died at a Stoughton hospital in 1947 following a heart attack.

Lysne specialized in redecorating antique chests and painting large platters. He developed a thriving rosemaling enterprise and taught the art to a select few. His signature piece, the smorgasbord plate, was not an object that typically had been decorated, but Lysne's new form had a pervasive influence. Lysne also decorated home interiors in southeastern Wisconsin.

The Stoughton Historical Museum has an exhibit devoted to Lysne's work. The Per Lysne Collection is maintained at the Vesterheim Norwegian-American Museum.

== Other sources ==
- The Fathers of American Decorative Painting (The Decorative Arts Collection. Gretchen Cagle Publications, Inc.)
- Benedict, Claus Matthias (ed) (2012) Per Lysne (Phon) ISBN 9786138768371
