= Uvdal Church =

Church in Buskerud, Norway

- Uvdal kirke
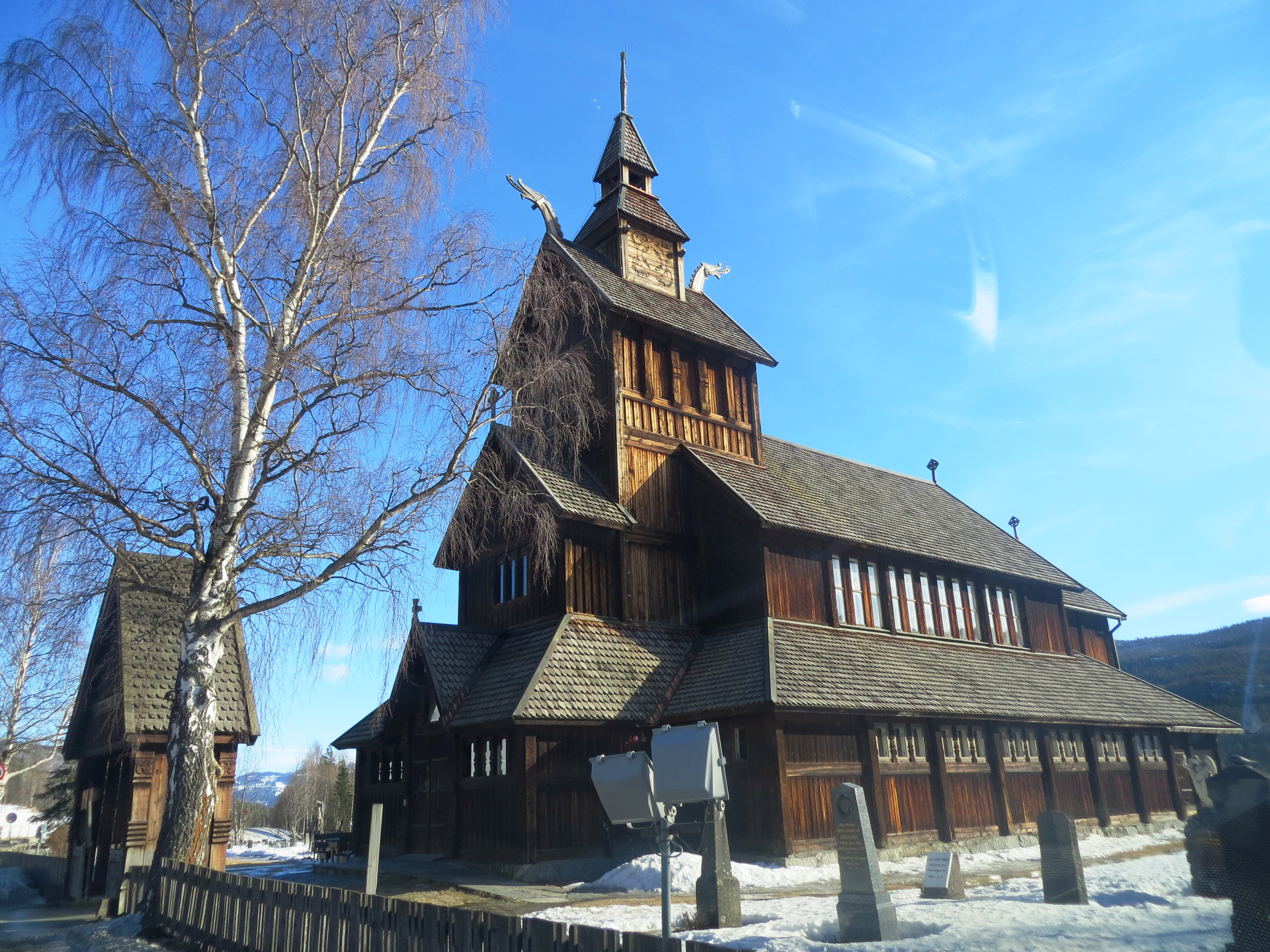
- View of the church
- Uvdal Church
- 60°16′10″N 8°45′10″E
- Location: Nore og Uvdal, Buskerud
- Country: Norway
- Denomination: Church of Norway
- Churchmanship: Evangelical Lutheran

History
- Status: Parish church
- Founded: 1893
- Consecrated: 30 May 1893

Architecture
- Functional status: Active
- Architect: Henrik Bull
- Architectural type: Long church
- Completed: 1893 (133 years ago)

Specifications
- Capacity: 350
- Materials: Wood

Administration
- Diocese: Tunsberg
- Deanery: Kongsberg prosti
- Parish: Uvdal
- Norwegian Cultural Heritage Site
- Type: Church
- Status: Listed
- ID: 176018

Uvdal Church (Norwegian: Uvdal kirke) is a parish church of the Church of Norway in Nore og Uvdal Municipality in Buskerud county, Norway. It is located in the village of Uvdal. It is one of the churches for the Uvdal parish which is part of the Kongsberg prosti (deanery) in the Diocese of Tunsberg. The brown, wooden church was built in a long church design in 1893 using plans drawn up by the architect Henrik Bull. The church seats about 350 people.

== History ==
The old Uvdal Stave Church served the people living in the Uvdal prestegjeld from the latter half of the 12th century until the late 19th century. At the end of the 19th century it was in poor condition and too small for the congregation, so it was decided to build a new church. The old church was located on the hillside overlooking the valley, but it was decided to build the new church on the valley floor, along the main road, about 4.5 kilometres (2.8 mi) west of the old church. The new church was designed by Henrik Bull and it was consecrated on 30 May 1893. The new church is a wooden long church that is clearly influenced by the design of the ancient stave church architecture, including in the tower structure with dragon heads. After the new church was completed, the old church was taken out of regular use. The church was remodeled in 1961–1963 by the architect Henrik Nissen Biong.

== Media gallery ==
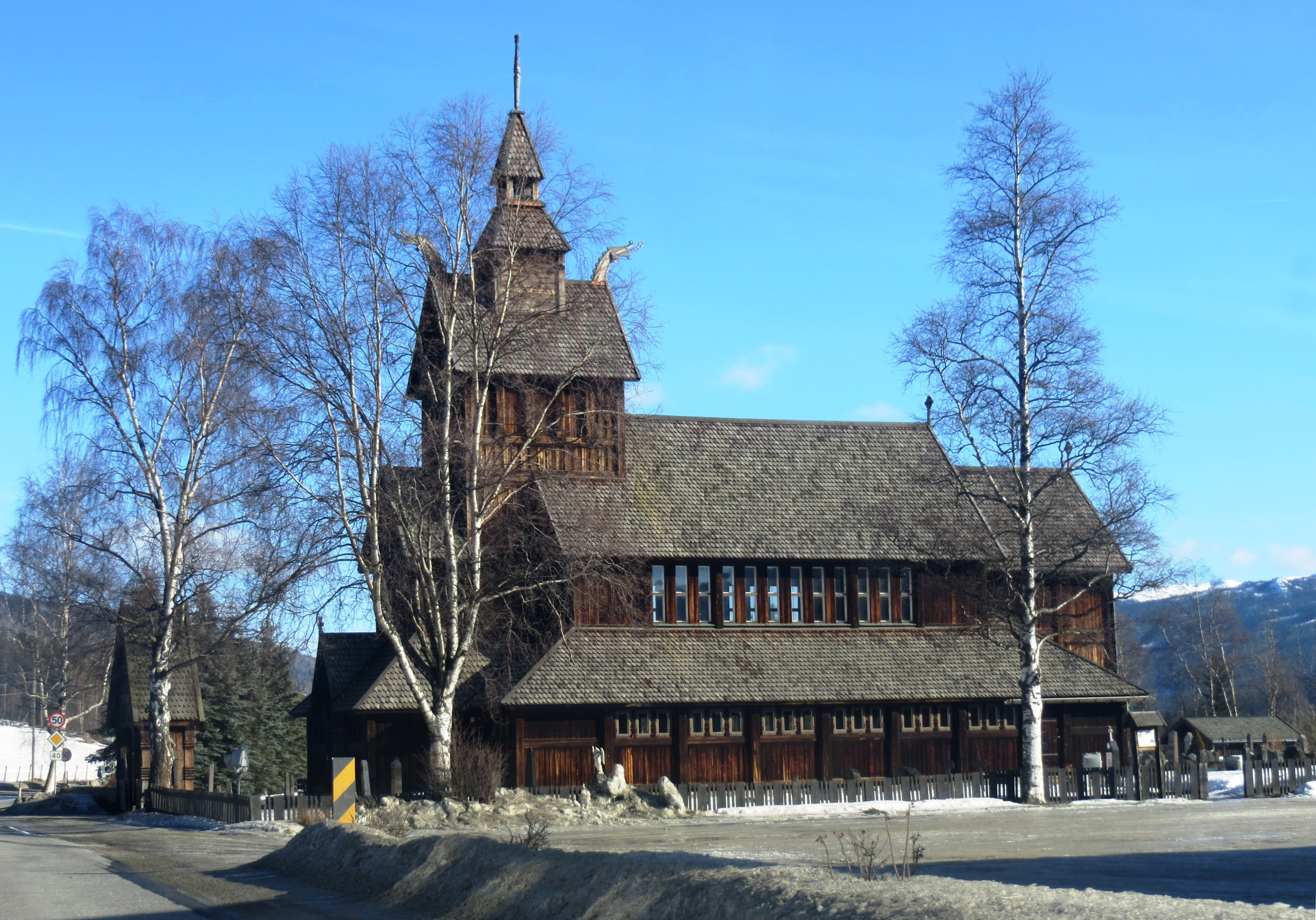

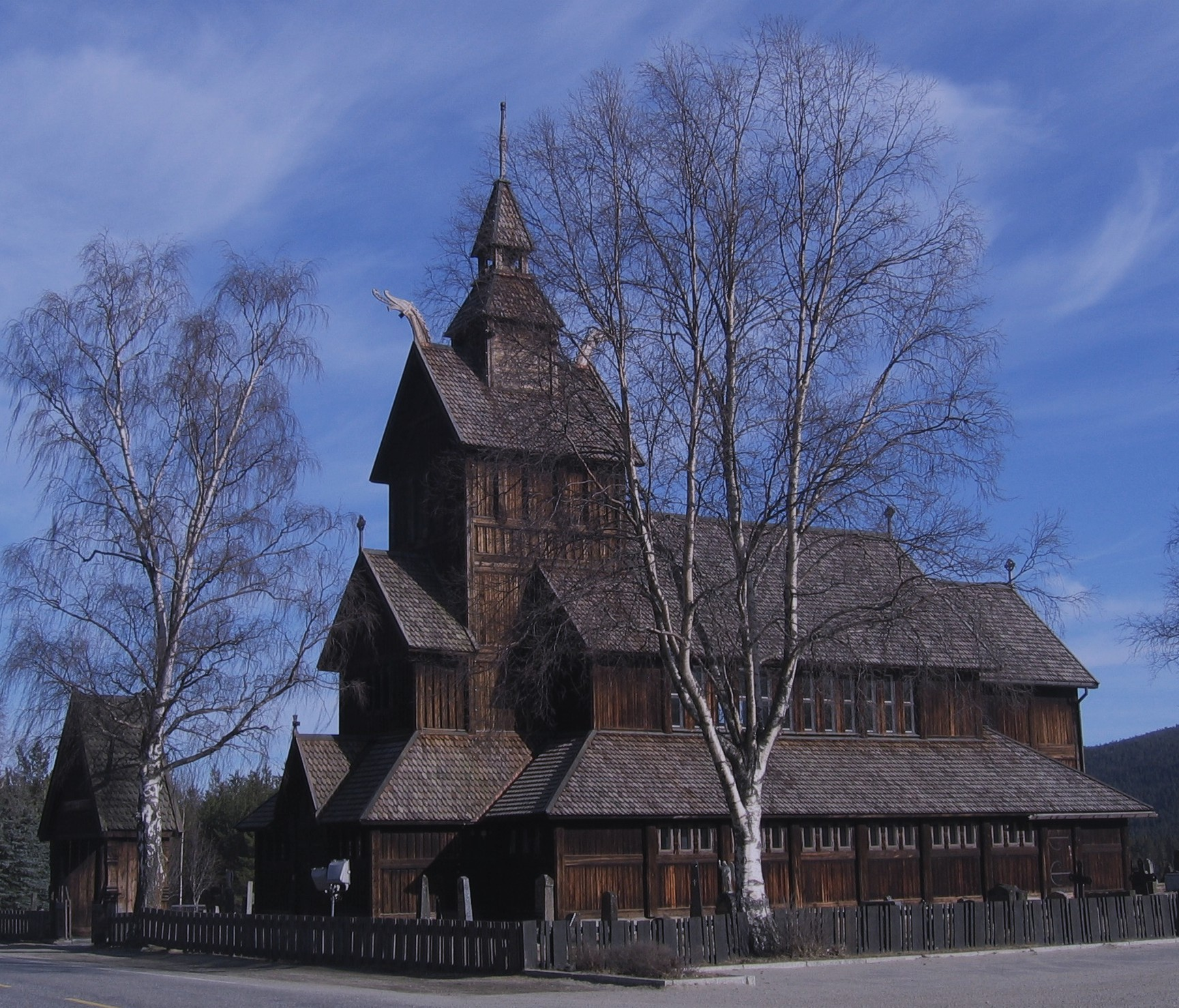

== See also ==
- List of churches in Tunsberg
