= Uvdal Stave Church =

Church in Buskerud, Norway

- Uvdal stavkirke
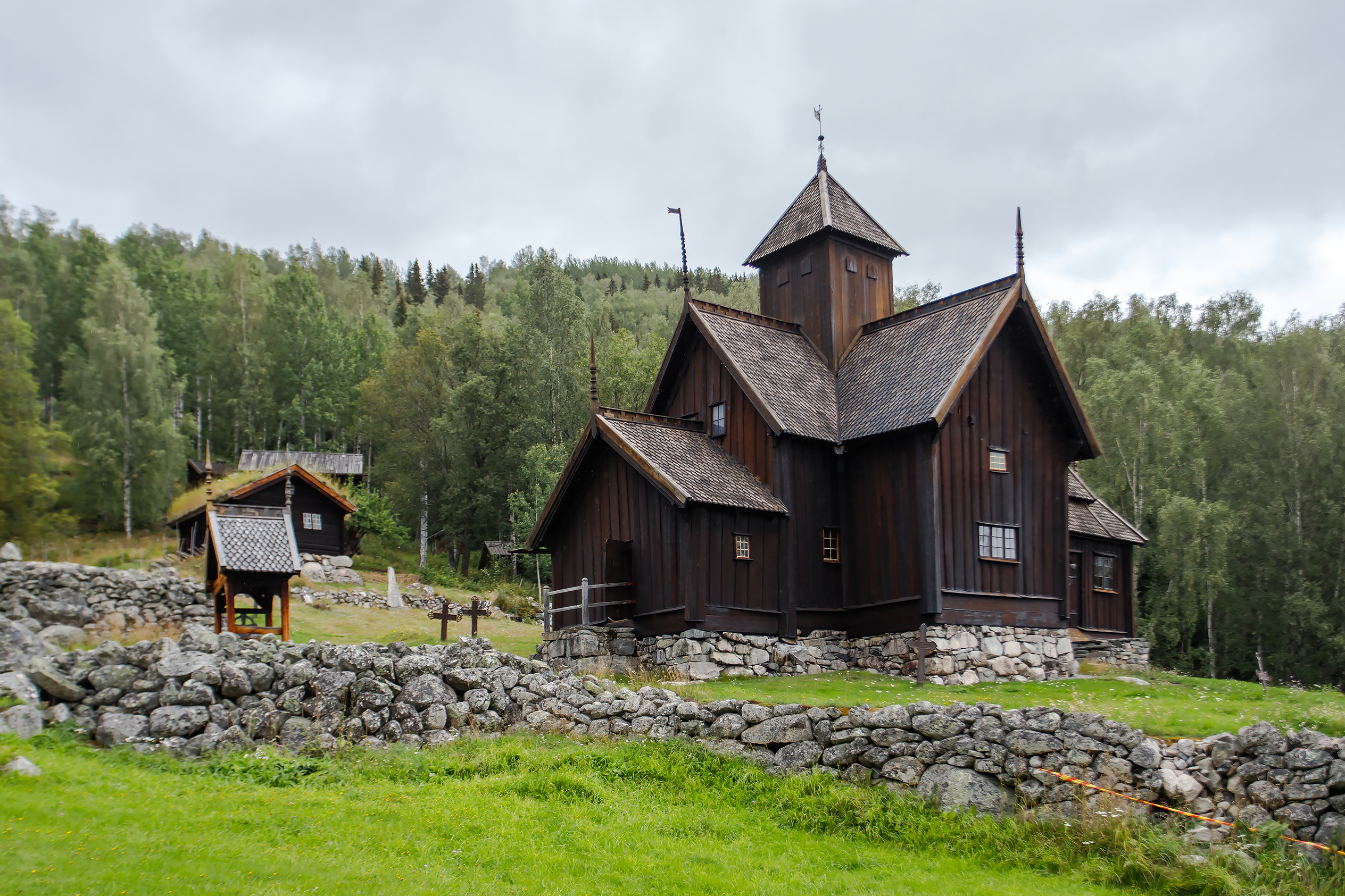
- View of the church
- Uvdal Stave Church
- 60°15′55″N 8°50′05″E
- Location: Nore og Uvdal Municipality, Buskerud
- Country: Norway
- Denomination: Church of Norway
- Previous denomination: Catholic Church
- Churchmanship: Evangelical Lutheran

History
- Status: Parish church
- Founded: c. 1168
- Consecrated: c. 1168

Architecture
- Functional status: Active
- Architectural type: Stave church
- Style: Cruciform
- Completed: c. 1168 (858 years ago)

Specifications
- Capacity: 120
- Materials: Wood

Administration
- Diocese: Tunsberg
- Deanery: Kongsberg prosti
- Parish: Uvdal
- Norwegian Cultural Heritage Site
- Type: Church
- Status: Automatically protected
- ID: 85738

Uvdal Stave Church (Norwegian: Uvdal stavkirke) is a historic parish church of the Church of Norway in Nore og Uvdal Municipality in Buskerud county, Norway. It is located in the village of Uvdal. It is one of the churches for the Uvdal parish which is part of the Kongsberg prosti (deanery) in the Diocese of Tunsberg. The brown, wooden church was built in a cruciform stave church design around the year 1168. The church seats about 120 people.

== History ==
The earliest existing historical records of the church date back to the year 1327, but the church was not built that year. The first church in Uvdal was likely a small wooden stave church that was built around the year 1100. An archeological excavation that took place during 1978 showed that the present-day church was built on the remains of a previous church. It is thought to have been made with the use of embedded corner column technology at the beginning of the 11th century.

A new stave church was constructed on the same site just after the year 1168, which is known through dendrochronological dating of the ore-pine used in the construction. The logs were not completely dry when the construction took place. This new church was small since most Norwegian churches made during the 12th century were usually very small, often no more than 40 square metres (430 sq ft). The churches often expanded later, even during the Middle Ages and certainly just before and after the Reformation, which took place during 1537 in Norway.

The nave of the church was first expanded to the west during the Middle Ages, when the original apse of the chancel was also removed and the chancel itself elongated. Again, during that period, an extra center column was added. The chancel was torn down in 1684, when a new and wider chancel was made, with the same width as the nave. Then, during the period 1721–1723, the church was enlarged by adding two transepts, giving it a cruciform design. A new ridge turret had to be made, to fit the new shape. Later, in 1819, a new sacristy was added to the north wall of the chancel.

At the end of the 19th century, this church was in poor condition and too small for the congregation, so it was decided to build a new Uvdal Church. The old stave church was located on the hillside overlooking the valley, but it was decided to build the new church on the valley floor, along the main road, about 4.5 kilometres (2.8 mi) west of the old church. After the old church was consecrated in 1893, the stave church was taken out of regular use. It is still used on special occasions in the summers, but it primarily has been saved as a museum. It is now owned by Society for the Preservation of Ancient Norwegian Monuments, which also owns other historic stave churches.

=== Exterior ===
The exterior walls were paneled to cover the log walls in 1760.

=== Interior ===
Benches with ornately decorated sidewalls were added to the nave in 1624. The oldest part of the interior was probably richly ornately decorated by painting during 1656, the expansions during 1684 and 1723. Two scary halfmasks are quite visible on the poles of the chancel, and according to myth they were able to capture demons.

== Media gallery ==
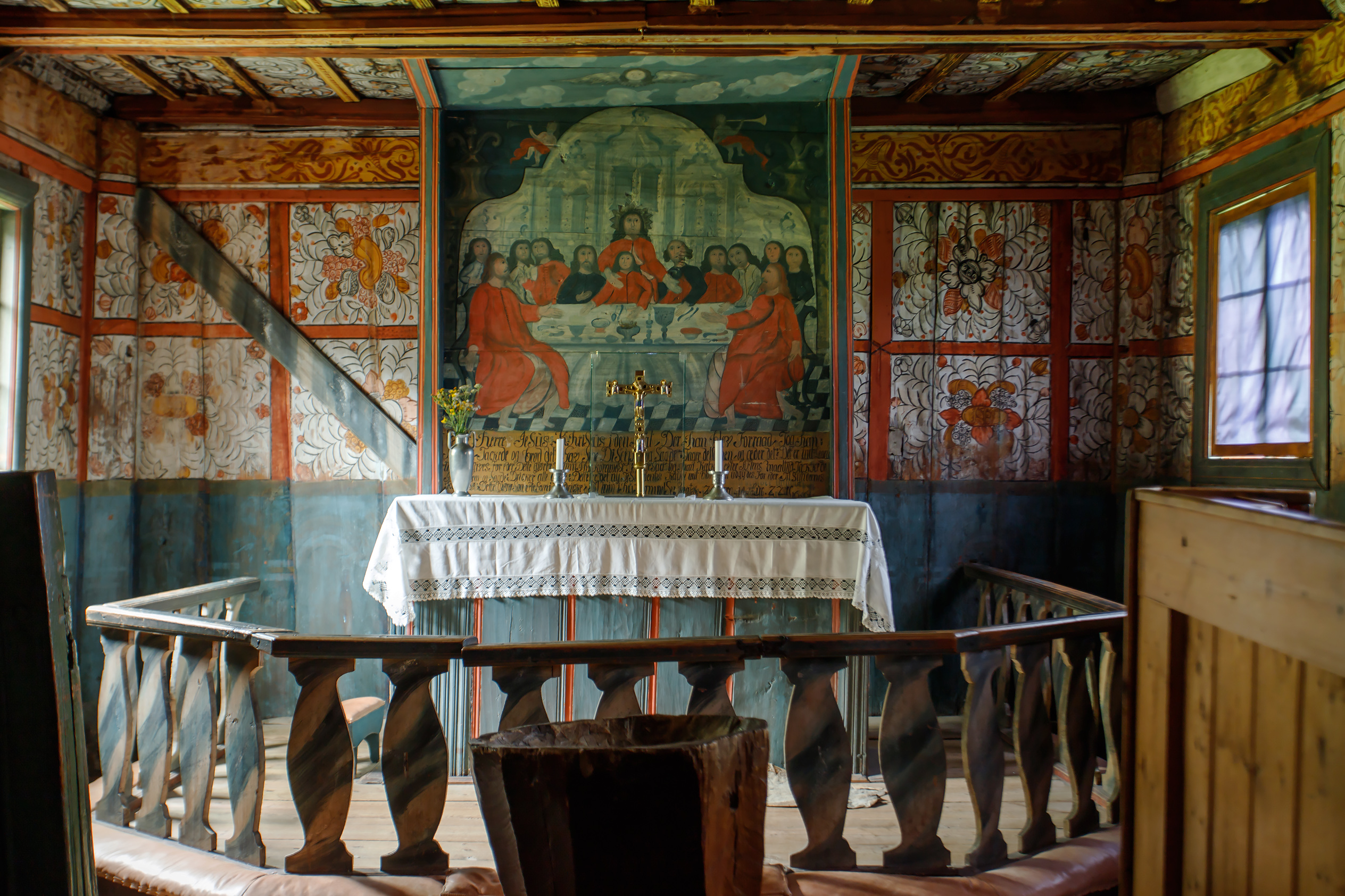
Uvdal Church interior

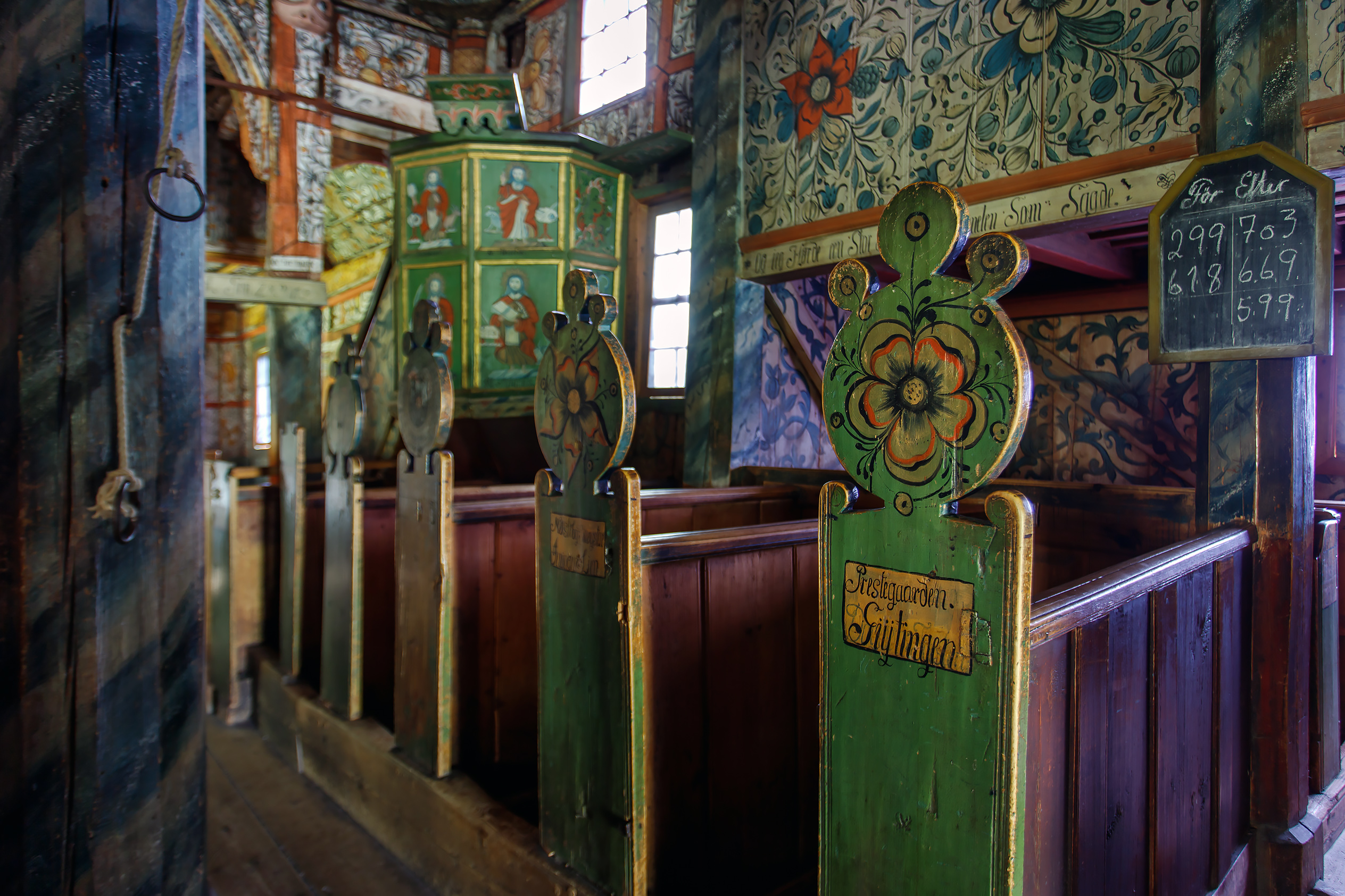
Uvdal Church interior

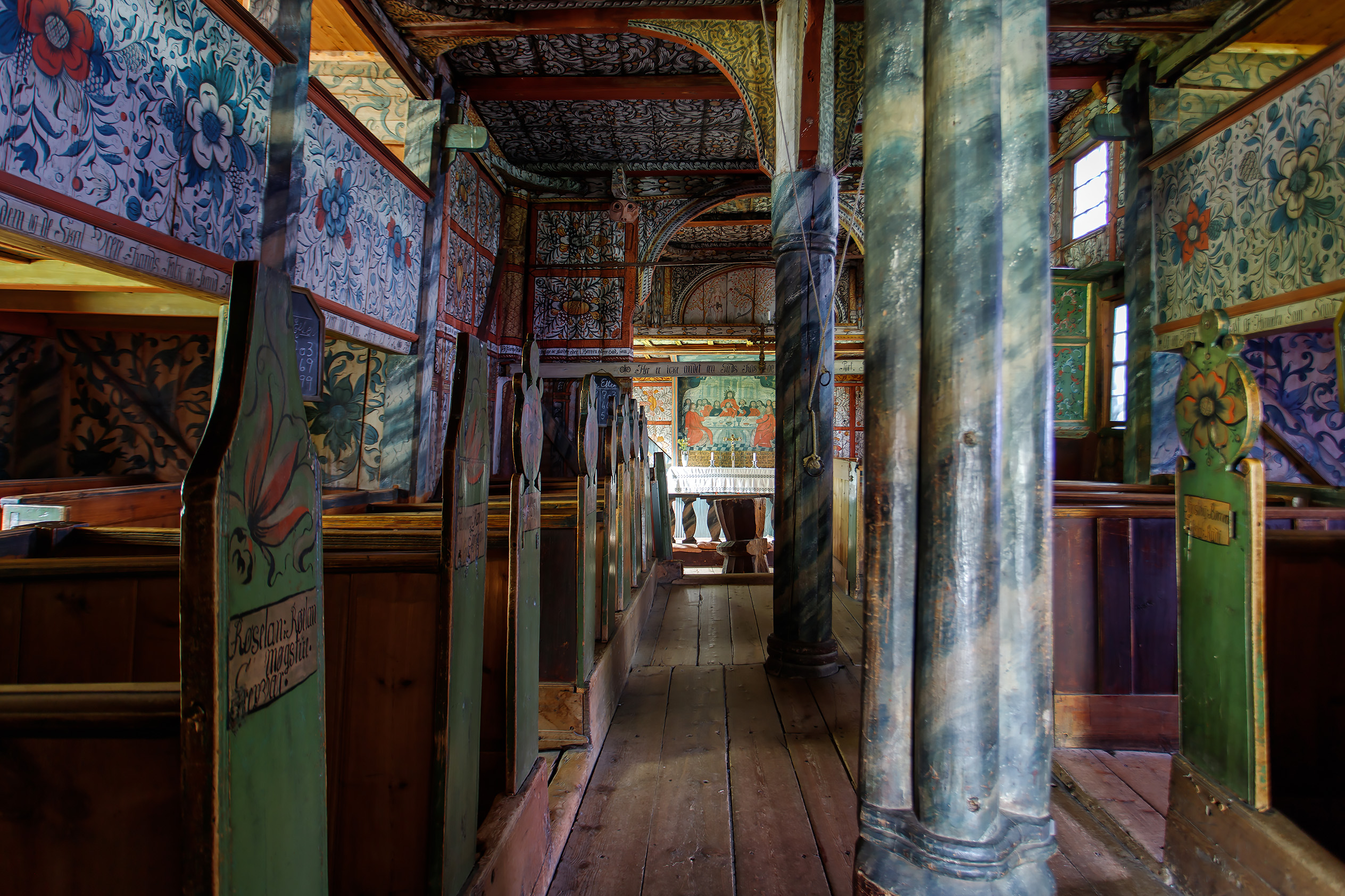
Uvdal Church interior

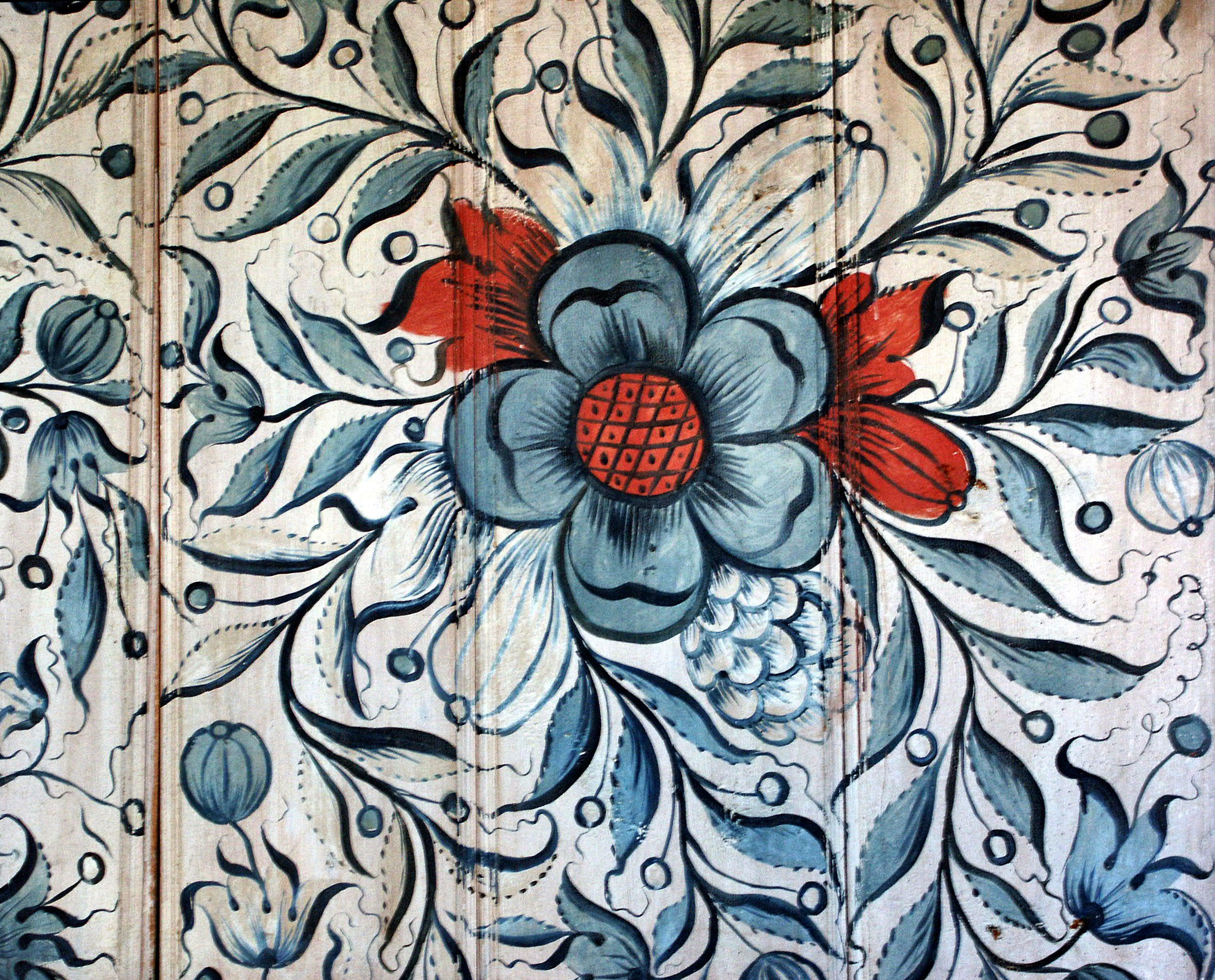
Rosemåling designs

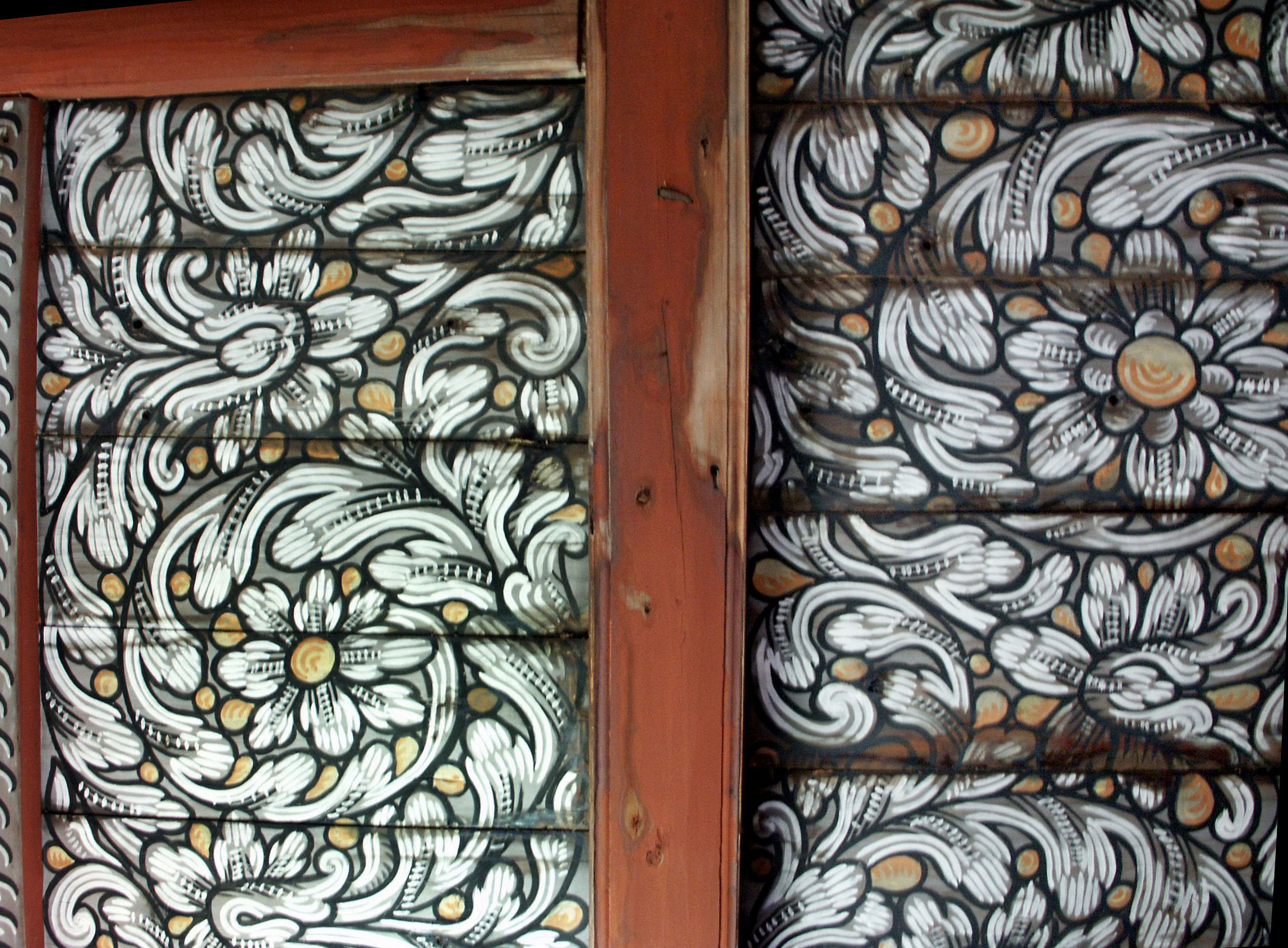
Rosemåling designs

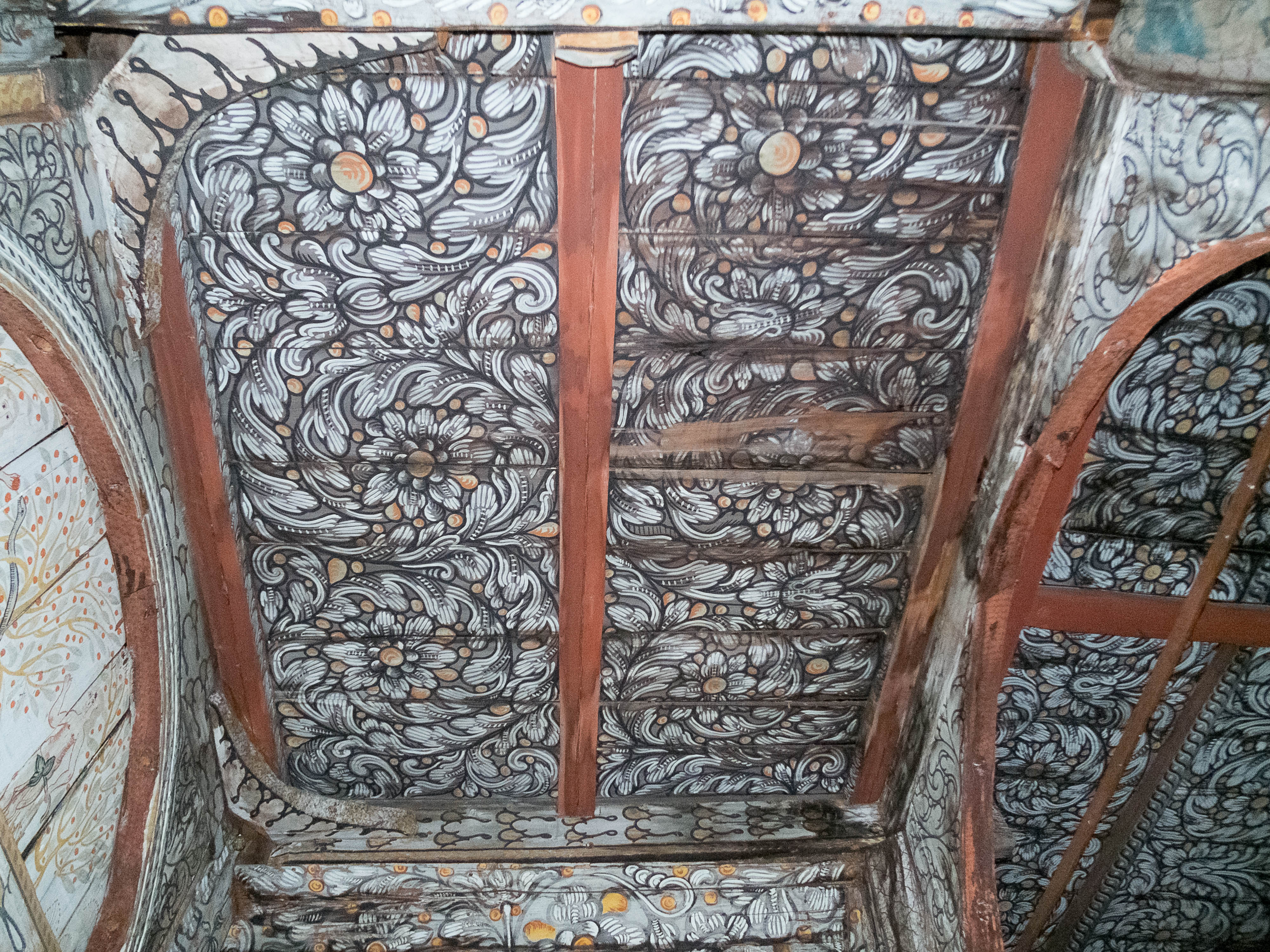
Painted Ceiling of the Nave in Uvdal Stave Church

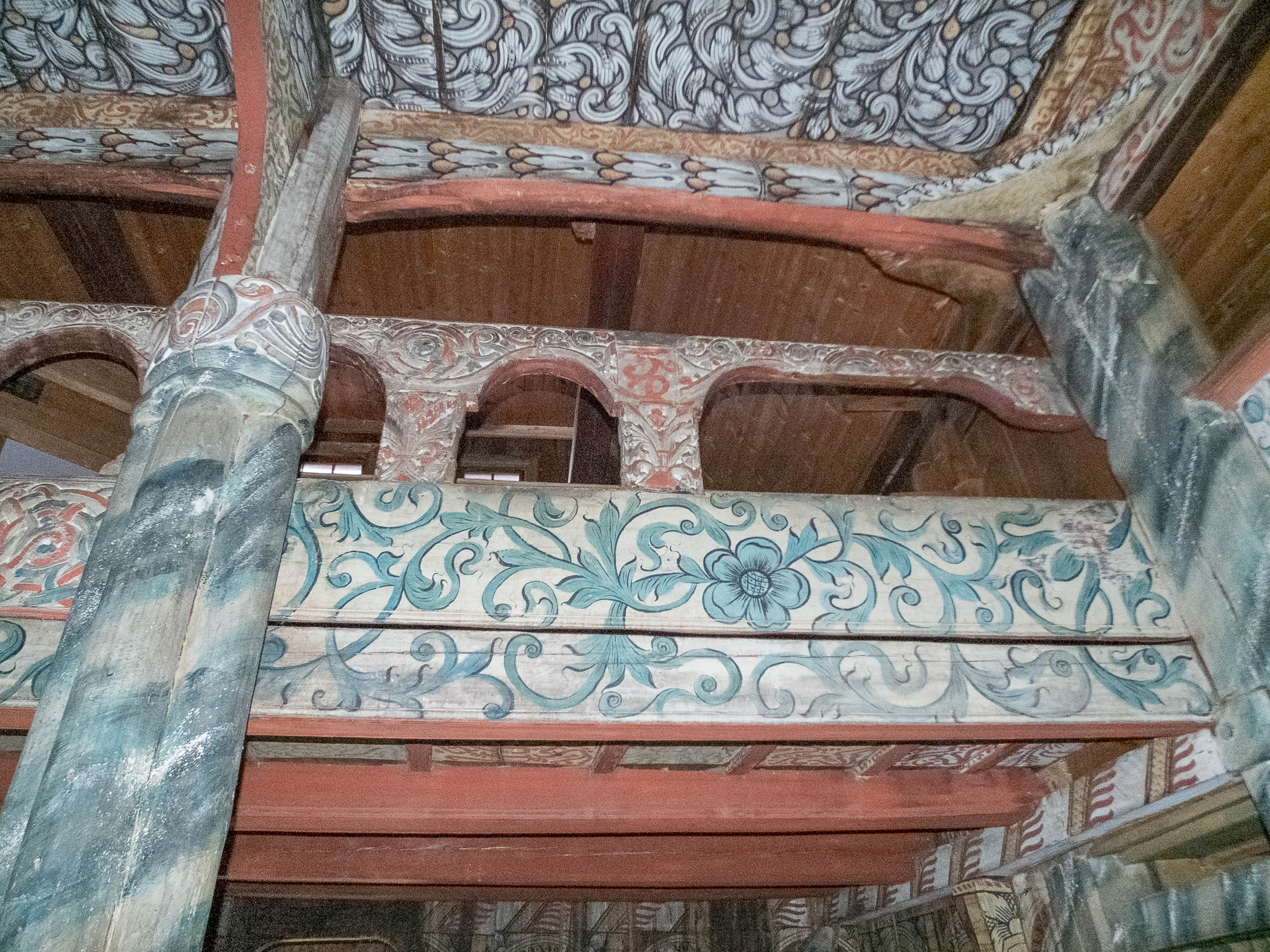
Upper Gallery of Uvdal Stave Church

== See also ==
- List of churches in Tunsberg
