= Society for the Preservation of Ancient Norwegian Monuments =

Association to preserve buildings and other forms of cultural heritage in Norway

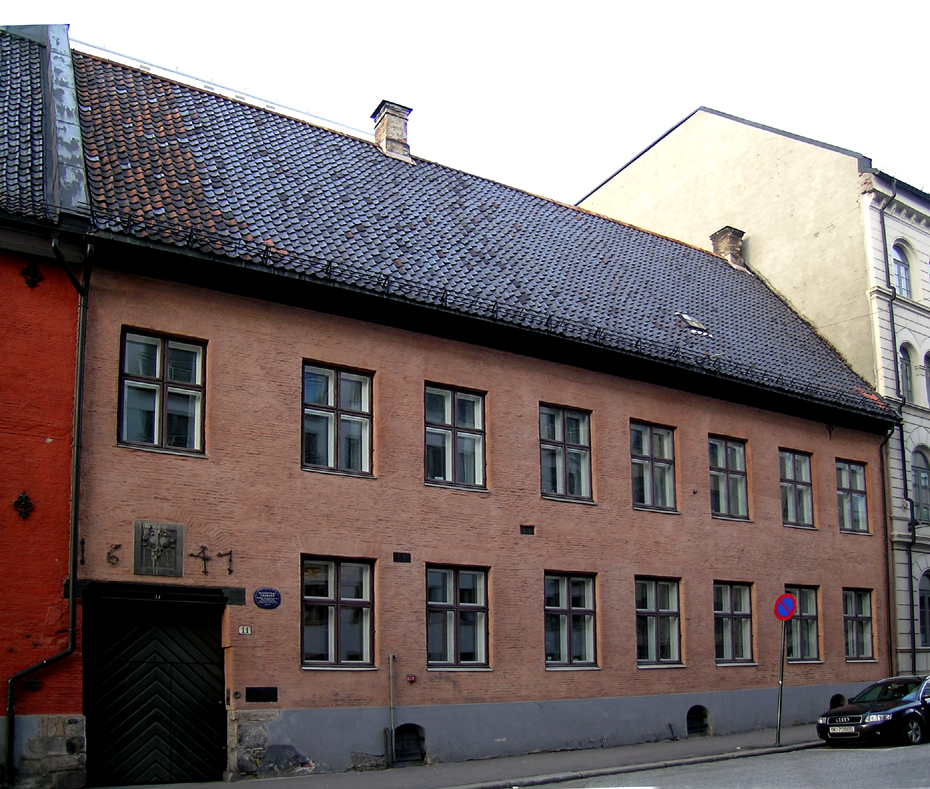
Fortidsminneforeningen Headquarters located in Dronningens gate 11 in Oslo

Society for the Preservation of Ancient Norwegian Monuments (Norwegian: Fortidsminneforeningen) is an organization focused on conservation preservation in Norway.

The Society was founded in 1844. The founders were painters, historians, art historians and archeologists, including J. C. Dahl and Joachim Frich. Nicolay Nicolaysen became chairman in 1851 and from 1860 was the association antiquarian.

The purpose of the association is to protect and preserve buildings, churches and other forms of cultural heritage. It owns forty structures directly, including the stave churches at Borgund, Urnes, Hopperstad and Uvdal. The Society has 18 county branches and 37 local branches in the counties. The branch structure resembles the county structure of Norway, except that Oslo and Akershus are together, Møre and Romsdal is split into Sunnmøre, Nordmøre and Romsdal, and the town of Røros is a division of its own.

== See also ==
- Norwegian Directorate for Cultural Heritage

== Other sources ==
- Eriksen, Anne (2014) From Antiquities to Heritage: Transformations of Cultural Memory (New York, Oxford: Berghahn Books) ISBN 9781782382997
