= Kjelkehøene =

Mountain in Lesja, Norway

- Kjelkehøin
- Interactive map of the mountain

Highest point
- Elevation: 1,605 m (5,266 ft)
- Prominence: 6 m (20 ft)
- Parent peak: Gråhø
- Isolation: 0.283 km (0.176 mi)
- Coordinates: 62°08′06″N 8°07′00″E

Geography
- Location: Innlandet, Norway
- Parent range: Reinheimen

Kjelkehøene is a mountain in Lesja Municipality in Innlandet county, Norway. The 1,605-metre (5,266 ft) tall mountain lies within Reinheimen National Park, about 17 kilometres (11 mi) southwest of the village of Lesjaskog. It is the 792nd highest mountain in the country of mountains with primary factor of at least 50 meters.

Kjelkehøene consists of two peaks, North and South Kjelkehøene. The higher of the two is South Kjelkehøene at 1,692 metres (5,551 ft), while North Kjelkehøene has a height of 1,654 metres (5,427 ft) above sea level.

The mountain is surrounded by several other mountains including Digerkampen which is about 2.3 kilometres (1.4 mi) to the west, Skarvehøi which is about 3 kilometres (1.9 mi) to the northeast, Digervarden which is about 12 kilometres (7.5 mi) to the east-southeast, Grønhøe and Buakollen which are about 9 kilometres (5.6 mi) to the southeast, Holhøe which is about 3 kilometres (1.9 mi) to the south, and Løyfthøene and Gråhø which are about 7 kilometres (4.3 mi) to the southwest.
