= Skarvehøe =

Mountain in Lesja, Norway

- Skarvehøi / Skarvehøa
- Interactive map of the mountain

Highest point
- Elevation: 1,599 m (5,246 ft)
- Prominence: 103 m (338 ft)
- Parent peak: Gråhø
- Isolation: 3.5 km (2.2 mi)
- Coordinates: 62°09′28″N 8°09′48″E

Geography
- Location: Innlandet, Norway
- Parent range: Reinheimen

Skarvehøe is a mountain in Lesja Municipality in Innlandet county, Norway. The 1,599-metre (5,246 ft) tall mountain lies within Reinheimen National Park, about 14 kilometres (8.7 mi) southwest of the village of Lesjaskog. The mountain is surrounded by several other mountains including Storhøa which is about 10 kilometres (6.2 mi) to the northwest, Digerkampen which is about 5.5 kilometres (3.4 mi) to the west, Kjelkehøene which is about 3 kilometres (1.9 mi) to the west, Digervarden which is 10 kilometres (6.2 mi) to the southeast, Grønhøi and Buakollen which are about 9 kilometres (5.6 mi) to the south, Holhøe which is about 5.5 kilometres (3.4 mi) to the southwest, and Løyfthøene and Gråhø which are about 9 kilometres (5.6 mi) to the southwest.

== See also ==
- List of mountains of Norway
