= Leirungshøe =

Mountain in Innlandet, Norway

- Leirungshøi / Leirungshøa
- Interactive map of the mountain

Highest point
- Elevation: 1,825 m (5,988 ft)
- Prominence: 120 m (390 ft)
- Parent peak: Horrungen
- Isolation: 2.2 km (1.4 mi)
- Coordinates: 61°56′48″N 8°28′51″E

Geography
- Location: Innlandet, Norway

Leirungshøe is a mountain in Lom Municipality in Innlandet county, Norway. The 1,825-metre (5,988 ft) tall mountain is located inside the Reinheimen National Park, about 13 kilometres (8.1 mi) northwest of the village of Fossbergom and about 13 kilometres (8.1 mi) northeast of the village of Bismo. The mountain is surrounded by several other notable mountains including Finndalshorungen to the south; Horrungen to the southwest; Ryggehøe, Skardtind, Rundkollan, and Storbrettingskollen to the northeast; and Gjerdinghøe and Lauvknubben to the east.

== See also ==
- List of mountains of Norway
