= Finndalshorungen =

Mountain in Innlandet, Norway

- Interactive map of the mountain

Highest point
- Elevation: 1,815 m (5,955 ft)
- Prominence: 101 m (331 ft)
- Parent peak: Leirungshøi
- Isolation: 1.3 km (0.81 mi)
- Coordinates: 61°56′13″N 8°29′51″E

Geography
- Location: Innlandet, Norway

Finndalshorungen is a mountain in Lom Municipality in Innlandet county, Norway. The 1,815-metre (5,955 ft) tall mountain is located inside the Reinheimen National Park, about 11 kilometres (6.8 mi) northwest of the village of Fossbergom and about 14 kilometres (8.7 mi) northeast of the village of Bismo. The mountain is surrounded by several other notable mountains including Horrungen to the west; Leirungshøe to the north; Ryggehøe, Skardtind, Rundkollan, and Storbrettingskollen to the northeast; and Gjerdinghøe and Lauvknubben to the east.

== See also ==
- List of mountains of Norway
