= Blåhøe, Skjåk =

Mountain in Skjåk, Norway

Blåhøe
- Interactive map of the mountain

Highest point
- Elevation: 1,959 m (6,427 ft)
- Prominence: 140 m (460 ft)
- Parent peak: Gråhø
- Isolation: 3.6 km (2.2 mi) to Gråhø
- Coordinates: 62°05′06″N 8°02′09″E

Geography
- Location: Innlandet, Norway
- Parent range: Tafjordfjella

Blåhøe is a mountain in Skjåk Municipality in Innlandet county, Norway. The 1,959-metre (6,427 ft) tall mountain is located in the Tafjordfjella mountains and inside the Reinheimen National Park, about 25 kilometres (16 mi) northwest of the village of Bismo and about 22 kilometres (14 mi) northeast of the village of Grotli. The mountain is surrounded by several other notable mountains including Dørkampen and Høggøymen to the northwest, Digerkampen to the north, Holhøe to the northeast, Gråhø to the east, Skarvedalseggen and Nørdre Svarthaugen to the southeast, and Stamåhjulet to the south.

On the top of the mountain located the Jettasenderen transmitter that is fed from the Tronsenderen in Alvdal Municipality. It transmits telecommunications, as well as TV and radio signals, both digital and analogue, directly or via converters to approximately 35,000 inhabitants and approximately 40,000 cabins in the nearby municipalities of Skjåk, Lom, Vågå, Lesja, Dovre, Sel, Nord-Fron, Sør-Fron, Ringebu, and parts of Øyer.

== See also ==
- List of mountains of Norway
