= Løyfthøene =

Mountain in Lesja, Norway

- Løyfthøin
- Interactive map of the mountain

Highest point
- Elevation: 1,946 m (6,385 ft)
- Prominence: 86 m (282 ft)
- Parent peak: Gråhø
- Isolation: 1.4 km (0.87 mi)
- Coordinates: 62°04′25″N 8°08′29″E

Geography
- Location: Innlandet, Norway
- Parent range: Reinheimen

Løyfthøene is a mountain in Lesja Municipality in Innlandet county, Norway. The 1,946-metre (6,385 ft) tall mountain lies within Reinheimen National Park, about 20 kilometres (12 mi) southwest of the village of Lesjaskog. The mountain is surrounded by several other mountains including Digerkampen and Kjelkehøene which are about 7 kilometres (4.3 mi) to the northwest, Holhøe which is about 3.5 kilometres (2.2 mi) to the north, Skarvehøi which is about 8 kilometres (5.0 mi) to the northeast, Digervarden and Mehøe which are 12 kilometres (7.5 mi) to the northeast, Grønhøe and Buakollen which are about 5 kilometres (3.1 mi) to the east, Skarvedalseggen which is about 4 kilometres (2.5 mi) to the southwest, and Gråhø which is about 3.5 kilometres (2.2 mi) to the west.

== See also ==
- List of mountains of Norway
