= Dørkampen =

Mountain in Skjåk, Norway

- Interactive map of the mountain

Highest point
- Elevation: 1,820 m (5,970 ft)
- Prominence: 106 m (348 ft)
- Parent peak: Gråhø
- Isolation: 1.7 km (1.1 mi)
- Coordinates: 62°06′08″N 7°59′04″E

Geography
- Location: Innlandet, Norway
- Parent range: Tafjordfjella

Dørkampen is a mountain in Skjåk Municipality in Innlandet county, Norway. The 1,820-metre (5,970 ft) tall mountain is located in the Tafjordfjella mountains and inside the Reinheimen National Park, about 30 kilometres (19 mi) northwest of the village of Bismo and about 20 kilometres (12 mi) northeast of the village of Grotli. The mountain is surrounded by several other notable mountains including Høggøymen to the west, Sponghøi to the north, Digerkampen to the northeast, Holhøe to the east, Blåhøe to the southeast, and Stamåhjulet to the south.

== See also ==
- List of mountains of Norway
