= Nørdre Svarthaugen =

Mountain in Skjåk, Norway

- Interactive map of the mountain

Highest point
- Elevation: 1,762 m (5,781 ft)
- Prominence: 72 m (236 ft)
- Isolation: 2 km (1.2 mi)
- Coordinates: 62°01′50″N 8°04′55″E

Geography
- Location: Innlandet, Norway
- Parent range: Tafjordfjella

Nørdre Svarthaugen is a mountain in Skjåk Municipality in Innlandet county, Norway. The 1,762-metre (5,781 ft) tall mountain is located in the Tafjordfjella mountains and inside the Reinheimen National Park, about 19 kilometres (12 mi) northwest of the village of Bismo. The mountain is surrounded by several other notable mountains including Løyfthøene and Buakollen to the northeast, Skarvedalseggen to the north, and Stamåhjulet to the northwest.

== See also ==
- List of mountains of Norway
