= Sponghøi =

Mountain in Skjåk, Norway

- Sponghøe
- Interactive map of the mountain

Highest point
- Elevation: 1,698 m (5,571 ft)
- Prominence: 159 m (522 ft)
- Parent peak: Storhøa
- Isolation: 1.9 km (1.2 mi)
- Coordinates: 62°08′57″N 7°59′09″E

Geography
- Location: Innlandet, Norway
- Parent range: Tafjordfjella

Sponghøi is a mountain in Skjåk Municipality in Innlandet county, Norway. The 1,698-metre (5,571 ft) tall mountain is located in the Tafjordfjella mountains and inside the Reinheimen National Park, about 34 kilometres (21 mi) northwest of the village of Bismo and about 23 kilometres (14 mi) northeast of the village of Grotli. The mountain is surrounded by several other notable mountains including Storhøa to the north, Digerkampen to the southeast, Dørkampen to the southeast, Høggøymen to the southwest, and Benkehøa to the northwest.

== See also ==
- List of mountains of Norway
