= Gjerdinghøe =

Mountain in Innlandet, Norway

- Gjerdinghøi / Gjerdinghøa
- Interactive map of the mountain

Highest point
- Elevation: 1,753 m (5,751 ft)
- Prominence: 156 m (512 ft)
- Parent peak: Skardtind
- Isolation: 3.4 km (2.1 mi)
- Coordinates: 61°57′35″N 8°48′06″E

Geography
- Location: Innlandet, Norway

Gjerdinghøe is a mountain in Lom Municipality in Innlandet county, Norway. The 1,753-metre (5,751 ft) tall mountain is located inside the Reinheimen National Park, about 19 kilometres (12 mi) northwest of the village of Vågåmo and about 21 kilometres (13 mi) southwest of the village of Dombås. The mountain is surrounded by several other notable mountains including Kjølen, Søre Kjølhaugen, and Knatthøin to the north; Ryggehøe, Skardtind, Rundkollan, and Storbrettingskollen to the northwest; and Lauvknubben to the west.

== See also ==
- List of mountains of Norway
