= Skarvedalseggen =

Mountain in Lesja, Norway

- Skarvedalseggje
- Interactive map of the mountain

Highest point
- Elevation: 1,960 m (6,430 ft)
- Prominence: 324 m (1,063 ft)
- Parent peak: Gråhø
- Isolation: 2.5 km (1.6 mi)
- Coordinates: 62°02′54″N 8°04′52″E

Geography
- Location: Innlandet, Norway
- Parent range: Reinheimen

Skarvedalseggen is a mountain in Innlandet county, Norway. The mountain peak lies along the border of Lesja Municipality and Skjåk Municipality. The 1,960-metre (6,430 ft) tall mountain lies within Reinheimen National Park, about 25 kilometres (16 mi) southwest of the village of Lesjaskog. The mountain is surrounded by several other mountains including Gråhø and Blåhøe which are about 3 kilometres (1.9 mi) to the north, Holhøe which is about 6 kilometres (3.7 mi) to the northeast, Løyfthøene which is about 4 kilometres (2.5 mi) to the northeast, Buakollen which is about 8 kilometres (5.0 mi) to the east, Nordre Svarthaugen which is about 2 kilometres (1.2 mi) to the south, and Stamåhjulet which is about 3 kilometres (1.9 mi) to the west.

== See also ==
- List of mountains of Norway
