= Vulueggi =

Mountain in Norway

- Vulueggje
- Interactive map of the mountain

Highest point
- Elevation: 1,771 m (5,810 ft)
- Prominence: 340 m (1,120 ft)
- Isolation: 4.9 km (3.0 mi)
- Coordinates: 62°05′58″N 7°41′15″E

Geography
- Location: Innlandet, Norway
- Parent range: Tafjordfjella

Vulueggi is a mountain ridge in Skjåk Municipality in Innlandet county, Norway. The 1,771-metre (5,810 ft) tall mountain is located in the Tafjordfjella mountains and inside the Reinheimen National Park, about 9 kilometres (5.6 mi) northeast of the village of Grotli. The mountain is surrounded by several other notable mountains including Tordsnose to the north, Veltdalseggi and Benkehøa to the northeast, Høggøymen to the east, and Krosshø to the west.

The mountain ridge has a number of peaks, three of which have a prominence of more than 50 metres (160 ft). The highest of these lies approximately in the middle of Vulueggi, and has a height of 1,771 metres (5,810 ft) above sea level. In the north, east of Grønvatnet, there is a peak of 1,760 metres (5,770 ft) and in the south is a third peak reaching 1,730 metres (5,680 ft). The two southernmost of the three peaks form border points for the Reinheimen National Park. A small glacier sits on top of the mountain ridge.

== See also ==
- List of mountains of Norway
