= Veltdalseggi =

Mountain in Skjåk, Norway

- Veltdalseggje
- Interactive map of the mountain

Highest point
- Elevation: 1,752 m (5,748 ft)
- Prominence: 272 m (892 ft)
- Isolation: 4.2 km (2.6 mi) to Karitinden
- Coordinates: 62°08′55″N 7°47′22″E

Geography
- Location: Innlandet, Norway
- Parent range: Tafjordfjella

Veltdalseggi is a mountain in Skjåk Municipality in Innlandet county, Norway. The 1,752-metre (5,748 ft) tall mountain is located in the Tafjordfjella mountains and inside the Reinheimen National Park, about 16 kilometres (9.9 mi) northeast of the village of Grotli. The mountain is surrounded by several other notable mountains including Sponghøi to the east, Høggøymen and Dørkampen to the southeast, Vulueggi to the southwest, Tordsnose to the west, and Karitinden to the north.

== See also ==
- List of mountains of Norway
