= Tordsnose =

Mountain in Central Norway

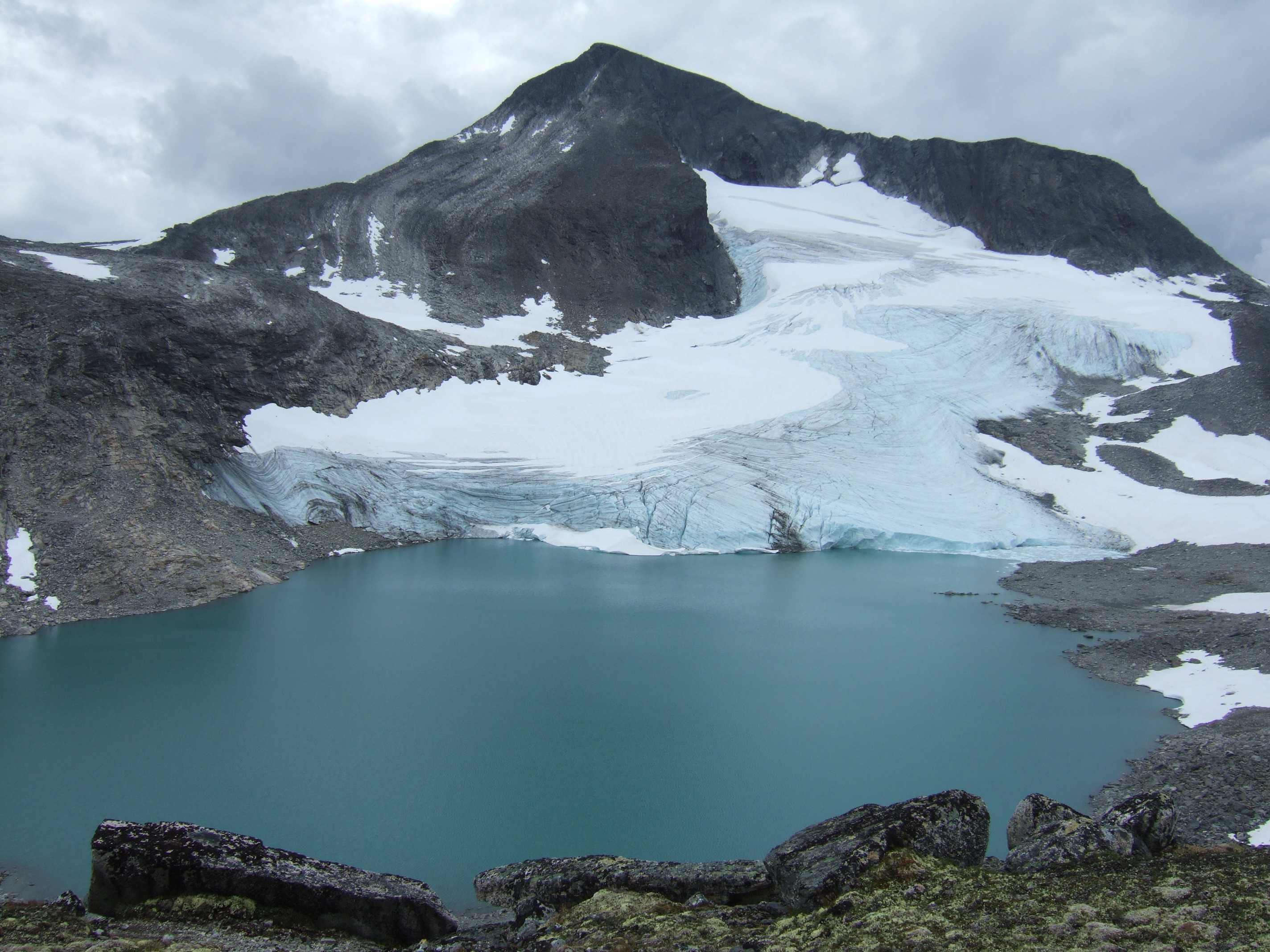

Highest point
- Elevation: 1,975 m (6,480 ft)
- Prominence: 694 m (2,277 ft)
- Parent peak: Gråhø
- Isolation: 6.4 km (4.0 mi) to Karitinden
- Coordinates: 62°08′27″N 7°39′20″E

Geography
- Interactive map of the mountain
- Location: Møre og Romsdal/Innlandet, Norway
- Parent range: Tafjordfjella
- Topo map: 1319 III Tafjord

Tordsnose is a mountain in Norway. The 1,975-metre (6,480 ft) tall mountain lies on the border of Fjord Municipality (in Møre og Romsdal county) and Skjåk Municipality (in Innlandet county). It sits in the Tafjordfjella mountain range and within Reinheimen National Park, about 6 kilometres (3.7 mi) southwest of Karitinden and 8.5 kilometres (5.3 mi) south of Puttegga. The lake Grønvatnet sits 3 kilometres (1.9 mi) south of the mountain and the lake Tordsvatnet lies 8 kilometres (5.0 mi) straight east of the mountain. Other mountains surrounding it include Veltdalseggi to the east and Vulueggi and Krosshø to the south.

== See also ==
- List of mountains of Norway
