= Høgstolen =

Mountain in Møre og Romsdal, Norway

- Interactive map of the mountain

Highest point
- Elevation: 1,953 m (6,407 ft)
- Prominence: 202 m (663 ft)
- Parent peak: Karitinden
- Isolation: 1.8 km (1.1 mi)
- Coordinates: 62.1993°N 7.6838°E

Geography
- Location: Møre og Romsdal, Norway
- Parent range: Tafjordfjella
- Topo map: 1319 III Tafjord

Høgstolen is a mountain in Møre og Romsdal county, Norway. The 1,953-metre (6,407 ft) tall mountain lies on the border of Rauma Municipality and Fjord Municipality in the Tafjordfjella mountain range, about 3 kilometres (1.9 mi) west of the border with Innlandet county.

Høgstolen lies within the Reinheimen National Park, between the mountains Puttegga and Karitinden. The name is not unique to this mountain, as there are other (lower) mountains with the same name in Norway.

== See also ==
- List of mountains of Norway
