= Lauvknubben =

Mountain in Innlandet, Norway

Lauvknubben Skårvangen
- Interactive map of the mountain

Highest point
- Elevation: 1,748 m (5,735 ft)
- Prominence: 67 m (220 ft)
- Parent peak: Gjerdinghøi
- Isolation: 1.8 km (1.1 mi)
- Coordinates: 61°57′52″N 8°46′03″E

Geography
- Location: Innlandet, Norway

Lauvknubben or Skårvangen is a mountain in Lom Municipality in Innlandet county, Norway. The 1,748-metre (5,735 ft) tall mountain is located inside the Reinheimen National Park, about 19 kilometres (12 mi) northwest of the village of Vågåmo and about 17 kilometres (11 mi) northeast of the village of Fossbergom. The mountain is surrounded by several other notable mountains including Kjølen, Søre Kjølhaugen, and Knatthøin to the north; Ryggehøe, Skardtind, Rundkollan, and Storbrettingskollen to the northwest; and Gjerdinghøe to the east.

== See also ==
- List of mountains of Norway
