= Høggøymen =

Mountain in Skjåk, Norway

- Interactive map of the mountain

Highest point
- Elevation: 1,741 m (5,712 ft)
- Prominence: 193 m (633 ft)
- Parent peak: Gråhø
- Isolation: 2.8 km (1.7 mi)
- Coordinates: 62°05′42″N 7°54′54″E

Geography
- Location: Innlandet, Norway
- Parent range: Tafjordfjella

Høggøymen is a mountain in Skjåk Municipality in Innlandet county, Norway. The 1,741-metre (5,712 ft) tall mountain is located in the Tafjordfjella mountains and inside the Reinheimen National Park, about 30 kilometres (19 mi) northwest of the village of Bismo and about 15 kilometres (9.3 mi) northeast of the village of Grotli. The mountain is surrounded by several other notable mountains including Vulueggi to the west, Benkehøa to the north, Sponghøi and Storhøa to the northeast, Dørkampen and Blåhøe to the east, and Stamåhjulet to the southeast.

== See also ==
- List of mountains of Norway
