= Storbrettingskollen =

Mountain in Innlandet, Norway

- Interactive map of the mountain

Highest point
- Elevation: 1,851 m (6,073 ft)
- Prominence: 140 m (460 ft)
- Parent peak: Rundkollan
- Isolation: 4.5 km (2.8 mi)
- Coordinates: 61°59′28″N 8°44′43″E

Geography
- Location: Innlandet, Norway

Storbrettingskollen is a mountain in Lom Municipality in Innlandet county, Norway. The 1,851-metre (6,073 ft) tall mountain is located inside the Reinheimen National Park, about 19 kilometres (12 mi) northeast of the village of Fossbergom and about 24 kilometres (15 mi) northwest of the village of Vågåmo. The mountain is surrounded by several other notable mountains including Ryggehøe, Skardtind, and Rundkollan to the west; Kjølen, Søre Kjølhaugen, and Knatthøin to the north; and Gjerdinghøe and Lauvknubben to the south.

== See also ==
- List of mountains of Norway
