= Benkehøa =

Mountain in Norway

- Interactive map of the mountain

Highest point
- Elevation: 1,945 m (6,381 ft)
- Prominence: 456 m (1,496 ft)
- Isolation: 6.9 km (4.3 mi) to Karitinden
- Coordinates: 62°10′15″N 7°51′51″E

Geography
- Location: Innlandet, Norway
- Parent range: Tafjordfjella

Benkehøa is a mountain on the border of Skjåk Municipality in Innlandet county and Rauma Municipality in Møre og Romsdal county, Norway. The 1,945-metre (6,381 ft) tall mountain is located in the Tafjordfjella mountains and inside the Reinheimen National Park, about 20 kilometres (12 mi) northeast of the village of Grotli. The mountain is surrounded by several other notable mountains including Storhøa to the east, Digerkampen and Dørkampen to the southeast, Høggøymen to the south, Veltdalseggi to the southwest, and Karitinden to the west.

== See also ==
- List of mountains of Norway
