= Trihøin =

Mountain in Innlandet, Norway

- Trihøene / Storhøi
- Interactive map of the mountain

Highest point
- Elevation: 1,729 m (5,673 ft)
- Prominence: 249 m (817 ft)
- Parent peak: Skardtind
- Isolation: 5.4 km (3.4 mi) to Skardtind
- Coordinates: 62°01′01″N 8°28′29″E

Geography
- Location: Innlandet, Norway

Trihøin is a mountain in Innlandet county, Norway. The mountain lies along the border between Skjåk Municipality and Lesja Municipality. The 1,729-metre (5,673 ft) tall mountain lies inside Reinheimen National Park, about 20 kilometres (12 mi) south of the village of Lesjaverk. The mountain is surrounded by several other mountains including Horrungen which lies about 9 kilometres (5.6 mi) to the south, Skardtind which lies about 6 kilometres (3.7 mi) to the east, and Digervarden which is about 12 kilometres (7.5 mi) to the north. The mountain has three main peaks (hence the name) and the tallest peak is also known as Storhøi.

== See also ==
- List of mountains of Norway
