= Stamåhjulet =

Mountain in Skjåk, Norway

- Interactive map of the mountain

Highest point
- Elevation: 1,821 m (5,974 ft)
- Prominence: 115 m (377 ft)
- Parent peak: Skarvedalseggen
- Isolation: 1.4 km (0.87 mi)
- Coordinates: 62°02′28″N 8°01′35″E

Geography
- Location: Innlandet, Norway
- Parent range: Tafjordfjella

Stamåhjulet is a mountain in Skjåk Municipality in Innlandet county, Norway. The 1,821-metre (5,974 ft) tall mountain is located in the Tafjordfjella mountains and inside the Reinheimen National Park, about 22 kilometres (14 mi) northwest of the village of Bismo. The mountain is surrounded by several other notable mountains including Nørdre Svarthaugen to the southeast, Skarvedalseggen to the east, Blåhøe and Gråhø to the northeast, and Dørkampen and Høggøymen to the northwest.

== See also ==
- List of mountains of Norway
