= Storhøe =

Storhøe (or its alternate spellings Storhø, Storhøi or Storhøa) may refer to:

== People ==
- Dennis Storhøi (born 1960), a Norwegian actor

== Places ==
- Storhøa (Rauma), a mountain in Rauma municipality in Møre og Romsdal county, Norway
- Storhøe (Fokstugu, Dovre), a mountain in Dovre municipality in Innlandet county, Norway
- Storhøi (Lom), a mountain in Lom municipality in Innlandet county, Norway
- Storhøi (Lesja), a mountain in Lesja municipality in Innlandet county, Norway
