= Tafjord =

Village in Fjord Municipality, Norway

- Village
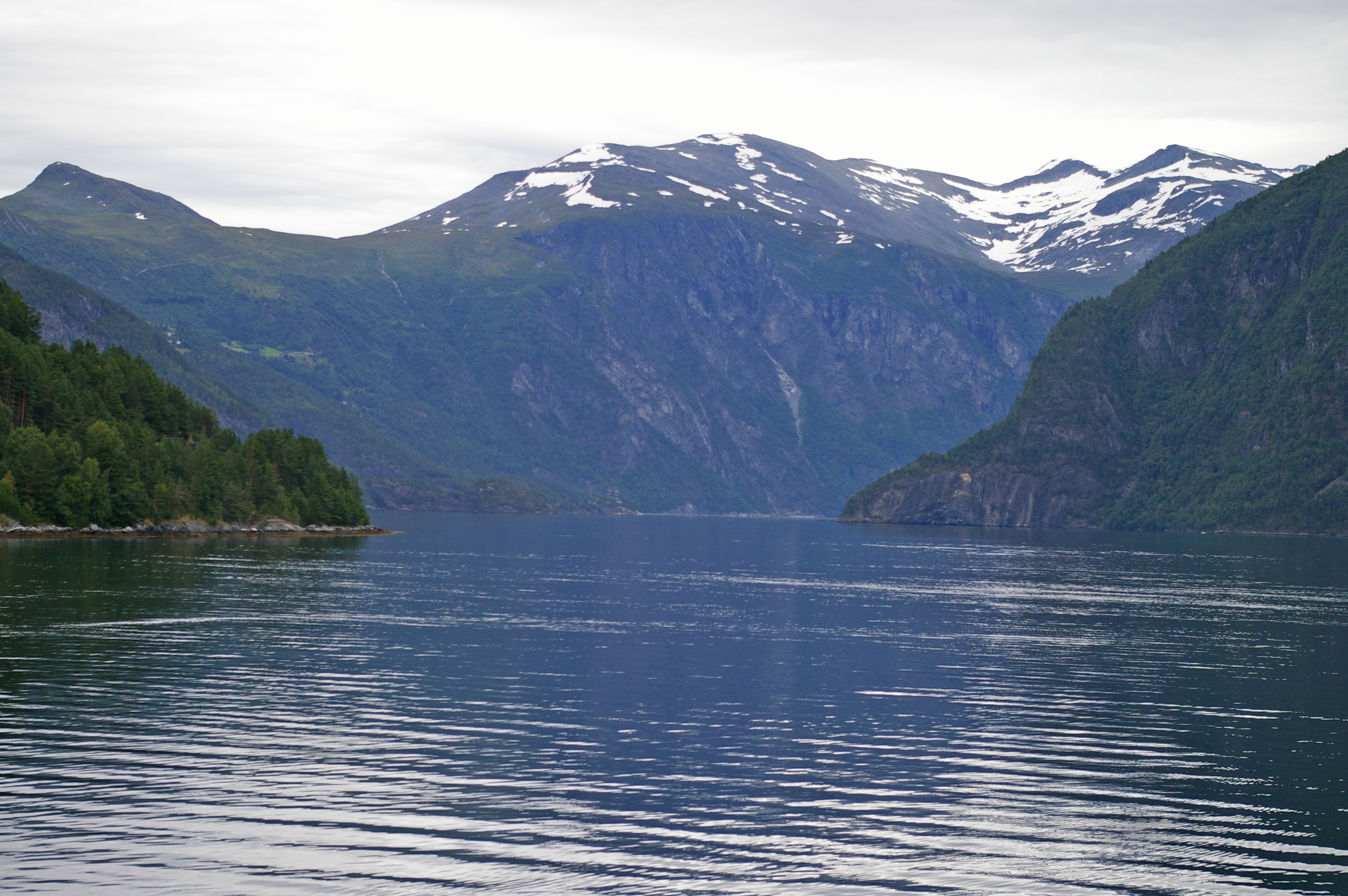
- Towards Tafjord from Norddalsfjord
- Interactive map of Tafjord
- Location within Møre og Romsdal Location within Norway
- Coordinates: 62.2324°N 7.4177°E
- Country: Norway
- Region: Western Norway
- County: Møre og Romsdal
- District: Sunnmøre
- Municipality: Fjord Municipality
- Elevation: 6 m (20 ft)
- Time zone: UTC+01:00 (CET)
  - Summer (DST): UTC+02:00 (CEST)
- Post Code: 6213 Tafjord

Tafjord is a village in Fjord Municipality in Møre og Romsdal county, Norway. The village is very isolated and (other than by boat) the only way into the valley is by road from the village of Sylte. The road is composed almost entirely of two tunnels through the very steep mountains along the edge of the Tafjorden: the 5.3-kilometre (3.3 mi) Heggur Tunnel and the 700-metre (2,300 ft) long Skjegghammar Tunnel.

== Geography ==
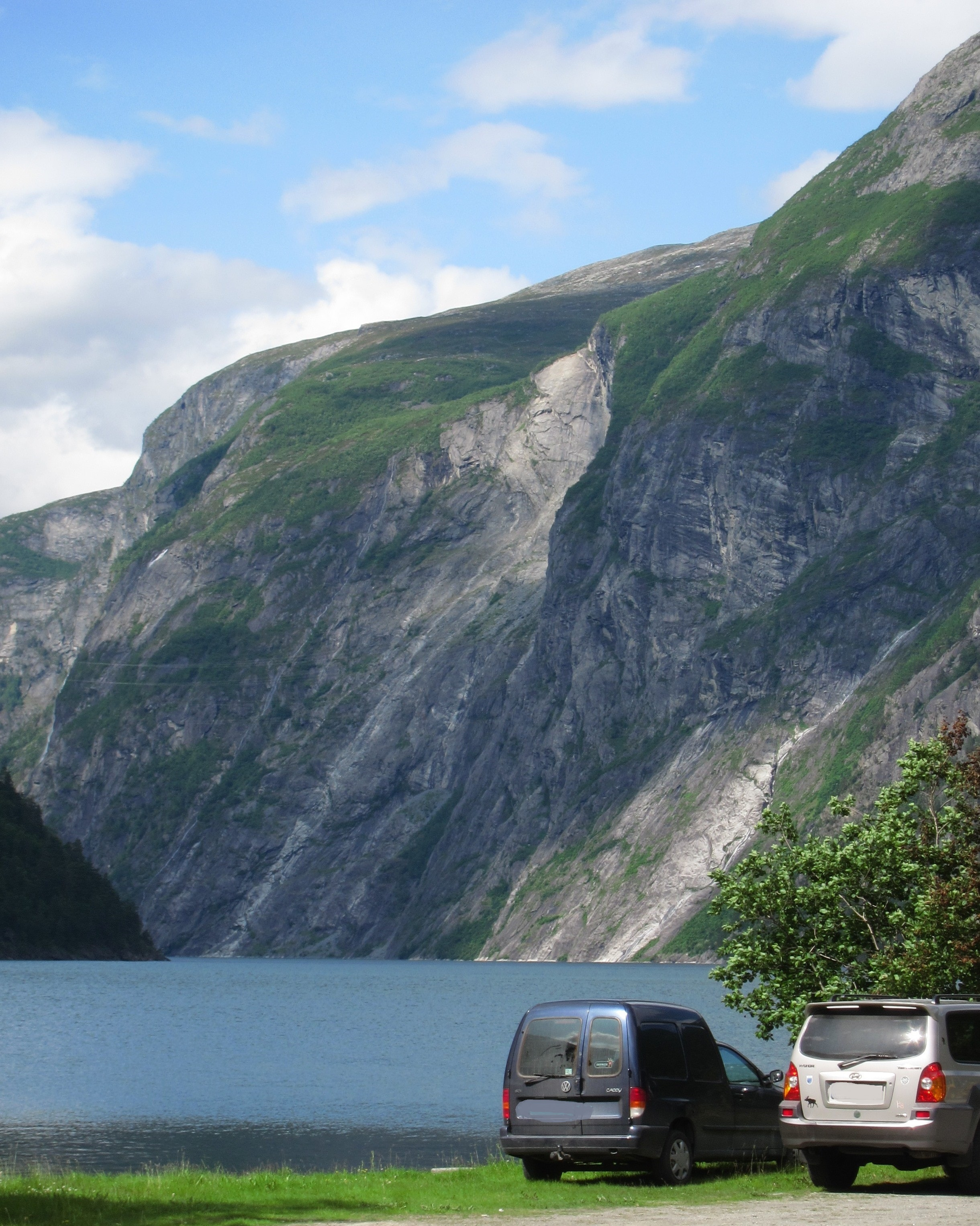
Landslide scar still visible, seen from Tafjord village

The village is in a valley located at the end of the Tafjorden, about 12 kilometres (7.5 mi) southeast of the village of Sylte, and just west of the borders of Reinheimen National Park. In the park, the mountains Tordsnose, Karitinden, and Puttegga all lie about 15 kilometres (9.3 mi) to the southeast of Tafjord in the Tafjordfjella mountain range.

=== Tafjord landslide ===
On 7 April 1934, a rockslide of about 2,000,000 cubic metres (2,600,000 yd^{3}) of rock fell off the mountain Langhamaren from a height of about 700 metres (2,300 ft). The rock landed in the Tafjorden which created a local megatsunami which killed 34 people living on the shore of the fjord. The waves reached a height of 62 metres (203 ft) near the landslide, about 7 metres (23 ft) at Sylte, and about 16 metres (52 ft) at Tafjord. It was one of the worst natural disasters in Norway in the 20th century.

== Climate ==
The weather station in Tafjord has been recording since 1925, and holds the record for the highest temperature in Norway in November at 21.8 °C (71.2 °F). The January record 18.7 °C (65.7 °F) was recorded the night before 29 January 2024. These high temperatures in winter and late autumn are primarily due to foehn wind.

Climate data for Tafjord 1991-2020 (11 m, extremes 1930-2024)
Month	Jan	Feb	Mar	Apr	May	Jun	Jul	Aug	Sep	Oct	Nov	Dec	Year
Record high °C (°F)	18.7 (65.7)	17.1 (62.8)	18.1 (64.6)	21.2 (70.2)	28.7 (83.7)	31.8 (89.2)	33.8 (92.8)	30.6 (87.1)	26.5 (79.7)	25.5 (77.9)	21.8 (71.2)	18.7 (65.7)	33.8 (92.8)
Mean daily maximum °C (°F)	5 (41)	4.5 (40.1)	6.7 (44.1)	11.1 (52.0)	15.2 (59.4)	18 (64)	20 (68)	19.3 (66.7)	15.8 (60.4)	11 (52)	7.8 (46.0)	5.4 (41.7)	11.7 (53.0)
Daily mean °C (°F)	1.9 (35.4)	1.4 (34.5)	3.3 (37.9)	6.7 (44.1)	9.9 (49.8)	12.7 (54.9)	15 (59)	14.6 (58.3)	11.7 (53.1)	7.7 (45.9)	4.8 (40.6)	2.2 (36.0)	7.7 (45.8)
Mean daily minimum °C (°F)	−0.6 (30.9)	−1.1 (30.0)	0.4 (32.7)	3.2 (37.8)	6 (43)	9.1 (48.4)	11.7 (53.1)	11.5 (52.7)	8.5 (47.3)	4.8 (40.6)	2.2 (36.0)	−0.4 (31.3)	4.6 (40.3)
Record low °C (°F)	−16.6 (2.1)	−15.4 (4.3)	−14.1 (6.6)	−7 (19)	−2 (28)	0.6 (33.1)	3.5 (38.3)	2.1 (35.8)	−1.6 (29.1)	−7.7 (18.1)	−10.8 (12.6)	−15 (5)	−16.6 (2.1)
Average precipitation mm (inches)	123.2 (4.85)	99.1 (3.90)	94.1 (3.70)	55.7 (2.19)	44 (1.7)	56.2 (2.21)	55.3 (2.18)	66.7 (2.63)	89.9 (3.54)	99 (3.9)	105.2 (4.14)	123.1 (4.85)	1,011.5 (39.79)
Average precipitation days (≥ 1.0 mm)	13	12	12	9	9	10	11	11	12	12	11	14	136
Source 1: yr.no/eklima (means, precipitation, extremes - data by met.no)
Source 2: NOAA - WMO averages 91-2020 Norway
