= Tordsvatnet =

Lake in Skjåk, Norway

- Interactive map of the lake
- Location: Skjåk Municipality, Innlandet
- Coordinates: 62.15041°N 7.82364°E
- Basin countries: Norway
- Max. length: 7 kilometres (4.3 mi)
- Max. width: 1.5 kilometres (0.93 mi)
- Surface area: 6.32 km^{2} (2.44 sq mi)
- Max. depth: 33 metres (108 ft)
- Shore length^{1}: 20.87 kilometres (12.97 mi)
- Surface elevation: 1,335 metres (4,380 ft)
- References: NVE
- ^{1} Shore length is not a well-defined measure.

Tordsvatnet is a lake in Skjåk Municipality in Innlandet county, Norway. The 6.32-square-kilometre (2.44 sq mi) lake lies within the Tafjordfjella mountain range inside the Reinheimen National Park. The mountain lake lies about 40 kilometres (25 mi) northwest of the village of Bismo. The lake lies in a low area surrounded by the mountains Benkehøa (to the east), Karitinden (to the northwest), and Veltdalseggi (to the west).

== See also ==
- List of lakes in Norway
