= Ryggehøe =

Mountain in Innlandet, Norway

Ryggjehøe
- Ryggehøi (unofficial)
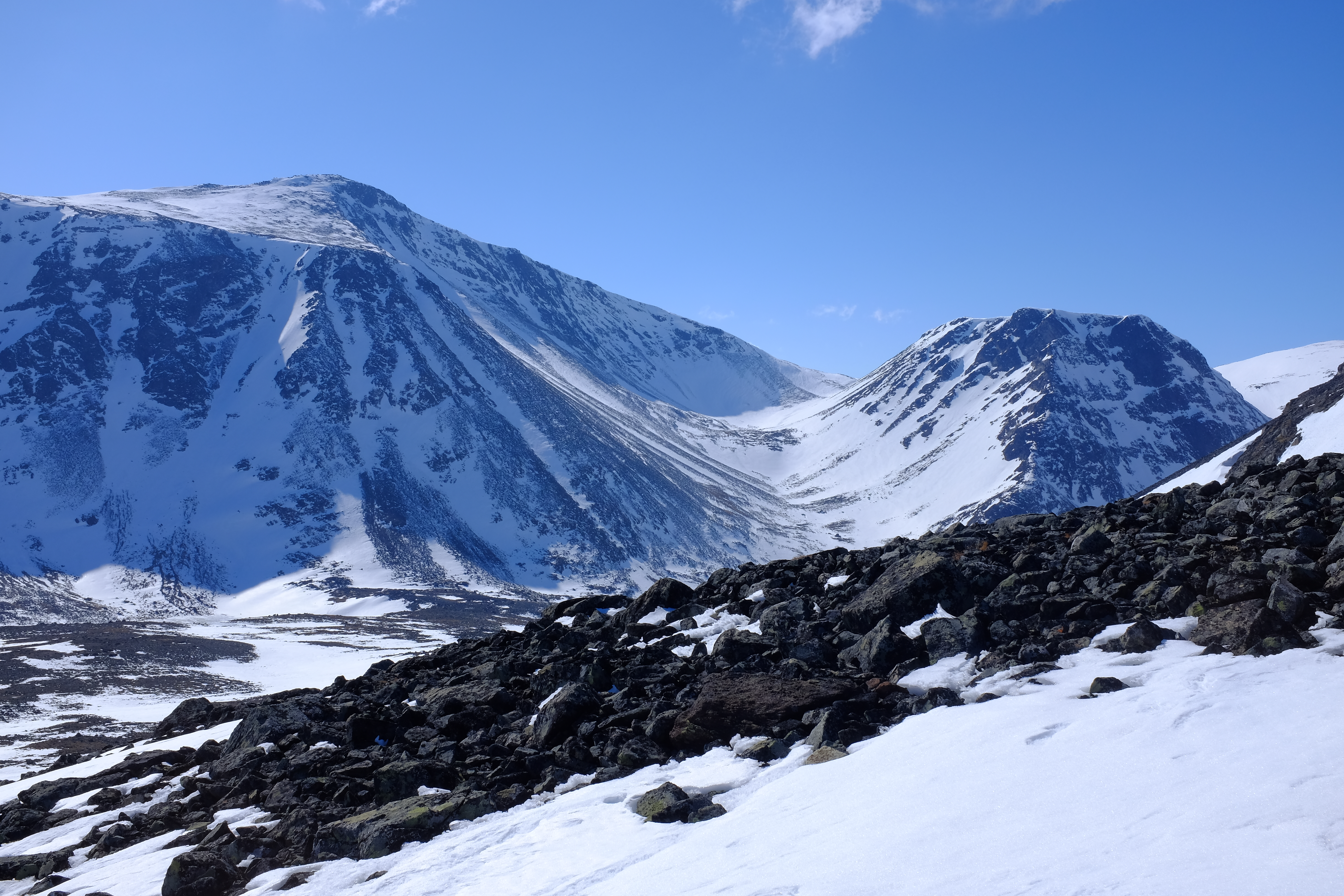

Highest point
- Elevation: 1,730 m (5,680 ft)
- Prominence: 130 m (430 ft)
- Parent peak: Skardtind
- Isolation: 2 km (1.2 mi) to Glittertind
- Coordinates: 61°37′09″N 8°33′37″E

Geography
- Interactive map of the mountain
- Location: Innlandet, Norway

Ryggjehøe is a mountain in Lom Municipality in Innlandet county, Norway. The 1,730-metre (5,680 ft) tall mountain is located inside the Reinheimen National Park, about 16 kilometres (9.9 mi) north of the village of Fossbergom and about 20 kilometres (12 mi) northeast of the village of Bismo. The mountain is surrounded by several other notable mountains including Horrungen, Leirungshøe, and Finndalshorungen to the southwest, Skardtind to the north, Rundkollan and Storbrettingskollen to the east, and Gjerdinghøe and Lauvknubben to the southeast.

== See also ==
- List of mountains of Norway
