= Mehøe =

Mountain in Lesja, Norway

- Mehøi / Mehøa
- Interactive map of the mountain

Highest point
- Elevation: 1,742 m (5,715 ft)
- Prominence: 77 m (253 ft)
- Parent peak: Digervarden
- Isolation: 1.5 km (0.93 mi)
- Coordinates: 62°18′56″N 8°23′11″E

Geography
- Location: Innlandet, Norway
- Parent range: Reinheimen

Mehøe is a mountain in Lesja Municipality in Innlandet county, Norway. The 1,742-metre (5,715 ft) tall mountain lies inside Reinheimen National Park, about 11 kilometres (6.8 mi) southwest of the village of Lesjaverk. The mountain Digervarden lies about 2 kilometres (1.2 mi) southwest and the mountain Grønhøe lies about 7 kilometres (4.3 mi) to the southwest.

== See also ==
- List of mountains of Norway
