= Rundkollan =

Mountain in Innlandet, Norway

- Interactive map of the mountain

Highest point
- Elevation: 1,871 m (6,138 ft)
- Prominence: 191 m (627 ft)
- Parent peak: Skardtind
- Isolation: 3.7 km (2.3 mi)
- Coordinates: 61°59′38″N 8°39′28″E

Geography
- Location: Innlandet, Norway

Rundkollan is a mountain in Lom Municipality in Innlandet county, Norway. The 1,871-metre (6,138 ft) tall mountain is located inside the Reinheimen National Park, about 17 kilometres (11 mi) northeast of the village of Fossbergom and about 26 kilometres (16 mi) northwest of the village of Vågåmo. The mountain is surrounded by several other notable mountains including Horrungen, Finndalshorungen, and Leirungshøe to the southwest, Ryggehøe to the west, Skardtind to the north, Storbrettingskollen to the east; and Gjerdinghøe and Lauvknubben to the southeast.

The mountain actually has three peaks with prominence over 50 metres (160 ft). The middle peak is the highest with an elevation of 1,873 metres (6,145 ft) above sea level. The eastern peak reaches 1,866 metres (6,122 ft) high, and the western peak reaches an elevation of 1,834 metres (6,017 ft).

== See also ==
- List of mountains of Norway
