= Vangshøe =

Mountain in Lesja, Norway

- Vangshøi / Vangshøa
- Interactive map of the mountain

Highest point
- Elevation: 1,658 m (5,440 ft)
- Prominence: 159 m (522 ft)
- Parent peak: Svarthøi
- Isolation: 2.1 km (1.3 mi)
- Coordinates: 62°16′21″N 8°33′02″E

Geography
- Location: Innlandet, Norway
- Parent range: Dovrefjell

Vangshøe is a mountain in Lesja Municipality in Innlandet county, Norway. The 1,658-metre (5,440 ft) tall mountain lies about 9 kilometres (5.6 mi) north of the village of Lesjaverk. The mountain is surrounded by several other mountains including Merratind which is about 2.5 kilometres (1.6 mi) to the west, Svarthøi which is about 12 kilometres (7.5 mi) to the northwest, and Storhøi and Blåhøe which are about 6 kilometres (3.7 mi) to the northwest.

== See also ==
- List of mountains of Norway
