= Grønhøe =

Mountain in Lesja, Norway

- Interactive map of the mountain

Highest point
- Elevation: 1,650 m (5,410 ft)
- Prominence: 92 m (302 ft)
- Parent peak: Digervarden
- Isolation: 2.6 km (1.6 mi)
- Coordinates: 62°04′46″N 8°16′16″E

Geography
- Location: Innlandet, Norway
- Parent range: Reinheimen

Grønhøe is a mountain in Lesja Municipality in Innlandet county, Norway. The 1,650-metre (5,410 ft) tall mountain lies within Reinheimen National Park, about 20 kilometres (12 mi) southwest of the village of Lesjaskog. The mountain is surrounded by several other mountains including Digervarden which is about 5.5 kilometres (3.4 mi) to the northeast, Skarvehøi which is about 9 kilometres (5.6 mi) to the north-northwest, Holhøi which is 8 kilometres (5.0 mi) to the northwest, Løyfthøene and Gråhø which are about 8 kilometres (5.0 mi) to the west, and Buakollen which is about 2.5 kilometres (1.6 mi) to the southwest.

== See also ==
- List of mountains of Norway
