= Blåhøe, Lesja =

Mountain in Lesja, Norway

Blåhøe
- Blåhøi
- Interactive map of the mountain

Highest point
- Elevation: 1,668 m (5,472 ft)
- Prominence: 65 m (213 ft)
- Parent peak: Storhøi
- Isolation: 1.2 km (0.75 mi)
- Coordinates: 62°17′00″N 8°25′58″E

Geography
- Location: Innlandet, Norway
- Parent range: Dovrefjell

Blåhøe is a mountain in Lesja Municipality in Innlandet county, Norway. The 1,668-metre (5,472 ft) tall mountain lies about 1.7 kilometres (1.1 mi) southeast of the larger mountain Storhøi and about 3.9 kilometres (2.4 mi) west of the mountain Merratind. Other surrounding mountains include Svarthøi to the northwest and Vangshøi to the southeast. The village of Lesjaskog and the lake Lesjaskogsvatnet lie about 6 kilometres (3.7 mi) south of the mountain.

== See also ==
- List of mountains of Norway
