= Aursjoen =

Lake in Skjåk, Norway

- Interactive map of the lake
- Location: Skjåk Municipality, Innlandet
- Coordinates: 61.9374°N 8.27425°E
- Primary outflows: Aura river
- Basin countries: Norway
- Max. length: 5.5 kilometres (3.4 mi)
- Max. width: 1.6 kilometres (0.99 mi)
- Surface area: 7.3783 km^{2} (2.8488 sq mi)
- Max. depth: 24.1 metres (79 ft)
- Shore length^{1}: 18.88 kilometres (11.73 mi)
- Surface elevation: 1,098 metres (3,602 ft)
- References: NVE
- ^{1} Shore length is not a well-defined measure.

Aursjoen is a lake in Skjåk Municipality in Innlandet county, Norway. The 7.3783-square-kilometre (2.8488 sq mi) lake sits at an elevation of 1,098 metres (3,602 ft) above sea level. The lake lies about 5 kilometres (3.1 mi) north of the village of Bismo. The mountain Horrungen lies just east of the lake. Reinheimen National Park lies just north of the lake.

== See also ==
- List of lakes in Norway
