= Holhøe =

Mountain in Lesja, Norway

- Holhøi / Holhøa
- Interactive map of the mountain

Highest point
- Elevation: 1,805 m (5,922 ft)
- Prominence: 91 m (299 ft)
- Parent peak: Gråhø
- Isolation: 1.4 km (0.87 mi)
- Coordinates: 62°06′10″N 8°07′05″E

Geography
- Location: Innlandet, Norway
- Parent range: Reinheimen

Holhøe is a mountain in Lesja Municipality in Innlandet county, Norway. The 1,805-metre (5,922 ft) tall mountain lies within Reinheimen National Park, about 20 kilometres (12 mi) southwest of the village of Lesjaskog. The mountain is surrounded by several other mountains including Digerkampen which is about 4 kilometres (2.5 mi) to the northwest, Kjelkehøene which is about 3.5 kilometres (2.2 mi) to the north, Skarvehøi which is about 5.7 kilometres (3.5 mi) to the northeast, Digervarden which is 12 kilometres (7.5 mi) to the east, Grønhøe and Buakollen which are about 7 kilometres (4.3 mi) to the southeast, and Løyfthøene and Gråhø which are about 3.5 kilometres (2.2 mi) to the south.

== See also ==
- List of mountains of Norway
