= Grønvatnet =

Lake in Skjåk, Norway

- Interactive map of the lake
- Location: Skjåk Municipality, Innlandet
- Coordinates: 62.11135°N 7.62256°E
- Basin countries: Norway
- Max. length: 4 kilometres (2.5 mi)
- Max. width: 1.2 kilometres (0.75 mi)
- Surface area: 3.098 km^{2} (1.196 sq mi)
- Shore length^{1}: 10.6 kilometres (6.6 mi)
- Surface elevation: 1,273 metres (4,177 ft)
- References: NVE
- ^{1} Shore length is not a well-defined measure.

Grønvatnet is a lake in Skjåk Municipality in Innlandet county, Norway. The 3-square-kilometre (1.2 sq mi) lake lies within the Tafjordfjella mountain range, about 10 kilometres (6.2 mi) north of the village of Grotli. The mountain lake lies in a low area surrounded by mountains, just west of Vulueggi, north of Krosshø, and south of Tordsnose.

== See also ==
- List of lakes in Norway
