= Lesjaverk Church =

Church in Innlandet, Norway

- Lesjaverk kyrkje
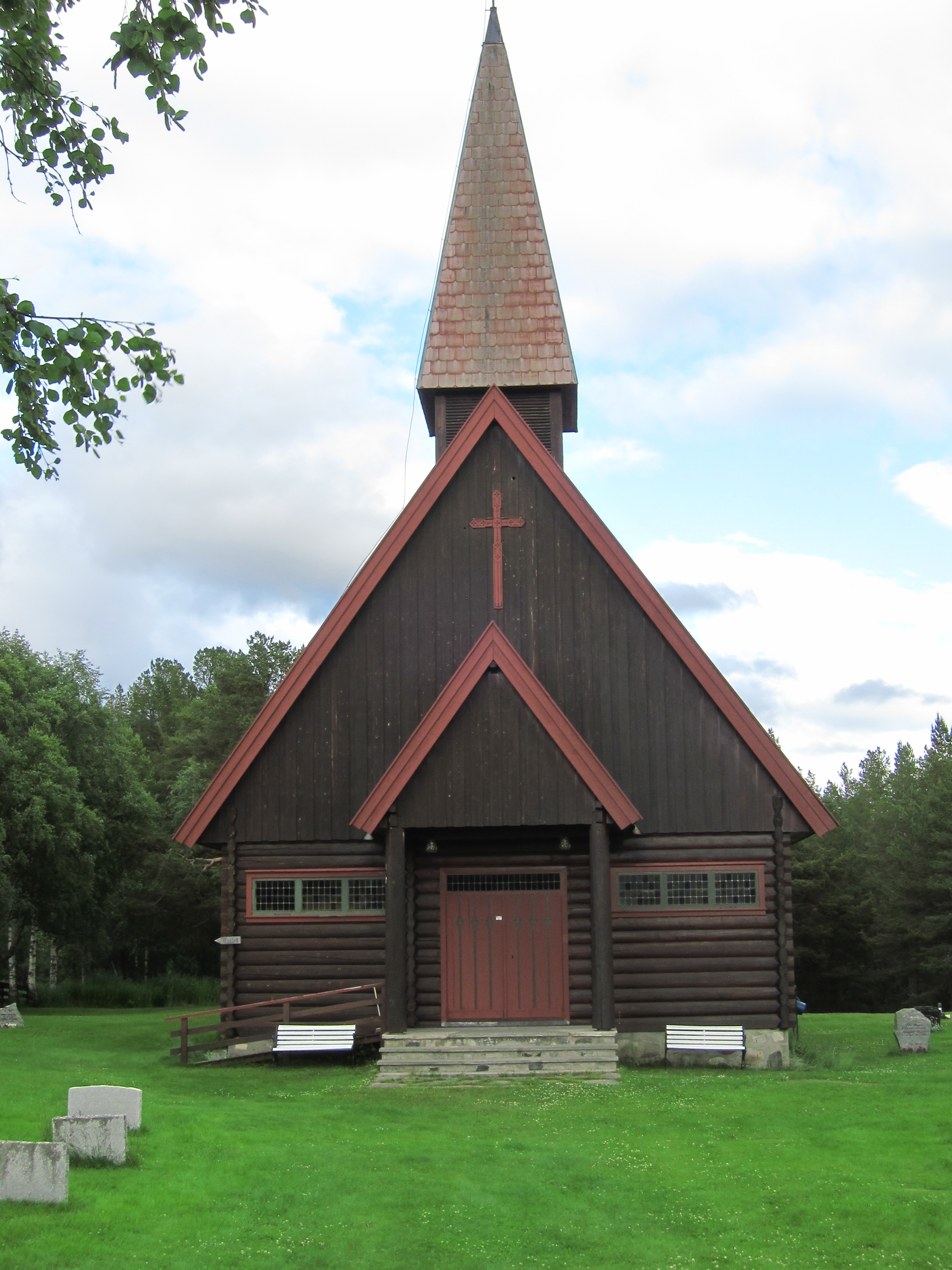
- View of the church
- Lesjaverk Church
- 62°11′20″N 8°33′06″E
- Location: Lesja Municipality, Innlandet
- Country: Norway
- Denomination: Church of Norway
- Churchmanship: Evangelical Lutheran

History
- Status: Parish church
- Founded: 1964
- Consecrated: 19 July 1964

Architecture
- Functional status: Active
- Architect(s): Nissen & Brynning
- Architectural type: Rectangular
- Groundbreaking: 25 June 1962
- Completed: 1964 (62 years ago)

Specifications
- Capacity: 120
- Materials: Wood

Administration
- Diocese: Hamar bispedømme
- Deanery: Nord-Gudbrandsdal prosti
- Parish: Lesja og Lesjaskog
- Norwegian Cultural Heritage Site
- Type: Church
- Status: Not protected
- ID: 84293

Lesjaverk Church (Norwegian: Lesjaverk kyrkje) is a parish church of the Church of Norway in Lesja Municipality in Innlandet county, Norway. It is located in the village of Lesjaverk. It is the church for the Lesja og Lesjaskog parish which is part of the Nord-Gudbrandsdal prosti (deanery) in the Diocese of Hamar. The brown, wooden church was built in a rectangular design in 1964 using plans drawn up by the architectural firm Nissen & Brynning. The church seats about 120 people.

== History ==
The first Lesjaskog Church was actually built in the village of Lesjaverk in 1695 and originally it was also known as Lesjaverk Church. The church served the upper part of the Lesja valley for about 150 years until 1855 when the church was disassembled and moved further up the valley to the village of Lesjaskog. The old church site then sat vacant for quite some time. The old graveyard fell into disrepair and most traces of it eventually disappeared. In 1933, the parish began holding services on the site each year on Constitution Day. The old cemetery was re-consecrated on 29 September 1941. Planning began for a new church on the site, but that took some time. Plans for the new church were designed by the architectural firm Nissen & Brynning and Åsmund Nyrnes was hired as the lead builder for the project. The foundation stone was laid on 25 June 1962. Work carried on from 1962-1964. The new building was consecrated on 19 July 1964 by the newly appointed Bishop Alexander Lange Johnson.

== Media gallery ==
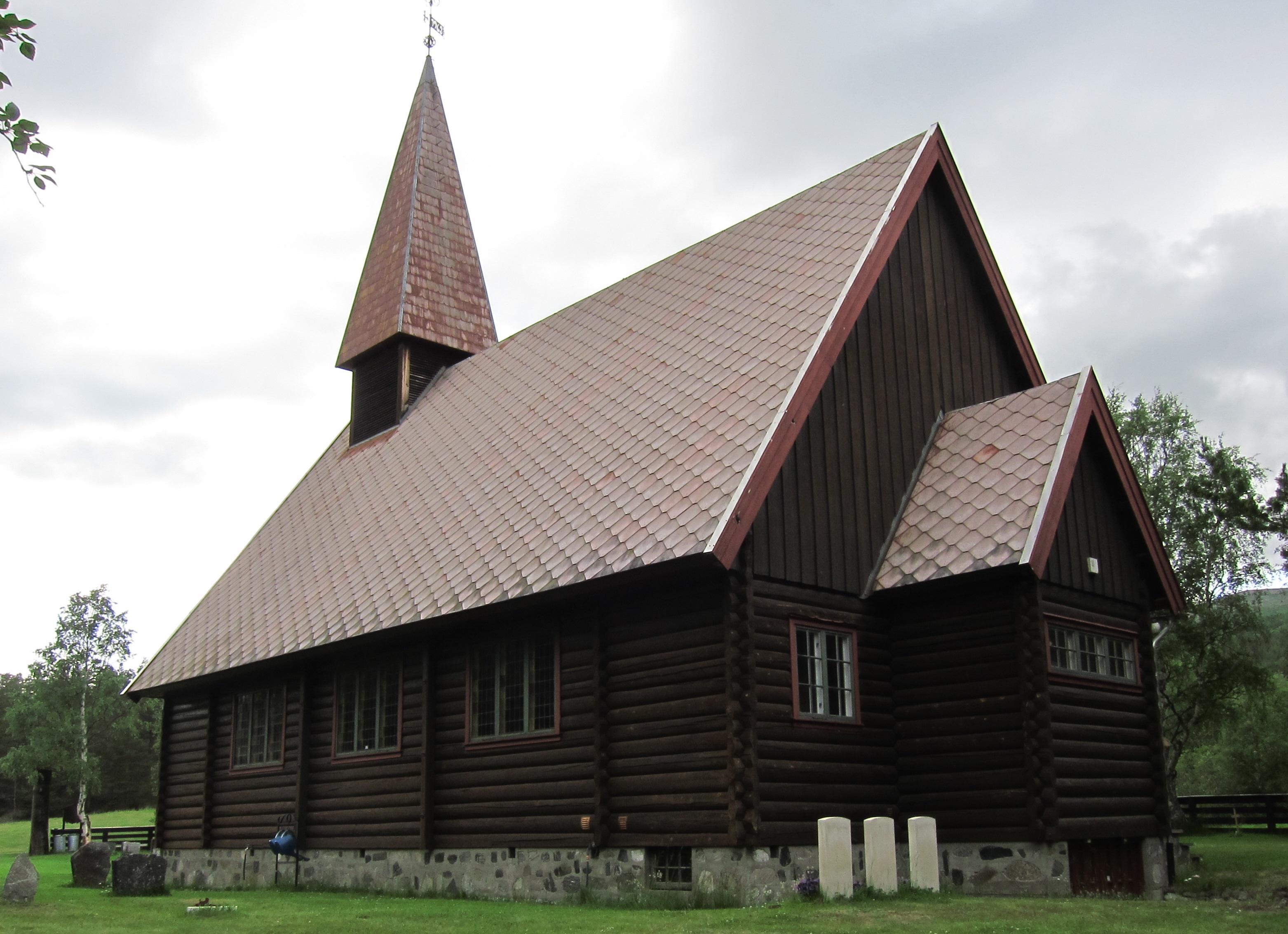

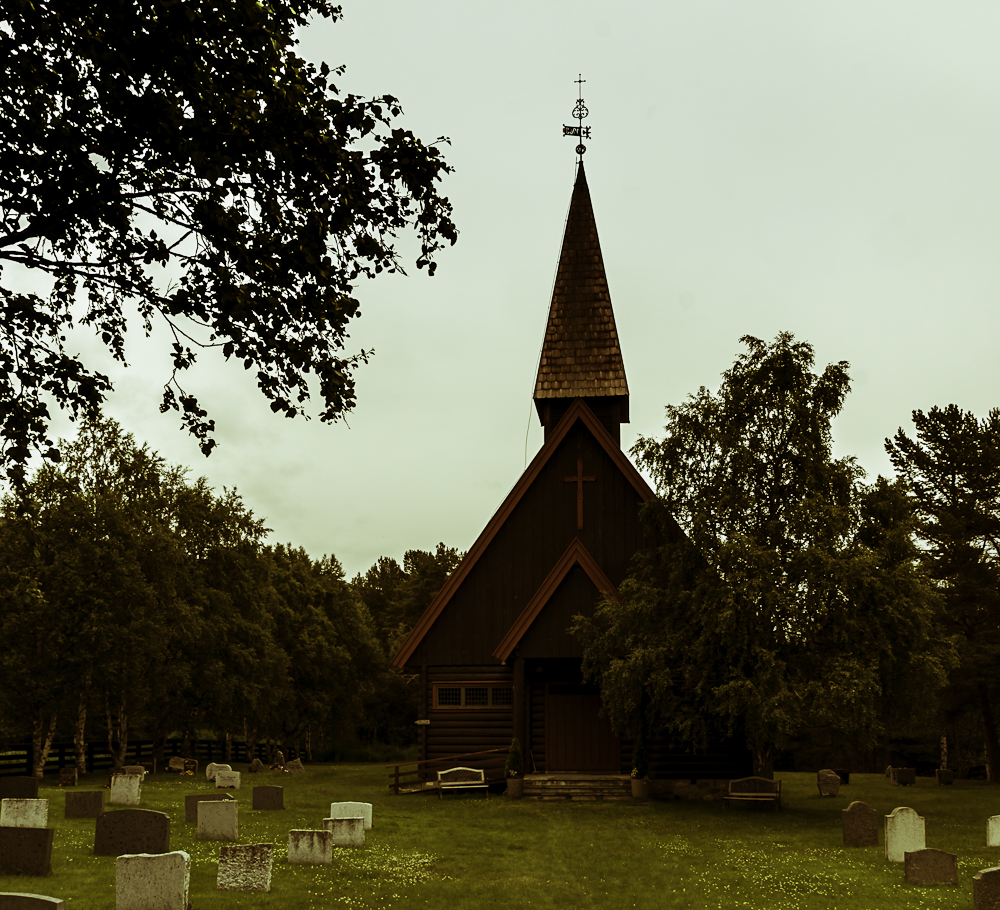

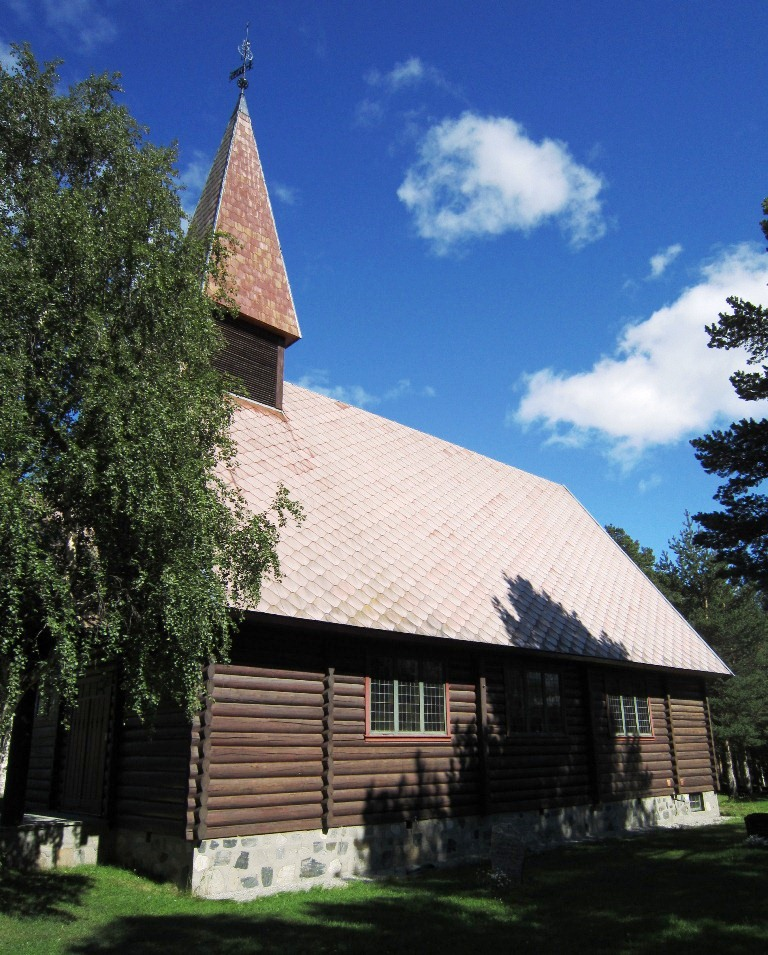

== See also ==
- List of churches in Hamar
