= Breiddalsvatnet =

Lake in Innlandet, Norway

- Breidalsvatnet
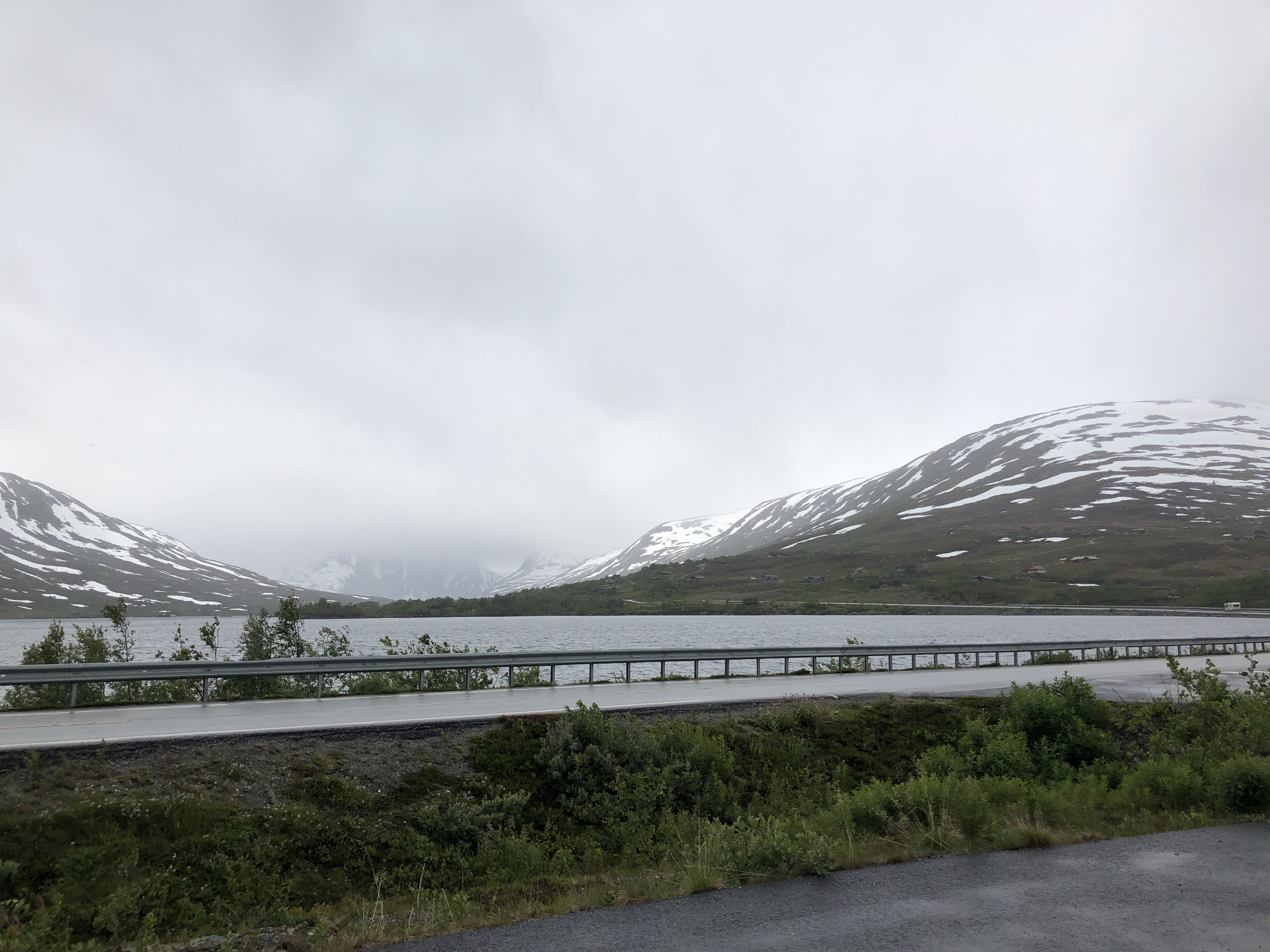
- Breiddalsvatnet
- Interactive map of the lake
- Location: Skjåk Municipality, Innlandet
- Coordinates: 62.014722°N 7.583333°E
- Primary inflows: Støre Lægervatnet lake
- Primary outflows: Grøtlivatnet lake
- Basin countries: Norway
- Max. length: 7 kilometres (4.3 mi)
- Max. width: 2 kilometres (1.2 mi)
- Surface area: 6.899 km^{2} (2.664 sq mi)
- Max. depth: 45.3 metres (149 ft)
- Shore length^{1}: 20.41 kilometres (12.68 mi)
- Surface elevation: 898 metres (2,946 ft)
- References: NVE
- ^{1} Shore length is not a well-defined measure.

Breiddalsvatnet is a lake in Skjåk Municipality in Innlandet county, Norway. The 6.9-square-kilometre (2.7 sq mi) lake lies just west of the village of Grotli. The Norwegian National Road 15 runs along the north side of the lake. The mountains Helleggi and Krosshø are located just north of the lake and the Breheimen National Park lies just south of the lake.

== See also ==
- List of lakes in Norway
