= Lesjaskog Church =

Church in Innlandet, Norway

- Lesjaskog kyrkje
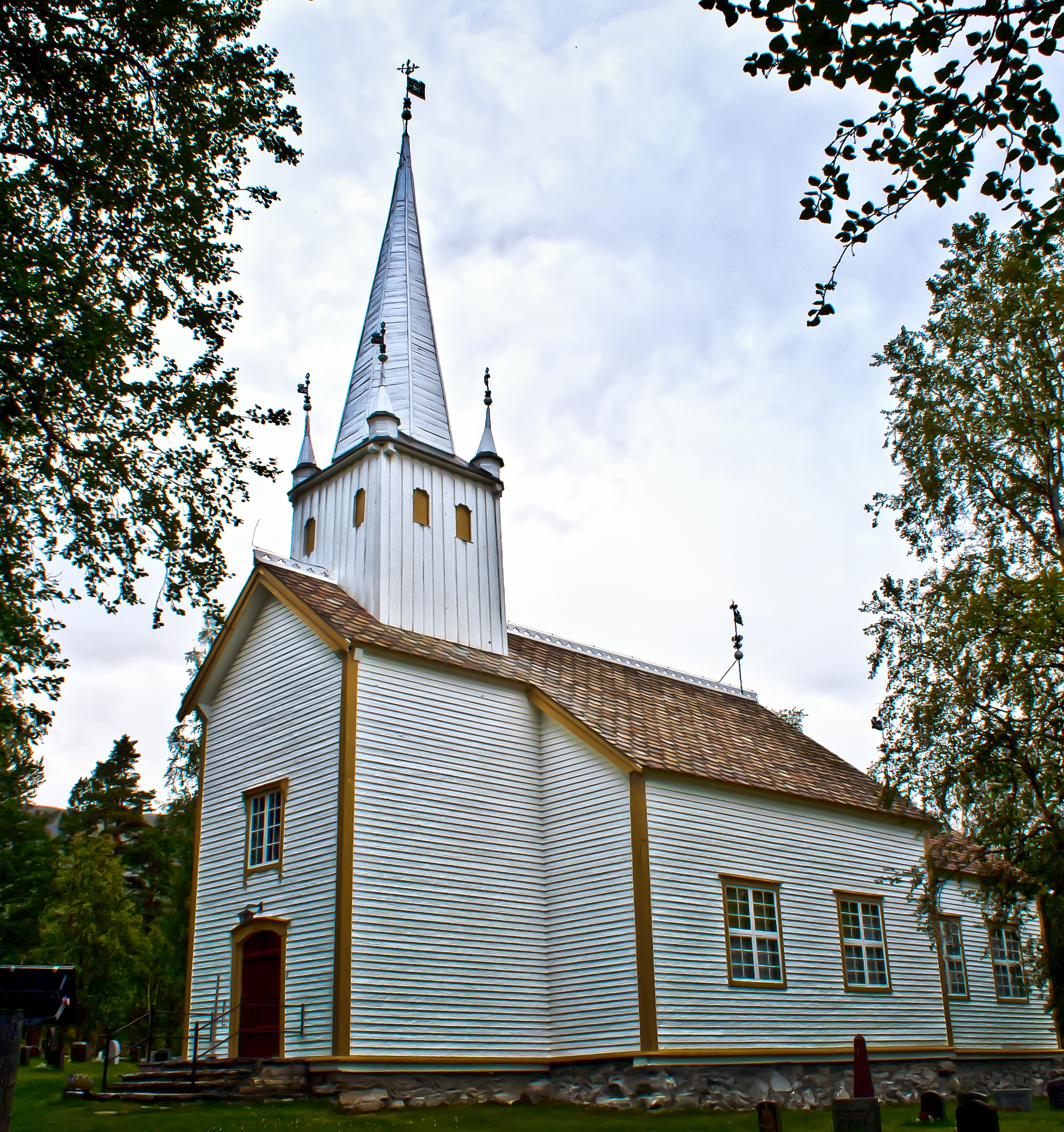
- View of the church
- Lesjaskog Church
- 62°13′59″N 8°20′50″E
- Location: Lesja Municipality, Innlandet
- Country: Norway
- Denomination: Church of Norway
- Previous denomination: Catholic Church
- Churchmanship: Evangelical Lutheran

History
- Status: Parish church
- Founded: 1695
- Consecrated: 20 September 1855
- Events: 1855: Church moved

Architecture
- Functional status: Active
- Architectural type: Long church
- Completed: 1695 (331 years ago)

Specifications
- Capacity: 250
- Materials: Wood

Administration
- Diocese: Hamar bispedømme
- Deanery: Nord-Gudbrandsdal prosti
- Parish: Lesja og Lesjaskog
- Norwegian Cultural Heritage Site
- Type: Church
- Status: Automatically protected
- ID: 84292

Lesjaskog Church (Norwegian: Lesjaskog kyrkje) is a parish church of the Church of Norway in Lesja Municipality in Innlandet county, Norway. It is located in the village of Lesjaskog. It is the church for the Lesja og Lesjaskog parish which is part of the Nord-Gudbrandsdal prosti (deanery) in the Diocese of Hamar. The white, wooden church was built in a long church design in 1697 using plans drawn up by an unknown architect. The church seats about 250 people.

== History ==
In 1660, an ironworks factory was established in Lesjaverk. Soon after, population growth and jobs in the area proved the need for a new church in the upper part of the Lesja parish. A new timber-framed long church was constructed in 1695. The church was originally named Lesjaverk kirke since it was the church for the Lesja ironworks. A new tower on the roof was built in 1767. The ironworks was closed in 1812 and the population of the area began to decline. By 1826, plans were made to move the church about 12 kilometres (7.5 mi) to the west to the village of Lesjaskog, but they were rejected. In 1845, the parish again requested to move the church and this time it was approved in 1848. In 1855, the old church was disassembled and moved to its new site and rebuilt there. The church was not rebuilt identically to its old design, but some modifications were made, including widening the choir and moving the tower from above the western end of the nave to moving it above the church porch. It also got new, larger windows and the roof was raised to give a higher ceiling inside. The newly rebuilt church was re-consecrated on 20 September 1855 and it was renamed Lesjaskog kirke. Later, in 1964, a new Lesjaverk Church was built on the old church site.

== See also ==
- List of churches in Hamar
