= Heggur Tunnel =

Road tunnel in Fjord Municipality, Norway

Heggur Tunnel Heggurtunnelen
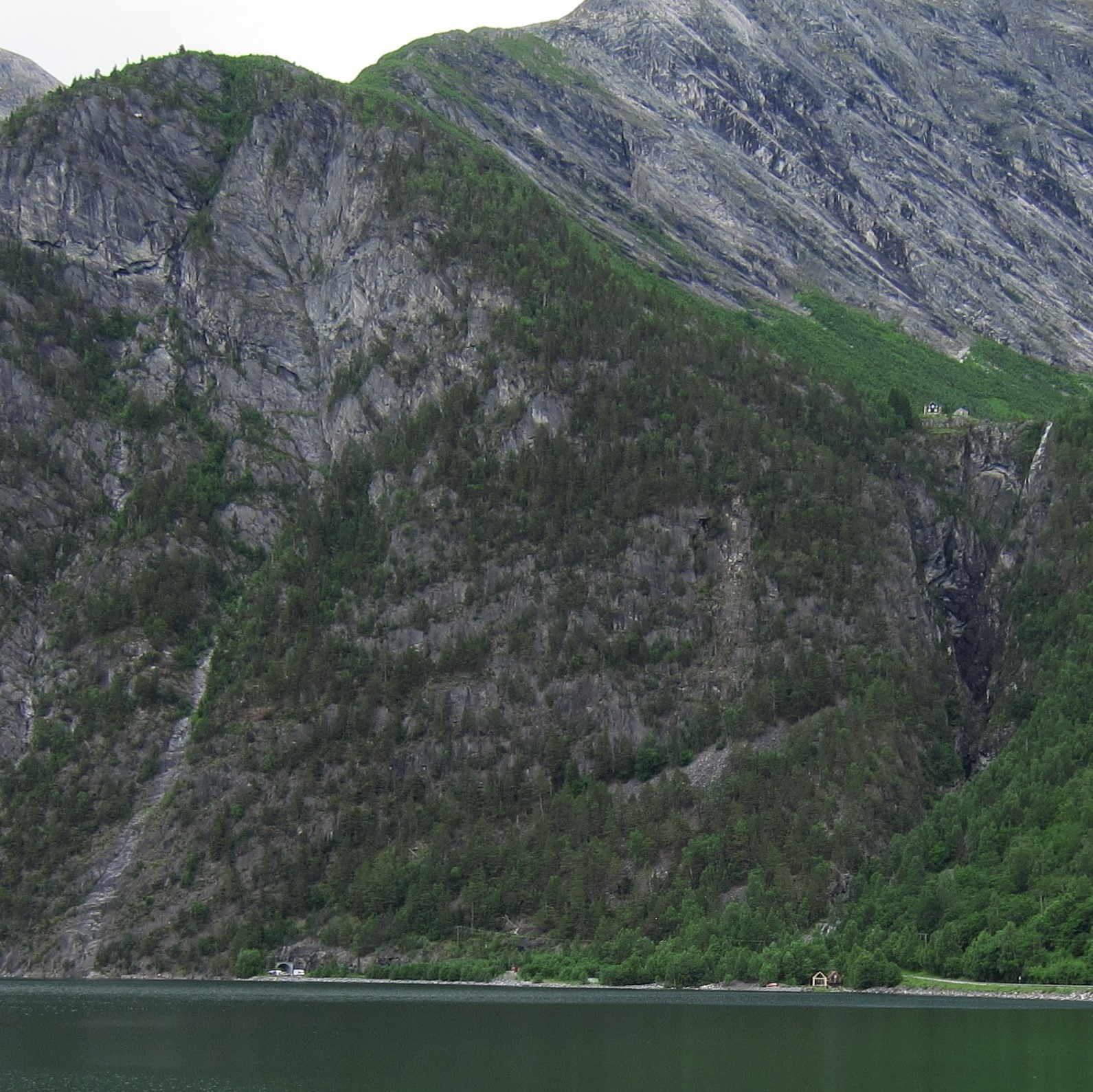
- Heggur Tunnel lower left corner, Muldal waterfall right hand.
- Interactive map of Heggur Tunnel; Heggurtunnelen

Overview
- Location: Møre og Romsdal, Norway
- Coordinates: 62.2767°N 7.3911°E
- Status: In use
- Route: Fv92

Operation
- Opened: 1982
- Traffic: Automotive
- Toll: None

Technical
- Length: 5,277 metres (3.3 mi)
- No. of lanes: 2
- Tunnel clearance: 3.1 metres (10 ft)

The Heggur Tunnel (Norwegian: Heggurtunnelen) is a road tunnel in Fjord Municipality in Møre og Romsdal county, Norway. The 5,277-metre (3.3 mi) long tunnel was built in 1982 to connect the isolated village of Tafjord to the rest of Norway's road network. The village is at the end of the Tafjorden which is surrounded by very steep mountains, where roads could not be built along the shoreline. The tunnel was built following the shoreline, but inside the mountain, giving drivers a safe passage to Tafjord.
