= Horrungen =

Mountain in Innlandet, Norway

- Interactive map of the mountain

Highest point
- Elevation: 1,832 m (6,010 ft)
- Prominence: 461 m (1,512 ft)
- Isolation: 11 km (6.8 mi) to Skardtind
- Coordinates: 61°56′14″N 8°26′06″E

Geography
- Location: Innlandet, Norway
- Parent range: Tafjordfjella

Horrungen is a mountain on the border of Skjåk Municipality and Lom Municipality in Innlandet county, Norway. The 1,832-metre (6,010 ft) tall mountain is located inside the Reinheimen National Park, about 10 kilometres (6.2 mi) northeast of the village of Bismo. The mountain is surrounded by several other notable mountains including Skardtind to the northeast, Trihøene to the north, Leirungshøe to the northeast, and Finndalshorungen to the east. The lake Aursjoen lies about 6 kilometres (3.7 mi) to the west of the mountain.

== See also ==
- List of mountains of Norway
