= Merratind =

Mountain in Lesja, Norway

- Merratinden
- Interactive map of the mountain

Highest point
- Elevation: 1,698 m (5,571 ft)
- Prominence: 183 m (600 ft)
- Isolation: 4.4 km (2.7 mi)
- Coordinates: 62°16′11″N 8°30′24″E

Geography
- Location: Innlandet, Norway
- Parent range: Dovrefjell

Merratind is a mountain in Lesja Municipality in Innlandet county, Norway. The 1,698-metre (5,571 ft) tall mountain lies about 9 kilometres (5.6 mi) northeast of the village of Lesjaskog. The mountain is surrounded by several other mountains including Vangshøi which is about 2.5 kilometres (1.6 mi) to the east, Svarthøi which is about 10 kilometres (6.2 mi) to the northwest, and Storhøi and Blåhøe which are about 5 kilometres (3.1 mi) to the northwest.

== See also ==
- List of mountains of Norway
