= Krosshø =

Mountain in Norway

- Krosshøe
- Interactive map of the mountain

Highest point
- Elevation: 1,854 m (6,083 ft)
- Prominence: 510 m (1,670 ft)
- Isolation: 8.2 km (5.1 mi) to Tordsnose
- Coordinates: 62°04′00″N 7°36′55″E

Geography
- Location: Innlandet, Norway
- Parent range: Tafjordfjella

Krosshø is a mountain in Skjåk Municipality in Innlandet county, Norway. The 1,854-metre (6,083 ft) tall mountain is located in the Tafjordfjella mountains, about 5 kilometres (3.1 mi) north of the village of Grotli. The mountain is surrounded by several other notable mountains including Helleggi to the northwest, Tordsnose to the north, and Vulueggi to the east. The lake Breiddalsvatnet lies just south of the mountain.

== See also ==
- List of mountains of Norway
