= Puttegga =

Mountain in Møre og Romsdal, Norway

- Pyttegga
- Interactive map of the mountain

Highest point
- Elevation: 1,999 m (6,558 ft)
- Prominence: 571 m (1,873 ft)
- Parent peak: Gråhø
- Isolation: 26.9 km (16.7 mi) to Gråhø
- Listing: #4 at List of highest points of Norwegian counties
- Coordinates: 62.2119°N 7.6956°E

Geography
- Location: Møre og Romsdal, Norway
- Parent range: Tafjordfjella
- Topo map: 1319 III Tafjord

Puttegga is the highest mountain in Møre og Romsdal county, Norway. It lies on the border of Fjord Municipality and Rauma Municipality. It is located just 4 kilometres (2.5 mi) northwest of the mountain Karitinden, inside Reinheimen National Park. The nearest village is Tafjord, 14 kilometres (8.7 mi) to the west. The mountain is easily accessed from the cabin Pyttbua to the east, which is maintained by the Norwegian Trekking Association.

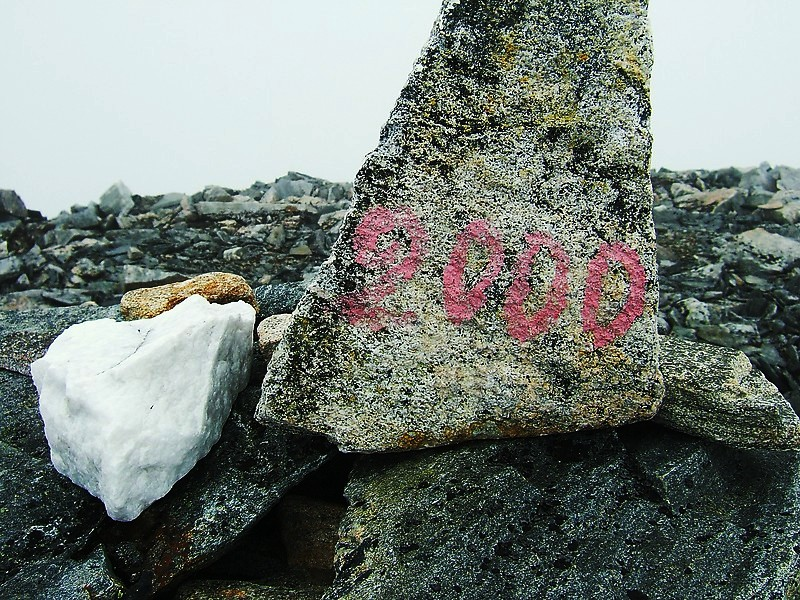
Painted on a raised stone on the summit by people wanting a 2K-summit in Møre og Romsdal

== Name ==
The first element is putt or pytt, meaning "puddle" or "small lake". The last element is the finite form of egg which means "edge" or "mountain ridge". The edge is surrounded by several small lakes.

== See also ==
- List of highest points of Norwegian counties
