= Storhøa (Rauma) =

Mountain in Central Norway

- Interactive map of the mountain

Highest point
- Elevation: 1,921 m (6,302 ft)
- Prominence: 411 m (1,348 ft)
- Parent peak: Store Gråhø
- Isolation: 6.2 km (3.9 mi)
- Coordinates: 62°10′39″N 7°59′01″E

Geography
- Location: Innlandet and Møre og Romsdal, Norway
- Parent range: Dovrefjell

Storhøa is a mountain in Norway. The mountain peak is a tripoint on the border between Rauma Municipality (in Møre og Romsdal county) and Lesja Municipality and Skjåk Municipality (in Innlandet county). The 1,921-metre (6,302 ft) tall mountain lies within Reinheimen National Park, about 21 kilometres (13 mi) east-northeast of the village of Lesjaskog. The mountain is surrounded by several other mountains including Trollkyrkja and Benkehøa to the west, Sponghøi to the south, and Digerkampen to the southeast.

== See also ==
- List of mountains of Norway
