= Lesjaverk =

Village in Lesja Municipality, Norway

- Village
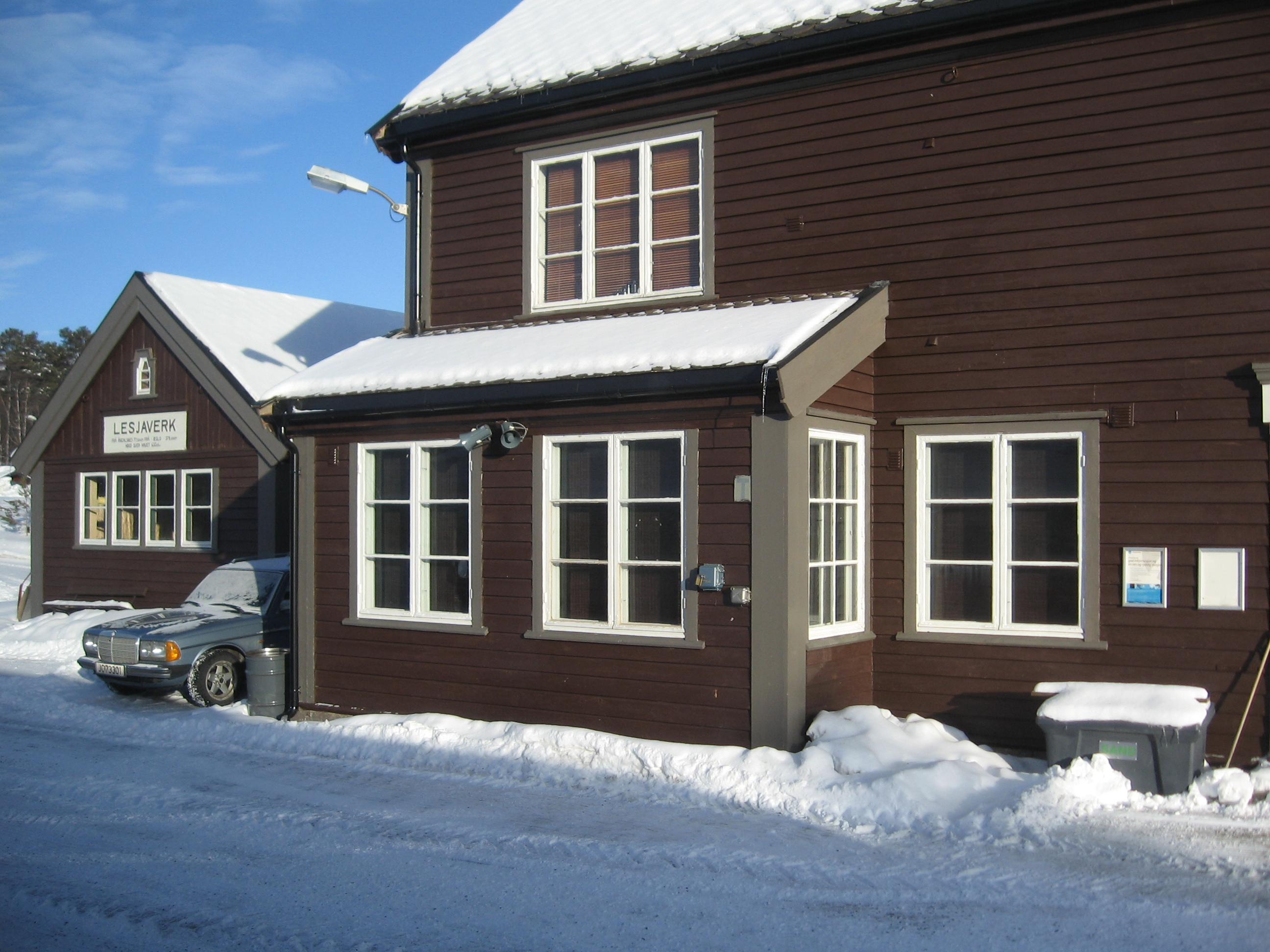
- View of the village railway station
- Interactive map of Lesjaverk
- Location within Innlandet Location within Norway
- Coordinates: 62.19229°N 8.54062°E
- Country: Norway
- Region: Eastern Norway
- County: Innlandet
- District: Gudbrandsdalen
- Municipality: Lesja Municipality
- Elevation: 634 m (2,080 ft)
- Time zone: UTC+01:00 (CET)
  - Summer (DST): UTC+02:00 (CEST)
- Post Code: 2667 Lesjaverk

Lesjaverk is a village in Lesja Municipality in Innlandet county, Norway. It lies in the upper Gudbrandsdal valley approximately 35 kilometres (22 mi) northwest of Dombås and about 11 kilometres (6.8 mi) east of the village of Lesjaskog. The village lies along the European route E136 highway and the Raumabanen railway line. The E136 highway goes from Ålesund up through the Romsdalen valley and passes through Lesjaverk on the way to its end point at Dombås. Located in a high mountain pass at 633 metres (2,077 ft) in elevation, the village is situated between several mountains including the 1,883-metre (6,178 ft) tall Svarthøe, the 1,868-metre (6,129 ft) tall Storhøi, and the 1,702-metre (5,584 ft) tall Merratind which all are part of the Dovrefjell range to the north. The 1,780-metre (5,840 ft) tall mountain Digervarden lies to the south on the other side of the valley.

== History ==
Lesjaverk lies on an important trade route used in prehistoric times. The area is first mentioned in the written chronicle of the Heimskringla (The Chronicle of the Kings of Norway) by Snorri Sturluson. The account of King Olaf's (A.D. 1015–1021) conversion of Dale-Gudbrand to Christianity is popularly recognized. King Olaf's success was short-lived, for in 1029 the Norwegian nobles, seething with discontent, rallied round the invading Knut the Great, and Olaf had to flee. To avoid engaging a fleet of 25 ships, 400 of King Olav's men and 100 loyal peasant farmers from Romsdal built a road up from the Romsdalfjord which passed through the area that became known as Lesjaverk. His men fled along this road and across Gudbrandsdal. There he was not warmly received since he had killed King Thorer of Gudbrandsdal, so he went on to Hedmark. From there he proceeded to Sweden and on to Russia. On his return a year later he fell at the Battle of Stiklestad.

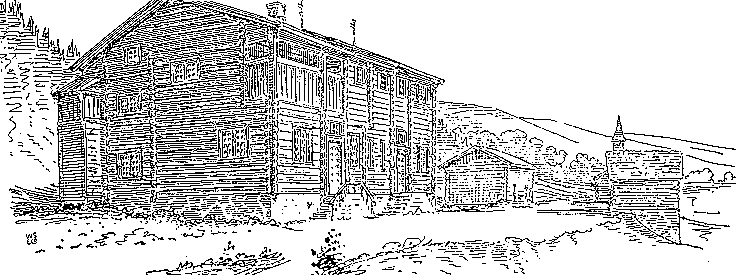
The Lesja Ironwork, Norway, main building as it would have looked around 1752. The illustration by Professor Johan Meyer dates from 1910.

Iron smelting is recorded at Lesjaverk as early as 1614, when King Christian IV of Denmark and Norway authorized the Romsdal Market at Devold on the Rauma river 4 miles upstream of Åndalsnes. With this change, Molde assumed the role as principal market town for Romsdal formerly held by Veøy. This change was made to provide the ironworkers at Lesjaverk with a convenient outlet for their products as well as providing them a market to purchases goods and food supplies such as stockfish and grain.

Lesja jernverk (Lesja Iron Works) or Lesjaverk formally operated from 1659 to 1812 in what is now Lesja Municipality and was an important Dano-Norwegian iron works. When the forest was hewn, iron production was no longer economically viable at Lesjaverk, and the works were closed in 1812. The abandoned mines at Gruvlia, Håmårfossen and Stellsteinberget, as well as the former iron smelter and charcoal kilns can still be seen. A historical path with signs provides the visitor with an overview of the original operation; the oldest ironworks of this magnitude in Norway.

The village lies at the east end of the bifurcation lake Lesjaskogsvatnet. This lake originally only flowed west into the Rauma river at the village of Lesjaskog and onwards through the magnificent Romsdalen valley. A 3 metres (9.8 ft) high dam was constructed by the Lesja Iron Works in the 1660s to improve transportation caused the water to also flow eastward into the river Gudbrandsdalslågen. The lake lies at an elevation of 611 metres (2,005 ft) above sea level and it covers about 5 square kilometres (1.9 sq mi) in area.

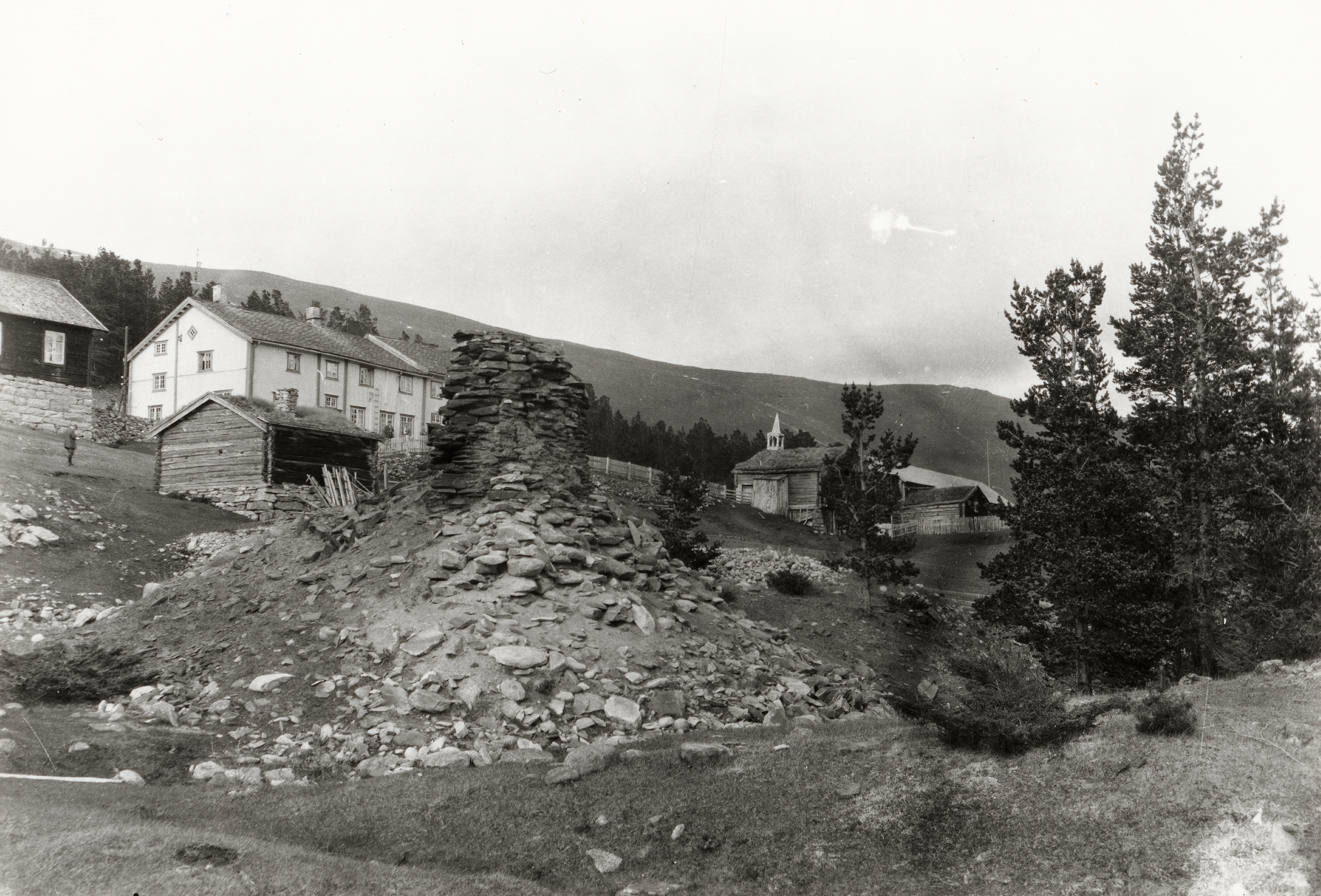
Lesja iron works buildings with remains of the blast furnace.

The people who established the Lesja Verk built their own church (Lesjaverk Church) for the workers in 1695, but the church building was moved to Lesjaskog in 1855. The church in Lesjaverk was a satellite church of that in Lesja, as was the Folldal Church which served the Folldal works (Folldal Verk) copper mines. Per Berg reports,

“When the sexton Ola Kring died in Lesja in 1751, Frederik Wiborg was appointed sexton there and was presented to the congregation on the third Sunday following Trinity. There certainly wasn't anything very special about being a teacher in Ringsaker, if he was willing to change that for being a sexton. No house or land went with the post and the work was hard. In the Lesja parish there were three satellite churches - Lesjeverk, Dovre, and Folldal. The travel distances were great and it could be very difficult in the winter.”

During the German invasion of World War II, while retreating from Oslo half the Government stayed for one night at Lesjaverk, eight days before evacuating to London. King Haakon and Crown Prince Olav traveled over high-mountain roads, leaving Vågåmo on 17 April 1940 and passed through Lesjaverk on the way to Molde. With the evacuation of the King and the Cabinet from Molde to Tromsø on 29 April, and the allied evacuation of Åndalsnes on 1 May, formal Norwegian military resistance to the German invasion in Southern Norway came to an end.
