= Kjølen (Lesja) =

Mountain in Lesja, Norway

- Interactive map of the mountain

Highest point
- Elevation: 1,784 m (5,853 ft)
- Prominence: 95 m (312 ft)
- Coordinates: 62°00′29″N 8°35′29″E

Geography
- Location: Innlandet, Norway

Kjølen is a mountain in Lesja Municipality in Innlandet county, Norway. The 1,784-metre (5,853 ft) tall mountain lies inside Reinheimen National Park, about 9 kilometres (5.6 mi) southwest of the village of Lesja. The mountain is surrounded by several other mountains including Søre Kjølhaugen which is about 2.7 kilometres (1.7 mi) to the east, Knatthøin which is about 6 kilometres (3.7 mi) to the southeast, Skardtind which is about 10 kilometres (6.2 mi) to the southwest, and Trihøene which is about 15 kilometres (9.3 mi) to the west-southwest.

== See also ==
- List of mountains of Norway
