= Svarthøe =

Mountain in Lesja, Norway

- Svarthøi / Svarthøa
- Interactive map of the mountain

Highest point
- Elevation: 1,883 m (6,178 ft)
- Prominence: 599 m (1,965 ft)
- Isolation: 4.1 km (2.5 mi) to Kleneggen
- Coordinates: 62°19′23″N 8°19′59″E

Geography
- Location: Innlandet, Norway
- Parent range: Dovrefjell

Svarthøe is a mountain in Lesja Municipality in Innlandet county, Norway. The 1,883-metre (6,178 ft) tall mountain lies about 10 kilometres (6.2 mi) north of the village of Lesjaskog. The mountain is surrounded by several other mountains including Storhøi and Blåhøe which are about 6 kilometres (3.7 mi) to the southeast and Merratind and Vangshøe which are about 11 kilometres (6.8 mi) to the southeast.

== See also ==
- List of mountains of Norway
