= Helleggi =

Mountain in Norway

- Hellstugueggi / Helleggje
- Interactive map of the mountain

Highest point
- Elevation: 1,666 m (5,466 ft)
- Prominence: 213 m (699 ft)
- Isolation: 2.7 km (1.7 mi) to Nibba
- Coordinates: 62°05′51″N 7°30′50″E

Geography
- Location: Innlandet and Møre og Romsdal, Norway
- Parent range: Tafjordfjella

Helleggi is a mountain on the border of Fjord Municipality in Møre og Romsdal county and Skjåk Municipality in Innlandet county in Norway. The 1,666-metre (5,466 ft) tall mountain is located in the Tafjordfjella mountains, about 11 kilometres (6.8 mi) northwest of the village of Grotli. The mountain is surrounded by several other notable mountains including Krosshø to the southeast and Breiddalseggi to the southwest.

== See also ==
- List of mountains of Norway
