= Tafjorden =

Fjord in Møre og Romsdal, Norway

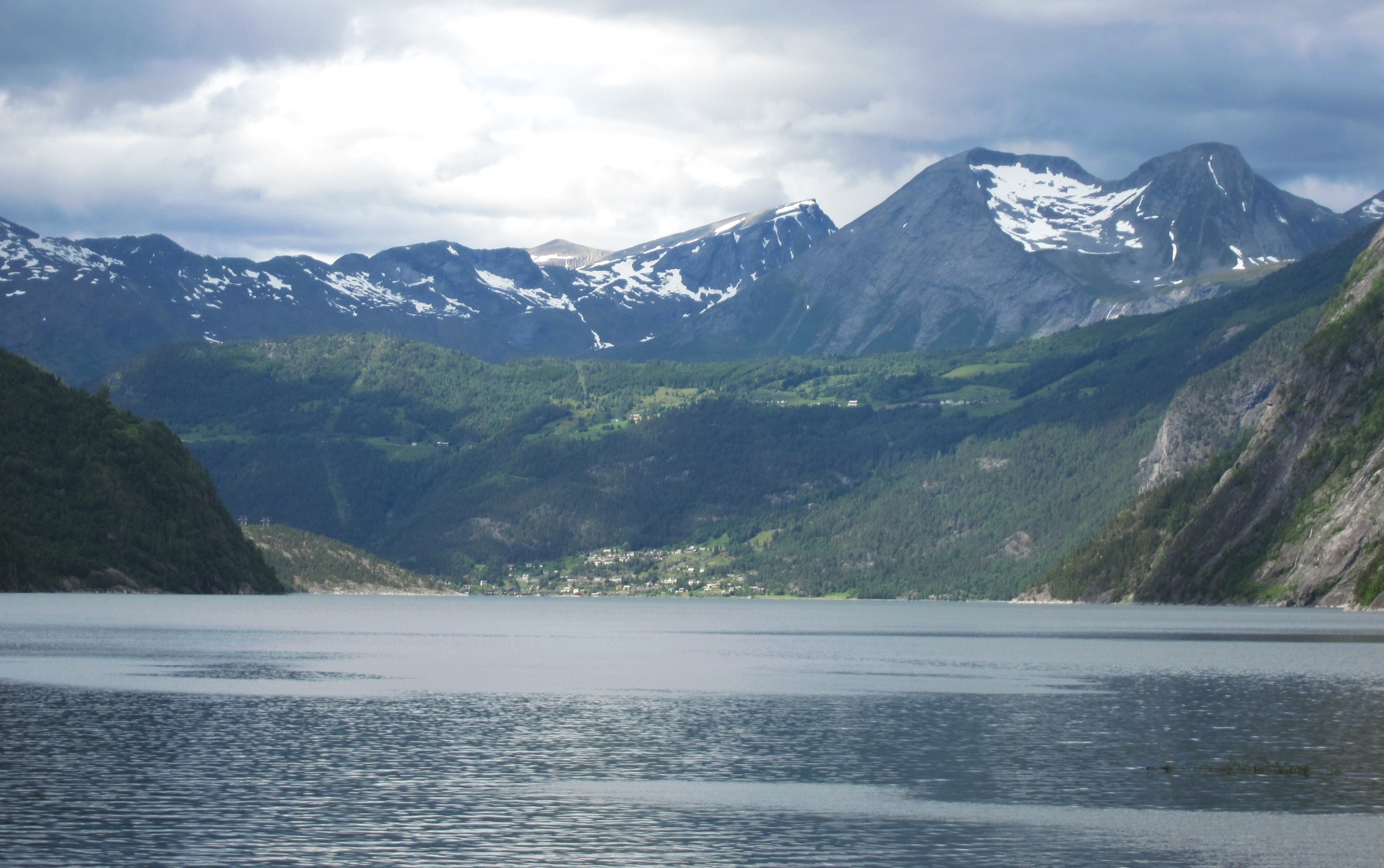
- View of Fjørå along Tafjorden
- Interactive map of the fjord
- Location: Møre og Romsdal county, Norway
- Coordinates: 62.2877°N 7.3438°E
- Type: Fjord
- Primary inflows: Storelva river
- Primary outflows: Norddalsfjorden
- Basin countries: Norway
- Max. length: 12 kilometres (7.5 mi)
- Max. width: 1.8 kilometres (1.1 mi)
- Settlements: Tafjord

Tafjorden is an inner branch of the Norddalsfjorden/Storfjorden in Fjord Municipality in Møre og Romsdal county, Norway. It is part of the UNESCO World Heritage Site West Norwegian Fjords. The fjord is located southeast of the village of Sylte. The small village of Tafjord is located at the end of the 12-kilometre (7.5 mi) long Tafjorden. The only road leading to the rather isolated village of Tafjord goes through the 5,277-metre (3.3 mi) long Heggur Tunnel plus several other smaller tunnels on the northern shore of the fjord.

== History ==
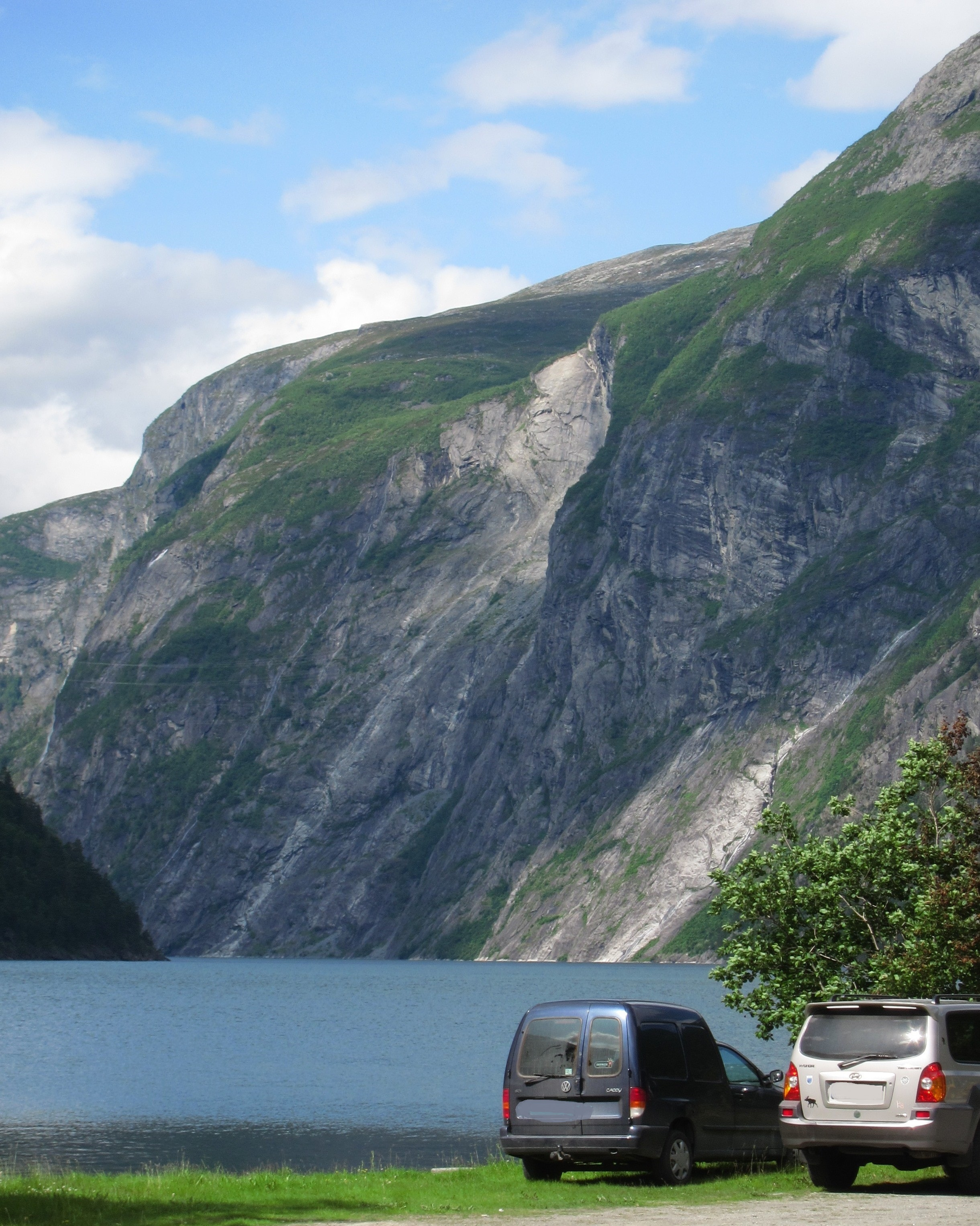
Inner part of Tafjorden, scar of the 1934 landslide visible in the middle of the photo.

When Olaf II of Norway fled up the Storfjorden to escape the forces of Canute the Great, he and his men journeyed up the fjord until he passed through the Norddalsfjorden and reached the Tafjorden. From there they passed north up the Valldalen valley and across the mountains to Lesja on his way to exile in Russia.

On 7 April 1934, a landslide of about 2,000,000 cubic metres (2,600,000 yd^{3}) of rock fell off the mountain Langhamaren from a height of about 700 metres (2,300 ft). The rock landed in the Tafjorden which created a local tsunami which killed 40 people living on the shore of the fjord. The waves reached a height of 62 metres (203 ft) near the landslide, about 7 metres (23 ft) at Sylte, and about 16 metres (52 ft) at Tafjord. It was one of the worst natural disasters in Norway in the 20th century.

== See also ==
- List of Norwegian fjords
