= Buakollen =

Mountain in Lesja, Norway

- Interactive map of the mountain

Highest point
- Elevation: 1,685 m (5,528 ft)
- Prominence: 85 m (279 ft)
- Isolation: 1.5 km (0.93 mi)
- Coordinates: 62°04′08″N 8°13′28″E

Geography
- Location: Innlandet, Norway

Buakollen is a mountain in Lesja Municipality in Innlandet county, Norway. The 1,685-metre (5,528 ft) tall mountain lies within the Reinheimen National Park, about 8 kilometres (5.0 mi) southwest of the mountain Digervarden and about 2.5 kilometres (1.6 mi) west of the mountain Grønhøe. The mountain Løyfthøene lies about 3.9 kilometres (2.4 mi) to the west of Buakollen and the mountain Skarvedalseggen lies about 7 kilometres (4.3 mi) to the southwest. The village of Lesjaskog lies about 20 kilometres (12 mi) north of the mountain.

== See also ==
- List of mountains of Norway
