= Karitinden =

Mountain in Central Norway

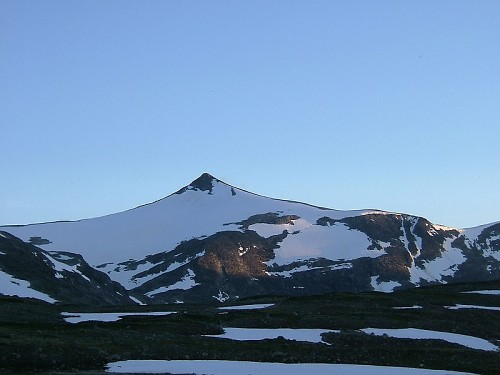
- View of Karitinden

Highest point
- Elevation: 1,983 m (6,506 ft)
- Prominence: 341 m (1,119 ft)
- Parent peak: Puttegga
- Isolation: 3.9 km (2.4 mi) to Puttegga
- Coordinates: 62°11′07″N 7°44′04″E

Geography
- Interactive map of the mountain
- Location: Møre og Romsdal and Innlandet, Norway
- Parent range: Tafjordfjella
- Topo map: 1319 II Tordsvatnet

Climbing
- Easiest route: Hiking

Karitinden is a mountain in the Tafjordfjella mountain range inside Reinheimen National Park on the border of Innlandet and Møre og Romsdal counties in Norway. The top of the mountain is a tripoint border junction for Skjåk Municipality (in Innlandet county), and Fjord Municipality and Rauma Municipality (in Møre og Romsdal county).

The nearest village is Tafjord which lies 17 kilometres (11 mi) to the northwest. The lake Tordsvatnet lies 4 kilometres (2.5 mi) southeast of the mountain and the mountain Puttegga lies 4 kilometres (2.5 mi) to the northwest. Other mountains that surround the mountain include Benkehøa to the southeast, Veltdalseggi to the south, and Tordsnose to the southwest.

== Name ==
The first element is the female name Kari and the last element is the definite form of tind which means "mountain peak". The reason for the name, and who the person Kari was, is unknown.

== See also ==
- List of mountains of Norway
