= Storhøe (Lesja) =

Mountain in Lesja, Norway

- Storhøi
- Interactive map of the mountain

Highest point
- Elevation: 1,867 m (6,125 ft)
- Prominence: 347 m (1,138 ft)
- Parent peak: Svarthøi
- Isolation: 4.8 km (3.0 mi) to Svarthøe
- Coordinates: 62°17′50″N 8°24′41″E

Geography
- Location: Innlandet, Norway
- Parent range: Dovrefjell

Storhøe is a mountain in Lesja Municipality in Innlandet county, Norway. The 1,867-metre (6,125 ft) tall mountain lies about 7.5 kilometres (4.7 mi) northeast of the village of Lesjaskog. The mountain is surrounded by several other mountains including Vangshøe and Merratind which are about 6 kilometres (3.7 mi) to the southeast, Blåhøe which is about 2 kilometres (1.2 mi) to the south-southeast, and Svarthøe which is about 5 kilometres (3.1 mi) to the northwest.

== See also ==
- List of mountains of Norway
