= Søre Kjølhaugen =

Mountain in Lesja, Norway

- Søndre Kjølhaugen (historic)
- Interactive map of the mountain

Highest point
- Elevation: 1,765 m (5,791 ft)
- Prominence: 83 m (272 ft)
- Isolation: 7 km (4.3 mi)
- Coordinates: 62°02′42″N 8°48′34″E

Geography
- Location: Innlandet, Norway

Søre Kjølhaugen is a mountain in Lesja Municipality in Innlandet county, Norway. The 1,765-metre (5,791 ft) tall mountain lies inside Reinheimen National Park, about 8 kilometres (5.0 mi) south of the village of Lesja. The mountain is surrounded by several other mountains including Knatthøin which is about 2.5 kilometres (1.6 mi) to the southeast, Skardtind which is about 13 kilometres (8.1 mi) to the southwest, and Kjølen which is about 3 kilometres (1.9 mi) to the northwest.

== See also ==
- List of mountains of Norway
