= Digerkampen =

Mountain in Lesja, Norway

- Interactive map of the mountain

Highest point
- Elevation: 1,948 m (6,391 ft)
- Prominence: 233 m (764 ft)
- Isolation: 5 km (3.1 mi) to Blåhøe
- Coordinates: 62°07′46″N 8°03′56″E

Geography
- Location: Innlandet, Norway

Digerkampen is a mountain in Lesja Municipality in Innlandet county, Norway. The 1,948-metre (6,391 ft) tall mountain lies inside Reinheimen National Park, about 20 kilometres (12 mi) southwest of the village of Lesjaskog. The mountain Holhøi lies about 3.5 kilometres (2.2 mi) to the southeast, the mountain Skarvehøi lies about 6 kilometres (3.7 mi) to the east, and the mountain Storhøa lies about 6.8 kilometres (4.2 mi) to the northwest. The mountain Gråhø lies about 5.5 kilometres (3.4 mi) south of Digerkampen and the Storbreen glacier lies in between the two mountains.

== See also ==
- List of mountains of Norway
