= Knatthøin =

Mountain in Lesja, Norway

- Interactive map of the mountain

Highest point
- Elevation: 1,703 m (5,587 ft)
- Prominence: 43 m (141 ft)
- Isolation: 2.2 km (1.4 mi)
- Coordinates: 62°01′45″N 8°51′00″E

Geography
- Location: Innlandet, Norway

Knatthøin is a mountain in Lesja Municipality in Innlandet county, Norway. The 1,883-metre (6,178 ft) tall mountain lies inside Reinheimen National Park, about 10 kilometres (6.2 mi) south of the village of Lesja. The mountain is surrounded by several other mountains including Søre Kjølhaugen which is about 3 kilometres (1.9 mi) to the northwest, Kjølen which is about 6 kilometres (3.7 mi) to the northwest, and Skardtind which is about 14 kilometres (8.7 mi) to the west.

== See also ==
- List of mountains of Norway
