= Skardtind =

Mountain in Innlandet, Norway

- Skardtinden
- Interactive map of the mountain

Highest point
- Elevation: 1,883 m (6,178 ft)
- Prominence: 583 m (1,913 ft)
- Isolation: 22.8 km (14.2 mi) to Storivilen
- Coordinates: 62°00′29″N 8°35′29″E

Geography
- Location: Innlandet, Norway

Skardtind is a mountain in Innlandet county, Norway. The mountain is a tripoint on the border between Skjåk Municipality, Lom Municipality, and Lesja Municipality. The 1,883-metre (6,178 ft) tall mountain lies inside Reinheimen National Park, about 18 kilometres (11 mi) southwest of the village of Lesja. The mountain is surrounded by several other mountains including Trihøene which is about 6 kilometres (3.7 mi) to the west, Horrungen which is about 11 kilometres (6.8 mi) to the southwest, and Kjølen, Søre Kjølhaugen, and Knatthøin which are all about 10 kilometres (6.2 mi) to the northeast. The mountain Ryggehøi lies about 2.5 kilometres (1.6 mi) to the south and the mountain Rundkollan lies about 4.3 kilometres (2.7 mi) to the southeast.

== See also ==
- List of mountains of Norway
