= Digervarden =

Mountain in Lesja, Norway

- Interactive map of the mountain

Highest point
- Elevation: 1,780 m (5,840 ft)
- Prominence: 273 m (896 ft)
- Isolation: 9.9 km (6.2 mi)
- Coordinates: 62°06′56″N 8°20′44″E

Geography
- Location: Innlandet, Norway

Digervarden is a mountain in Lesja Municipality in Innlandet county, Norway. The 1,780-metre (5,840 ft) tall mountain lies inside Reinheimen National Park, about 13 kilometres (8.1 mi) south of the village of Lesjaskog. The mountain Mehøi lies about 2 kilometres (1.2 mi) northeast and the mountain Grønhøe lies about 5 kilometres (3.1 mi) to the southwest.

== See also ==
- List of mountains of Norway
