= Gråhø (Lesja) =

Mountain in Lesja, Norway

- Gråhøe
- Interactive map of the mountain

Highest point
- Elevation: 2,014 m (6,608 ft)
- Prominence: 979 m (3,212 ft)
- Isolation: 29.9 km (18.6 mi) to Hestdalshøgdi
- Coordinates: 62°14′58″N 8°30′53″E

Geography
- Location: Innlandet, Norway
- Parent range: Reinheimen

Gråhø is a mountain in Lesja Municipality in Innlandet county, Norway. The 2,014-metre (6,608 ft) tall mountain is the tallest mountain within Reinheimen National Park. The mountain lies about 20 kilometres (12 mi) southwest of the village of Lesjaskog. The mountain is surrouneded by several other mountains including Løyfthøene which lies about 2 kilometres (1.2 mi) to the east, Skarvedalseggen and Stamåhjulet which are about 3 kilometres (1.9 mi) to the southwest, Blåhøe which lies about 2 kilometres (1.2 mi) to the northwest, Digerkampen which lies about 7 kilometres (4.3 mi) to the north, and Holhøi which lies about 4 kilometres (2.5 mi) to the northeast.

== See also ==
- List of mountains of Norway
