= Tafjordfjella =

Mountain range in Central Norway

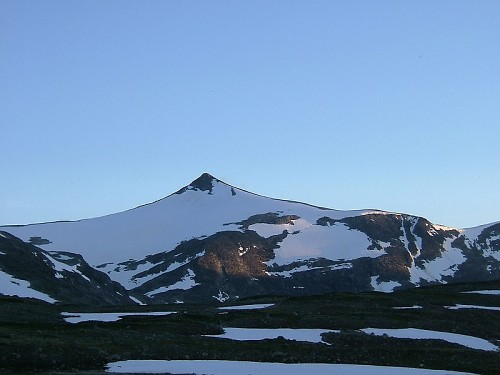
- View of the mountain Karitinden

Highest point
- Peak: Puttegga, Sunnmøre, Norway
- Elevation: 1,999 m (6,558 ft)
- Coordinates: 62°12′42″N 07°44′41″E

Geography
- Location: Møre og Romsdal and Innlandet, Norway
- Range coordinates: 62.2366°N 7.6452°E

Tafjordfjella or Tafjordfjellene (English: The Tafjord mountains) is a mountain range in Møre og Romsdal and Innlandet counties, Norway. It is located in the municipalities of Fjord, Stranda, Rauma, and Skjåk. The area takes its name from the village of Tafjord and the Tafjorden, the main entry point. The highest peaks are Puttegga at 1,999 metres (6,558 ft), Karitinden at 1,982 metres (6,503 ft), Tordsnose at 1,975 metres (6,480 ft), and Høgstolen at 1,953 metres (6,407 ft).

The area has lakes, including Tordsvatnet, Veltdalsvatnet, Zakariasdammen, and Grønvatnet. Part of the range is included inside Reinheimen National Park.

The Norwegian Trekking Association has Reindalsseter, Pyttbua, Veltdalshytta, Vakkerstøylen, and Danskehytta cabins. The western part of the area has, since 1923, been extensively developed for hydro-electric power production by the Tafjord Kraft company.

== See also ==
- List of mountains of Norway
