= Lesjaskog =

Village in Lesja Municipality, Norway

- Village
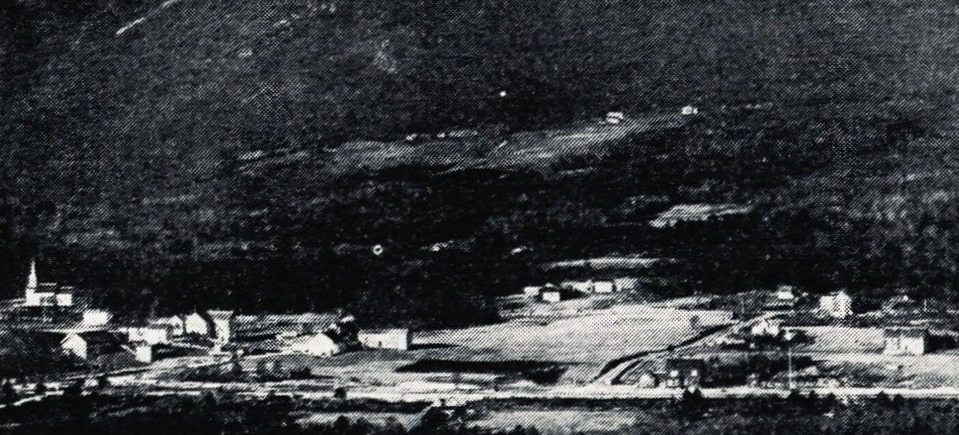
- View of the village
- Interactive map of Lesjaskog
- Location within Innlandet Location within Norway
- Coordinates: 62.23273°N 8.356555555555°E
- Country: Norway
- Region: Eastern Norway
- County: Innlandet
- District: Gudbrandsdalen
- Municipality: Lesja Municipality
- Elevation: 629 m (2,064 ft)
- Time zone: UTC+01:00 (CET)
  - Summer (DST): UTC+02:00 (CEST)
- Post Code: 2668 Lesjaskog

Lesjaskog is a village in Lesja Municipality in Innlandet county, Norway. The village is located at the west end of the lake Lesjaskogsvatnet about 11 kilometres (6.8 mi) west of the village of Lesjaverk and about 10 kilometres (6.2 mi) east of the village of Bjorli. The European route E136 highway and the Raumabanen railway line both run through the village. Lesjaskog Church is located in the village.

The lake Lesjaskogsvatnet has outlets at both ends. A dam that was constructed by the Lesja Iron Works at the nearby village of Lesjaverk in the 1660s in order to improve transportation caused the water which normally drained only to the Rauma River to also flow eastwards into the Gudbrandsdalslågen river to the east.

During the Second World War during the Namsos Campaign the British No. 263 Squadron RAF operated with 18 Gloster Gladiator biplane fighters from the frozen surface of Lake Lesjaskogsvatnet at Lesjaskog.
