= Reinheimen National Park =

National park in Norway

- IUCN category II (national park)

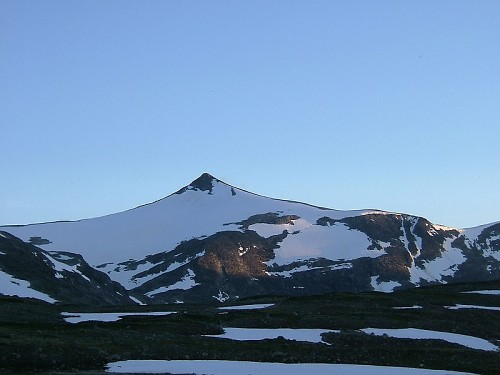
- Karitinden
- Interactive map of Reinheimen National Park
- Location: Innlandet and Møre og Romsdal, Norway
- Nearest city: Åndalsnes, Dombås, Vågåmo
- Coordinates: 62°07′15″N 8°10′41″E
- Area: 1,969 km^{2} (760 sq mi)
- Established: 2006
- Governing body: Directorate for Nature Management

Reinheimen National Park (Norwegian: Reinheimen nasjonalpark) is a national park in Norway that was established in 2006. The park consists of a 1,969-square-kilometre (760 sq mi) continuous protected mountain area. It is located in Møre og Romsdal and Innlandet counties in Norway. The park includes parts of the municipalities of Lesja, Skjåk, Vågå, Lom, Fjord, and Rauma. The park consists of much of the Tafjordfjella mountain range as well as the reindeer habitat in the northern part of the Ottadalen valley.

The park is one of the largest wilderness areas still intact in Western Norway. Much of the original alpine ecosystem, including wild reindeer, wolverines, golden eagles, gyr falcons, and ptarmigans, is still intact. The park is made up of numerous mountains and valleys. The highest mountains in the park tower are more than 2,000 metres (6,600 ft) above sea level. The landscape in Reinheimen is extremely varied. In the west, it is very dramatic, with sharply pointed peaks and knife-edge ridges, and rapidly flowing rivers. Towards the east, the terrain is more gently sloping, plateaus occur, valleys are broader and rivers flow more slowly. A number of rivers, such as the Istra, Rauma, Lora, Finna/Skjerva, Valldøla, and Tora/Føysa, have their sources in Reinheimen.
