= Breheimsenteret =

Museum in Norway

Coordinates: 61°39′18″N 7°16′30″E

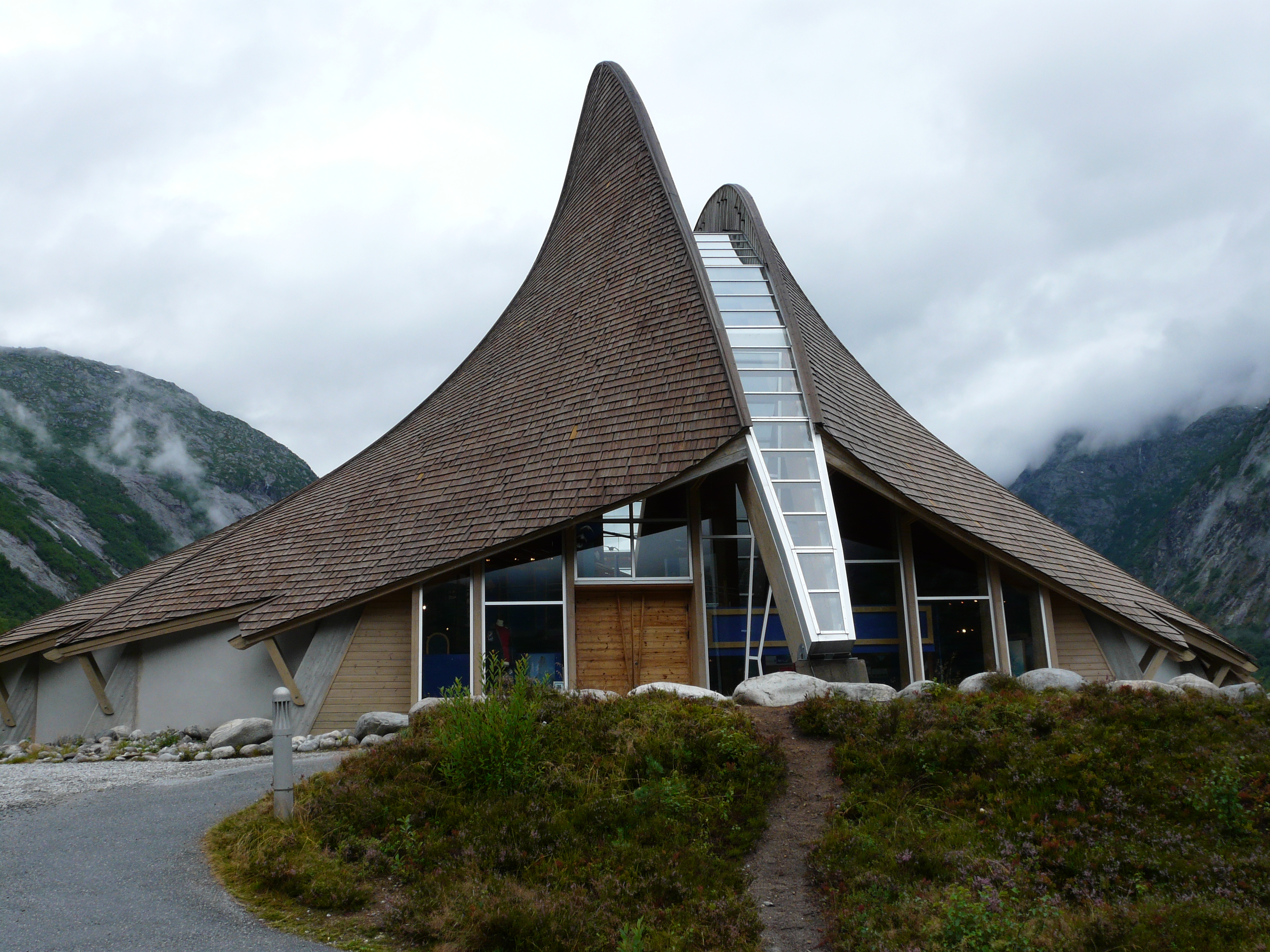
Breheimsenteret

The Breheimsenteret (lit. 'Breheim Center') is a museum and one of the three visitors centers for Jostedalsbreen National Park. Opened in 1993, it was located near the Jostedøla river in the village of Jostedal, about 20 kilometres (12 mi) north of Gaupne and about 10 kilometres (6.2 mi) east of the Jostedalsbreen glacier in Luster Municipality in Vestland county, Norway.

== History ==
The center was generally open from 1 May until 1 October. The center lay near to the glacier arm Nigardsbreen. The center contained a lot of information about the glacier and the Jostedal valley, which lies at the glacier's eastern edge. There is a 3-kilometre-long (1.9 mi) path to the lake Nigardsbrevatnet where a small boat takes tourists to the front of the Nigard glacier tongue. A bus leaves daily from Sogndalsfjøra to the Nigard glacier and stops at the site where the center lay. It is called the "glacier bus".

The glacial lakes Styggevatnet and Austdalsvatnet along with a glacier are located about 18 kilometres (11 mi) to the north, where it is possible to kayak with a guide.

In the evening of 28 July 2011, the building burned to the ground. The cause of the fire has not been determined. Plans have been made to rebuild the center by May 2013.

Monday 24 June 2013 the center was reopened by the Prime Minister of Norway, Jens Stoltenberg.

== Media gallery ==
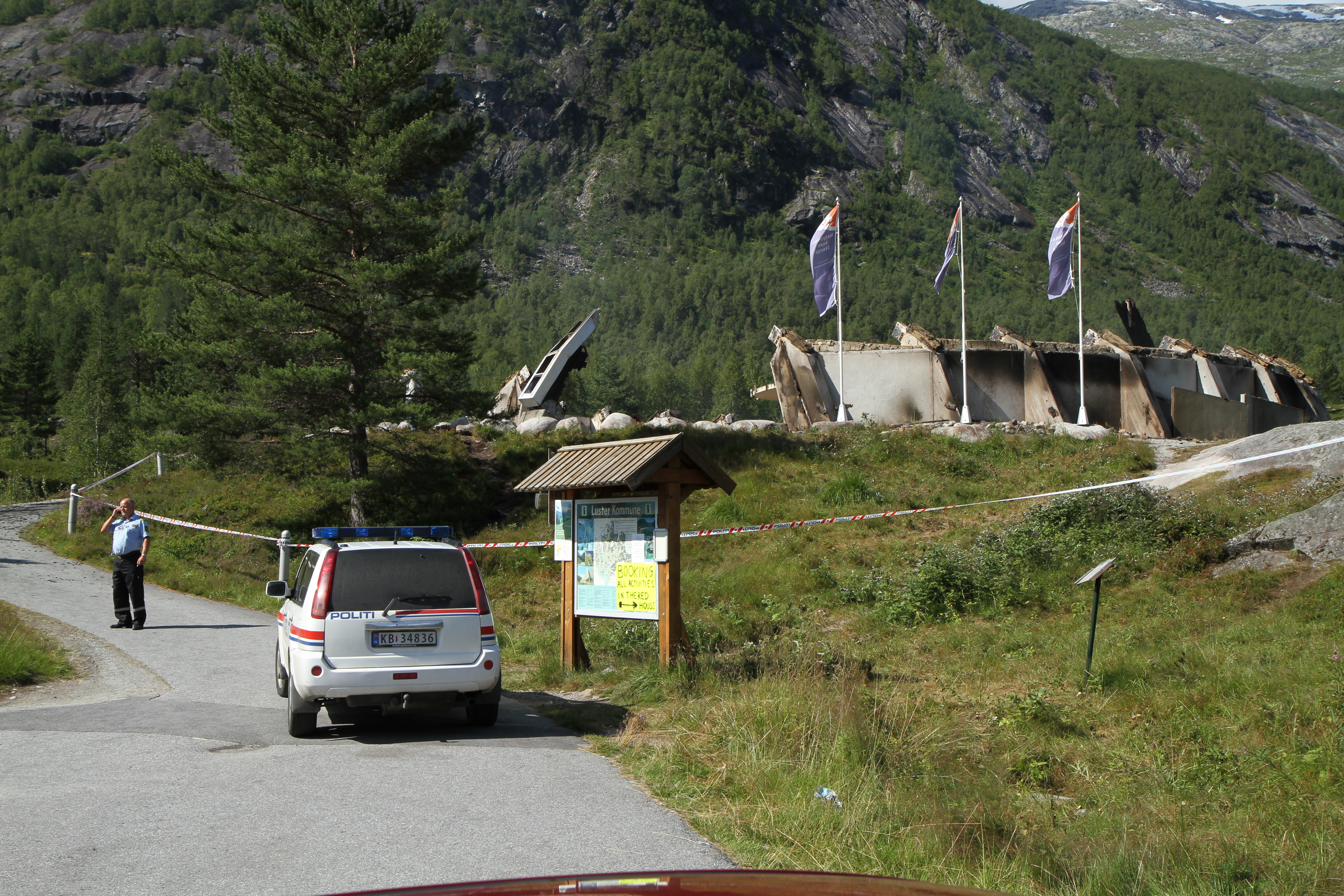
Breheimsenteret glacier center burned 2011

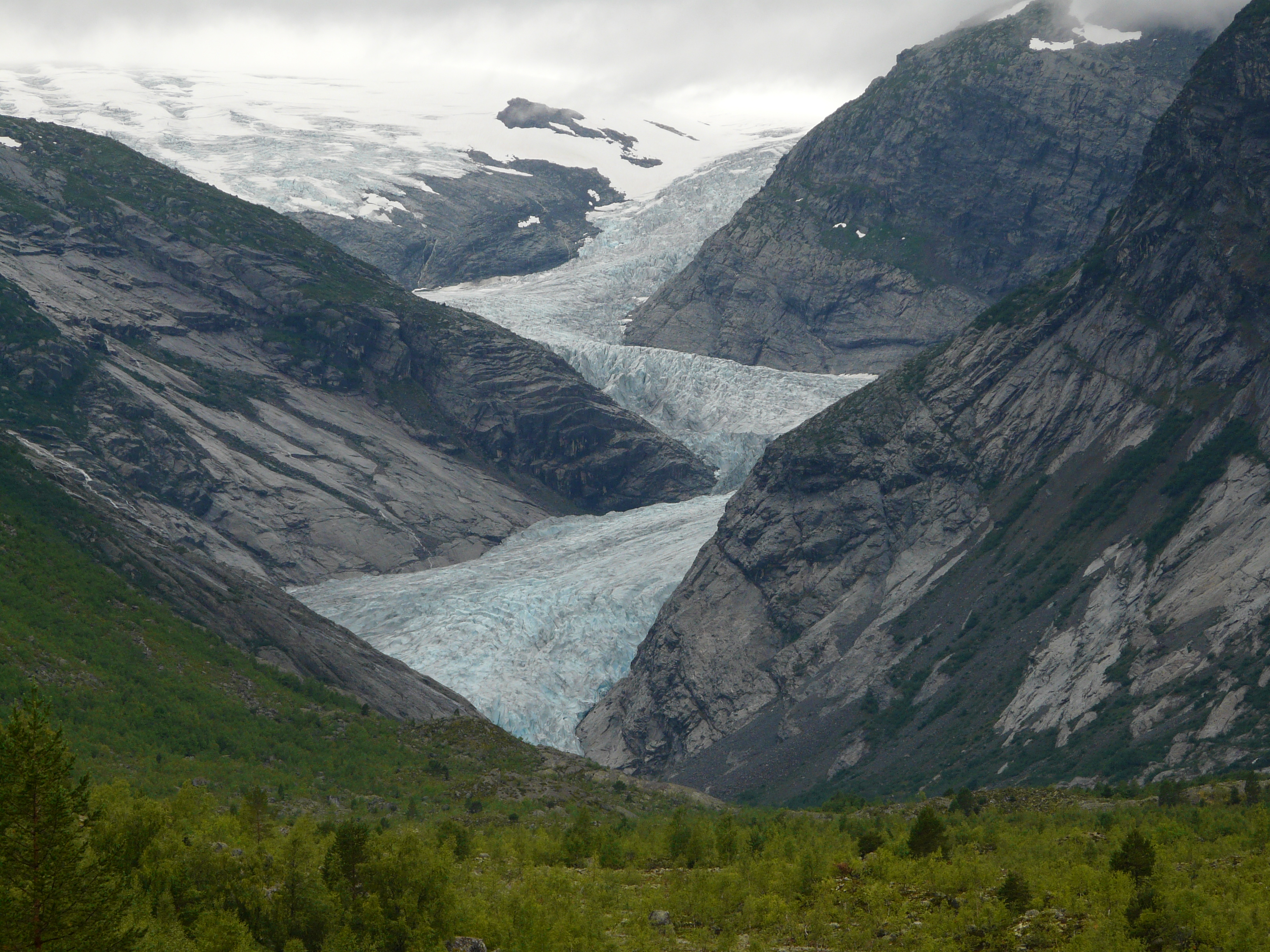
Jostedalsbreen from Breheimsenteret

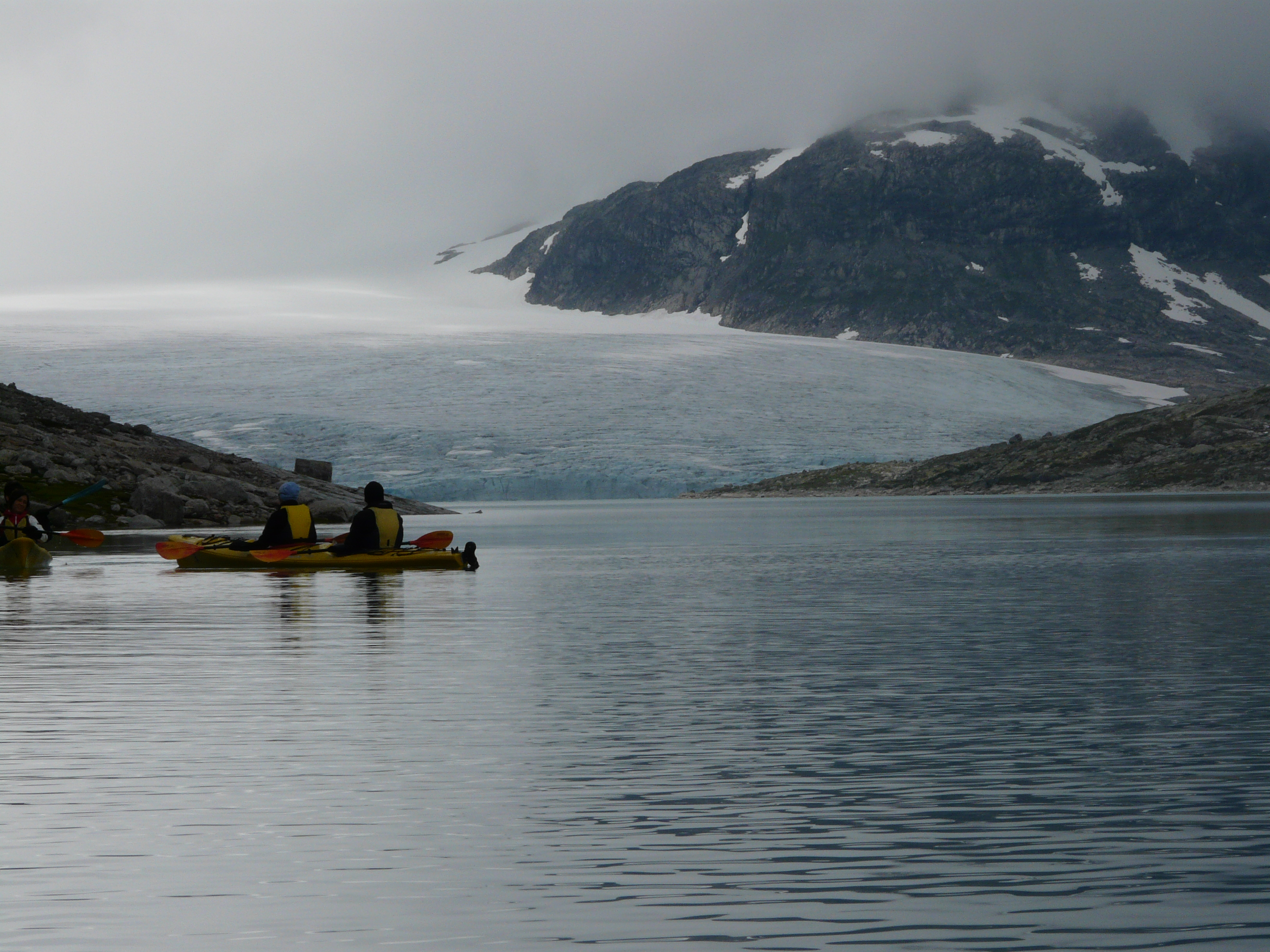
Glacier by lake Styggevatnet

== See also ==
- Jostedalsbreen nasjonalparksenter
