= Breheimen =

Mountain range in Norway

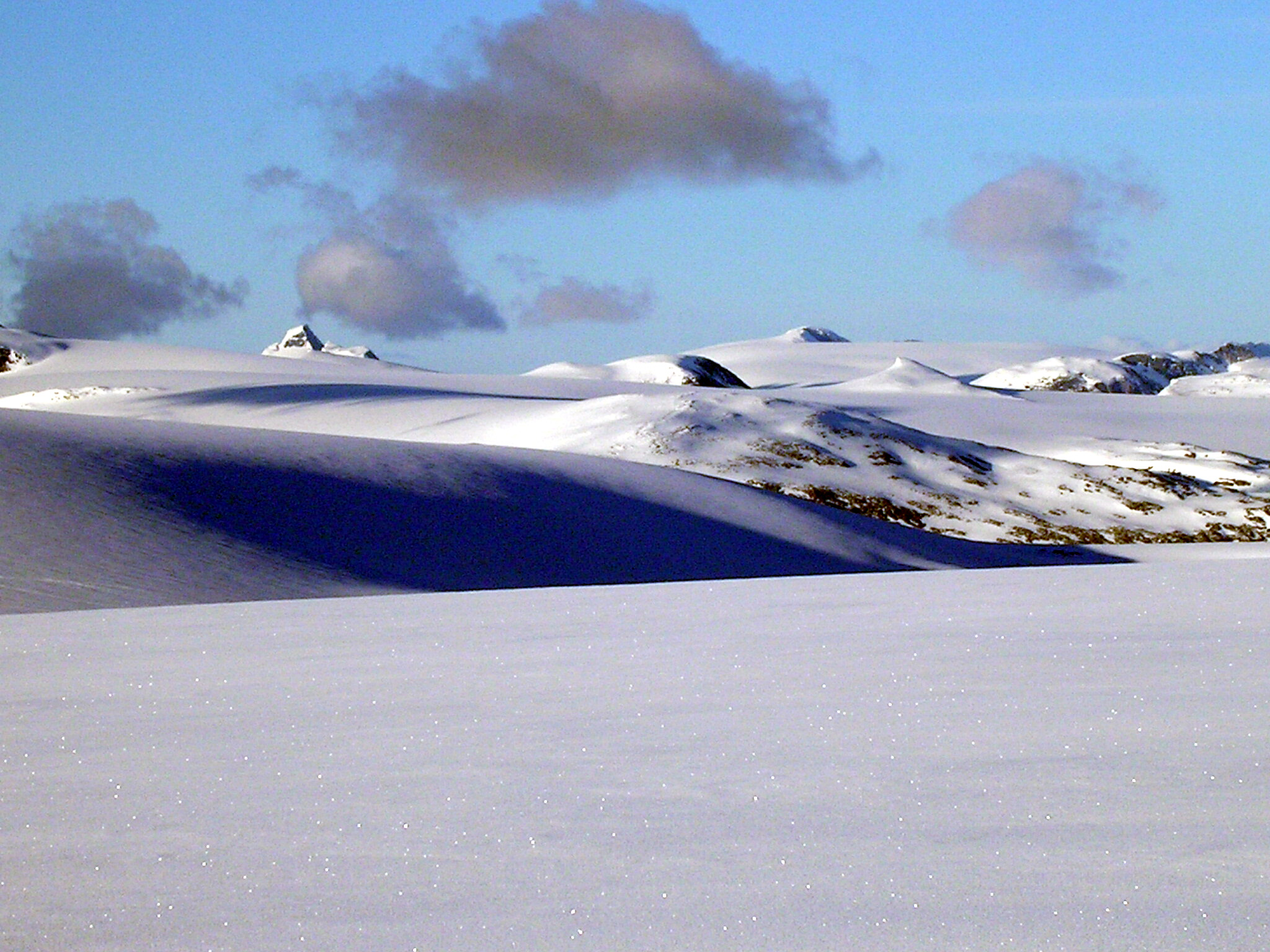
- Lodalskåpa (left) and Brenibba right, seen from Myklebustbreen

Highest point
- Peak: Hestbrepiggene, Skjåk Municipality, Innlandet
- Elevation: 2,172 m (7,126 ft)
- Coordinates: 61°44′31″N 08°06′32″E

Geography
- Location: Innlandet and Vestland, Norway
- National parks: Jostedalsbreen National Park and Breheimen National Park
- Range coordinates: 61.68938°N 7.65084°E

Breheimen is a mountain range in the Innlandet and Vestland counties in Norway. The area lies west of the Jotunheimen mountain range. The mountain range lies to the northwest of the Sognefjellsvegen road, north of the Sognefjorden, south of the Nordfjorden and Norwegian National Road 15, and east of Norwegian National Road 5 and European route E39. The mountain range includes Jostedalsbreen National Park and Breheimen National Park.

The name Breheimen means "home of the glaciers", since it has many glaciers, including Norway's largest glacier, Jostedalsbreen. Other glaciers in the range include Harbardsbreen and Spørteggbreen. Some of the major mountains in the area include Skåla, Lodalskåpa, Høgste Breakulen, Tverrådalskyrkja, Hestbrepiggene, and Brenibba. The region is home to several large lakes such as Austdalsvatnet and Styggevatnet.
