= Jostedalen =

Valley in Luster, Norway

- Jostedal
- Length: 60 kilometres (37 mi) North-South
- Width: 3 kilometres (1.9 mi)

Geology
- Type: River valley

Geography
- Location: Vestland, Norway
- Population centers: Gaupne
- Coordinates: 61.54169°N 7.26972°E
- River: Jostedøla

Location
- Interactive map of the valley

Jostedalen is a river valley in Luster Municipality in Vestland county, Norway. The 60-kilometre (37 mi) long valley runs from the Lustrafjorden at the village of Gaupne, to the north along the river Jostedøla and along the eastern side of the Jostedal Glacier. The valley is deep, but the valley floor lies over long stretches of flat river plains interrupted by steep steps. In the north, the landscape gets pretty wild. The Jostedalsbreen National Park surrounds the valley, which brings a lot of tourism to the area. The Nigardsbreen glacier is also accessible from the valley.

== History ==
From 1838 until 1963, most of the valley was part of the old Jostedal Municipality. On 1 January 1964, that municipality was merged into Luster Municipality.

=== Name ===
The Old Norse form of the name was probably Jǫstrudalr. The first element is then the genitive of Jastra (the old name of the river Jostedøla) and the last element is dalr which means "valley" or "dale". The river name is probably derived from jǫstr which means "yeast". The water in the river comes from glaciers, and in summer time the river gets "frothy" or "foamy" due to all of the melting ice and the many waterfalls.

== Transportation ==
The route through Jostedal, County Road 604, brings one directly to the foot of Nigardsbreen, a tongue of vast Jostedalsbreen glacier and the Breheimsenteret museum. There is also a bus connection to the glacier in summer.

The road through Jostedalen also offers some of the most magnificent views of the Norwegian fjord landscape with towering mountains and spectacular waterfalls. At the end of the road is the breath-taking sight of the blue ice at the mouth of the Nigardsbreen glacial tongue.

== Geography ==
The Jostedalen valley empties into the Gaupnefjord at the village of Gaupne. The Gaupnefjord is an arm of the Lustrafjorden, which is an arm of the famous Sognefjord, the second largest fjord in the world. There are three major glacial lakes in the area: Tunsbergdalsvatnet, Nigardsbrevatnet, and Styggevatnet (the suffix vatn is Norwegian for "lake"). The lake Austdalsvatnet is also located in the area.

The river Jostedøla runs through the valley up to its headwaters at the Jostedalsbreen glacier, a plateau glacier which is the European mainland's largest with an area of 480 square kilometres (190 sq mi). Jostedalsbreen National Park and Breheimen National Park are located on either side of the Jostedalen valley.

=== Farms of Jostedalen ===
Throughout history, when owners of Norwegian farms are no longer young enough to operate the farm, the title is either passed down to a younger family member or sold to a neighbour. Traditionally, the new operators of the farm assume the farm name as their new surname, and are often tasked with caring for the previous owners as part of the sale or transfer of title.

Most of the farms near in the Jostedal valley have been in operation for centuries:

- Bakken
- Bergset
- Bjørk
- Bruheim (Breum)
- Elvekrok
- Espe
- Fossen
- Fåberg nedre
- Fåberg øvre
- Grov
- Haugen
- Hellegård
- Jostedal prestegard
- Kjervik
- Kroken
- Lien
- Mjelvær
- Myklemyr
- Nedrelid
- Ormberg
- Snøtun
- Sperle
- Vamberg
- Yttri
- Åsen
