= Lodalskåpa =

Highest nunatak on the glacier Jostedalsbreen, Norway

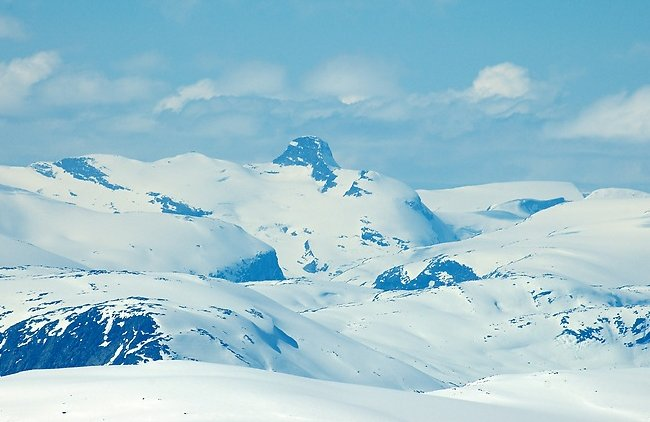
- Lodalskåpa seen from Fannaråki (south)

Highest point
- Elevation: 2,087 m (6,847 ft)
- Prominence: 806 m (2,644 ft)
- Parent peak: Galdhøpiggen
- Isolation: 25.9 km (16.1 mi) to Tverrådalskyrkja
- Coordinates: 61.79061°N 7.20465°E

Geography
- Interactive map of the mountain
- Location: Vestland, Norway
- Parent range: Breheimen
- Topo map: 1418 IV Lodalskåpa

Climbing
- First ascent: 1844: Gabriel Rustøy
- Easiest route: Glacier crossing and scrambling

Lodalskåpa is the highest nunatak on the Norwegian glacier Jostedalsbreen. It is located on the border between Stryn Municipality and Luster Municipality in Vestland county, Norway, within Jostedalsbreen National Park.

The 2,083-metre (6,834 ft) tall Lodalskåpa is located 3 kilometres (1.9 mi) north of Brenibba and 15 kilometres (9.3 mi) northeast of Høgste Breakulen mountain. The lakes Austdalsvatnet and Styggevatnet lie about 10 kilometres (6.2 mi) to the east.

The first ascent may have happened in 1820 by Gottfried Bohr. The easiest route to climb Lodalskåpa starts in the village of Bødalen in Stryn Municipality, then going up Brattebakken mountain to the Bohr glacier (Norwegian: Bohrsbreen). Around the southern summit to the col, then scrambling to the main summit, approximately one rope length.

== Name ==
The first element is the genitive case of the name of the valley Lodalen, the last element is the finite form of kåpe which means "coat" (here used metaphorically about the glacier surrounding the top–see also Snøhetta). The name of the valley is a compound of ló which means "meadow" and the finite form of dal which means "dale" or "valley".

== Media gallery ==
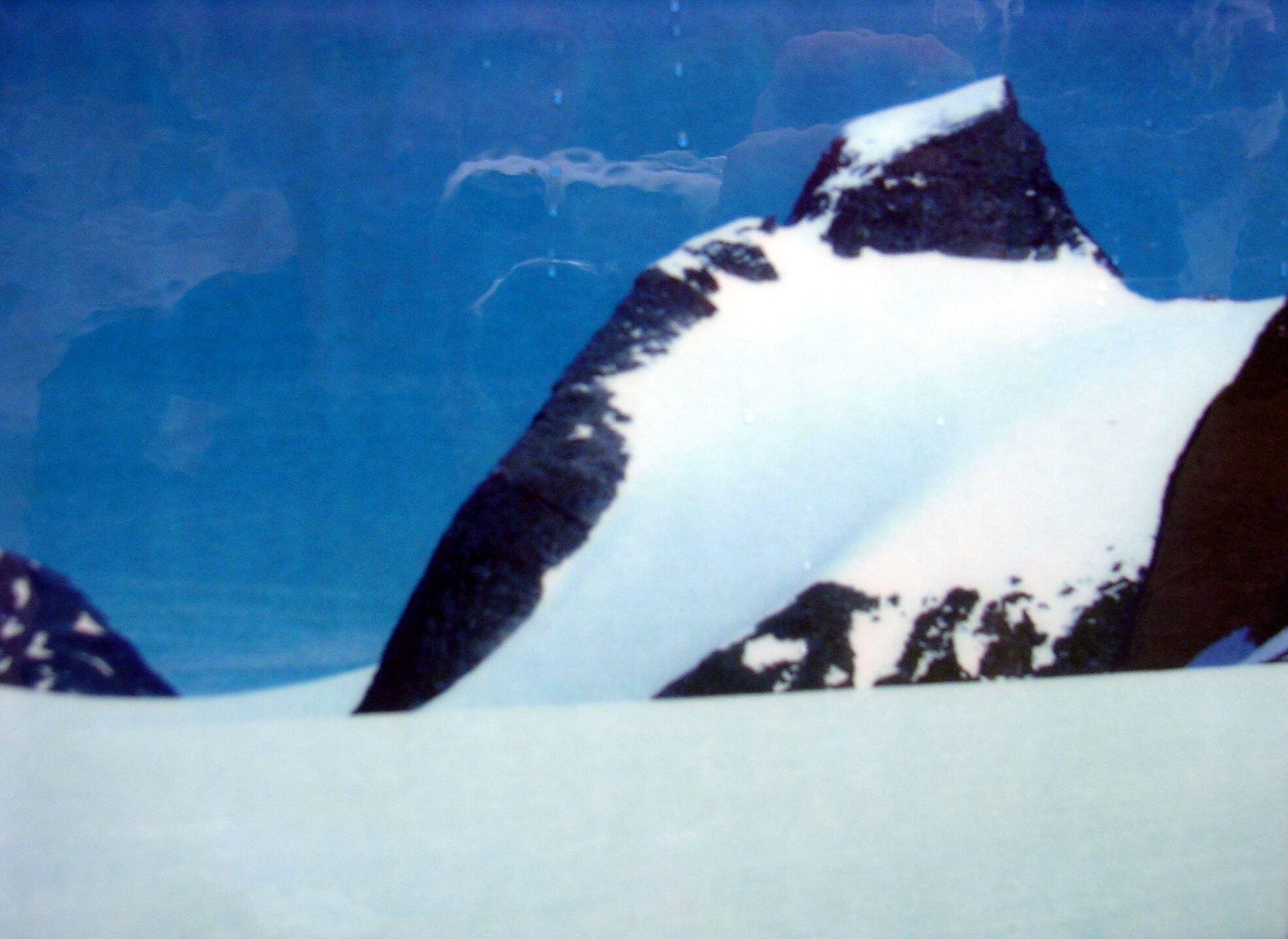
Summit seen from Bohr glacier

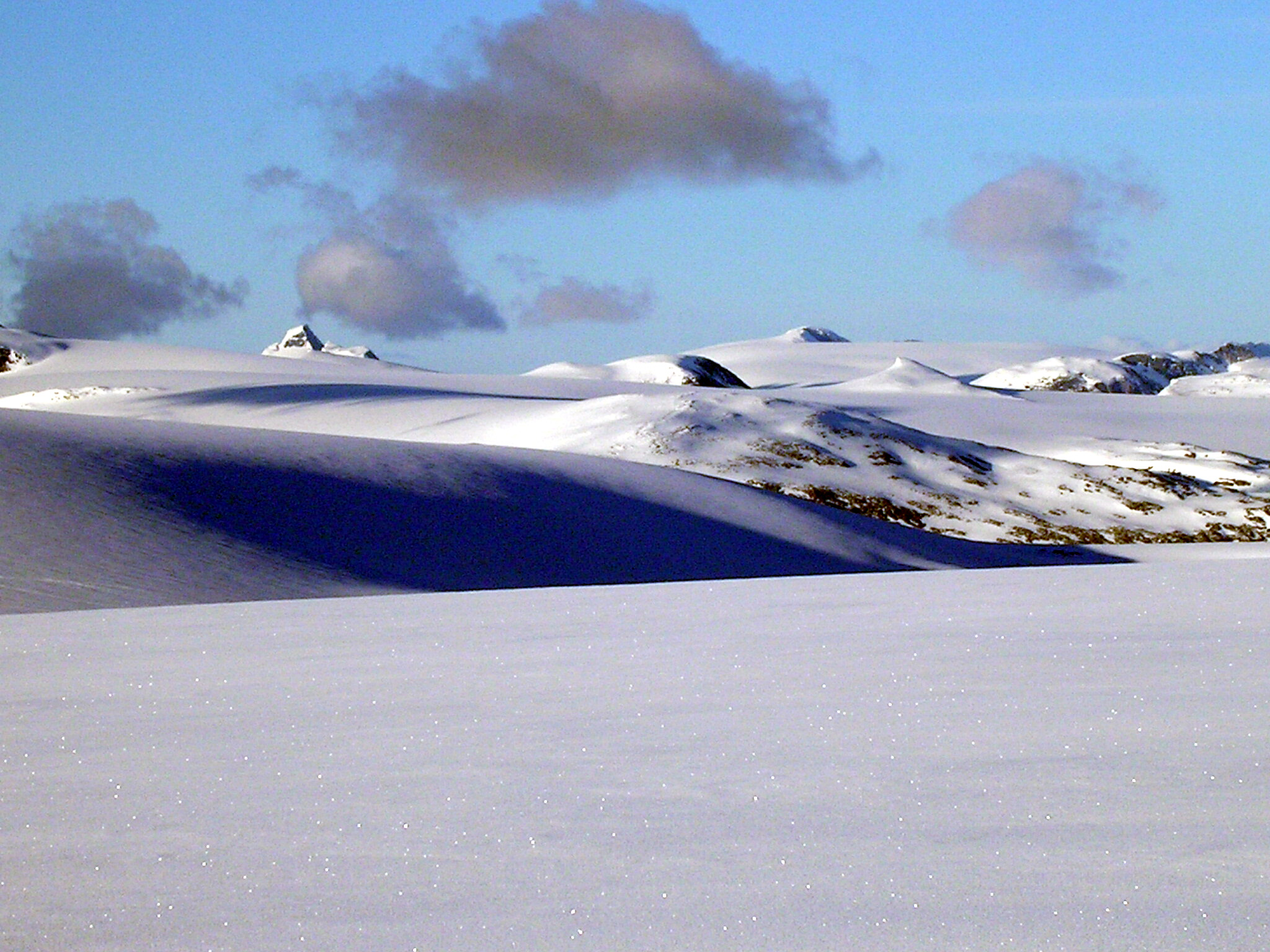
Lodalskåpa (in the left) seen from Myklebustbreen in the west.

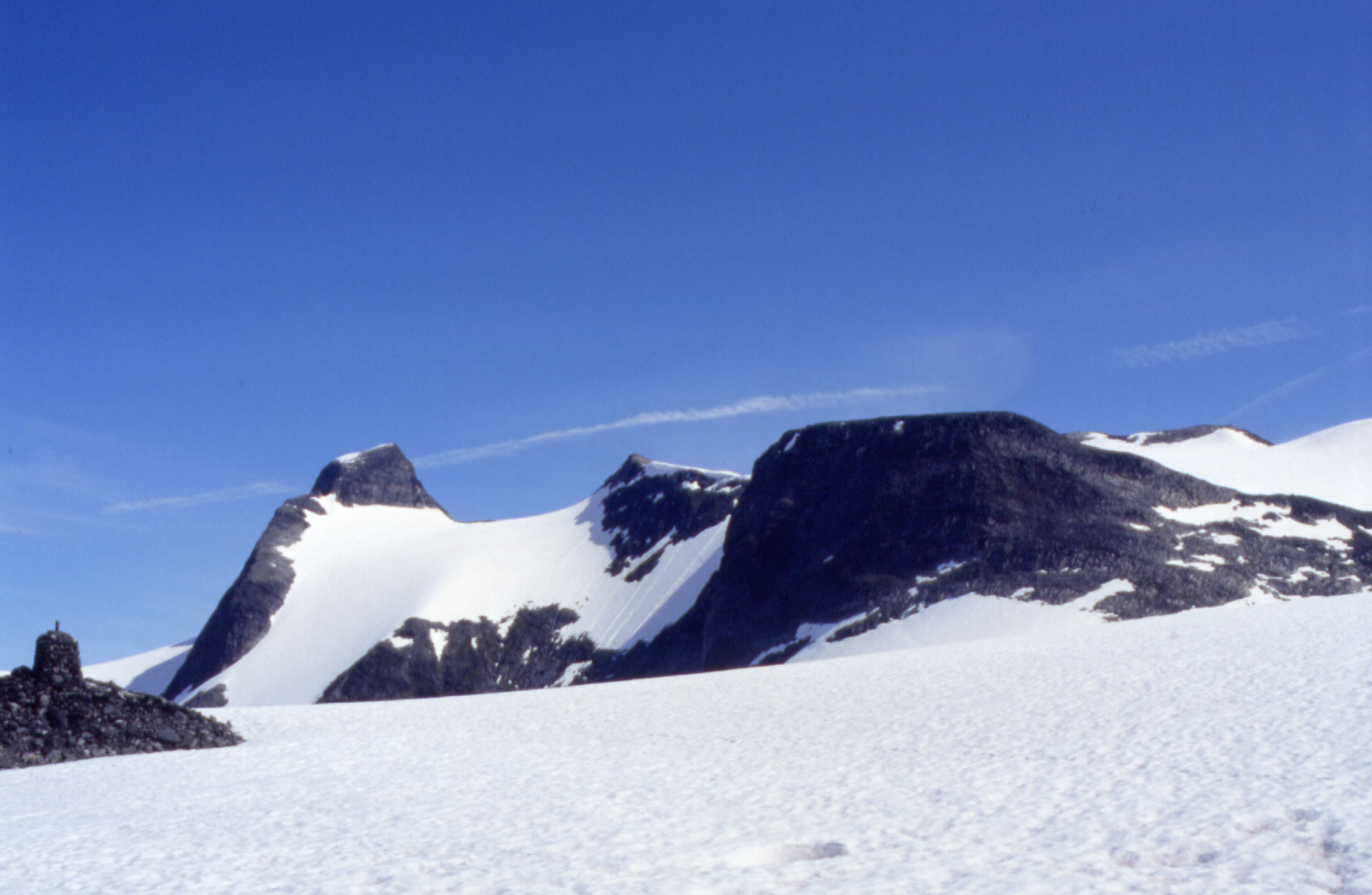
Seen from west
