= Snønipa =

Mountain in Vestland, Norway

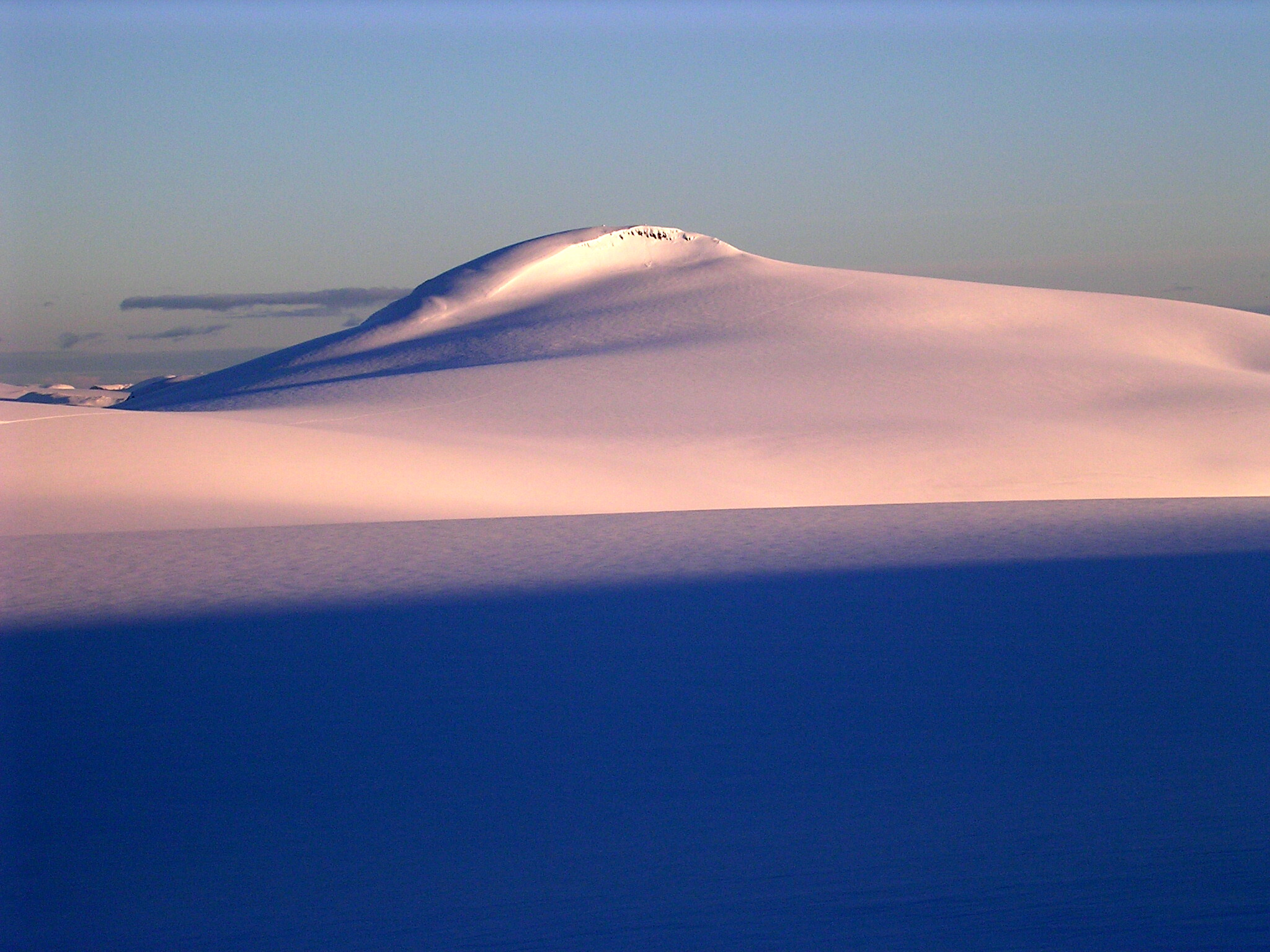
- Snønipa, seen from the glacier Myklebustbreen

Highest point
- Elevation: 1,827 m (5,994 ft)
- Prominence: 739 m (2,425 ft)
- Isolation: 12.2 km (7.6 mi)
- Coordinates: 61°40′41″N 6°41′26″E

Geography
- Interactive map of the mountain
- Location: Vestland, Norway
- Parent range: Breheimen

Snønipa is a mountain in Vestland county, Norway. The 1,827-metre (5,994 ft) tall mountain lies on the border of Sunnfjord Municipality and Gloppen Municipality. It forms a nunatak of the Myklebustbreen glacier.
