= Egge, Vestland =

Village in Gloppen Municipality, Norway

Egge
- Village
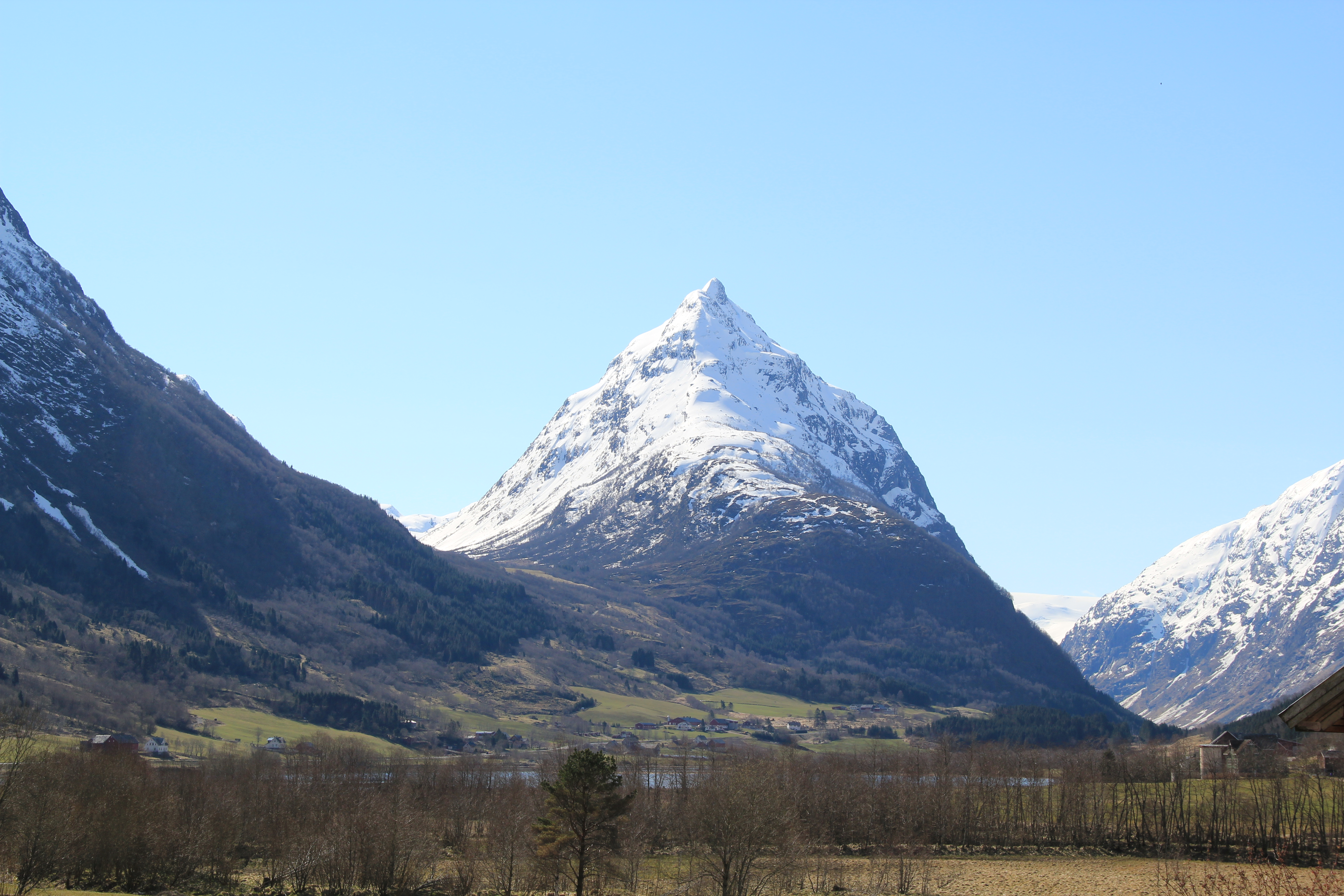
- The village is located at the right base of the mountain Eggenipa
- Interactive map of Egge
- Location within Vestland Location within Norway
- Coordinates: 61.68631°N 6.52077°E
- Country: Norway
- Region: Western Norway
- County: Sogn og Fjordane
- District: Nordfjord
- Municipality: Gloppen Municipality
- Elevation: 165 m (541 ft)
- Time zone: UTC+01:00 (CET)
  - Summer (DST): UTC+02:00 (CEST)
- Post Code: 6826 Byrkjelo

Egge is a village in Gloppen Municipality in Vestland county, Norway. It is located along the European route E39 highway, about 5 kilometres (3.1 mi) south of the village of Byrkjelo, and about 7 kilometres (4.3 mi) west of Jostedalsbreen National Park where the Myklebustbreen glacier is located. Egge is 21 kilometres (13 mi) southeast of the municipal center of Sandane, and it is also about 13 kilometres (8.1 mi) north of Skei, a village in the neighboring Sunnfjord Municipality. The village sits at the base of the mountain Eggenipa.
