= Gaupne =

Village in Luster Municipality, Norway

- Village
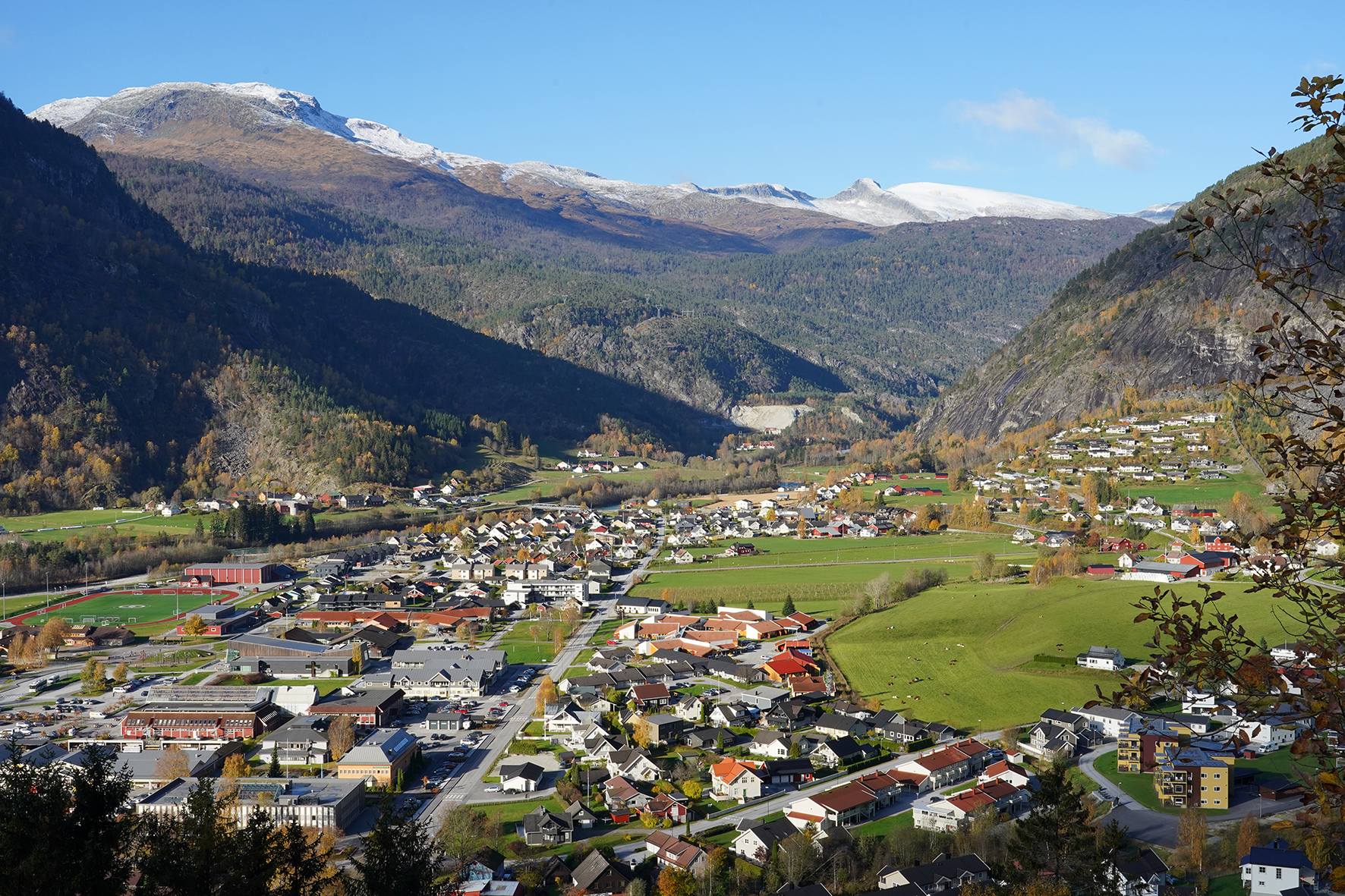
- Interactive map of Gaupne
- Location within Vestland Location within Norway
- Coordinates: 61.40472°N 7.29458°E
- Country: Norway
- Region: Western Norway
- County: Vestland
- District: Sogn
- Municipality: Luster Municipality

Area
  - Total: 1.5 km^{2} (0.58 sq mi)
- Elevation: 2 m (6.6 ft)

Population (2025)
  - Total: 1,294
  - Density: 863/km^{2} (2,240/sq mi)
- Time zone: UTC+01:00 (CET)
  - Summer (DST): UTC+02:00 (CEST)
- Post Code: 6868 Gaupne

Gaupne is the administrative center of Luster Municipality in Vestland county, Norway. The village is located along the Gaupnefjorden, an arm of the Lustrafjorden, about 10 kilometres (6.2 mi) north of the village of Hafslo. The village of Veitastrond is located across the mountains 20 kilometres (12 mi) to the northwest. The Sognefjellsvegen road passes through here on its way to the village of Skjolden and beyond.

The 1.5-square-kilometre (370-acre) village has a population (2025) of 1,294 and a population density of 863 inhabitants per square kilometre (2,240/sq mi).

Gaupne sits at the southern end of the Jostedalen valley, with the river Jostedøla's mouth located in Gaupne. It sits southwest of the Jostedalsbreen glacier, between Jostedalsbreen National Park and Breheimen National Park. The village is about 40 kilometres (25 mi) south of the famous Nigardsbreen glacier, and the Breheimsenteret museum is located about 25 kilometres (16 mi) to the north of Gaupne in the village of Jostedal.

There are two churches in Gaupne: the historic Old Gaupne Church and the newer Gaupne Church.

== Economy ==
The village is home to several industries including tourism, printing, cement manufacturing, and apparel manufacturing. The nearby Leirdøla power plant is located just north of the village. Also, Statkraft's administration for Central Norway is based here. The village is known as "Etikettbygda"

== Notable residents ==
- Kåre Øvregard, a former member of the Parliament of Norway (Storting)

== Gallery ==
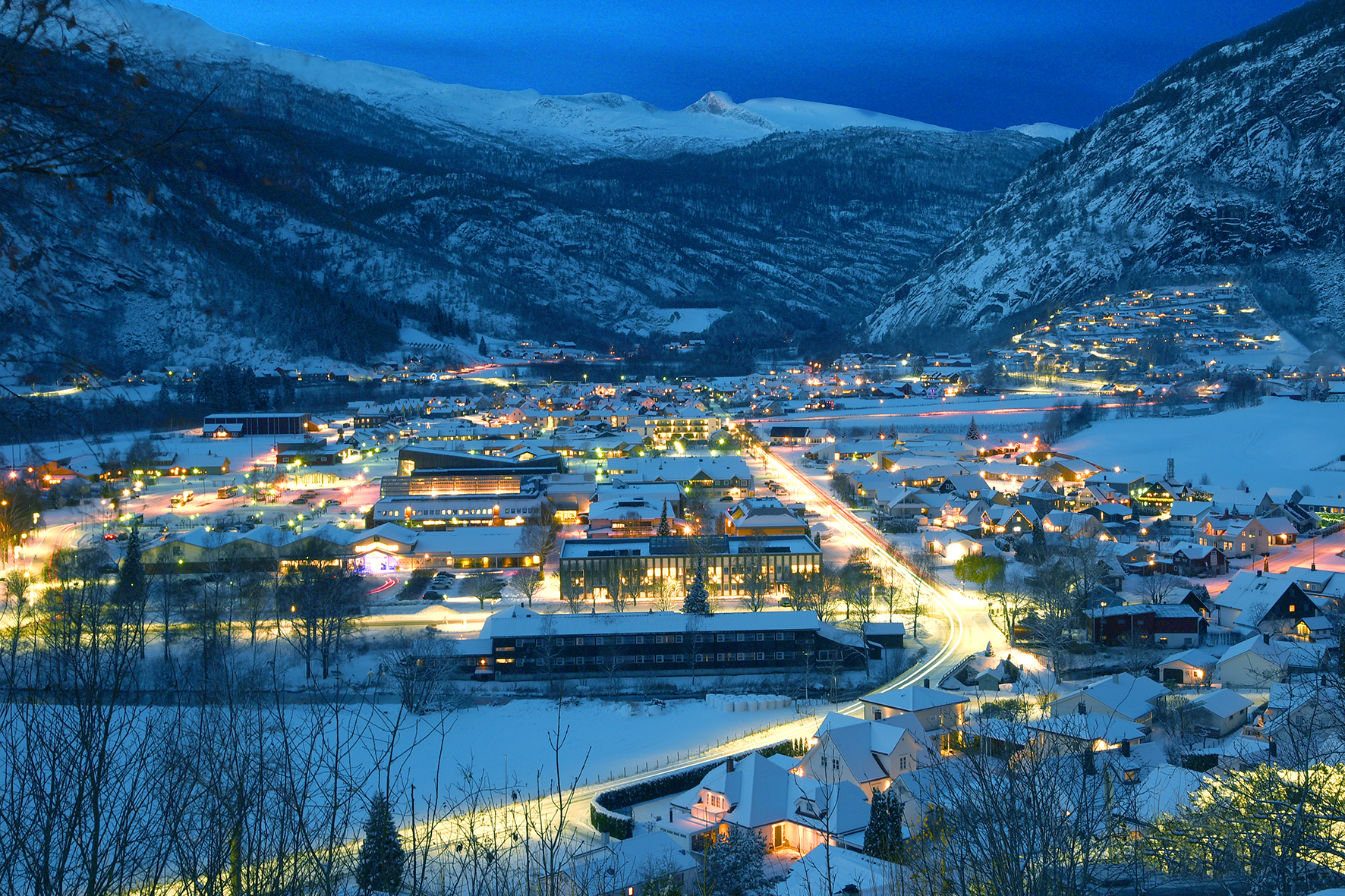
Gaupne, november 2025. Photo by Vadim Chuprina

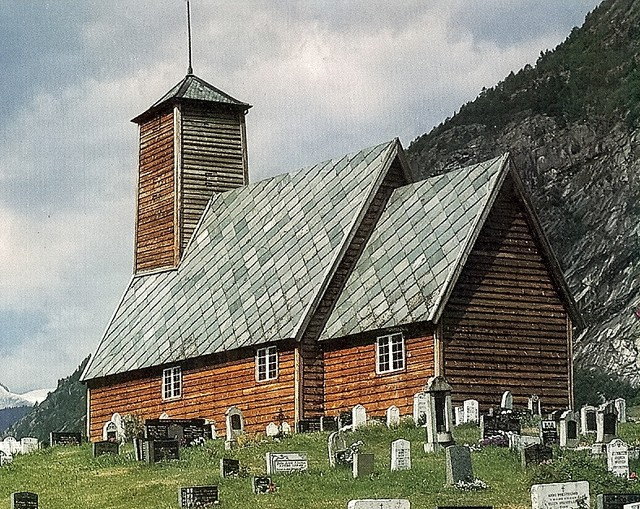
Old Gaupne Church
