= Høgste Breakulen =

Mountain in Vestland, Norway

- Interactive map of the mountain

Highest point
- Elevation: 1,957 m (6,421 ft)
- Prominence: 287 m (942 ft)
- Parent peak: Lodalskåpa
- Isolation: 0.039 km (0.024 mi)
- Coordinates: 61.68136°N 7.03262°E

Geography
- Location: Vestland, Norway
- Parent range: Breheimen
- Topo map: 1418 IV Lodalskåpa

Climbing
- Easiest route: Glacier crossing

Høgste Breakulen is the highest point on the Norwegian glacier Jostedalsbreen. It is inside the Jostedalsbreen National Park on the border of Stryn Municipality and Luster Municipality in Vestland county, Norway. Lodalskåpa, a nunatak 15 kilometres (9.3 mi) to the northwest, and Brenibba, another nunatak that is 12 kilometres (7.5 mi) to the northwest, are both higher than Høgste Breakulen, but they are not covered by the glacier.

== See also ==
- List of mountains of Norway
