= Brenibba =

Mountain in Luster, Norway

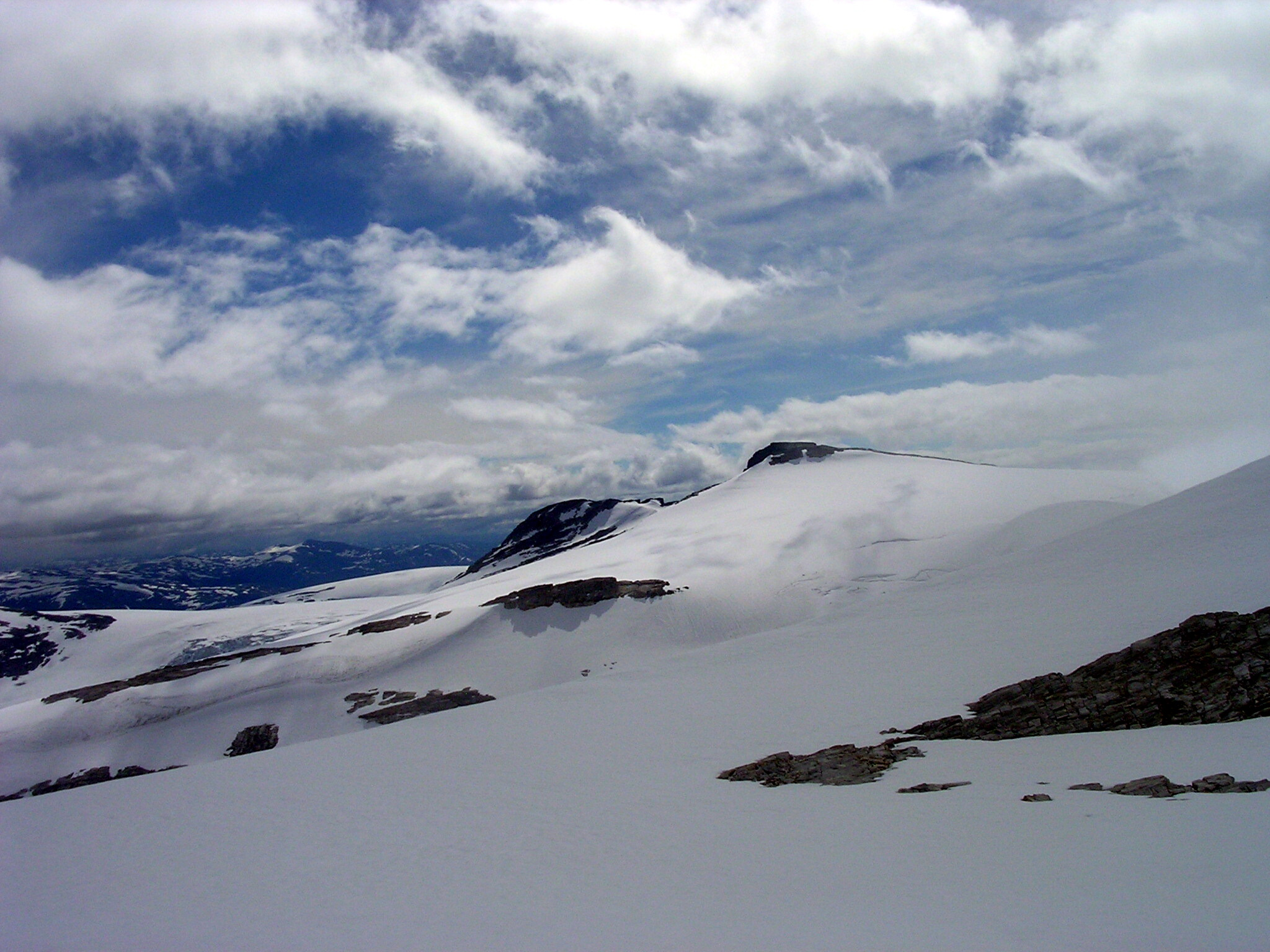
- Seen from north, under Veslekåpa

Highest point
- Elevation: 2,017 m (6,617 ft)
- Prominence: 293 m (961 ft)
- Parent peak: Lodalskåpa
- Isolation: 3 km (1.9 mi) to Lodalskåpa
- Coordinates: 61°45′52″N 7°11′40″E

Geography
- Location: Vestland, Norway
- Parent range: Breheimen
- Topo map: 1418 IV Lodalskåpa

Brenibba is a nunatak protruding from the north end of the Jostedalsbreen glacier in the Breheimen mountain range. It is located in Luster Municipality in Vestland county, Norway. Brenibba is located 2.5 kilometres (1.6 mi) south of Lodalskåpa and 12 kilometres (7.5 mi) northeast of Høgste Breakulen. The mountain lies within Jostedalsbreen National Park. The lakes Austdalsvatnet and Styggevatnet are located 11 kilometres (6.8 mi) west of Brenibba.

== Name ==
The first element is bre which means "glacier" and the last element is the finite form of nibbe which means "mountain peak".
