= Nigardsbreen =

Glacier in Vestland, Norway

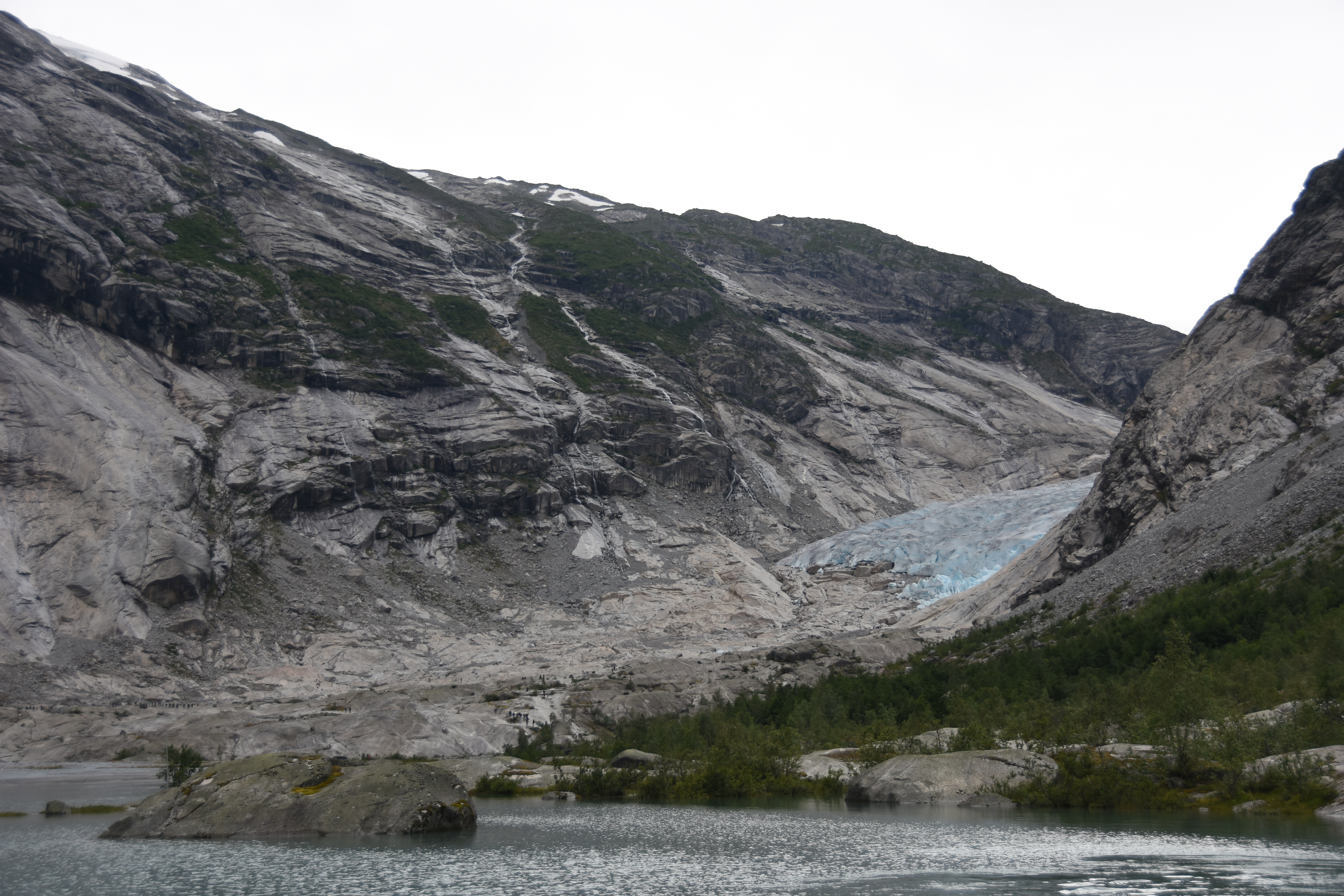
- Interactive map of Nigardsbreen
- Type: Valley glacier
- Location: Vestland, Norway
- Coordinates: 61.69241°N 7.18168°E
- Area: 48 km^{2} (19 sq mi)

Nigardsbreen (lit. 'the Nigard Glacier') is a glacier arm of the large Jostedalsbreen glacier. Nigardsbreen lies about 30 kilometres (19 mi) north of the village of Gaupne in the Jostedalen valley in Luster Municipality in Vestland county, Norway. It is located just west of the Jostedøla river.

The Breheimsenteret museum is located 11 kilometres (6.8 mi) south in the village of Jostedal. In front of the Nigardsbreen glacier is the lake Nigardsbrevatnet where there is a small boat to transport visitors to the glacier. There is also a bus to take visitors to the glacier.

== History ==
During the first half of the 18th century, the glacier expanded due to cold weather. Then, the winters of 1741-1744 were extremely cold. Apples and pears did not ripen during the summer and the bee populations perished. Between 1700 and 1748, the glacier moved forward about 4 kilometres (2.5 mi) completely covering and crushing nine farms (Danish: Ni gårde) (hence the name of the glacier). By 1748, the Nigardsbreen covered about 48 square kilometres (19 sq mi). From 1930 until 1939, the glacier retracted again.

=== Safety ===
Nigardbreen has seen several severe accidents. In July 1986 two people, a Danish woman and her 8-year-old daughter, died when hit by chunks of ice that fell from the glacier. In 1994 a Polish woman was left in critical condition after being hit by falling ice. In 2014 a German couple died as a result of being crushed by ice; their children standing close by survived physically unharmed. In August 2018 an Austrian man drowned when a wave caused by a huge block of ice swept him into the glacial river.

== Media gallery ==
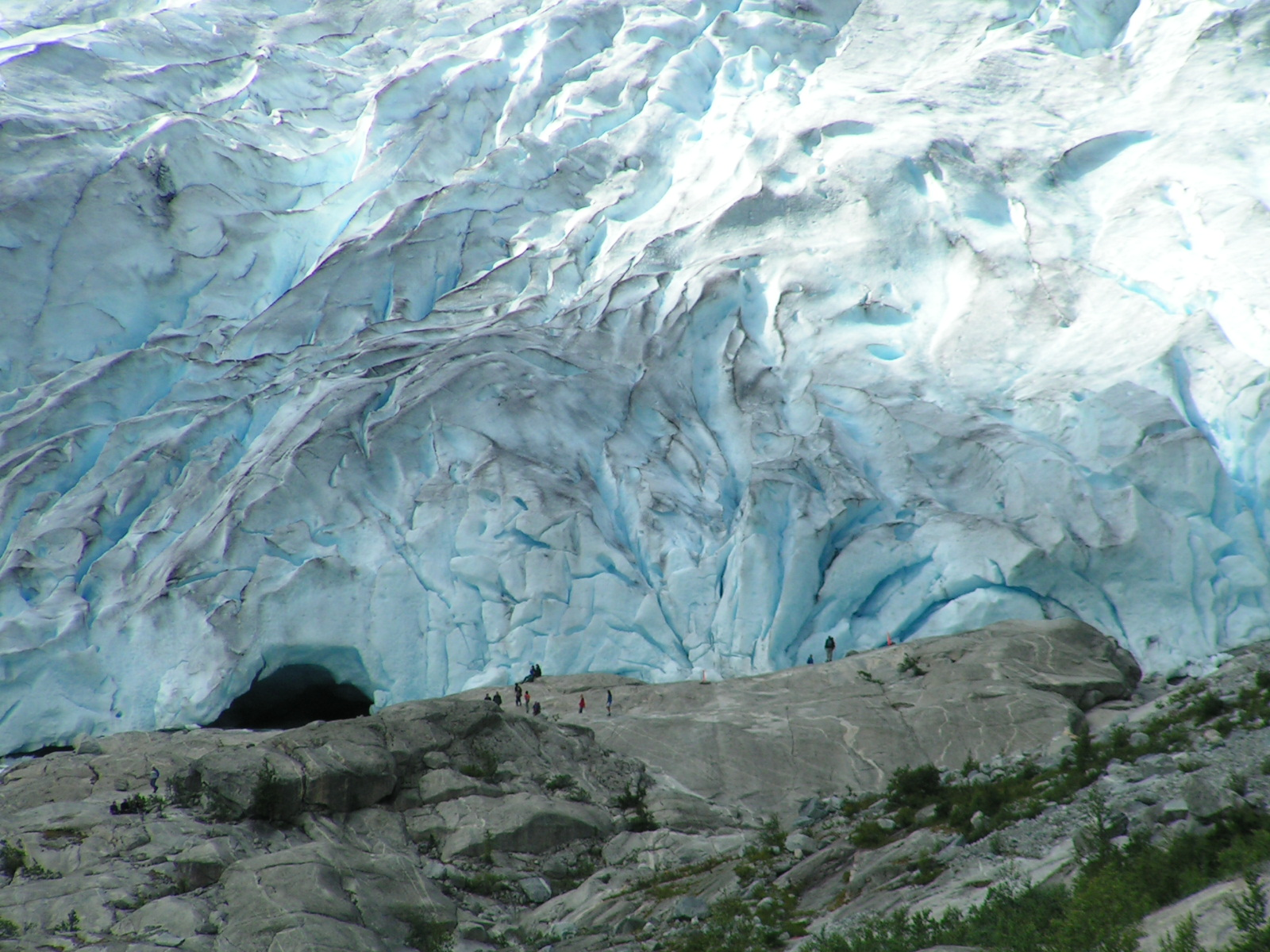
Detail Nigardsbreen

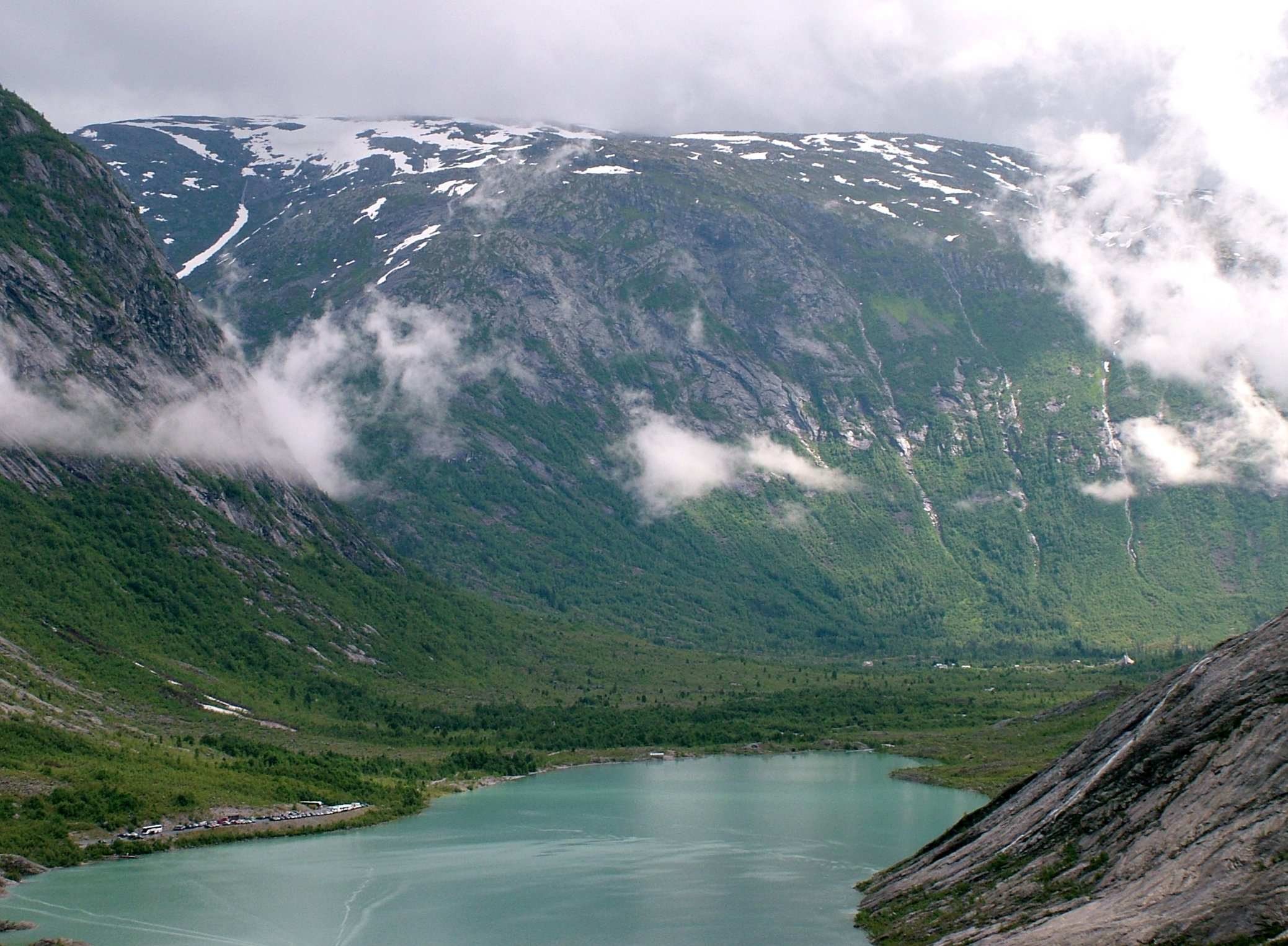
View on Nigardsbrevassnet from the glacier

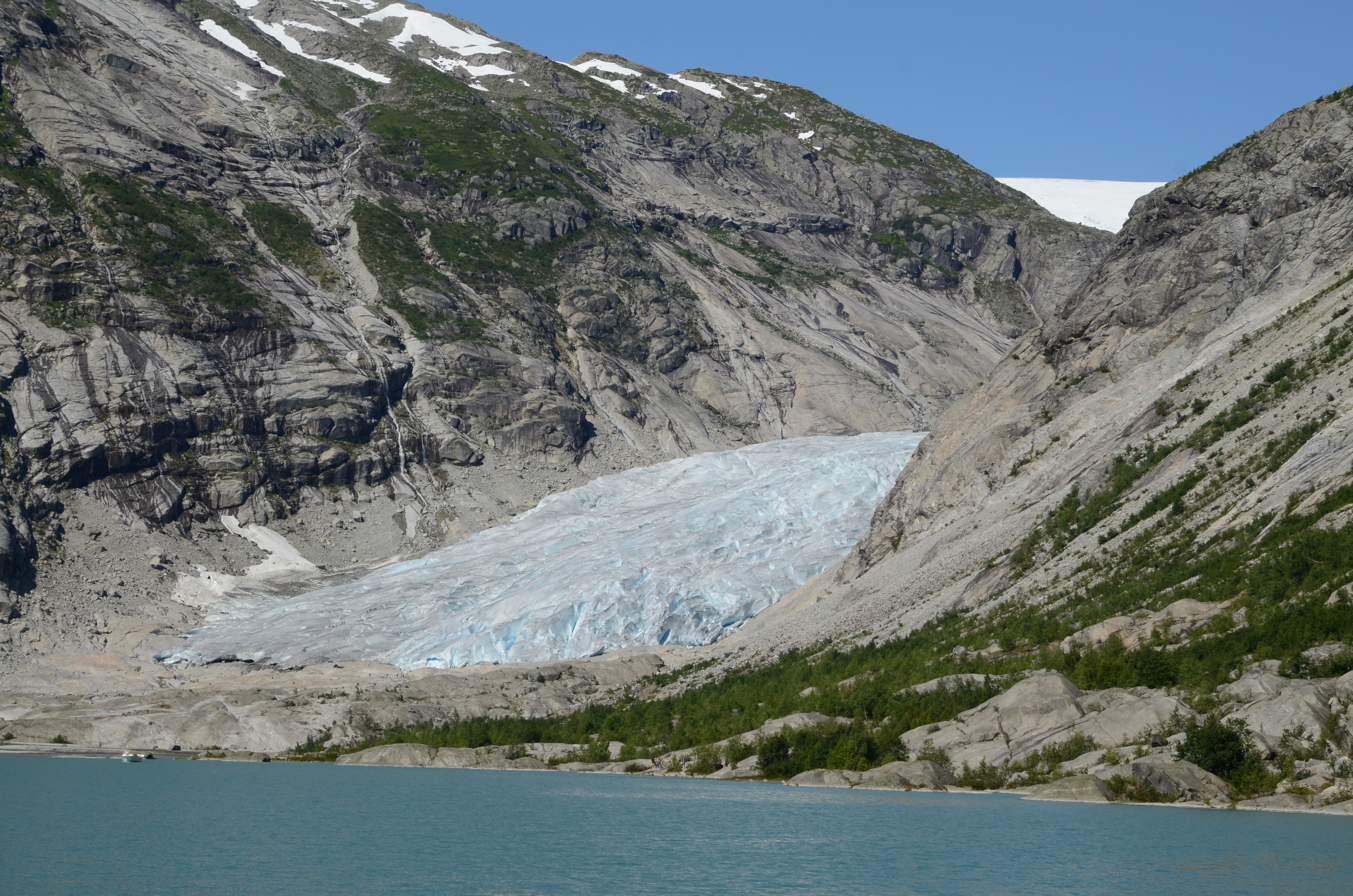
Nigardsbreen in July 2012

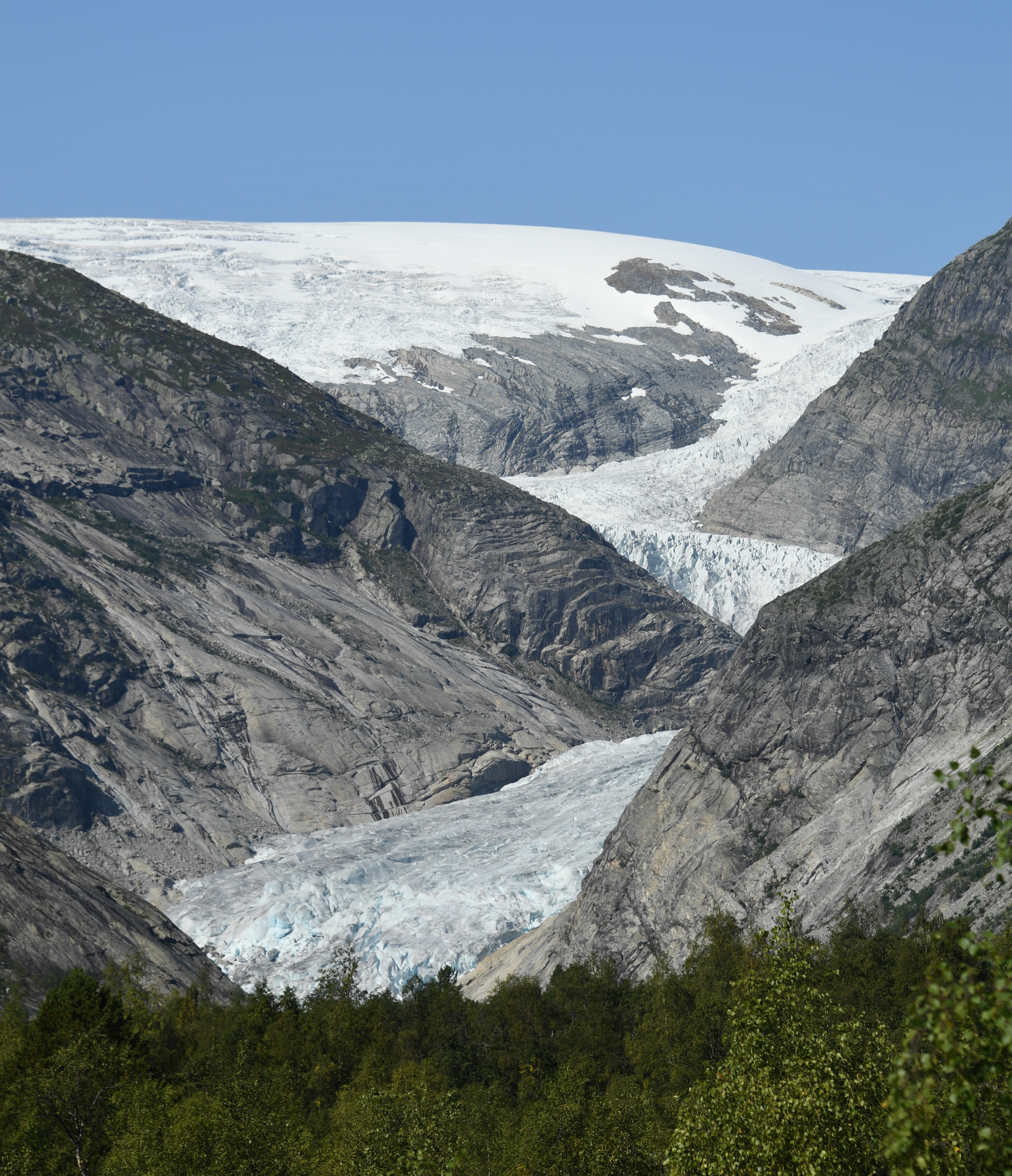
Overall view of the glacier (2017)

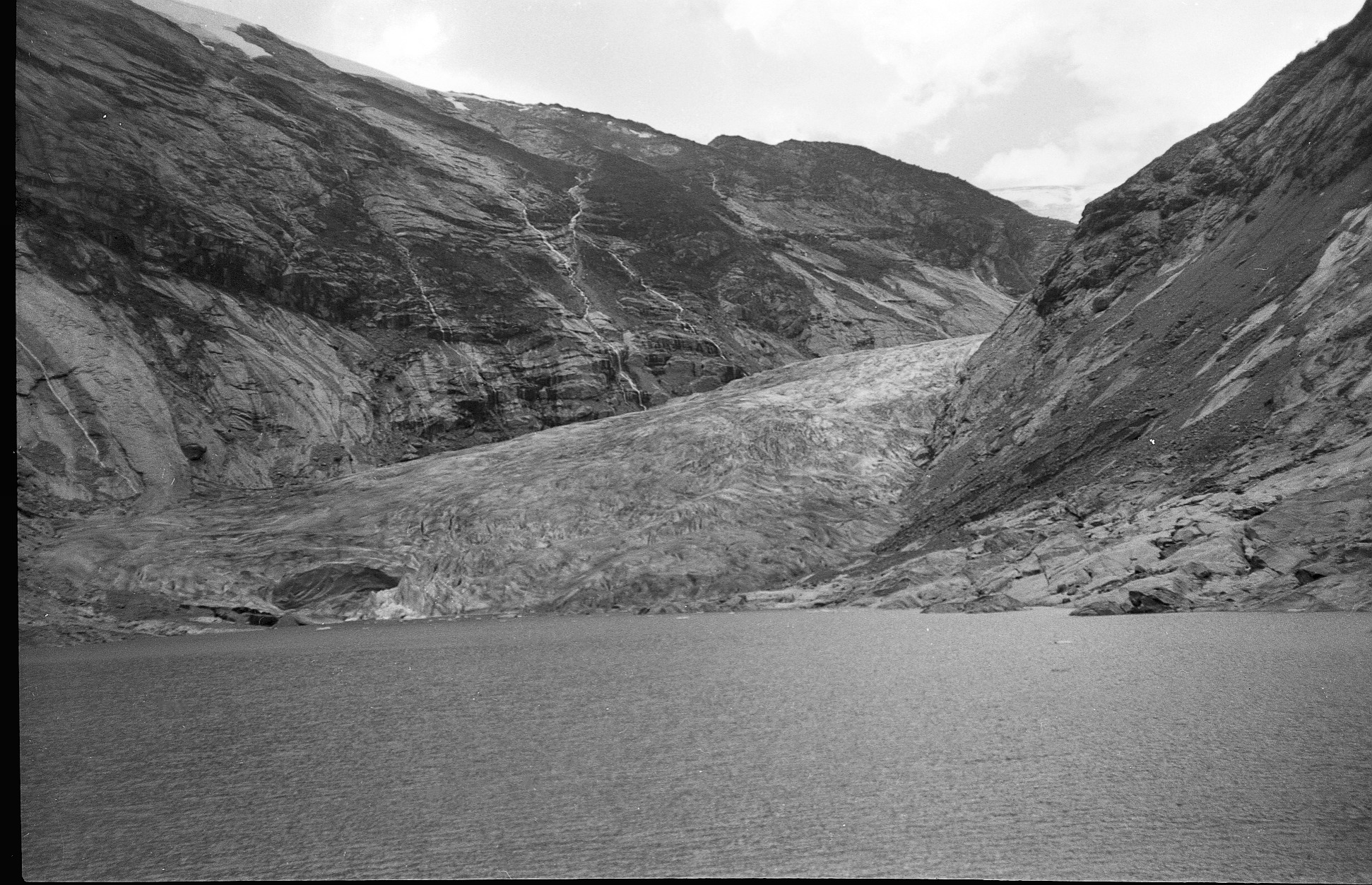
Nigardsbreen summer 1962

== See also ==
- List of glaciers in Norway
