= Styggevatnet =

Lake in Vestland, Norway

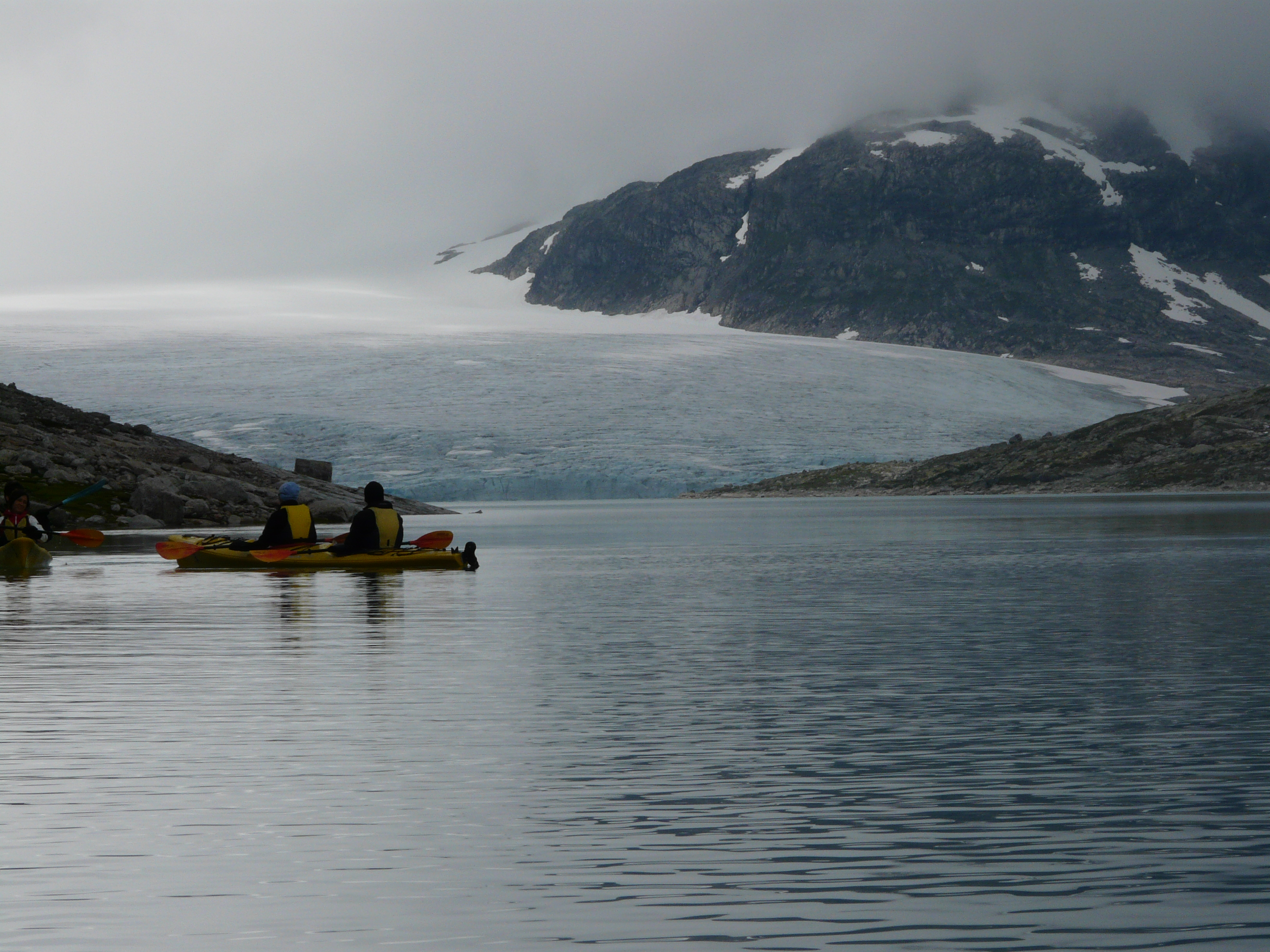
- Glacier by glacier lake Styggevatnet
- Interactive map of Styggevatnet
- Location: Luster Municipality, Vestland
- Coordinates: 61°46′22″N 07°27′06″E
- Type: Glacial lake
- Primary inflows: Austdalsvatnet
- Primary outflows: Jostedøla river
- Basin countries: Norway
- Surface elevation: 1,156 m (3,793 ft)
- References: NVE

Styggevatnet is a glacial lake from the glacier Jostedalsbreen in Luster Municipality in Vestland county, Norway. The lake is regulated by a dam and it empties into the river Jostedøla. The lake originally was located immediately to the southeast of the lake Austdalsvatnet, but after the construction of the dam, the two lakes have grown together as the water level rose. The lake is about 10 kilometres (6.2 mi) to the east of Lodalskåpa and Brenibba in Jostedalsbreen National Park.

Styggevatnet lies about 18 kilometres (11 mi) from the Breheimsenteret information center, where one can learn about the glacier Nigardsbreen. In the lake, it is possible to kayak with a guide between the ice rocks to a nearby glacier.

== Media gallery ==
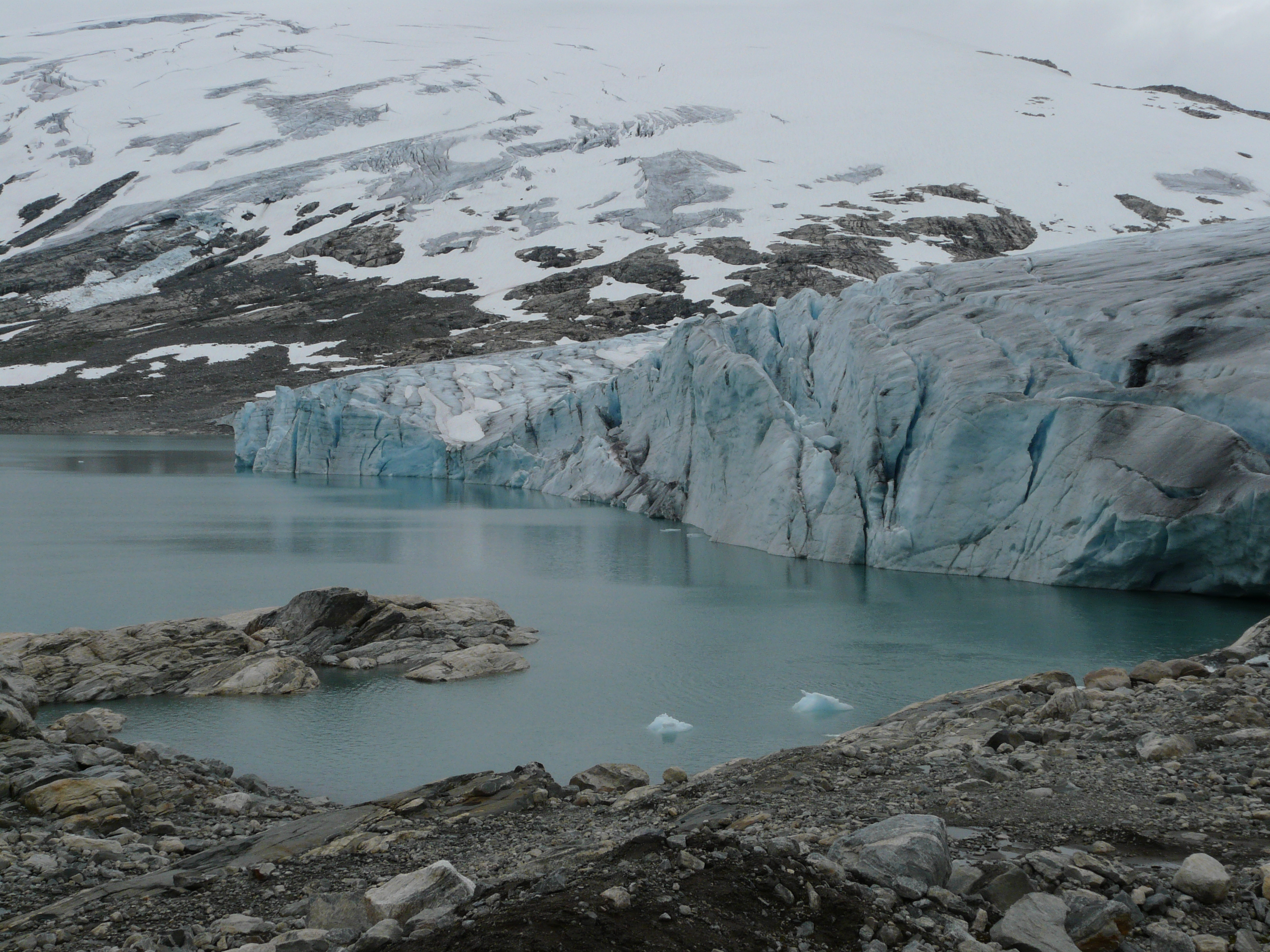
View of the glacier

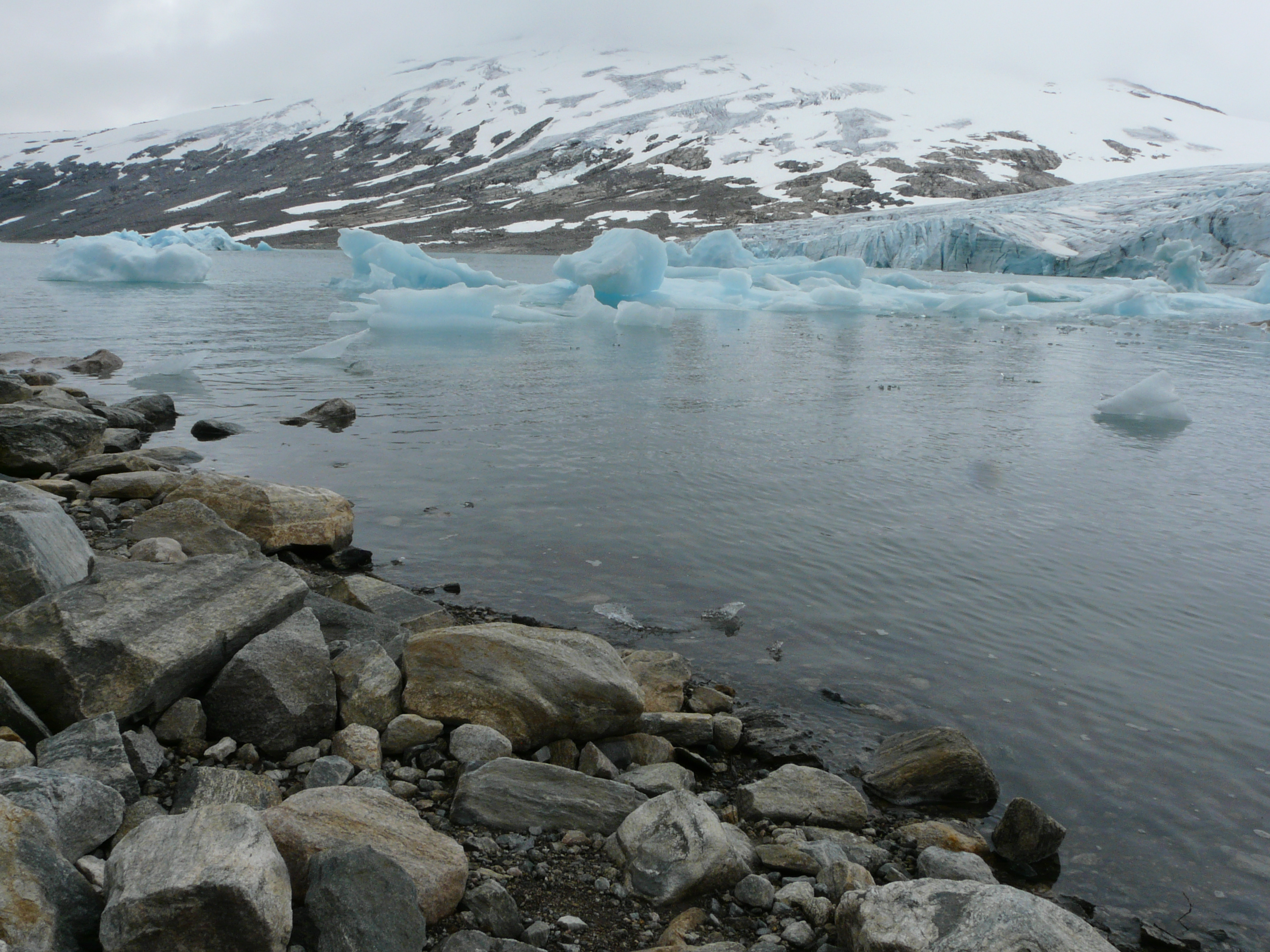
Lake Styggevatnet

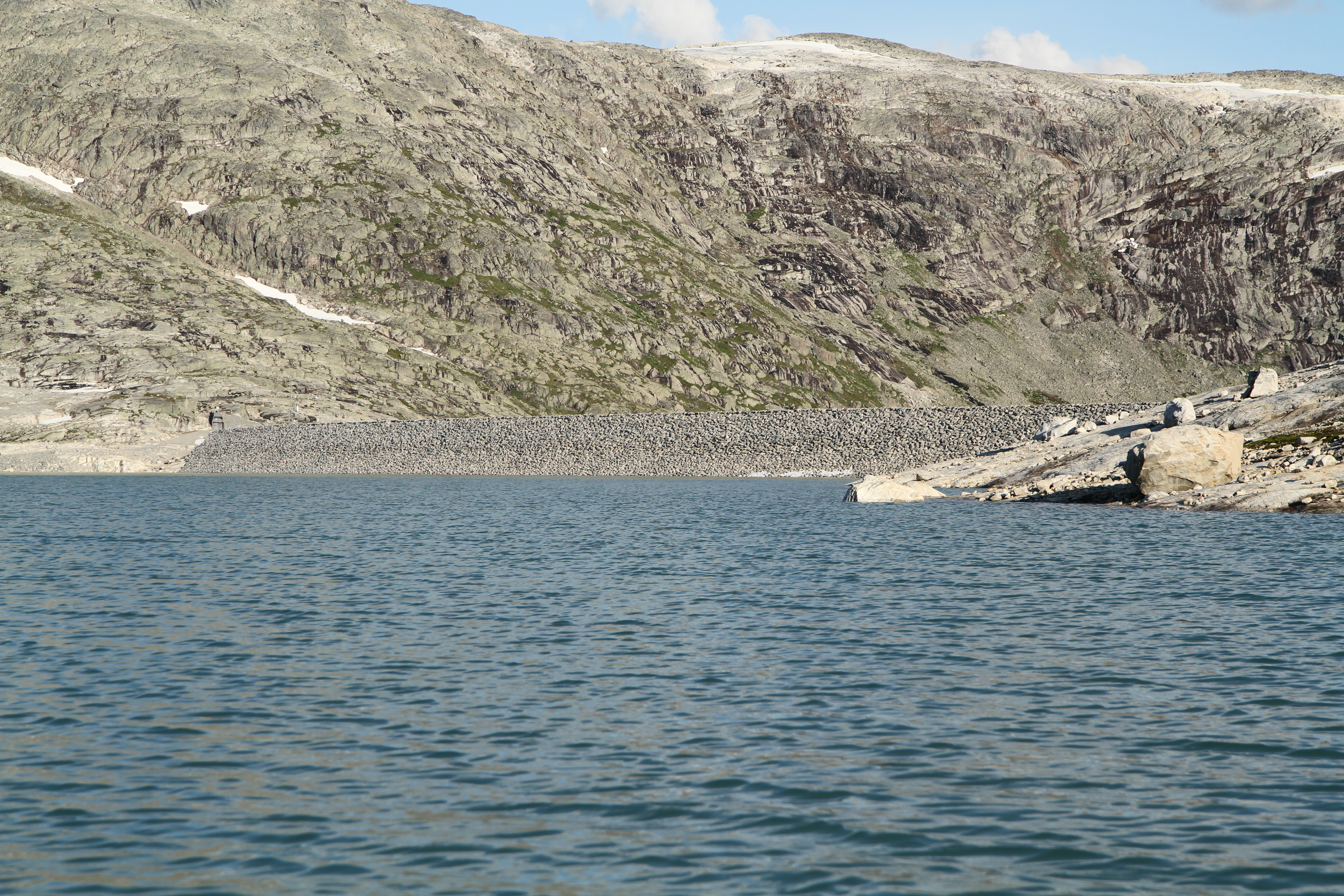
Dam of the lake (2011)

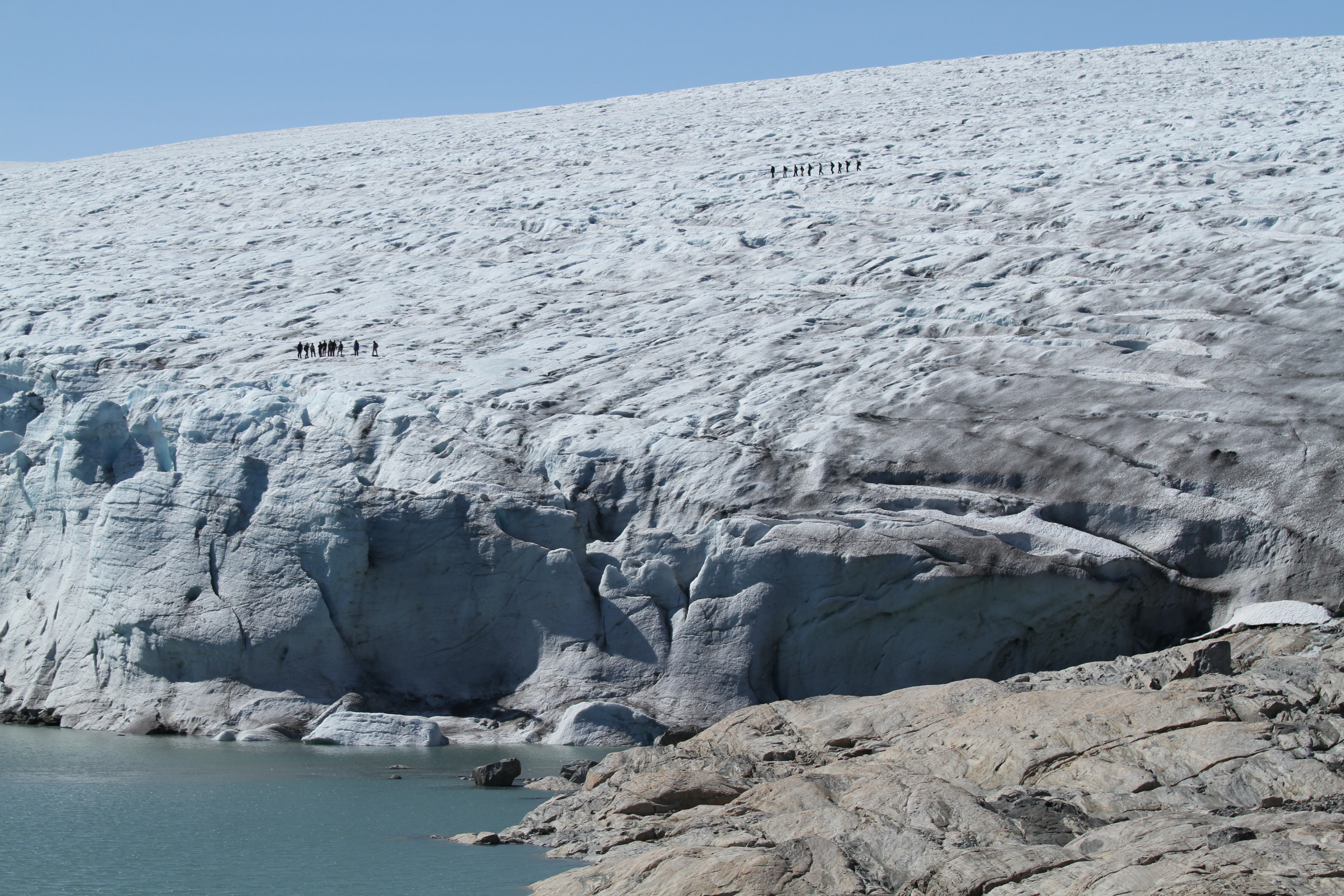
Tour on the glacier (2011)

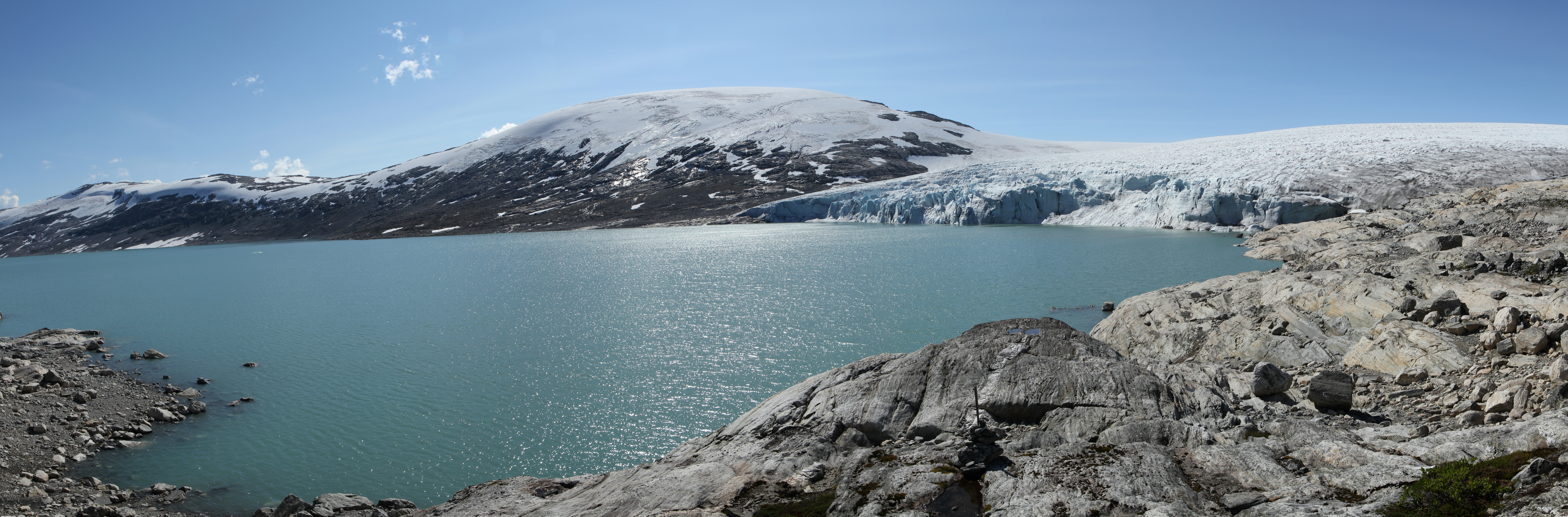
View of the glacier lake (2011)

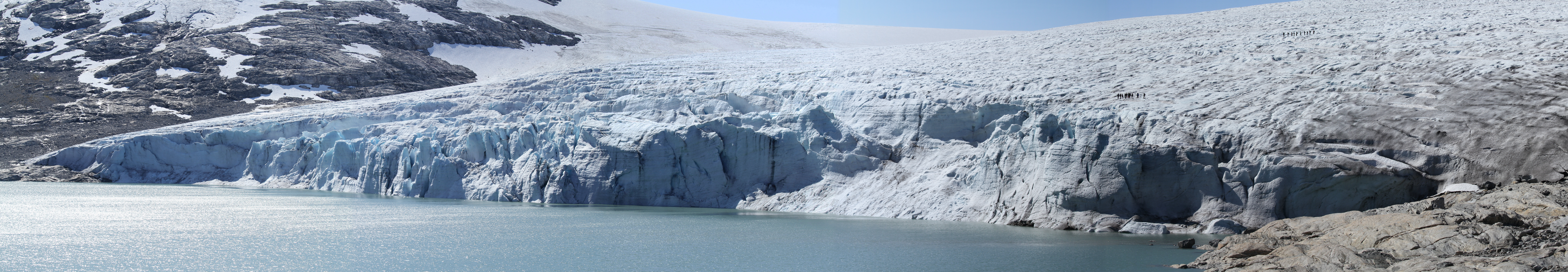
View of the glacier (2011)
