= Myklebustbreen =

Glacier in Vestland, Norway

- Snønipbreen (unofficial)
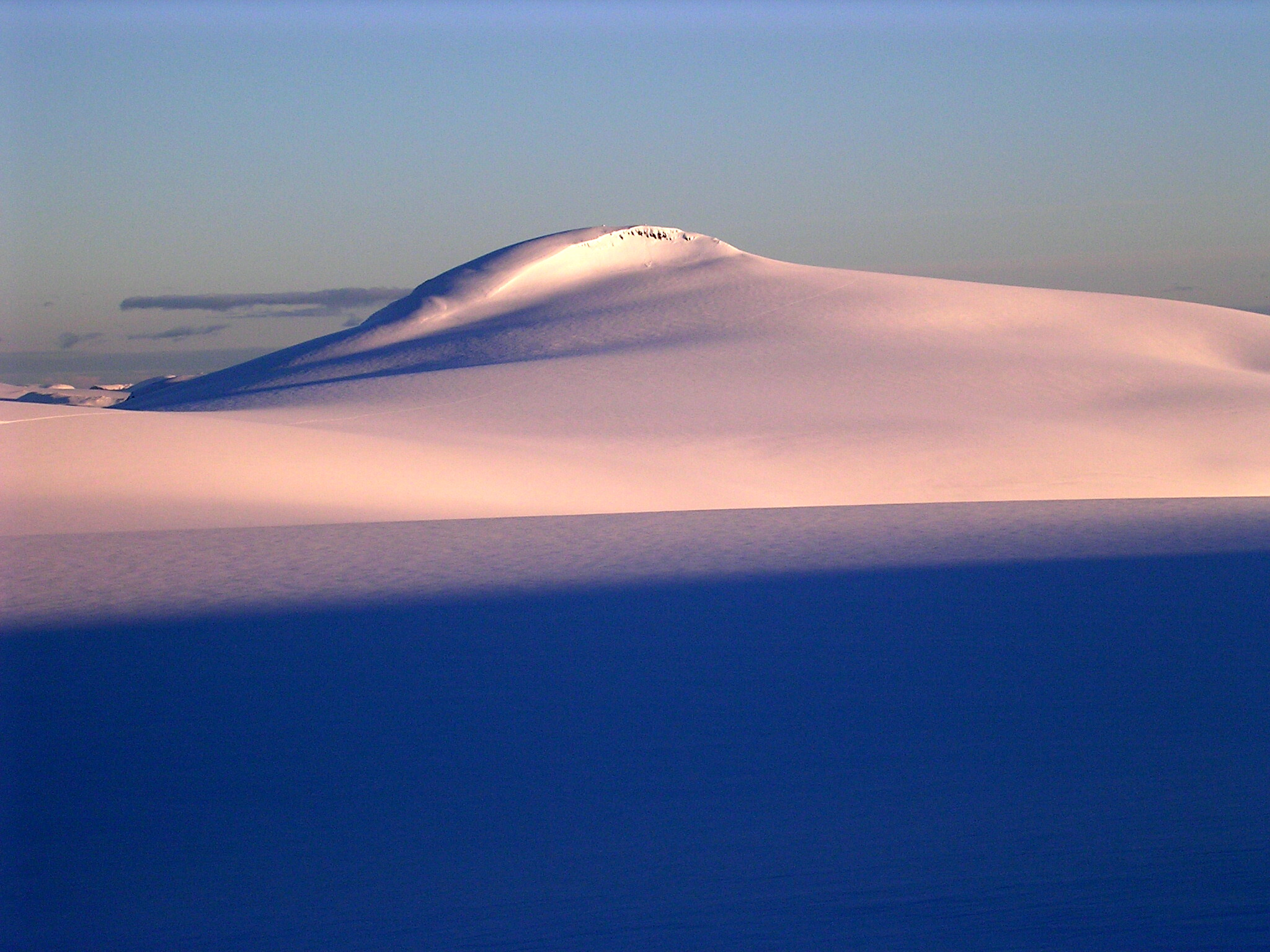
- Highest point at Myklebustbreen, Snønipa
- Interactive map of the glacier
- Location: Vestland, Norway
- Coordinates: 61.73139°N 6.68508°E
- Area: 57 km^{2} (22 sq mi)
- Highest elevation: 1,827 metres (5,994 ft)
- Lowest elevation: 890 metres (2,920 ft)

Myklebustbreen is the seventh largest glacier in mainland Norway. It is located along the borders of Sunnfjord Municipality, Gloppen Municipality, and Stryn Municipality in Vestland county. Its highest point is located just below the nunatak Snønipa, with an altitude of 1,827 metres (5,994 ft). The lowest point on the glacier is at an elevation of 890 metres (2,920 ft) above sea level.

The villages of Byrkjelo and Egge both lie on the European route E39 highway which runs north and south, about 7 kilometres (4.3 mi) east of Myklebustbreen. The Oldedalen valley lies to the east of the glacier. The glacier also lies northwest of the large Jostedalsbreen glacier, and both are part of Jostedalsbreen National Park. Jostedalsbreen and Myklebustbreen are separated by the Stardalen valley.

The glacier is officially named Myklebustbreen, but since it is located on the mountain Snønipa, it is also informally known as Snønipbreen (lit. 'Snønipa Glacier').

== See also ==
- List of glaciers in Norway
