= Jostedøla =

River in Vestland, Norway

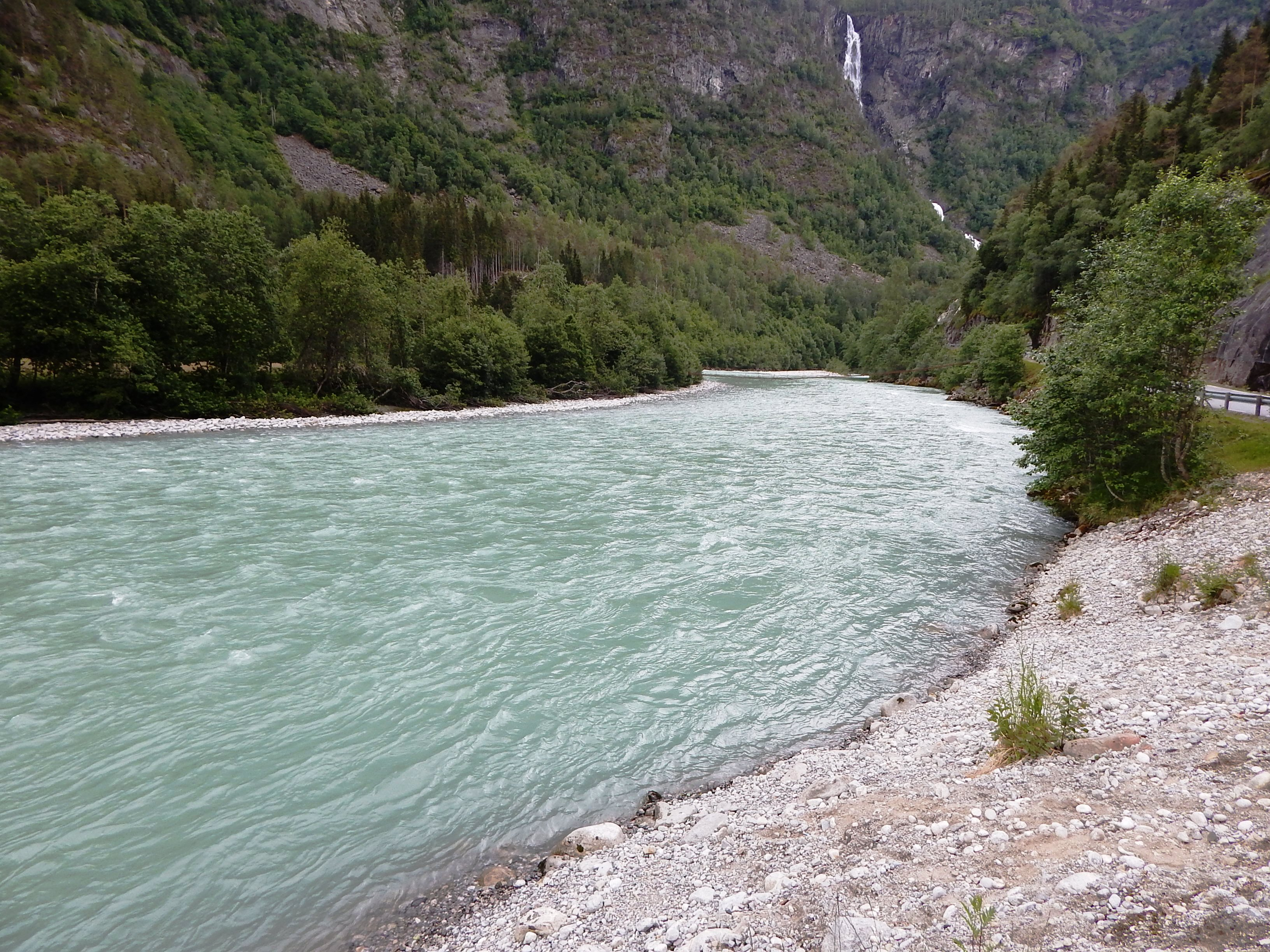

Location
- Country: Norway
- County: Vestland
- Municipalities: Luster Municipality

Physical characteristics
- Source: Jostedalsbreen
  - location: Jostedalen, Vestland
  - coordinates: 61.74656°N 7.335778°E
  - elevation: 516 metres (1,693 ft)
- Mouth: Sognefjorden
  - location: Gaupne, Vestland
  - coordinates: 61.39602°N 7.29072°E
  - elevation: 0 metres (0 ft)
- Length: 50 km (31 mi)
- Basin size: 804 km^{2} (310 sq mi)

Jostedøla (or unofficially: Jostedalselva) is a river which runs through the Jostedalen valley in Luster Municipality in Vestland county, Norway. The Jostedøla river begins near the Fåbergstølen mountain farm where the runoff from the great Jostedalsbreen glacier and the lakes Austdalsvatnet and Styggevatnet comes together in the Jostedalen valley. It then flows south for about 50 kilometres (31 mi), through the Jostedalen valley, and finally empties into the Gaupnefjorden (a small arm off of the Sognefjorden) at the village of Gaupne. The river is the main collector of water for an 804-square-kilometre (310 sq mi) watershed area. The river is great for fishing trout and some salmon.

The river has historically brought significant flooding. In August 1979, the river had a 100-year flood due to local rain and strong snow and glacial melting. The flood was higher than the previous one-hundred year flood in 1898. The Leirdøla power plant was built in 1978, which has helped reduce the flood risk along the waterway.

== See also ==
- List of rivers in Norway
