= Austdalsvatnet =

Lake in Vestland, Norway

- Interactive map of Austdalsvatnet
- Location: Luster Municipality, Vestland
- Coordinates: 61.7848°N 7.4078°E
- Basin countries: Norway
- Surface area: 7.94 km^{2} (3.07 sq mi)
- Shore length^{1}: 16.53 kilometres (10.27 mi)
- Surface elevation: 1,200 metres (3,900 ft)
- References: NVE
- ^{1} Shore length is not a well-defined measure.

Austdalsvatnet is a lake in the northwestern part of Luster Municipality in Vestland county, Norway. It is located in the Breheimen mountain range at the end of the Austdalsbreen glacier, just north of the lake Styggevatnet. The lake originally was located immediately to the northwest of the lake Styggevatnet, but after the construction of the dam on the south end of Styggevatnet, the two lakes have grown together as the water level rose. It is about 10 kilometres (6.2 mi) east of Lodalskåpa and Brenibba, in the Jostedalsbreen glacier. The water is regulated by a dam on lake Styggevatnet and it empties into the Jostedøla river which flows south into the Gaupnefjord (part of the Sognefjord).

== See also ==
- List of lakes in Norway
