= Jostedalsbreen National Park =

National park of Norway

- IUCN category II (national park)

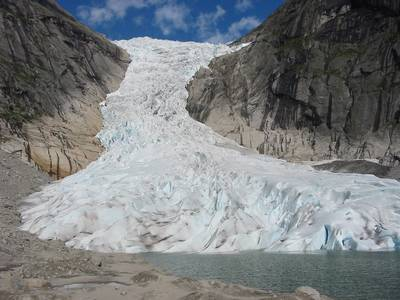
- Briksdalsbreen (Briksdal glacier) attracts over 300,000 visitors every year.
- Interactive map of Jostedalsbreen National Park
- Location: Vestland, Norway
- Coordinates: 61°41′N 6°59′E
- Area: 1,310 km^{2} (510 sq mi)
- Established: 25 October 1991
- Governing body: Norwegian Environment Agency

Jostedalsbreen National Park (Norwegian: Jostedalsbreen nasjonalpark) is a national park in Norway that encompasses the largest glacier on the European mainland, Jostedalsbreen. The park was established by royal decree on 25 October 1991, and then in 1998, it was enlarged to the northwest. The park now covers 1,310 square kilometres (510 sq mi), with the glaciers covering about 800 square kilometres (310 sq mi) of the park.

== Location ==
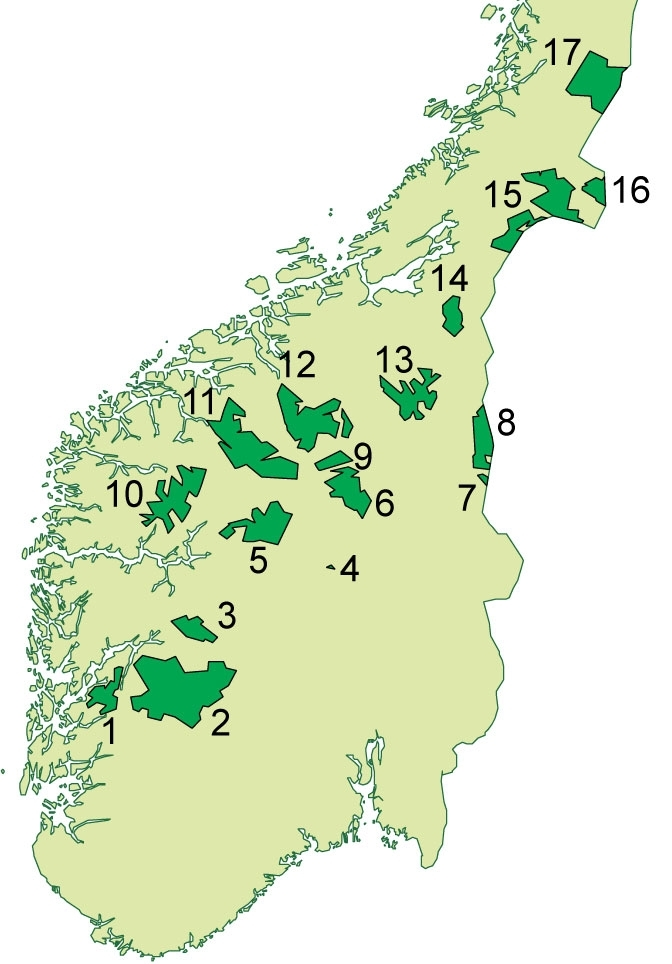
Map of National Parks in Norway. Jostedalsbreen National Park is #10

The park lies in the municipalities of Luster, Sogndal, Gloppen, Sunnfjord, and Stryn, all of which are in Vestland county. There are three museums and also visitors centers: the Breheimsenteret in Jostedalen, Jostedalsbreen nasjonalparksenter in Oppstryn (Stryn Municipality) and Norsk bremuseum in Fjærland (Sogndal Municipality).

== Topography ==
The highest peak in the park is Lodalskåpa at 2,083 metres (6,834 ft). The glacier's highest point, Brenibba, lies 2,018 metres (6,621 ft) above sea level while its lowest point is 350 metres (1,150 ft) above sea level. The glacier has shrunk in recent years, and there are ruins of farms that were overtaken by the glacier in 1750.

== Name ==
The park was named after the main glacier in it, Jostedalsbreen. The first element of that name is the name of the old Jostedal Municipality, the last element is the finite form of the word bre which means "glacier".

== See also ==
- List of glaciers in Norway
