= Søverhøi =

Mountain in Skjåk, Norway

- Søverhøe
- Interactive map of the mountain

Highest point
- Elevation: 1,688 m (5,538 ft)
- Prominence: 149 m (489 ft)
- Parent peak: Dyringshøi
- Isolation: 2.5 km (1.6 mi)
- Coordinates: 61°50′51″N 7°40′33″E

Geography
- Location: Innlandet, Norway
- Parent range: Breheimen

Søverhøi is a mountain in Skjåk Municipality in Innlandet county, Norway. The 1,688-metre (5,538 ft) tall mountain is located in the Breheimen mountains and inside the Breheimen National Park, about 30 kilometres (19 mi) west of the village of Bismo and about 20 kilometres (12 mi) south of the village of Grotli. The mountain is surrounded by several other notable mountains including Dyringshøi to the northeast; Leirvasshøi to the northwest; Tverreggi, Sprongeggi and Rivenoskulen to the southwest; and Tverrådalskyrkja and Tundradalskyrkja to the south.

== See also ==
- List of mountains of Norway
