= Sandåtinden =

Mountain in Skjåk, Norway

- Interactive map of the mountain

Highest point
- Elevation: 1,931 m (6,335 ft)
- Prominence: 151 m (495 ft)
- Parent peak: Skridulaupen
- Isolation: 2.5 km (1.6 mi)
- Coordinates: 61°55′43″N 7°34′25″E

Geography
- Location: Innlandet, Norway
- Parent range: Breheimen

Sandåtinden is a mountain in Skjåk Municipality in Innlandet county, Norway. The 1,931-metre (6,335 ft) tall mountain is located in the Breheimen mountains and inside the Breheimen National Park, about 10 kilometres (6.2 mi) south of the village of Grotli. The mountain is surrounded by several other notable mountains including Skridulaupen to the northeast, Raudeggi to the northwest, Kvitlenova to the west, Mårådalsfjellet to the southwest, and Dyringshøi and Søverhøi to the southeast. The Sandåbreen glacier lies between Sandåtinden and Skridulaupen. The lake Rauddalsvatnet lies about 3.5 kilometres (2.2 mi) southeast of the mountain.

== See also ==
- List of mountains of Norway
