= Leirvasshøi =

Mountain in Skjåk, Norway

- Leirvasshøe
- Interactive map of the mountain

Highest point
- Elevation: 1,728 m (5,669 ft)
- Prominence: 77 m (253 ft)
- Isolation: 3.9 km (2.4 mi)
- Coordinates: 61°52′52″N 7°26′27″E

Geography
- Location: Innlandet, Norway
- Parent range: Breheimen

Leirvasshøi is a mountain in Skjåk Municipality in Innlandet county, Norway. The 1,728-metre (5,669 ft) tall mountain is located in the Breheimen mountains and inside the Breheimen National Park, about 18 kilometres (11 mi) southwest of the village of Grotli and about 20 kilometres (12 mi) east of the village of Oppstryn. The mountain is surrounded by several other notable mountains including Kvitlenova and Raudeggi to the north, Mårådalsfjellet and Skridulaupen to the northeast, Dyringshøi to the east, Søverhøi to the southeast, and Tverreggi to the south. The vast Jostedalsbreen glacier lies just to the southwest of this mountain.

== See also ==
- List of mountains of Norway
