= Røykjeskarhøi =

Mountain in Skjåk, Norway

- Interactive map of the mountain

Highest point
- Elevation: 1,804 m (5,919 ft)
- Prominence: 196 m (643 ft)
- Parent peak: Tverrådalskyrkja
- Isolation: 2.4 km (1.5 mi)
- Coordinates: 61°44′29″N 7°37′46″E

Geography
- Location: Innlandet and Vestland, Norway
- Parent range: Breheimen

Røykjeskarhøi is a mountain on the border of Skjåk Municipality in Innlandet county and Luster Municipality in Vestland county, Norway. The 1,804-metre (5,919 ft) tall mountain is located in the Breheimen mountains and inside the Breheimen National Park, about 30 kilometres (19 mi) south of the village of Grotli and about 20 kilometres (12 mi) northeast of the Jostedalen valley. The mountain is surrounded by several other notable mountains including Tverrådalskyrkja and Tundradalskyrkja to the east, Rivenoskulen to the west, and Syrtbyttnosi and Sprongeggi to the northwest.

== See also ==
- List of mountains of Norway
