= Dyringshøi =

Mountain in Skjåk, Norway

- Dyringshøe
- Interactive map of the mountain

Highest point
- Elevation: 1,813 m (5,948 ft)
- Prominence: 286 m (938 ft)
- Isolation: 5.8 km (3.6 mi)
- Coordinates: 61°53′07″N 7°41′56″E

Geography
- Location: Innlandet, Norway
- Parent range: Breheimen

Dyringshøi is a mountain in Skjåk Municipality in Innlandet county, Norway. The 1,813-metre (5,948 ft) tall mountain is located in the Breheimen mountains and inside the Breheimen National Park, about 30 kilometres (19 mi) west of the village of Bismo and about 15 kilometres (9.3 mi) south of the village of Grotli. The mountain is surrounded by several other notable mountains including Skridulaupen to the north, Sandåtinden and Mårådalsfjellet to the northwest, Leirvasshøi to the west, Tverreggi to the southwest, and Søverhøi to the south. The lake Rauddalsvatnet lies just north of the mountain.

== See also ==
- List of mountains of Norway
