= Syrtbyttnosi =

Mountain in Skjåk, Norway

- Syrtbyttnose
- Interactive map of the mountain

Highest point
- Elevation: 1,700 m (5,600 ft)
- Prominence: 148 m (486 ft)
- Parent peak: Rivenoskulen
- Isolation: 2.1 km (1.3 mi)
- Coordinates: 61°45′43″N 7°34′52″E

Geography
- Location: Innlandet, Norway
- Parent range: Breheimen

Syrtbyttnosi is a mountain in Skjåk Municipality in Innlandet county, Norway. The 1,700-metre (5,600 ft) tall mountain is located in the Breheimen mountains and inside the Breheimen National Park, about 29 kilometres (18 mi) south of the village of Grotli and about 20 kilometres (12 mi) northeast of the Jostedalen valley. The mountain is surrounded by several other notable mountains including Tundradalskyrkja and Tverrådalskyrkja to the southeast, Røykjeskarhøi and Rivenoskulen to the south, and Sprongeggi and Tverreggi to the northwest.

== See also ==
- List of mountains of Norway
