= Mårådalsfjellet =

Mountain in Skjåk, Norway

- Interactive map of the mountain

Highest point
- Elevation: 1,850 m (6,070 ft)
- Prominence: 80 m (260 ft)
- Coordinates: 61°54′41″N 7°28′36″E

Geography
- Location: Innlandet, Norway
- Parent range: Breheimen

Mårådalsfjellet is a mountain in Skjåk Municipality in Innlandet county, Norway. The 1,850-metre (6,070 ft) tall mountain is located in the Breheimen mountains and inside the Breheimen National Park, about 14 kilometres (8.7 mi) southwest of the village of Grotli and about 24 kilometres (15 mi) east of the village of Oppstryn. The mountain is surrounded by several other notable mountains including Skridulaupen and Sandåtinden to the northeast, Raudeggi to the north, Kvitlenova to the northwest, Leirvasshøi to the southwest, and Dyringshøi and Søverhøi to the southeast. The Tystigbreen glacier lies just west of the mountain.

The mountain has a secondary peak called Høgkulen, which has an altitude of 1,842 m (6,043 ft) above sea level.

== See also ==
- List of mountains of Norway
