= Tverreggi =

Mountain in Skjåk, Norway

- Tverreggje
- Interactive map of the mountain

Highest point
- Elevation: 1,765 m (5,791 ft)
- Prominence: 455 m (1,493 ft)
- Isolation: 7.5 km (4.7 mi) to Bandet
- Coordinates: 61°47′43″N 7°29′24″E

Geography
- Location: Innlandet, Norway
- Parent range: Breheimen

Tverreggi is a mountain in Skjåk Municipality in Innlandet county, Norway. The 1,765-metre (5,791 ft) tall mountain is located in the Breheimen mountains and inside the Breheimen National Park, about 27 kilometres (17 mi) southwest of the village of Grotli and about 700 metres (2,300 ft) east of the border with Luster Municipality in Vestland county. The mountain is surrounded by several other notable mountains including Dyringshøi and Søverhøi to the northeast, Leirvasshøi to the north, Sprongeggi to the south, and Rivenoskulen and Tverrådalskyrkja to the southeast.

== See also ==
- List of mountains of Norway
