= Langvasseggi =

Mountain in Skjåk, Norway

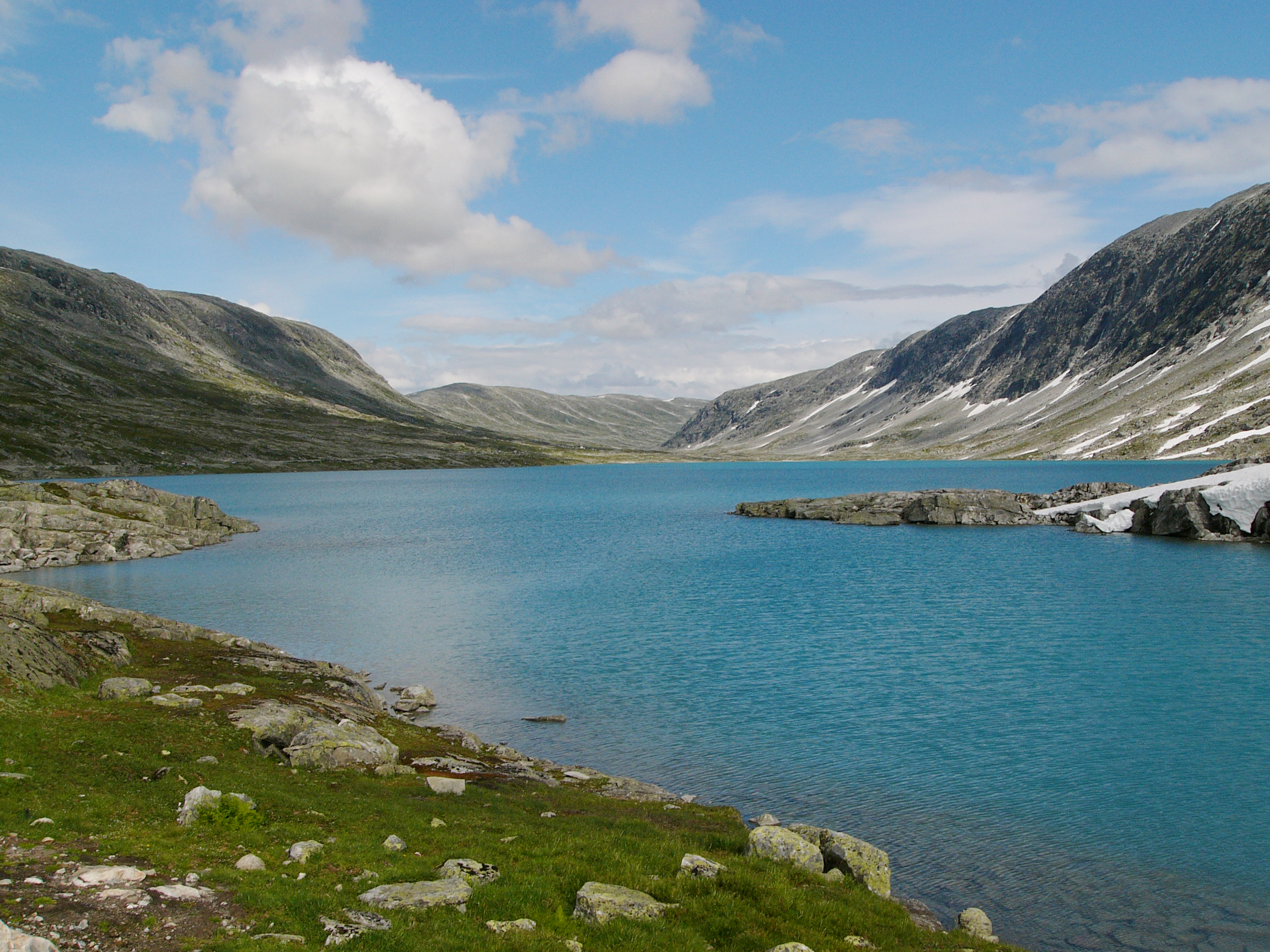
- View of the lake Langvatnet with Langvasseggi to the left of the lake

Highest point
- Elevation: 1,651 m (5,417 ft)
- Prominence: 212 m (696 ft)
- Isolation: 3.3 km (2.1 mi)
- Coordinates: 61°58′43″N 7°23′56″E

Geography
- Interactive map of the mountain
- Location: Innlandet and Vestland, Norway
- Parent range: Strynefjellet

Langvasseggi is a mountain on the border of Skjåk Municipality in Innlandet county and Stryn Municipality in Vestland county, Norway. The 1,651-metre (5,417 ft) tall mountain is located in the Strynefjellet mountains and inside the Breheimen National Park, about 12 kilometres (7.5 mi) southwest of the village of Grotli and about 20 kilometres (12 mi) northeast of the village of Oppstryn. The mountain is surrounded by several other notable mountains including Raudeggi to the southeast, Kvitlenova to the south, Nuken to the southwest, and Breiddalseggi to the north. The Norwegian National Road 15 runs along the north side of the mountain. The lake Langvatnet lies just south of the mountain.

== See also ==
- List of mountains of Norway
