= Kvitlenova =

Mountain in Skjåk, Norway

- Interactive map of the mountain

Highest point
- Elevation: 1,898 m (6,227 ft)
- Prominence: 370 m (1,210 ft)
- Parent peak: Raudeggi
- Isolation: 4.6 km (2.9 mi) to Raudeggi
- Coordinates: 61°55′59″N 7°23′20″E

Geography
- Location: Innlandet and Vestland, Norway
- Parent range: Strynefjellet

Kvitlenova is a mountain on the border of Skjåk Municipality in Innlandet county and Stryn Municipality in Vestland county, Norway. The 1,898-metre (6,227 ft) tall mountain is located in the Strynefjellet mountains and inside the Breheimen National Park, about 15 kilometres (9.3 mi) southwest of the village of Grotli and about 18 kilometres (11 mi) east of the village of Oppstryn. The mountain is surrounded by several other notable mountains including Langvasseggi to the north, Raudeggi to the northeast, Skridulaupen and Sandåtinden to the east, Mårådalsfjellet to the southeast, Leirvasshøi to the south, and Nuken to the west. The Tystigbreen glacier lies on the west side of this mountain.

== See also ==
- List of mountains of Norway
