= Rivenoskulen =

Mountain in Skjåk, Norway

- Interactive map of the mountain

Highest point
- Elevation: 1,942 m (6,371 ft)
- Prominence: 499 m (1,637 ft)
- Isolation: 5.5 km (3.4 mi)
- Coordinates: 61°44′07″N 7°34′21″E

Geography
- Location: Innlandet and Vestland, Norway
- Parent range: Breheimen

Rivenoskulen is a mountain on the border of Skjåk Municipality in Innlandet county and Luster Municipality in Vestland county, Norway. The 1,942-metre (6,371 ft) tall mountain is located in the Breheimen mountains and inside the Breheimen National Park, about 30 kilometres (19 mi) south of the village of Grotli and about 18 kilometres (11 mi) northeast of the Jostedalen valley. The mountain is surrounded by several other notable mountains including Tverrådalskyrkja and Røykjeskarhøi to the east, Syrtbyttnosi to the north, and Sprongeggi to the northwest.

== See also ==
- List of mountains of Norway
