= Langvatnet (Skjåk) =

Lake in Skjåk, Norway

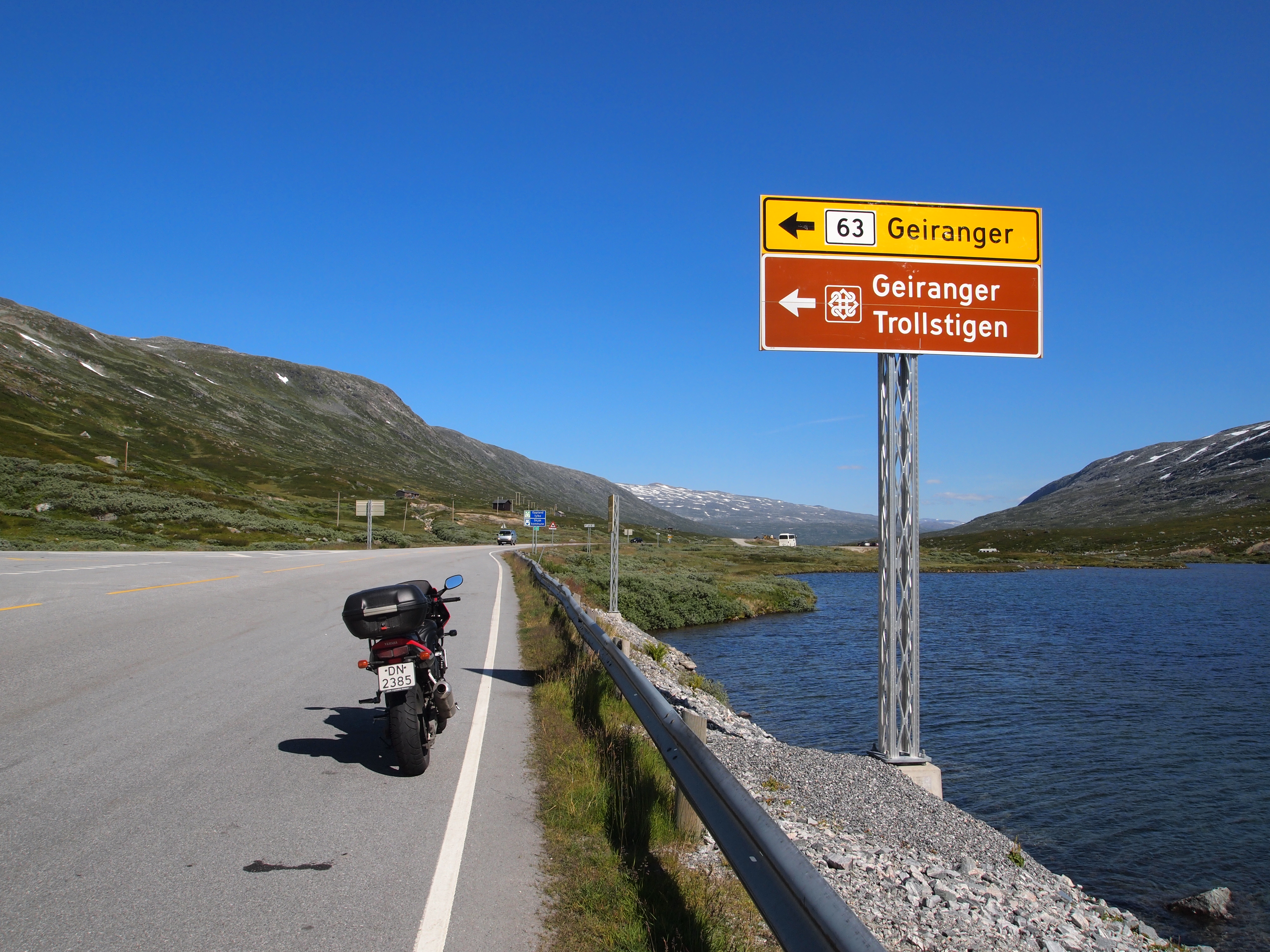
- Interactive map of the lake
- Location: Skjåk Municipality, Innlandet
- Coordinates: 61°57′41″N 7°23′54″E
- Basin countries: Norway
- Max. length: 2.9 kilometres (1.8 mi)
- Max. width: 700 metres (2,300 ft)
- Surface area: 1.14 km^{2} (0.44 sq mi)
- Max. depth: 37 metres (121 ft)
- Surface elevation: 1,422 metres (4,665 ft)
- References: NVE

Langvatnet is a lake on the border of Skjåk Municipality in Innlandet county and Stryn Municipality in Vestland county, Norway. Most of the 1.1295-square-kilometre (0.4361 sq mi) lake lies within Skjåk municipality. The lake lies in a narrow mountain valley in the Strynefjellet mountains. The lake is wedged between the mountain Langvasseggi to the north and Raudeggi to the south. The lake lies along the border of the Breheimen National Park.

== See also ==
- List of lakes in Norway
