= Skridulaupen =

Mountain in Skjåk, Norway

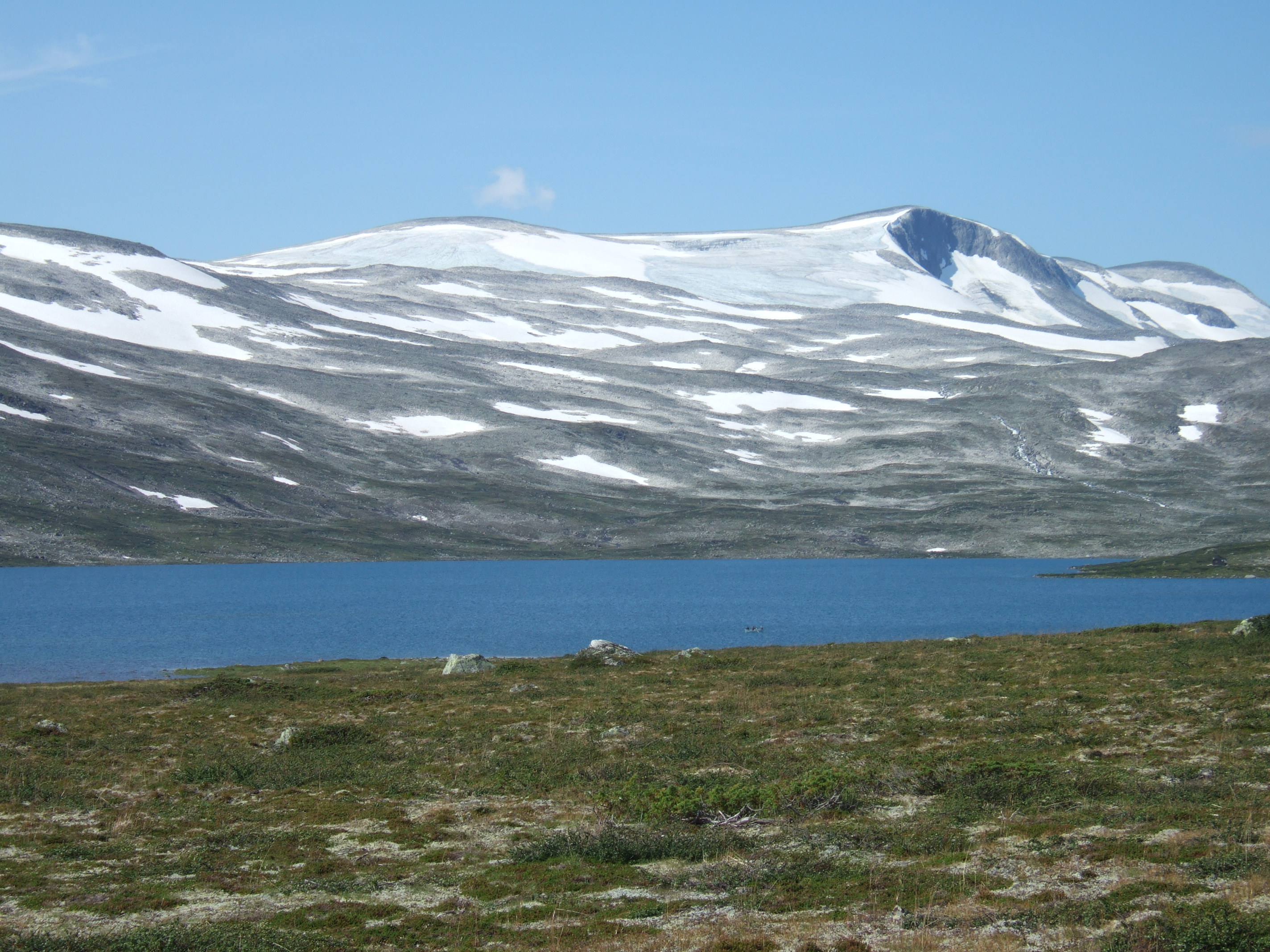
- View of the mountain Skridulaupen

Highest point
- Elevation: 1,962 m (6,437 ft)
- Prominence: 719 m (2,359 ft)
- Isolation: 22.6 km (14.0 mi) to Tordsnose
- Coordinates: 61°56′44″N 7°36′14″E

Geography
- Interactive map of the mountain
- Location: Innlandet, Norway
- Parent range: Breheimen

Skridulaupen is a mountain in Skjåk Municipality in Innlandet county, Norway. The 1,962-metre (6,437 ft) tall mountain is located in the Breheimen mountains and inside the Breheimen National Park, about 8 kilometres (5.0 mi) south of the village of Grotli. The mountain is surrounded by several other notable mountains including Raudeggi and Kvitlenova to the west, Mårådalsfjellet to the west-southwest, and Sandåtinden to the southwest. The Sandåbreen glacier lies between Skridulaupen and Sandåfjellet. The lake Rauddalsvatnet lies 4 kilometres (2.5 mi) south of the mountain.

== See also ==
- List of mountains of Norway
