= Sprongeggi =

Mountain in Skjåk, Norway

Sprongeggi Sprangdalseggi
- Sprongdalseggi (historic)
- Interactive map of the mountain

Highest point
- Elevation: 1,707 m (5,600 ft)
- Prominence: 320 m (1,050 ft)
- Parent peak: Tverreggi
- Isolation: 4.1 km (2.5 mi) to Greinbreen
- Coordinates: 61°45′37″N 7°30′57″E

Geography
- Location: Innlandet and Vestland, Norway
- Parent range: Breheimen

Sprongeggi or Sprangdalseggi is a mountain on the border of Skjåk Municipality in Innlandet county and Luster Municipality in Vestland county, Norway. The 1,707-metre (5,600 ft) tall mountain is located in the Breheimen mountains and inside the Breheimen National Park, about 30 kilometres (19 mi) southwest of the village of Grotli and about 20 kilometres (12 mi) northeast of the Jostedalen valley. The mountain is surrounded by several other notable mountains including Syrtbyttnosi to the east, Rivenoskulen to the southeast, Greineggi to the south, and Tverreggi to the north. The lake Styggevatnet lies immediately northwest of the lake.

== See also ==
- List of mountains of Norway
