= Nordberg Church (Innlandet) =

Church in Innlandet, Norway

- Nordberg kyrkje
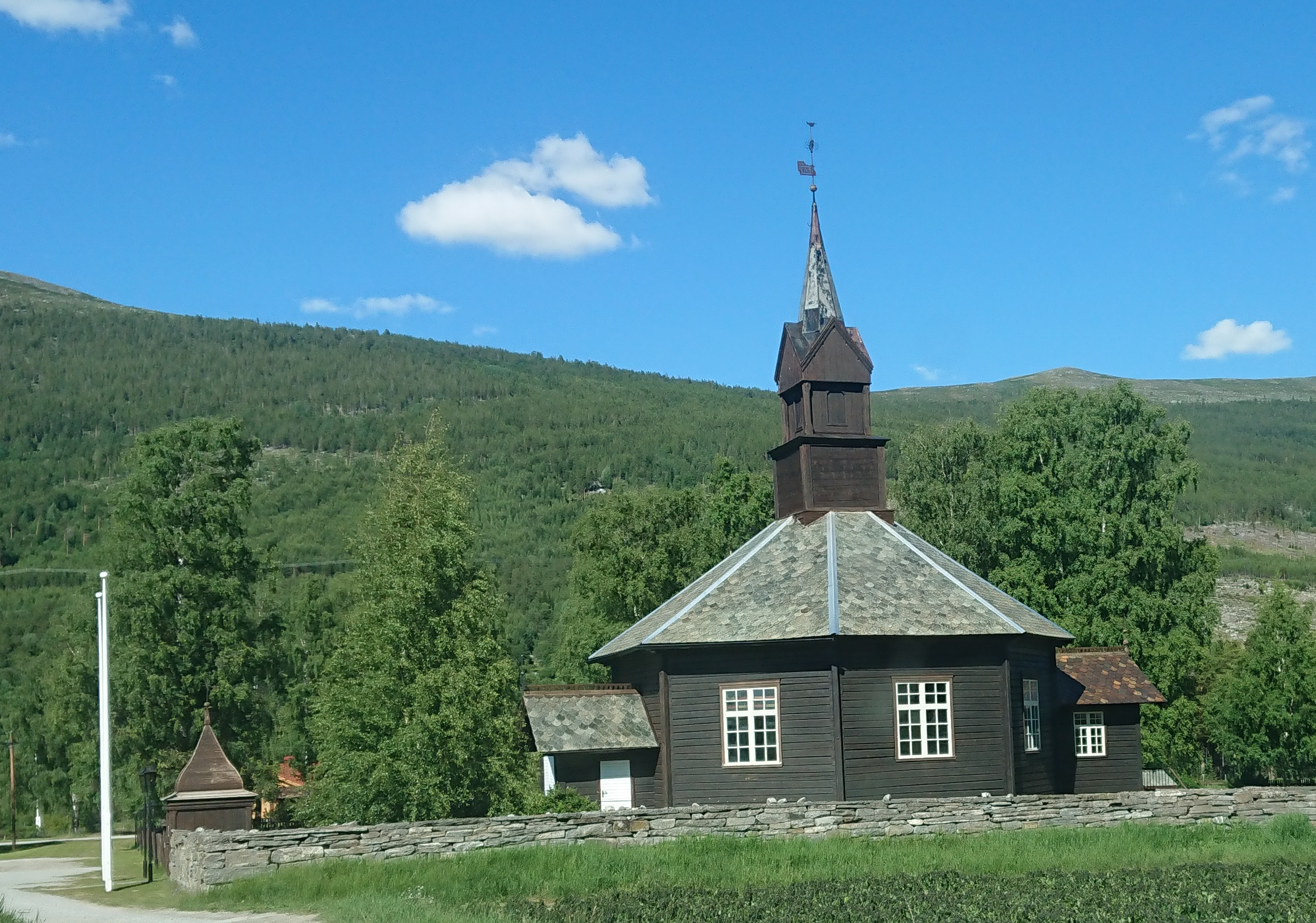
- View of the church
- Nordberg Church
- 61°54′21″N 8°09′16″E
- Location: Skjåk Municipality, Innlandet
- Country: Norway
- Denomination: Church of Norway
- Churchmanship: Evangelical Lutheran

History
- Status: Parish church
- Founded: 1864
- Consecrated: 1864

Architecture
- Functional status: Active
- Architect: Jacob Wilhelm Nordan
- Architectural type: Octagonal
- Completed: 1864 (162 years ago)

Specifications
- Capacity: 215
- Materials: Wood

Administration
- Diocese: Hamar bispedømme
- Deanery: Nord-Gudbrandsdal prosti
- Parish: Nordberg
- Norwegian Cultural Heritage Site
- Type: Church
- Status: Protected
- ID: 85145

Nordberg Church (Norwegian: Nordberg kyrkje) is a parish church of the Church of Norway in Skjåk Municipality in Innlandet county, Norway. It is located in the village of Nordberg. It is the church for the Nordberg parish which is part of the Nord-Gudbrandsdal prosti (deanery) in the Diocese of Hamar. The brown, wooden church was built in an octagonal design in 1864 using plans drawn up by the architect Jacob Wilhelm Nordan. The church seats about 215 people.

== History ==
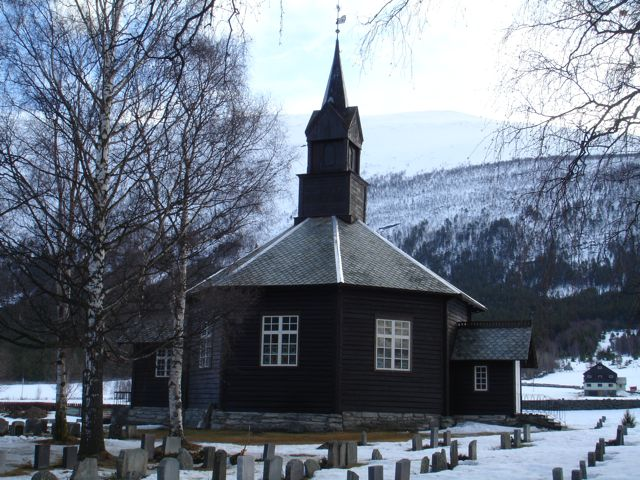
View of the church

Planning for a new church in Nordberg began around 1860. The architect Jacob Wilhelm Nordan was hired to design the new building and Jakob Jonsen Storlien was hired as the lead builder. The church was designed as an octagonal building with a small church porch in the west and a sacristy in the east. The church was built from 1862 to 1864 and it was consecrated in 1864.

== See also ==
- List of churches in Hamar
