= Raudeggi =

Mountain in Skjåk, Norway

- Raudeggje
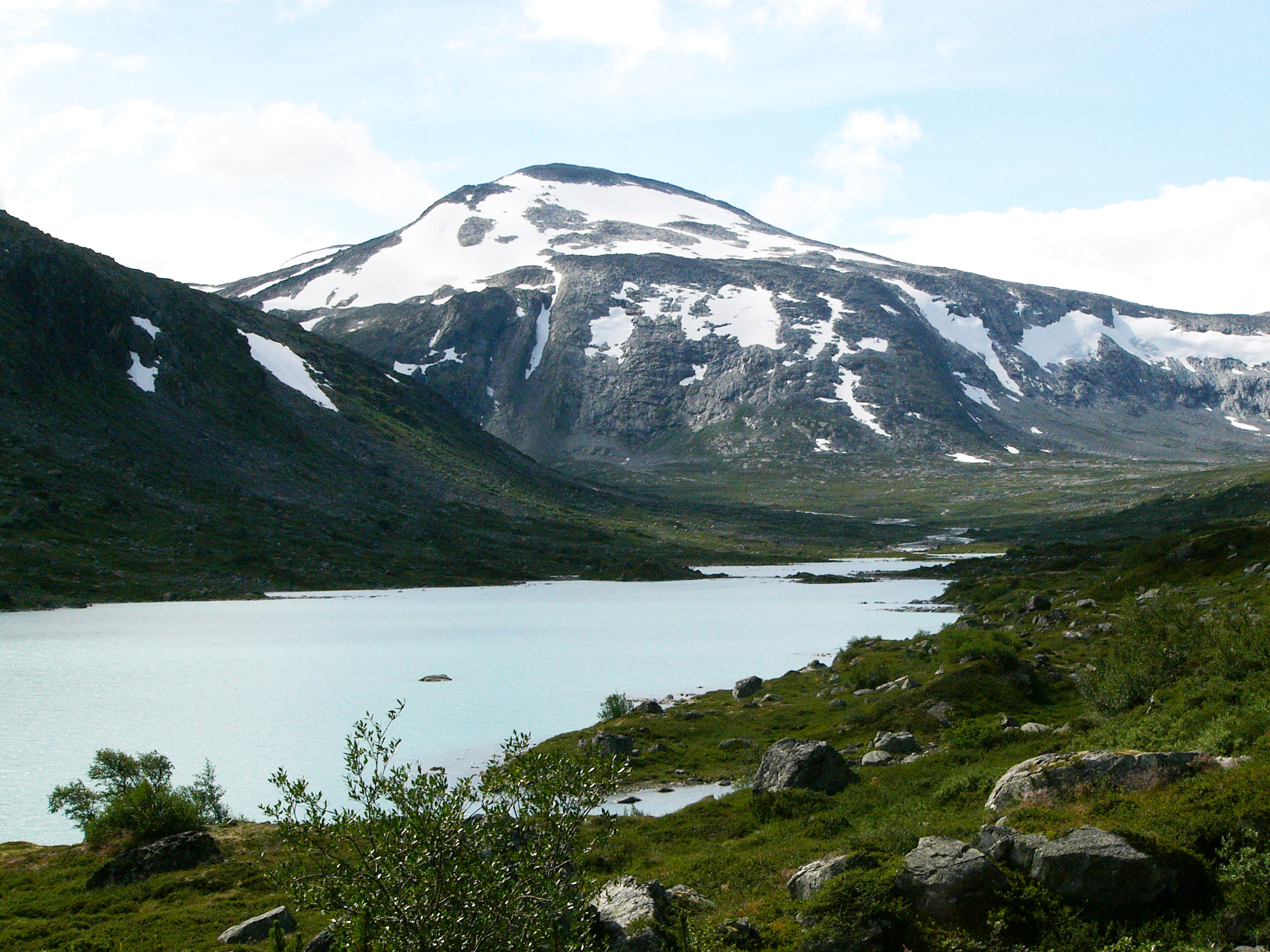
- View of the mountain Raudeggi

Highest point
- Elevation: 1,938 m (6,358 ft)
- Prominence: 461 m (1,512 ft)
- Parent peak: Skridulaupen
- Isolation: 6.7 km (4.2 mi) to Skridulaupen
- Coordinates: 61°56′49″N 7°28′26″E

Geography
- Interactive map of the mountain
- Location: Innlandet, Norway
- Parent range: Strynefjellet

Raudeggi is a mountain in Skjåk Municipality in Innlandet county, Norway. The 1,938-metre (6,358 ft) tall mountain is located in the Strynefjellet mountains and inside the Breheimen National Park, about 11 kilometres (6.8 mi) southwest of the village of Grotli and 23 kilometres (14 mi) northeast of the village of Oppstryn. The mountain is surrounded by several other notable mountains including Langvasseggi to the northwest, Kvitlenova to the west, Mårådalsfjellet to the south, and Sandåtinden and Skridalaupen to the southwest. The glacier Raudeggbreen is located on the north side of the mountain.

== See also ==
- List of mountains of Norway
