= Tundradalskyrkja =

Mountain in Skjåk, Norway

- Interactive map of the mountain

Highest point
- Elevation: 1,970 m (6,460 ft)
- Prominence: 380 m (1,250 ft)
- Isolation: 3.73 km (2.32 mi)
- Coordinates: 61°44′41″N 7°45′27″E

Geography
- Location: Innlandet and Vestland, Norway
- Parent range: Breheimen

Tundradalskyrkja is a mountain on the border of Skjåk Municipality in Innlandet county and Luster Municipality in Vestland county, Norway. The 1,970-metre (6,460 ft) tall mountain is located in the Breheimen mountains and inside the Breheimen National Park, about 30 kilometres (19 mi) south of the village of Grotli and about 30 kilometres (19 mi) northeast of the Jostedalen valley. The mountain is surrounded by several other notable mountains including Gjelhøi to the east, Holåtindan to the southeast, Tverrådalskyrkja to the west, and Syrtbyttnosi to the northwest.

== See also ==
- List of mountains of Norway
