= Jan-Magnus Bruheim =

Norwegian writer

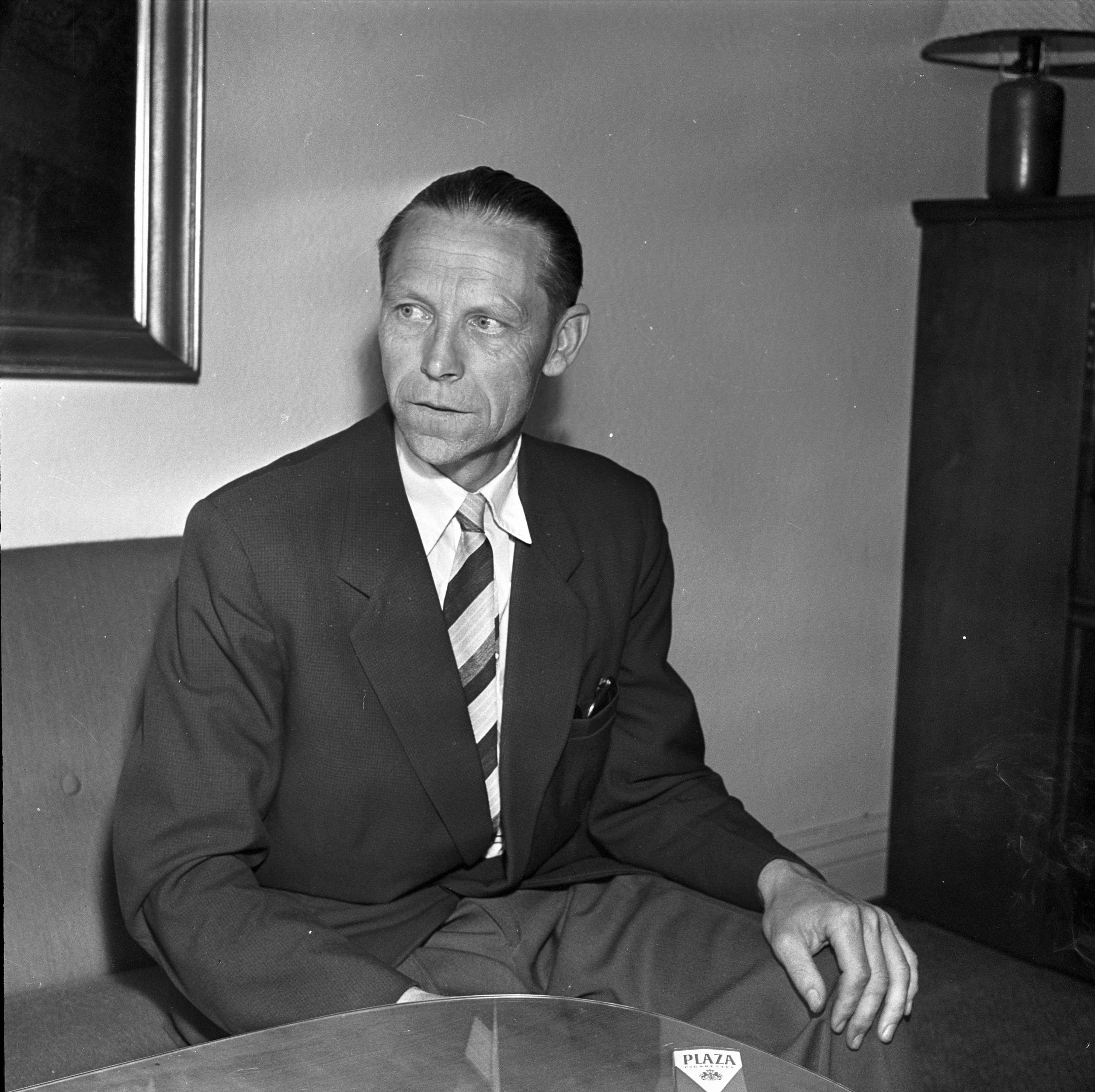
- Jan-Magnus Bruheim, 03.06.1961
- Born: 15 February 1914; Skjåk Municipality, Norway
- Died: 10 August 1988 (aged 74); Skjåk Municipality, Norway
- Occupations: Poet and children's writer
- Awards: Dobloug Prize

Jan-Magnus Bruheim ( 15 February 1914 – 10 August 1988) was a Norwegian poet and children's writer.

== Biography ==
Bruheim was born at Skjaak Municipality (later spelled Skjåk) in Kristians county, Norway. He was the son of Mathias Bruheim (1882–1967) and Torø Jonsdotter Lund (1880–1929). After graduation from gymnasium, Bruheim spent one year at Viken kristelege ungdomsskole at Gjøvik. From 1958 to 1961 he was a teacher at Øygardskulen in Skjåk.

He published over forty books including twenty poetry collections and a range of children's books with poems and rhyme. His first poetry collection was Stengd dør from 1941. Among his children's books are Skrythøna from 1956, Røyskatten from 1961, and Doggmorgon from 1977.

He was awarded the Dobloug Prize in 1963.

He died at his home in Skjåk Municipality during 1988.

== Related reading ==
- Eide, Ove, (editor), Magnhild Bruheim (illustrator) Dikt i utval. Jan-Magnus Bruheim (Skjåk kommune forlag) ISBN 9788299954303
