= Tystigbreen =

Glacier in Skjåk and Stryn, Norway

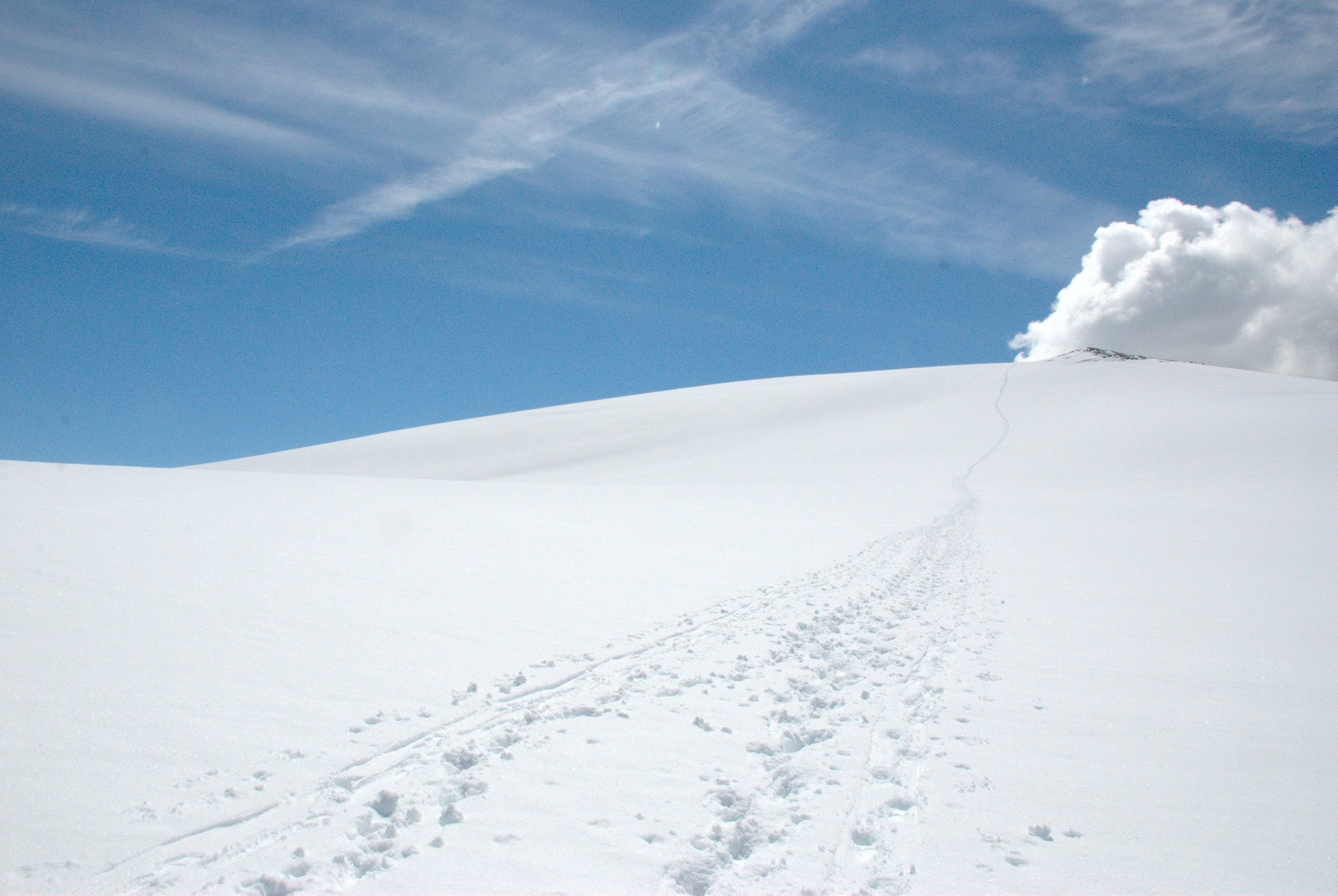
- View of the glacier
- Interactive map of the glacier
- Location: Vestland and Innlandet, Norway
- Coordinates: 61°55′N 07°22′E
- Area: 21 km^{2} (8.1 sq mi)
- Highest elevation: 1,833 metres (6,014 ft)
- Lowest elevation: 1,288 metres (4,226 ft)

Tystigbreen is a glacier in that is located in the Strynefjellet mountains of Norway. The glacier sits along the border between Stryn Municipality in Vestland county and Skjåk Municipality in Innlandet county. The 21-square-kilometre (8.1 sq mi) glacier is located about 10 kilometres (6.2 mi) east of the lake Oppstrynsvatnet. The Norwegian National Road 15 passes the northwest side of the glacier. The mountains Kvitlenova and Mårådalsfjellet lie on the east side of the glacier. A summer ski center is located at the glacier.

== See also ==
- List of glaciers in Norway
