= Skjåk Church =

Church in Innlandet, Norway

- Skjåk kyrkje
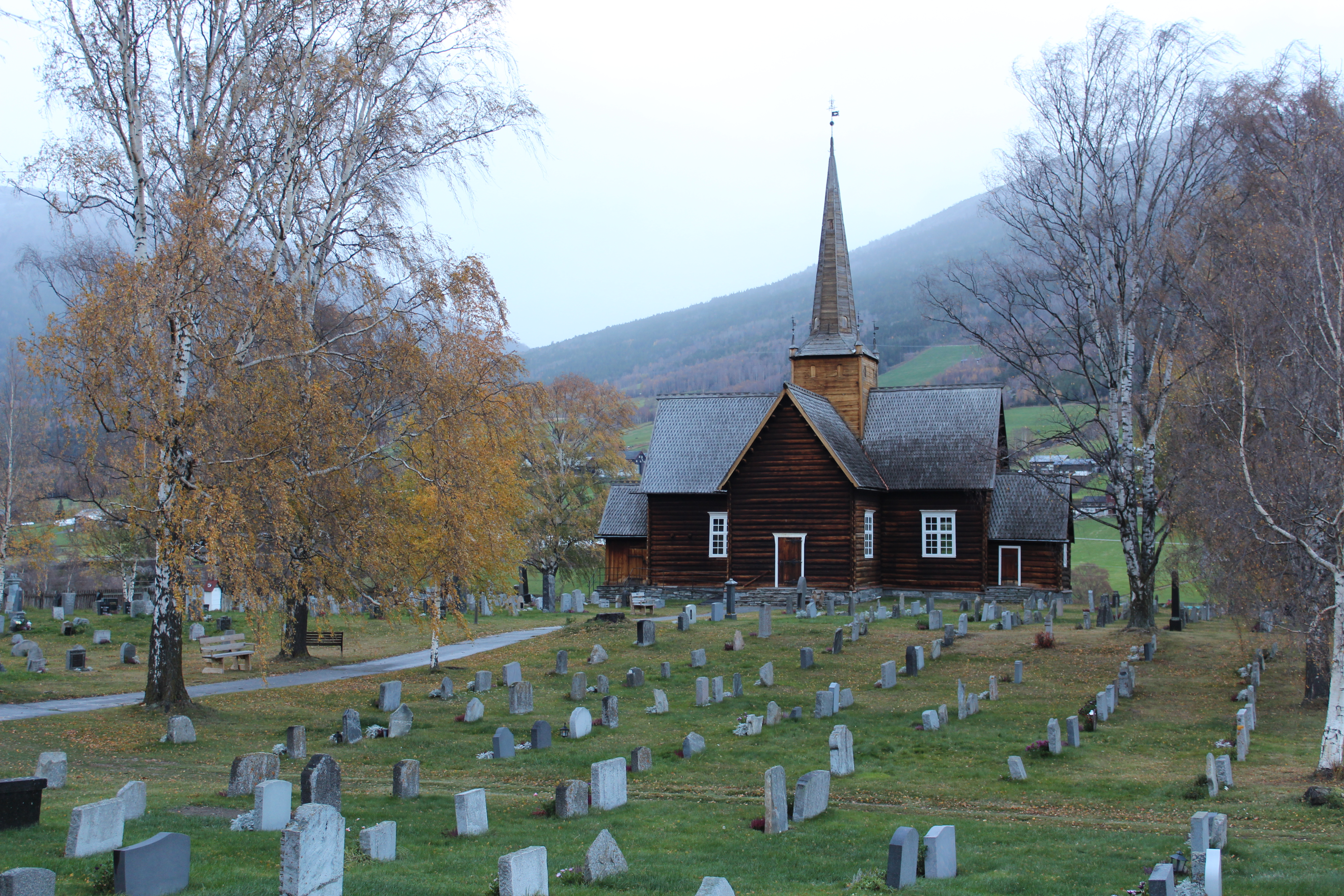
- View of the church
- Skjåk Church
- 61°52′42″N 8°22′25″E
- Location: Skjåk Municipality, Innlandet
- Country: Norway
- Denomination: Church of Norway
- Previous denomination: Catholic Church
- Churchmanship: Evangelical Lutheran

History
- Status: Parish church
- Founded: 12th century
- Consecrated: 17 Sept 1752

Architecture
- Functional status: Active
- Architect: Ola Rasmussen Hole
- Architectural type: Cruciform
- Completed: 1752 (274 years ago)

Specifications
- Capacity: 270
- Materials: Wood

Administration
- Diocese: Hamar bispedømme
- Deanery: Nord-Gudbrandsdal prosti
- Parish: Skjåk
- Norwegian Cultural Heritage Site
- Type: Church
- Status: Automatically protected
- ID: 85469

Skjåk Church (Norwegian: Skjåk kyrkje) is a parish church of the Church of Norway in Skjåk Municipality in Innlandet county, Norway. It is located in the village of Skjåk. It is the church for the Skjåk parish which is part of the Nord-Gudbrandsdal prosti (deanery) in the Diocese of Hamar. The brown, wooden church was built in an cruciform design in 1752 using plans drawn up by the architect Ola Rasmussen Hole. The church seats about 270 people.

== History ==
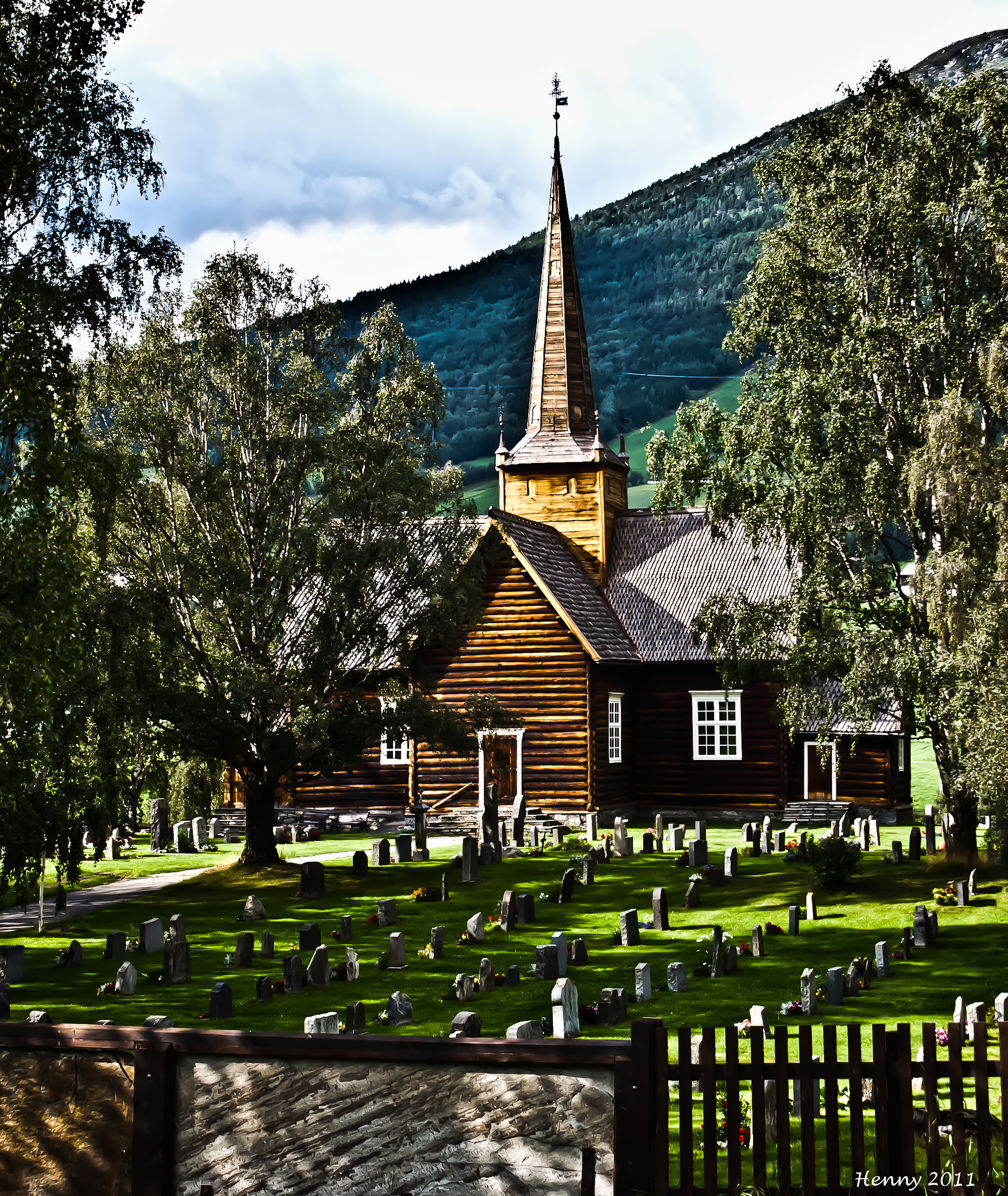
View of the church

The earliest existing historical records of the church date back to the year 1283, but the church was not new that year. The first church in Skjåk was a wooden stave church that was likely built during the 12th century. By the late 1200s, the church at Skjåk already had at least one or two annex chapels within the parish. Not much is known about this church. In 1429, the old church in Skjåk was either in poor condition or recently burned, because the Bishop Sigurd ordered that the old church be torn down and the stave church at Andvord to be taken down and moved to Skjåk to be rebuilt on the site of the old church. This new church building was also a wooden stave church and it had a small bell tower on the roof of the nave. The church had open-air corridors surrounding the church.

In 1631, the old church was torn down and a brand new timber-framed long church with a small tower. This church was in use until around 1740 when it was torn down due to its poor condition. The construction of a new Skjåk church began in 1748 under the leadership of the then 21-year-old Ola Rasmussen Hole. The new timber-framed cruciform church was completed by the summer of 1752 and it was consecrated on 17 September 1752.

== See also ==
- List of churches in Hamar
