= Rauddalsvatnet =

Lake in Skjåk, Norway

- Raudalsvatnet
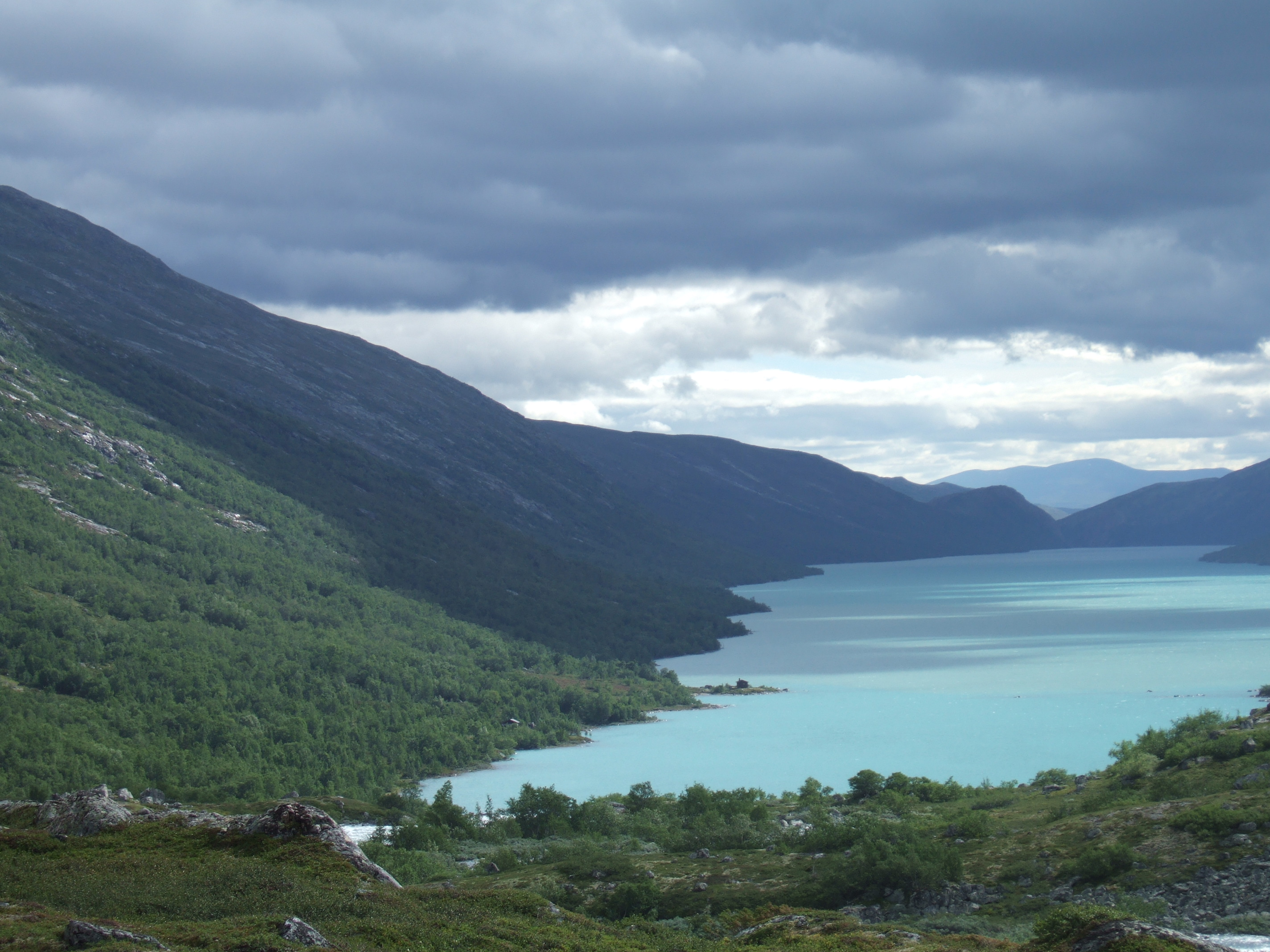
- View of the lake
- Interactive map of the lake
- Location: Skjåk Municipality, Innlandet
- Coordinates: 61.90166°N 7.64398°E
- Basin countries: Norway
- Max. length: 10.6 kilometres (6.6 mi)
- Max. width: 1 kilometre (0.62 mi)
- Surface area: 7.4977 km^{2} (2.8949 sq mi)
- Shore length^{1}: 22.23 kilometres (13.81 mi)
- Surface elevation: 916 metres (3,005 ft)
- References: NVE
- ^{1} Shore length is not a well-defined measure.

Rauddalsvatnet is a lake in Skjåk Municipality in Innlandet county, Norway. The 7.4977-square-kilometre (2.8949 sq mi) lake lies just outside the Reinheimen National Park (which surrounds the lake on three sides. The lake sits at an elevation of 916 metres (3,005 ft) above sea level and it has a perimeter of 22.23 kilometres (13.81 mi). The lake sits in a narrow valley with the mountain Skridulaupen to the north and Dyringshøi to the south. The lake lies in an isolated valley, about 25 kilometres (16 mi) west of the village of Bismo.

== See also ==
- List of lakes in Norway
