= Tverrådalskyrkja =

Mountain in Skjåk, Norway

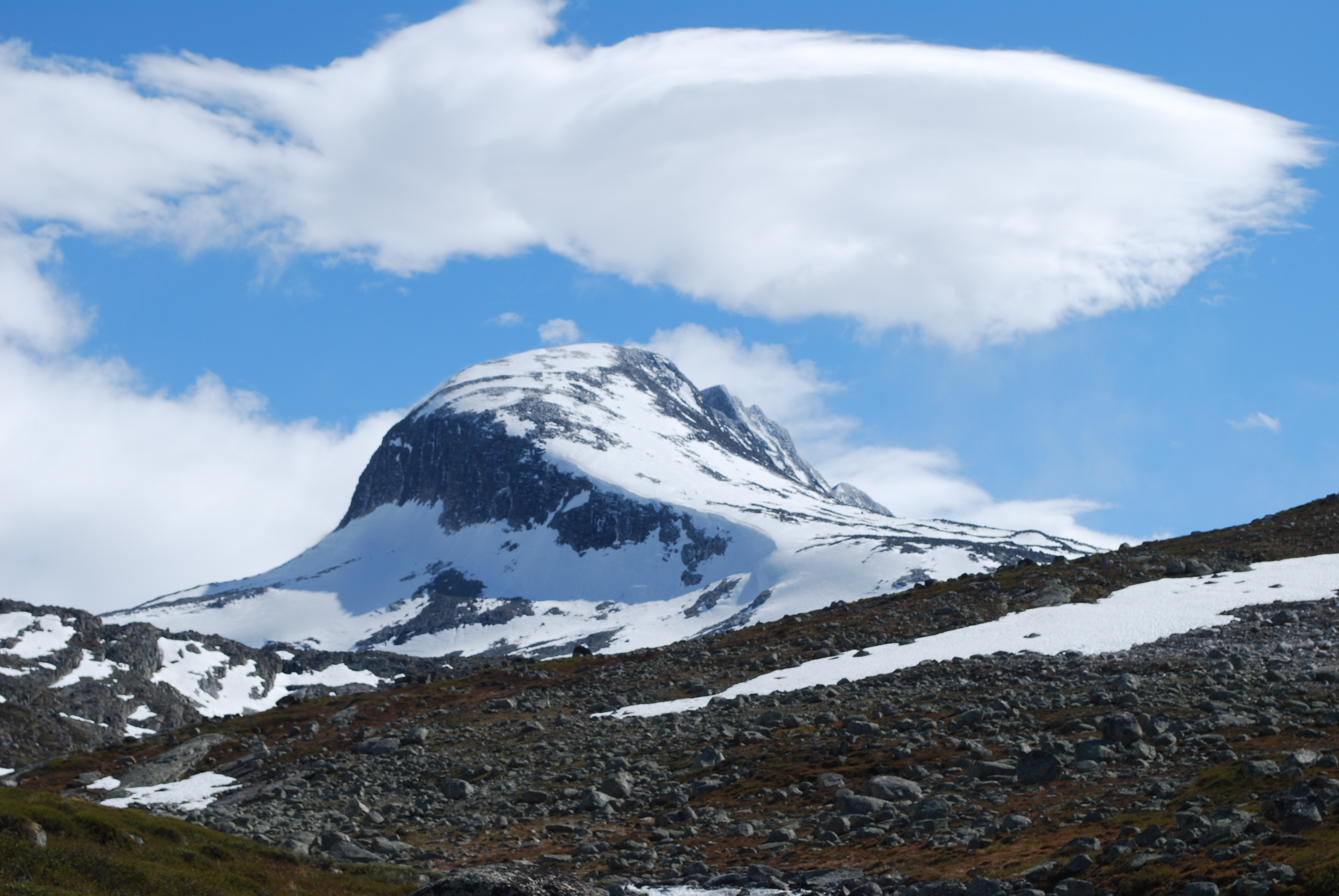
- View of the mountain

Highest point
- Elevation: 2,089 m (6,854 ft)
- Prominence: 614 m (2,014 ft)
- Isolation: 17.1 km (10.6 mi)
- Coordinates: 61°44′34″N 7°41′14″E

Geography
- Interactive map of the mountain
- Location: Innlandet and Vestland, Norway
- Parent range: Breheimen
- Topo map: 1418 II Mørkrisdalen

Climbing
- First ascent: 2 August 1842: Harald Nicolai Storm Wergeland

Tverrådalskyrkja is a mountain on the border of Skjåk Municipality in Innlandet county and Luster Municipality in Vestland county, Norway. The 2,089-metre (6,854 ft) tall mountain is located in the Breheimen mountains and inside the Breheimen National Park, just north of the large Harbardsbreen glacier. It is 23 kilometres (14 mi) north of the village of Skjolden in Luster Municipality and 33 kilometres (21 mi) southwest of Bismo in Skjåk Municipality. The mountain is surrounded by several other notable mountains including Tundradalskyrkja to the east, Holåtindan to the southeast, Røykjeskarhøi to the west, and Syrtbyttnosi to the northwest.

The 2,089-metre (6,854 ft) tall main peak is also called Store Tverrådalskyrkja. About 700 metres (2,300 ft) southwest of the main peak, there is a second peak at a height of 2,034 metres (6,673 ft), called Søre Tverrådalskyrkja.

Tverrådalskyrkja can be reached from the Norwegian Mountain Touring Association cabin Sotasæter. Usual access to the peak is over the Fortundalsbreen glacier, then along the eastern ridge.

== Name ==
The first element is the genitive of the valley name Tverrådalen. The last element is the finite form of kyrkje which means "church". (Several mountains in Norway are named Kyrkja because of some likeness in shape with a church.) The first element of the valley name is the river name Tverråa and the last element is the finite form of dal which means "dale" or "valley". The river name is a compound of tverr which means "cross" and the finite form of å which means "(small) river"—thus it is a "side river" (to a bigger river).

Store Tverrådalskyrkja means "The Big Tverrådalskyrkja" and Søre Tverrådalskyrkja means "The Southern Tverrådalskyrkja".

== See also ==
- List of mountains of Norway
