= Grotli =

Village in Skjåk, Norway

- Village
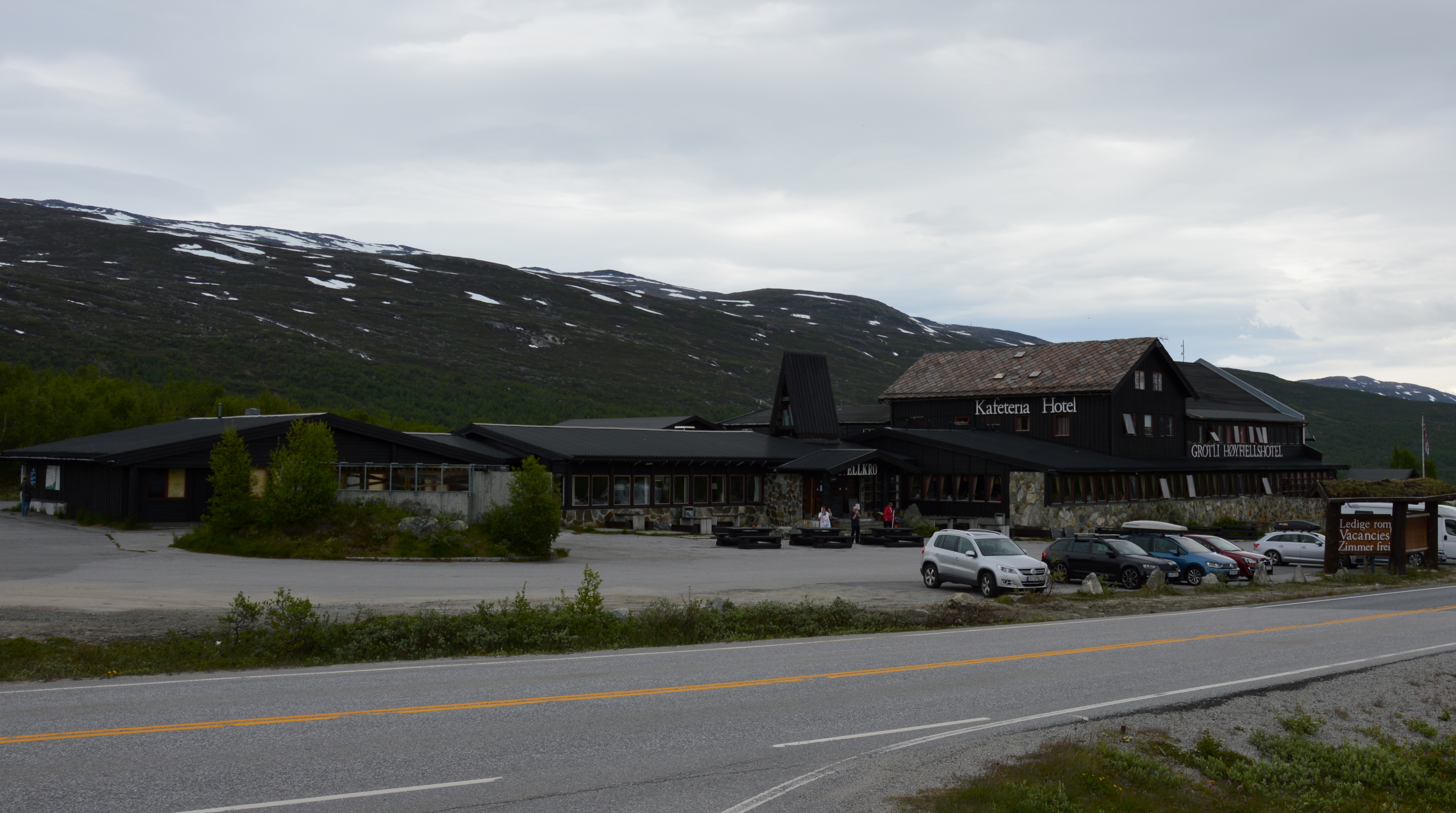
- View of the village hotel
- Interactive map of Grotli
- Location within Innlandet Location within Norway
- Coordinates: 62.01351°N 7.63037°E
- Country: Norway
- Region: Eastern Norway
- County: Innlandet
- District: Gudbrandsdalen
- Municipality: Skjåk Municipality
- Elevation: 908 m (2,979 ft)
- Time zone: UTC+01:00 (CET)
  - Summer (DST): UTC+02:00 (CEST)
- Post Code: 2695 Grotli

Grotli is a village in Skjåk Municipality in Innlandet county, Norway. The village is located in the Billingsdalen valley at the east end of the lake Breiddalsvatnet, about 40 kilometres (25 mi) west of the village of Bismo. The area has a hotel and skiing centre as well as a few permanent residents and a number of holiday cottages. The Norwegian National Road 15 runs through the village.
