= Skjåk Municipality =

Municipality in Innlandet, Norway

Skjåk Municipality Skjåk kommune
- Municipality
- Skjaak herred (historic name); Skiaaker herred (historic name); Skiaker herred (historic name)
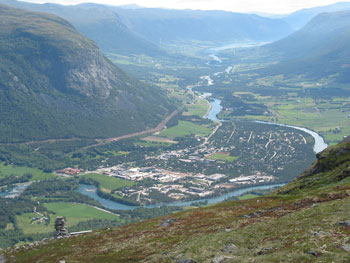

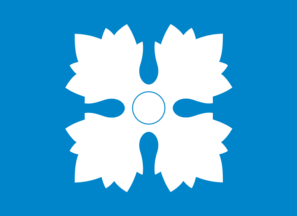
- Flag Coat of arms

- Innlandet within Norway

- Skjåk within Innlandet
- Coordinates: 61°56′10″N 7°57′37″E
- Country: Norway
- County: Innlandet
- District: Gudbrandsdalen
- Established: 1 January 1866
  - Preceded by: Lom Municipality
- Administrative centre: Bismo

Government
  - Mayor (2019): Edel Kveen (Sp)

Area
  - Total: 2,075.51 km^{2} (801.36 sq mi)
  - Land: 1,965.05 km^{2} (758.71 sq mi)
  - Water: 110.46 km^{2} (42.65 sq mi) 5.3%
  - Rank: #33 in Norway
- Highest elevation: 2,171.79 m (7,125.3 ft)

Population (2025)
  - Total: 2,179
  - Rank: #273 in Norway
  - Density: 1/km^{2} (2.6/sq mi)
  - Change (10 years): ▼ −5.4%
- Demonym: Skjåkvær

Official language
  - Norwegian form: Nynorsk
- Time zone: UTC+01:00 (CET)
  - Summer (DST): UTC+02:00 (CEST)
- ISO 3166 code: NO-3433
- Website: Official website

Skjåk is a municipality in Innlandet county, Norway. It is located in the traditional district of Gudbrandsdal. The administrative centre of the municipality is the village of Bismo. Most of the municipal residents live in the Billingsdalen and Ottadalen valleys along the river Otta. The local newspaper is named Fjuken.

The 2,075.5-square-kilometre (801.4 sq mi) municipality is the 33rd largest by area out of the 357 municipalities in Norway. Skjåk Municipality is the 273rd most populous municipality in Norway with a population of 2,179. The municipality's population density is 1 inhabitant per square kilometre (2.6/sq mi) and its population has decreased by 5.4% over the previous 10-year period.

== General information ==
The municipality of Skjåk was established on 1 January 1866 when the large Lom Municipality was divided and the western part of the municipality (population: 2,691) became the new Skjåk Municipality (historically spelled Skiaker Municipality). The eastern part of the municipality (population: 3,299) remained as Lom Municipality. The borders of the municipality have never changed.

Historically, the municipality was part of the old Oppland county. On 1 January 2020, the municipality became a part of the newly-formed Innlandet county (after Hedmark and Oppland counties were merged).

=== Name ===
The municipality (originally the parish) is named after the old Skjåk farm (Old Norse: Skeiðakr) since the first Skjåk Church was built there. The first element comes from the word skeið which means "a running track for horse racing". The last element is akr which means "field" or "acre". Prior to 1889, the name was written "Skiaker", then from 1889 to 1910 it was spelled "Skiaaker". On 4 June 1910, a royal resolution changed the spelling of the name of the municipality to Skjaak, to give the name a more Norwegian and less Danish spelling due to Norwegian language reforms. On 21 December 1917, a royal resolution enacted the 1917 Norwegian language reforms. Prior to this change, the name was spelled with the digraph "aa", and after this reform, the letter å was used instead (Skjåk).

=== Coat of arms ===
The coat of arms was granted on 31 March 1989. The official blazon is "Azure, an acanthus quatrefoil argent" (Norwegian: På blå grunn eit sølv firblad). This means the arms have a blue field (background) and the charge is four acanthus leaves connected in the centre. The charge has a tincture of argent which means it is commonly colored white, but if it is made out of metal, then silver is used. This design was chosen to symbolize growth and strength. These symbols are found in many historic artifacts from around the area. The arms were designed by Arvid Sveen. The municipal flag has the same design as the coat of arms.

=== Churches ===
The Church of Norway has two parishes (sokn) within Skjåk Municipality. It is part of the Nord-Gudbrandsdal prosti (deanery) in the Diocese of Hamar.

Churches in Skjåk Municipality
Parish (sokn)	Church name	Location of the church	Year built
Nordberg	Nordberg Church	Nordberg	1864
Skjåk	Skjåk Church	Bismo	1752

== Geography ==
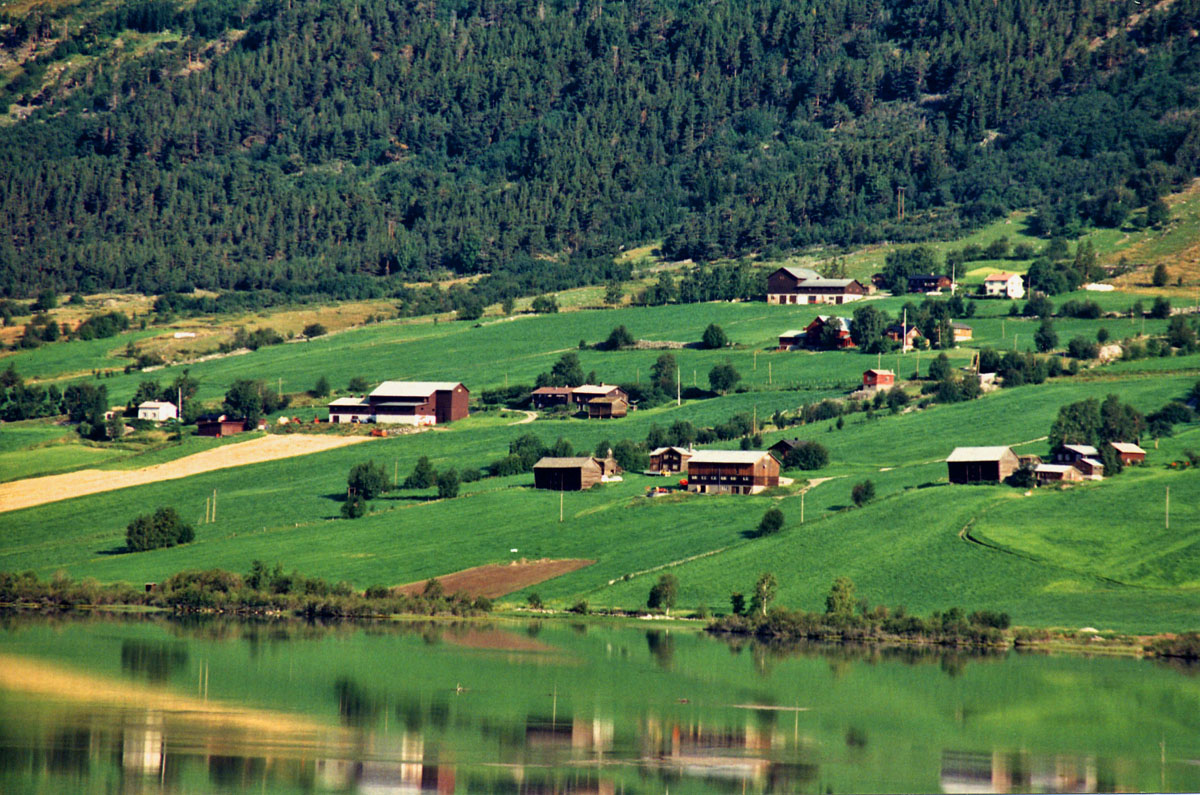
View of the "sunny side" of Skjåk

Skjåk Municipality is the westernmost municipality in the Ottadalen valley. It is bordered to the north by Fjord Municipality, Rauma Municipality, and Lesja Municipality, in the east and southeast by Lom Municipality, in the south by Luster Municipality and in the west by Stryn Municipality and Stranda Municipality. The municipality lies along the Otta river between the mountainous areas of Breheim and Reinheim. Bismo is the modern population center and the location of the majority of industry and shopping as well as the municipal administration.

The community is at the meeting point between Gudbrandsdalen and the mountains between the eastern parts of Norway and the west coast. The municipality lies on a historically significant traffic artery between Stryn and Nordfjord, Geiranger, and Sunnmøre and the more easterly Ottadal municipalities of Lom and Vågå. The Breheimen National Park and Reinheimen National Park are both located in the municipality.

Of the total area, 19 square kilometres (7.3 mi^{2}) is used for agriculture; 129 square kilometres (50 mi^{2}) for forestry; 75 square kilometres (29 mi^{2}) is covered by water (including the Breiddalsvatnet lake); and the rest is mountains and other non-arable land. Virtually the entire 23-kilometre (14 mi) long valley floor is continuously, but sparsely, built up. Skjåk serves as a point of entry to the mountain areas just west; hunting and fishing are also popular tourist activities. The municipality includes a number of large lakes including Aursjoen, Breiddalsvatnet, Grønvatnet, Langvatnet, Rauddalsvatn, and Tordsvatnet. The Breheimen mountains run through the municipality and the Holåbreen and Tystigbreen glaciers are located in those mountains. The highest point in the municipality is the 2,171.79-metre (7,125.3 ft) tall mountain Nørdre Hestbreapiggen.

=== Climate ===
The Ottadalen valley is heavily rain shadowed and one of the driest areas in Northern Europe with annual precipitation down to about 300 millimetres (12 in) per year. The weather station at Øygarden (374 m) in the very east of Skjåk receives a mere 298 mm annually (1991-2020 normals) and ranks as the second-driest location at the Norwegian mainland. The climate here is subarctic (Köppen Dsc), characterized by cold winters and mild summers.

In addition, one side of the valley, solsida ("the sunny side"), has a southern exposure, whereas baksida (the "back side") gets very little sun. Agriculture has been enabled by elaborate irrigation systems for hundreds of years, so the area is green and productive rather than desert-like.

Climate data for Skjåk, Oppland, elevation: 372 m or 1,220 ft, 1961-1990 normals, extremes 1970–1987
Month	Jan	Feb	Mar	Apr	May	Jun	Jul	Aug	Sep	Oct	Nov	Dec	Year
Record high °C (°F)	12.4 (54.3)	10.2 (50.4)	12.6 (54.7)	19.7 (67.5)	24.8 (76.6)	30.3 (86.5)	30.2 (86.4)	32.2 (90.0)	22.5 (72.5)	19.3 (66.7)	14.1 (57.4)	10.6 (51.1)	32.2 (90.0)
Mean maximum °C (°F)	6.4 (43.5)	5.9 (42.6)	8.2 (46.8)	13.8 (56.8)	22.1 (71.8)	25.7 (78.3)	27.5 (81.5)	25.3 (77.5)	19.3 (66.7)	14.8 (58.6)	9.7 (49.5)	8.5 (47.3)	28.6 (83.5)
Mean daily maximum °C (°F)	−6.0 (21.2)	−4.7 (23.5)	1.9 (35.4)	7.4 (45.3)	14.7 (58.5)	18.2 (64.8)	19.9 (67.8)	18.5 (65.3)	12.7 (54.9)	6.8 (44.2)	0.4 (32.7)	−2.6 (27.3)	7.3 (45.1)
Daily mean °C (°F)	−9.4 (15.1)	−8.2 (17.2)	−2.7 (27.1)	2.7 (36.9)	8.5 (47.3)	12.7 (54.9)	13.9 (57.0)	12.8 (55.0)	8.4 (47.1)	3.8 (38.8)	−2.9 (26.8)	−6.6 (20.1)	2.8 (36.9)
Mean daily minimum °C (°F)	−13.5 (7.7)	−13.1 (8.4)	−6.8 (19.8)	−2.0 (28.4)	2.7 (36.9)	6.7 (44.1)	8.6 (47.5)	7.6 (45.7)	3.9 (39.0)	0.3 (32.5)	−6.1 (21.0)	−10.0 (14.0)	−1.8 (28.8)
Mean minimum °C (°F)	−27.8 (−18.0)	−25.7 (−14.3)	−17.8 (0.0)	−10.2 (13.6)	−4.5 (23.9)	0.4 (32.7)	2.9 (37.2)	0.8 (33.4)	−3.6 (25.5)	−8.7 (16.3)	−17.7 (0.1)	−21.6 (−6.9)	−30.1 (−22.2)
Record low °C (°F)	−40.0 (−40.0)	−35.7 (−32.3)	−25.5 (−13.9)	−15.9 (3.4)	−7.5 (18.5)	−2.8 (27.0)	0.5 (32.9)	−1.8 (28.8)	−8.0 (17.6)	−18.9 (−2.0)	−25.3 (−13.5)	−38.0 (−36.4)	−40.0 (−40.0)
Average precipitation mm (inches)	20 (0.8)	12 (0.5)	12 (0.5)	5 (0.2)	15 (0.6)	28 (1.1)	43 (1.7)	35 (1.4)	30 (1.2)	32 (1.3)	23 (0.9)	24 (0.9)	279 (11.1)
Average extreme snow depth cm (inches)	17 (6.7)	16 (6.3)	12 (4.7)	4 (1.6)	0 (0)	0 (0)	0 (0)	0 (0)	0 (0)	2 (0.8)	9 (3.5)	17 (6.7)	25 (9.8)
Average precipitation days (≥ 1.0 mm)	6	3	3	2	4	6	9	8	8	7	8	7	71
Source: Meteorologisk institutt

== History ==
Number of minorities (1st and 2nd generation) in Skjåk by country of origin in 2017
Ancestry	Number
Eritrea	40
Poland	26
Russia	8
Germany	3

Skjåk has historical roots back to the Viking Age and has a rich cultural heritage. An ancient route of travel between east and west went from Skjåk up through the Raudal valley and down through the Sunndal valley to Stryn Municipality on an arm of the Nordfjord. For example, in 1197, according to King Sverre's saga, Bishop Nikolaus is reported to have sent a group of baglers from Oppdal over the mountains to Stryn on Nordfjord, via Raudal.

== Government ==
Skjåk Municipality is responsible for primary education (through 10th grade), outpatient health services, senior citizen services, welfare and other social services, zoning, economic development, and municipal roads and utilities. The municipality is governed by a municipal council of directly elected representatives. The mayor is indirectly elected by a vote of the municipal council. The municipality is under the jurisdiction of the Gudbrandsdal District Court and the Eidsivating Court of Appeal.

=== Municipal council ===
The municipal council (Kommunestyre) of Skjåk Municipality is made up of 17 representatives that are elected to four year terms. The tables below show the current and historical composition of the council by political party.

Skjåk kommunestyre 2023–2027
Party name (in Nynorsk)	Number of representatives
Labour Party (Arbeidarpartiet)	3
Centre Party (Senterpartiet)	9
Local list in Skjåk (Bygdalist i Skjåk)	5
Total number of members:	17

Skjåk kommunestyre 2019–2023
Party name (in Nynorsk)	Number of representatives
Labour Party (Arbeidarpartiet)	4
Centre Party (Senterpartiet)	11
Local list in Skjåk (Bygdalist i Skjåk)	2
Total number of members:	17

Skjåk kommunestyre 2015–2019
Party name (in Nynorsk)	Number of representatives
Labour Party (Arbeidarpartiet)	9
Centre Party (Senterpartiet)	12
Total number of members:	21

Skjåk kommunestyre 2011–2015
Party name (in Nynorsk)	Number of representatives
Labour Party (Arbeidarpartiet)	8
Centre Party (Senterpartiet)	10
Local list in Skjåk (Bygdalist i Skjåk)	3
Total number of members:	21

Skjåk kommunestyre 2007–2011
Party name (in Nynorsk)	Number of representatives
Labour Party (Arbeidarpartiet)	8
Centre Party (Senterpartiet)	10
Local list in Skjåk (Bygdalist i Skjåk)	3
Total number of members:	21

Skjåk kommunestyre 2003–2007
Party name (in Nynorsk)	Number of representatives
Labour Party (Arbeidarpartiet)	5
Conservative Party (Høgre)	1
Centre Party (Senterpartiet)	12
Local list in Skjåk (Bygdalist i Skjåk)	3
Total number of members:	21

Skjåk kommunestyre 1999–2003
Party name (in Nynorsk)	Number of representatives
Labour Party (Arbeidarpartiet)	5
Conservative Party (Høgre)	1
Centre Party (Senterpartiet)	11
Local list in Skjåk (Bygdalist i Skjåk)	4
Total number of members:	21

Skjåk kommunestyre 1995–1999
Party name (in Nynorsk)	Number of representatives
Labour Party (Arbeidarpartiet)	4
Centre Party (Senterpartiet)	14
Local list in Skjåk (Bygdalista i Skjåk)	3
Total number of members:	21

Skjåk kommunestyre 1991–1995
Party name (in Nynorsk)	Number of representatives
Labour Party (Arbeidarpartiet)	9
Conservative Party (Høgre)	1
Centre Party (Senterpartiet)	9
Local list in Skjåk (Bygdalista i Skjåk)	2
Total number of members:	21

Skjåk kommunestyre 1987–1991
Party name (in Nynorsk)	Number of representatives
Labour Party (Arbeidarpartiet)	10
Conservative Party (Høgre)	1
Centre Party (Senterpartiet)	8
Local list for Skjåk (Bygdeliste for Skjåk)	2
Total number of members:	21

Skjåk kommunestyre 1983–1987
Party name (in Nynorsk)	Number of representatives
Labour Party (Arbeidarpartiet)	11
Conservative Party (Høgre)	1
Centre Party (Senterpartiet)	7
Local list for Skjåk (Bygdeliste for Skjåk)	2
Total number of members:	21

Skjåk kommunestyre 1979–1983
Party name (in Nynorsk)	Number of representatives
Labour Party (Arbeidarpartiet)	10
Conservative Party (Høgre)	1
Centre Party (Senterpartiet)	8
Local list for Skjåk (Bygdeliste for Skjåk)	2
Total number of members:	21

Skjåk kommunestyre 1975–1979
Party name (in Nynorsk)	Number of representatives
Labour Party (Arbeidarpartiet)	10
Centre Party (Senterpartiet)	9
Local list for Skjåk (Bygdeliste for Skjåk)	1
Free voters' list (Frie Veljarar)	1
Total number of members:	21

Skjåk kommunestyre 1971–1975
Party name (in Nynorsk)	Number of representatives
Labour Party (Arbeidarpartiet)	10
Centre Party (Senterpartiet)	7
Local List(s) (Lokale lister)	4
Total number of members:	21

Skjåk kommunestyre 1967–1971
Party name (in Nynorsk)	Number of representatives
Labour Party (Arbeidarpartiet)	10
Centre Party (Senterpartiet)	6
Local List(s) (Lokale lister)	5
Total number of members:	21

Skjåk kommunestyre 1963–1967
Party name (in Nynorsk)	Number of representatives
Labour Party (Arbeidarpartiet)	9
Centre Party (Senterpartiet)	7
Local List(s) (Lokale lister)	5
Total number of members:	21

Skjåk heradsstyre 1959–1963
Party name (in Nynorsk)	Number of representatives
Labour Party (Arbeidarpartiet)	10
Centre Party (Senterpartiet)	9
Liberal Party (Venstre)	2
Total number of members:	21

Skjåk heradsstyre 1955–1959
Party name (in Nynorsk)	Number of representatives
Labour Party (Arbeidarpartiet)	12
Farmers' Party (Bondepartiet)	8
Local List(s) (Lokale lister)	1
Total number of members:	21

Skjåk heradsstyre 1951–1955
Party name (in Nynorsk)	Number of representatives
Labour Party (Arbeidarpartiet)	10
Joint List(s) of Non-Socialist Parties (Borgarlege Felleslister)	10
Total number of members:	20

Skjåk heradsstyre 1947–1951
Party name (in Nynorsk)	Number of representatives
Labour Party (Arbeidarpartiet)	10
Farmers' Party (Bondepartiet)	6
Joint list of the Liberal Party (Venstre) and the Radical People's Party (Radikale Folkepartiet)	1
Joint List(s) of Non-Socialist Parties (Borgarlege Felleslister)	3
Total number of members:	20

Skjåk heradsstyre 1945–1947
Party name (in Nynorsk)	Number of representatives
Labour Party (Arbeidarpartiet)	11
Joint List(s) of Non-Socialist Parties (Borgarlege Felleslister)	3
Local List(s) (Lokale lister)	6
Total number of members:	20

Skjåk heradsstyre 1937–1941*
Party name (in Nynorsk)	Number of representatives
Labour Party (Arbeidarpartiet)	13
Farmers' Party (Bondepartiet)	7
Total number of members:	20
Note: Due to the German occupation of Norway during World War II, no elections were held for new municipal councils until after the war ended in 1945.

=== Mayors ===
The mayor (Nynorsk: ordførar) of Skjåk Municipality is the political leader of the municipality and the chairperson of the municipal council. Here is a list of people who have held this position:

- 1866–1875: Otto Ottesen
- 1876–1877: Ola Lund
- 1878–1881: Jon J. Kjeka
- 1882–1883: Kristian A. Hjeltar
- 1884–1885: Ola O. Hyrve
- 1886–1889: Ola Lund
- 1890–1891: Ola O. Skjåk
- 1892–1893: Kristian A. Hjeltar
- 1894–1897: Lars Ånstad
- 1898–1901: Ola O. Skjåk
- 1902–1904: Lars Ånstad
- 1905–1907: Rasmus Haugen
- 1908–1910: Ola O. Ånstad
- 1911–1913: Erik Kvale
- 1914–1916: Kolbein Skaare
- 1917–1919: Johannes Kjeken
- 1920–1922: Kolbein Skaare
- 1923–1925: Olav Øygard
- 1926–1928: Ola F. Gjeilo
- 1929–1931: Olav Øygard
- 1932–1934: Ola F. Gjeilo
- 1935–1941: Ole O. Langleite (Ap)
- 1941–1945: Gudbrand Skjaak (NS)
- 1945–1951: Ole O. Langleite (Ap)
- 1952–1955: Trygve Bakke (Bp)
- 1956–1959: Ole Langleite (Ap)
- 1960–1971: Trygve Bakke (Sp)
- 1972–1983: Hans Krogstad (Sp)
- 1984–1987: Åge Willy Rønningen (Ap)
- 1988–1995: Margit Grimstad Lien (Sp)
- 1996–2003: Hans Krogstad (Sp)
- 2003–2007: Ola Stensgård (Sp)
- 2007–2015: Rolv Kristen Øygard (Sp)
- 2015–2019: Elias Sperstad (Sp)
- 2019–present: Edel Kveen (Sp)

== Notable people ==
- Skjåk-Ola, (Norwegian Wiki) (1744 in Skjåk - 1803), a wood carver whose real name was Ola Rasmussen Skjåk
- Tore Ørjasæter (1886 in Skjåk – 1968), an educator, literature critic, author, and poet
- Jan-Magnus Bruheim (1914 in Skjåk – 1988), a poet and children's writer
- Magnhild Bruheim, (Norwegian Wiki) (born 1951 in Skjåk), an author and journalist
- Rune Øygard (born 1959 in Skjåk), a former politician and convicted paedophile
- Trond Bersu (born 1984 in Skjåk), a drummer and producer
