= Lesja =

Lesja may refer to:

== People ==
- Lesja Ukrajinka, a Ukrainian writer

== Places ==
- Lesja Municipality, a municipality in Innlandet county, Norway
- Lesja (village), a village within Lesja Municipality in Innlandet county, Norway
- Lesja Church, a church in Lesja Municipality in Innlandet county, Norway
- Lesja Station, a railway station in Lesja Municipality in Innlandet county, Norway

== Other ==
- Lesja Iron Works, an ironworks in Lesja Municipality in Innlandet county, Norway
- Lesja murder case, a murder case from Lesja Municipality in Innlandet county, Norway

== See also ==
- Lesya (disambiguation)
