= Ragnvald Einbu =

Norwegian woodcarver and painter

Ragnvald Pedersson Einbu (January 10, 1870 – July 4, 1943) was a Norwegian woodcarver and painter.

Einbu was born in Lesja Municipality, the son of Peder Johannesson Einbu and Marit Syversdotter Enebo. He was the brother of astronomer Sigurd Einbu (1866–1946). In 1915 he married Berta Marie Martinusdatter (1888–1974).

Einbu is known principally for having decorated church interiors in several places in Norway and for a wide range of decoration tasks in public buildings and private homes. In 1896, he attended the Norwegian National Academy of Craft and Art Industry. He subsequently came in contact with Anders Sandvig at Maihaugen and worked with the decorations in connection with the restoration of the Isum Chapel (Isum kapell) from Sør-Fron Municipality which was completed in 1910. Einbu died in Lesja.

== Selected works ==
- Fåberg Church in Lillehammer Municipality: altar carvings restoration, (1931–1932)
- Hov Church in Søndre Land Municipality: pulpit canopy
- Kvam Church in Nord-Fron Municipality: altar carving restoration (1923)
- Kvikne Church in Nord-Fron Municipality: pew box painting, (1922)
- Lesja Church in Lesja Municipality: gallery painting, pew box painting, ceiling painting (1925, 1931, and 1936)
- Ringebu Stave Church in Ringebu Municipality: wall paintings, 1921
- Vingelen Church in Tolga Municipality: interior, picture frames, (1925–1926)

== Other sources ==
- Nørstegård, Tor (2008). Ragnvald Einbu multikunstner og bestefar (in Norwegian). Snøhetta Forlag A/S. ISBN 9788291375243.
