= Jakob Klukstad =

Norwegian wood carver and painter

Jakob Bersveinson Klukstad (1705–1773) was a Norwegian wood carver and painter. He influenced other woodcarvers within the Gudbrandsdalen valley.

== Biography ==
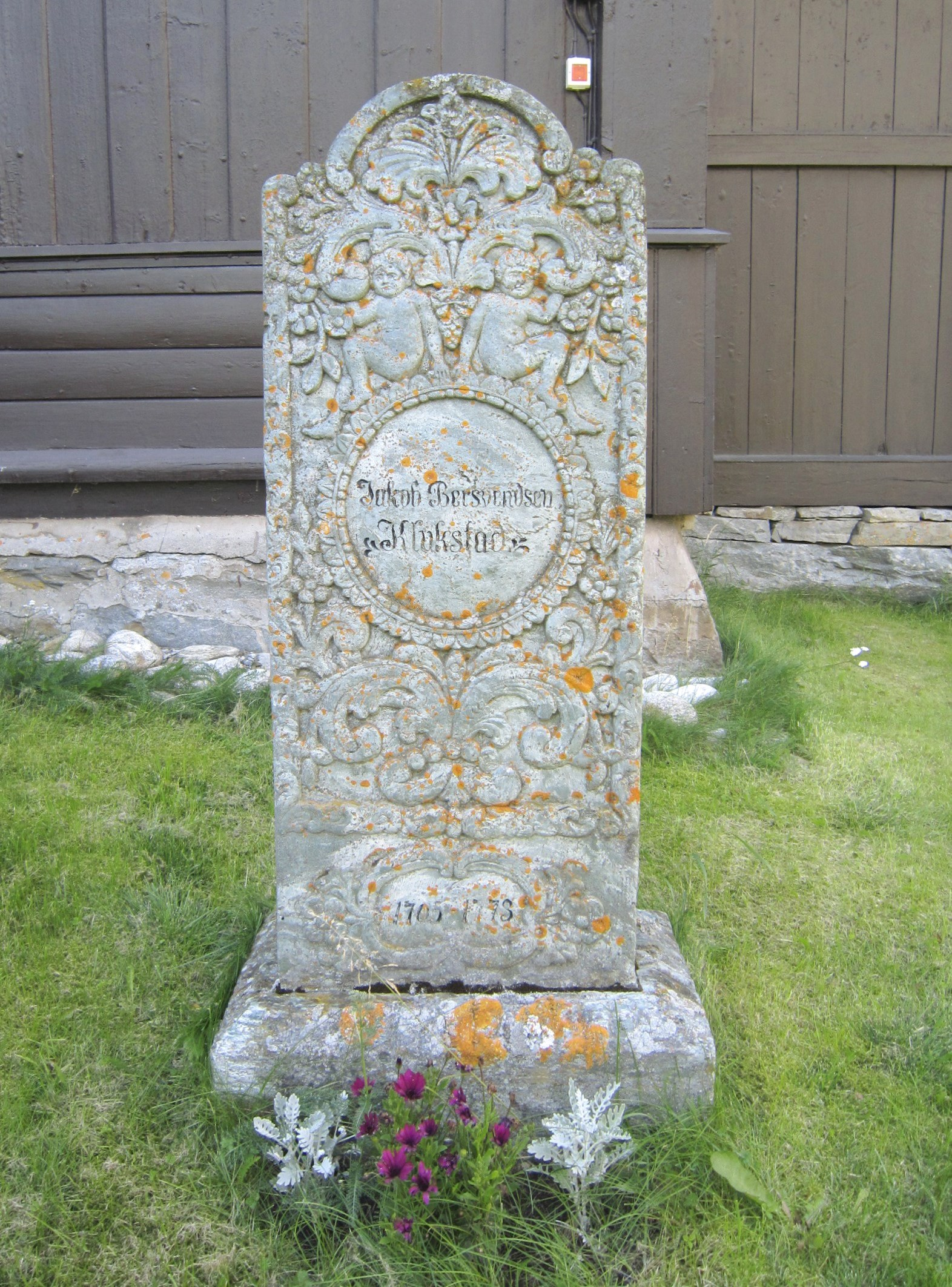
Klukstad's grave marker in Lesja

Klukstad was born in Lom. He spent most of his career on the Klukstad farm in what is now Lesja Municipality. In 1734 he married Anne Knutsdatter (1704-1766) from Lom. Beginning in 1746 they are recorded as taking communion at the church in Lesja, where they continued for years afterwards. In 1747 Klukstad was recorded as holding a cotter's farm that was attached to the larger farm of Nordistugu Klukstad in Lesja. He was buried at Lesja Church, where a memorial stone recognizing his work was placed at his grave in 2000.

Klukstad was a self-taught artist. His main artistic contribution came at churches in the Gudbrand Valley, where he received several major commissions. His altarpieces and pulpits were richly carved with motifs of continuous vines with large-leaved acanthus or smaller, curly and small-lobed foliage. Some of the works have a wealth of small and large flowers, palmettes and leaf limes with great variety in the details.

Klukstad's great masterpieces are the altarpiece at Lesja Church (1742–45) and the pulpit and altarpiece in Heidal Church (1753–54). Klukstad's work can also be seen at Skjåk Church (ca. 1750) and Kors Church in Romsdal (1769).

== Other sources ==
- Kleiven, Ivar (1973) Gamal bondekultur i Gudbrandsdalen: Lom og Skjaak (H. Aschehoug & Co.) ISBN 978-82-03-05951-3
- Stagg, Frank Noel (1956) The heart of Norway: A history of the central provinces (Allen & Unwin)
