= DN Geminorum =

Star in the constellation Gemini

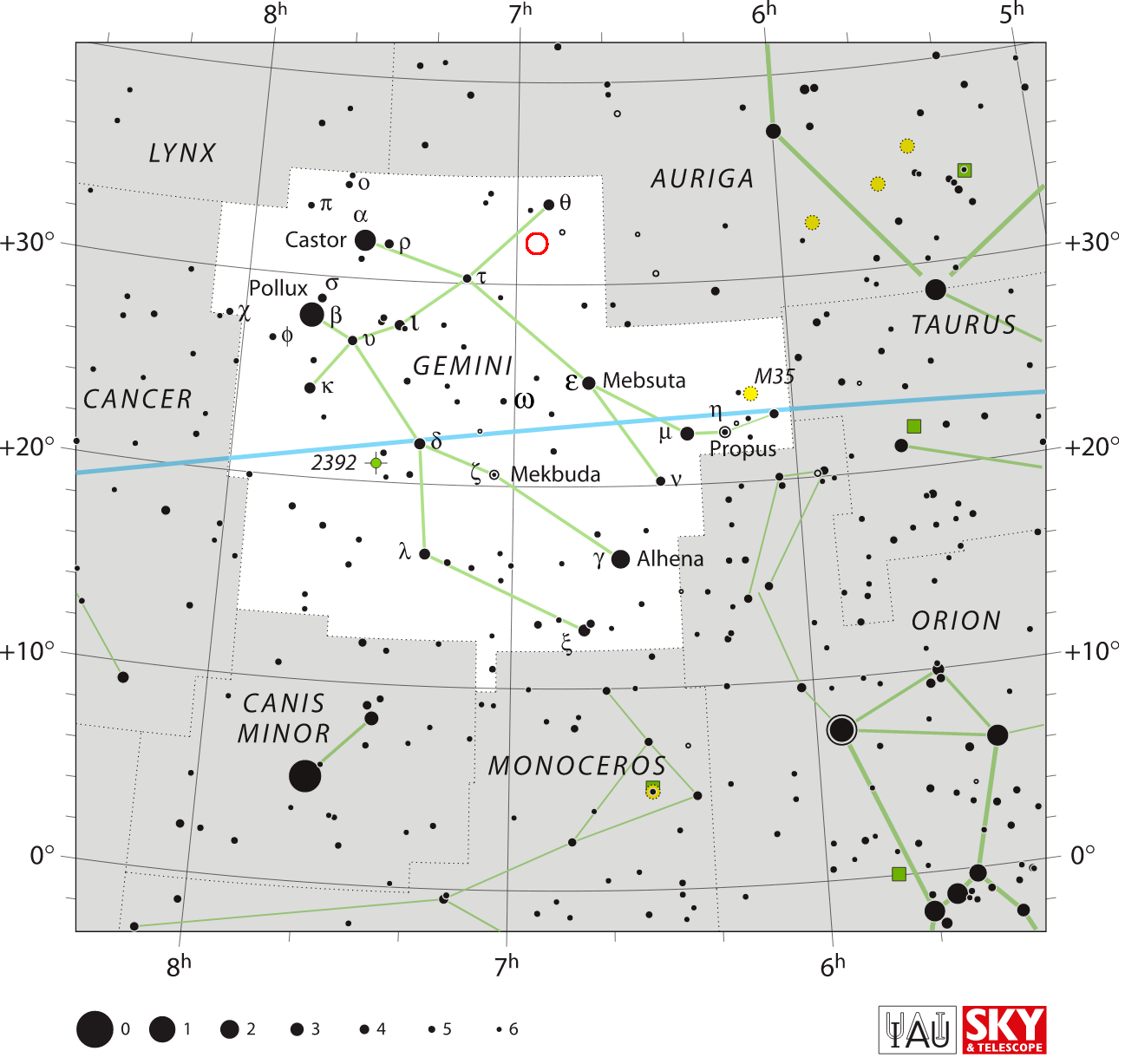
- Location of DN Geminorum (circled in red)

Observation data Epoch J2000 Equinox J2000
- Constellation: Gemini
- Right ascension: 06^{h} 54^{m} 54.34929^{s}
- Declination: +32° 08′ 27.9247″
- Apparent magnitude (V): 15.5±0.5

Astrometry
| Proper motion (μ) | RA: −0.794 mas/yr Dec.: −4.323 mas/yr |
| Parallax (π) | 0.7288±0.0807 mas |
| Distance | approx. 4,500 ly (approx. 1,400 pc) |
| Absolute magnitude (M_{V}) | 5.02±0.60 |

Details

White dwarf
| Mass | 0.93±0.15 M_{☉} |

Other designations
- Nova Gem 1912, Nova Geminorum II, DN Gem, AAVSO 0648+32, HD 50480

Database references
| SIMBAD | data |

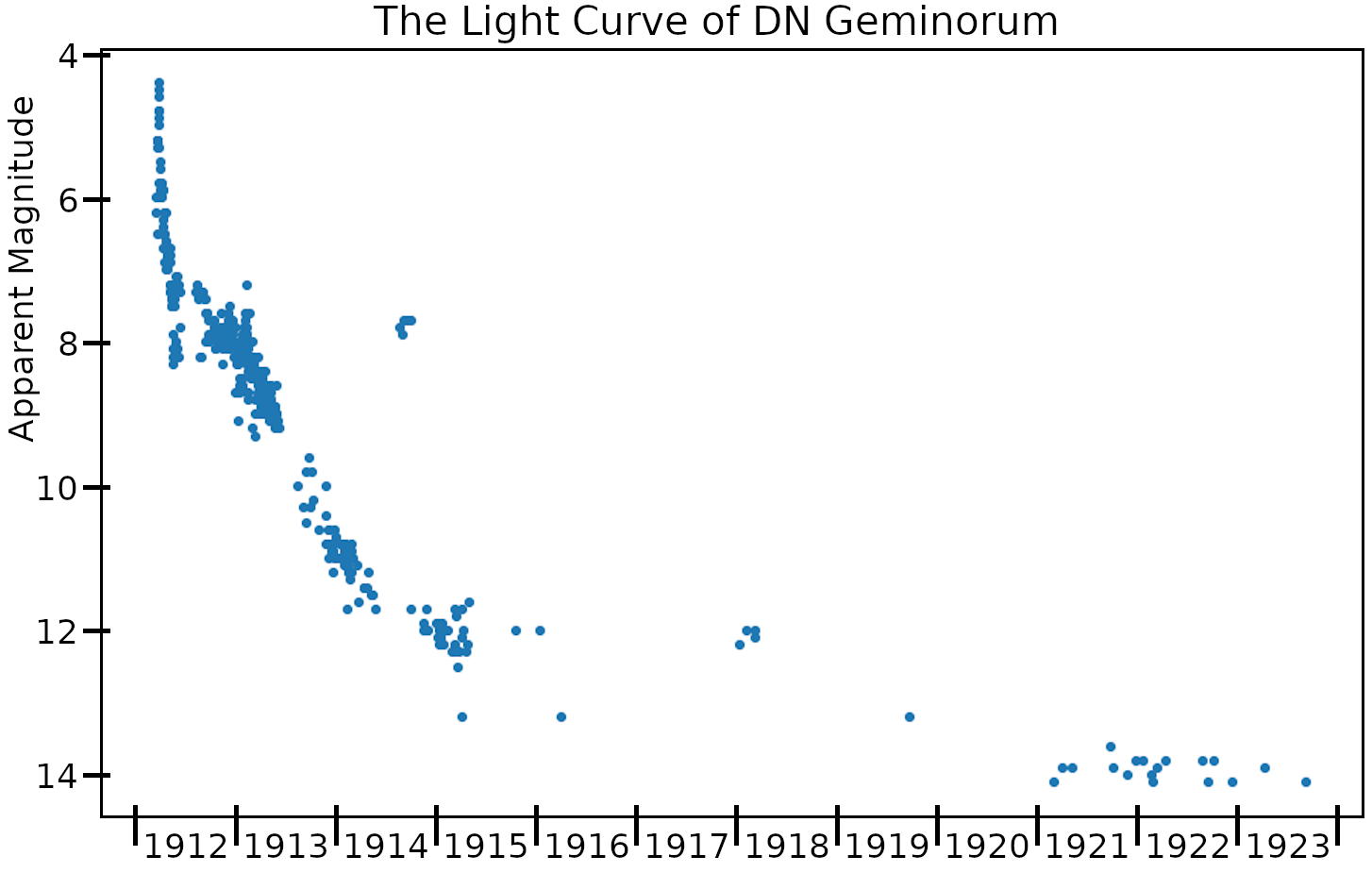
The light curve of DN Geminorum, plotted from AAVSO data

DN Geminorum or Nova Geminorum 1912 was a classical nova which lit up in 1912 in the constellation Gemini. It was discovered by Norwegian variable star observer Sigurd Einbu on March 12, 1912 before reaching peak brightness, which allowed early-stage spectra to be collected by Yerkes Observatory. The nova reached a maximum brightness of around 3.5 mag before declining, which means it was visible to the naked eye. Its brightness decreased over the following 36 days by 3 magnitudes as it gradually faded from sight. The light curve saw two maxima a few months after the outburst, along with strong oscillations. Today its brightness is visual magnitude 15.5.

This is a close binary star system consisting of a white dwarf with 93% of the Sun's mass – the source for the nova explosion – and a lower mass red dwarf companion from which the white dwarf is accreting matter. The system is located approximately 4,500 light years from the Sun based on parallax, with its visual magnitude being diminished by an extinction of 0.53±0.12 due to interstellar dust. Observations of this system showed a sinusoidal variation in luminosity with a period of 3.06840 ± 0.00012 h, which is likely the orbital period for the pair. This oscillation may be caused by irradiation of the companion star by the white dwarf.
