= Lesja murder case =

1987 child murder in Norway

The Lesja Murder Case (Norwegian: Lesja-saken) refers to the disappearance, rape, and murder of 13-year-old Ingrid Marie Skotte from Lesja Municipality in Norway in February 1987. The disappearance became one of the most publicized criminal cases in post-war Norway.

== Disappearance ==
Ingrid Marie Skotte disappeared while hitchhiking towards the village of Lesja on Tuesday afternoon, 10 February 1987. She was going to meet her boyfriend at a café, but never arrived. Witnesses had seen her hitchhiking along the European route E136, and the police became certain that she had been the victim of a violent crime. KRIPOS were soon involved and area searches were carried out without any result. The police directed their attention to a Ford motor vehicle.

On 4 March, the police released composite sketches of two men, but still made no real progress with the case. On 21 March, the body of Ingrid Skotte was found on a slope along Dyrkornstranda in the neighboring Stordal Municipality in Sunnmøre. The autopsy showed that she had first been raped and then strangled. Investigators carried out door-to-door enquiries around the area and received information concerning a 37-year-old man named Per Otto Stenvåg, a divorced father of four. He was known to have a troubled and violent past and drove an old Ford Granada. Stenvåg was arrested on 29 April 1987 and immediately confessed to the murder. During his trial, a 30-year-old woman came forward and said that Stenvåg had violently abused and raped her on 11 April 1987. During the attack, Stenvåg had told her that he was responsible for the Lesja murder. The woman said that she had been too terrified to go to the police, only coming forward when Stenvåg admitted in court to having assaulted an unidentified woman.

== Sentencing and aftermath ==
Stenvåg pleaded guilty and on 17 October 1987 was sentenced to 21 years in prison in addition to 10 years confinement for premeditated murder, rape, abduction, and the use of violent force. In February 1988, the sentence was confirmed by the Supreme Court of Norway rejecting Stenvåg's appeal.

Stenvåg hanged himself in his cell in Gjøvik Prison on the morning of 17 March 1988 by using bed sheets. Two suicide notes left behind by Stenvåg suggested that his decision to take his own life had been deliberate.

== Sources ==
- Hvem Hva Hvor 1988 and 1989
- Nordisk Kriminalkrønike 1990
