= Lesja Municipality =

Municipality in Innlandet, Norway

Lesja Municipality Lesja kommune
- Municipality
- Lesje herred (historic name)
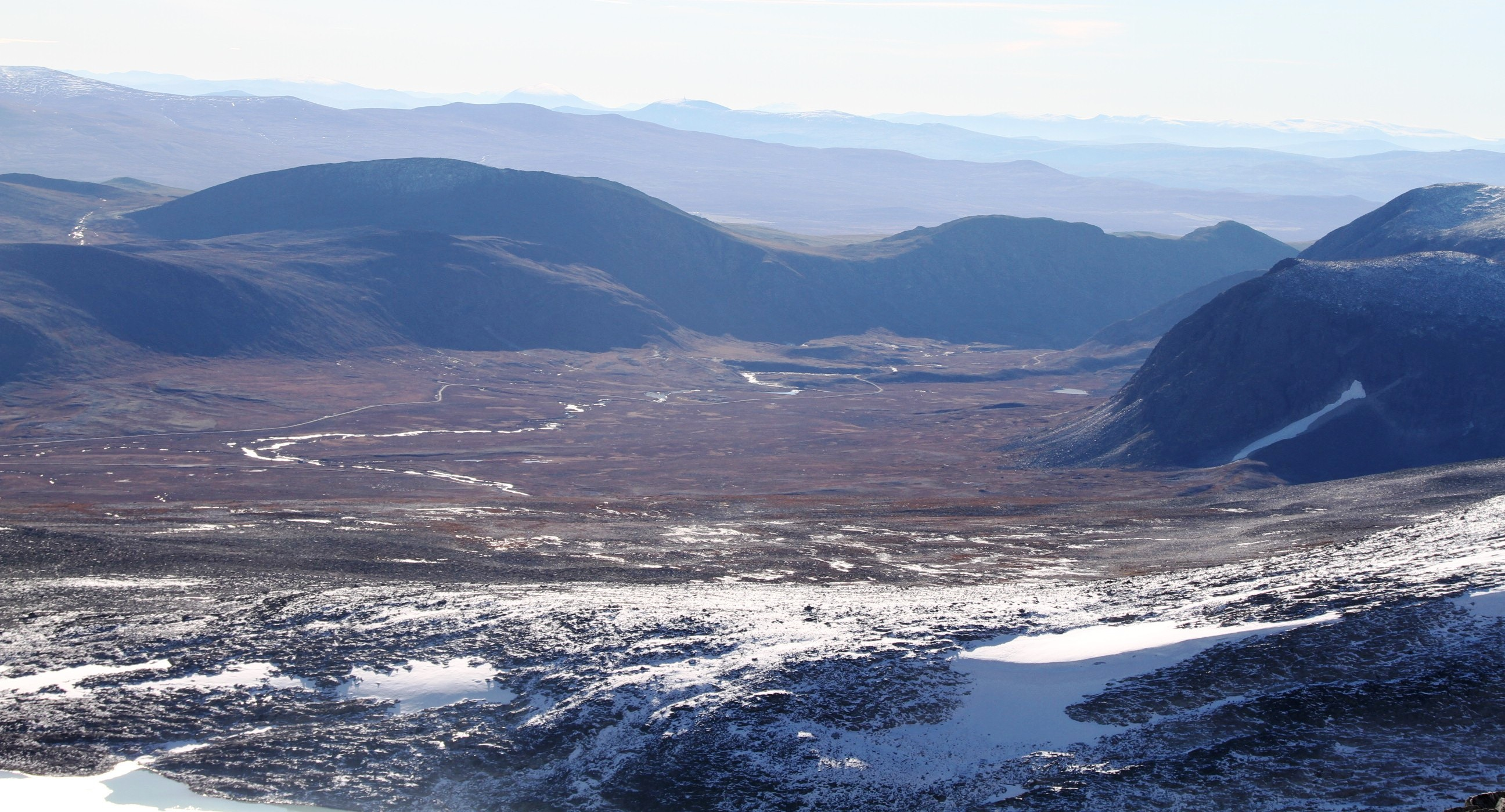
- View of the Lesja area

- Flag Coat of arms

- Innlandet within Norway

- Lesja within Innlandet
- Coordinates: 62°12′38″N 8°38′41″E
- Country: Norway
- County: Innlandet
- District: Gudbrandsdal
- Established: 1 Jan 1838
  - Created as: Formannskapsdistrikt
- Administrative centre: Lesja

Government
  - Mayor (2015): Mariann Skotte (Sp)

Area
  - Total: 2,259.49 km^{2} (872.39 sq mi)
  - Land: 2,166.52 km^{2} (836.50 sq mi)
  - Water: 92.97 km^{2} (35.90 sq mi) 4.1%
  - Rank: #25 in Norway
- Highest elevation: 2,205.6 m (7,236 ft)

Population (2025)
  - Total: 2,006
  - Rank: #281 in Norway
  - Density: 0.9/km^{2} (2.3/sq mi)
  - Change (10 years): ▼ −4.5%
- Demonym: Lesjing

Official language
  - Norwegian form: Neutral
- Time zone: UTC+01:00 (CET)
  - Summer (DST): UTC+02:00 (CEST)
- ISO 3166 code: NO-3432
- Website: Official website

Lesja is a municipality in Innlandet county, Norway. It is located in the traditional district of Gudbrandsdal. The administrative centre of the municipality is the village of Lesja. Other villages in the municipality include Bjorli, Lesjaskog, Lesjaverk, and Lora.

The 2,259.49-square-kilometre (872.39 sq mi) municipality is the 25th largest by area out of the 357 municipalities in Norway. Lesja Municipality is the 281st most populous municipality in Norway with a population of 2,006. The municipality's population density is 0.9 inhabitants per square kilometre (2.3/sq mi) and its population has decreased by 4.5% over the previous 10-year period.

== General information ==
The parish of Lesje (later spelled Lesja) was established as a municipality on 1 January 1838 (see formannskapsdistrikt law). In 1863, the eastern part of the municipality (population: 2,537) was separated to become the new Dovre Municipality. This left Lesja Municipality with 3,666 residents.

Historically, the municipality was part of the old Oppland county. On 1 January 2020, the municipality became a part of the newly-formed Innlandet county (after Hedmark and Oppland counties were merged).

=== Name ===
The municipality (originally the parish) is named after the old Lesja farm (Old Norse: Lesjar) since the first Lesja Church was built there. There are two different interpretations of the meaning of the name. It might derive from læs meaning "pasture", or it is a shortened version of Leirsjøar meaning "muddy lakes", referring to two relatively large and shallow lakes which occupied the valley bottom until the late 19th century, when both lakes were drained in order to gain more farmland. Historically, the name of the municipality was spelled Lesje. On 3 November 1917, a royal resolution changed the spelling of the name of the municipality to Lesja.

=== Coat of arms ===
The coat of arms was granted on 23 January 1987. The official blazon is "Per fess argent and azure, a pile issuant from the base" (Norwegian: På sølv grunn blå skjoldfot med spiss oppover). This means the arms have are divided with a line that is horizontal with a triangle point upwards in the middle. The field (background) below the line has a tincture of blue. Above the line, the field has a tincture of argent which means it is commonly colored white, but if it is made out of metal, then silver is used. The design is meant to represent the spire of Lesja Church, which sits on a hill and its roof line and spire are visible from far away. The arms were designed by Einar H. Skjervold. The municipal flag has the same design as the coat of arms.

=== Churches ===
The Church of Norway has one parish (sokn) within Lesja Municipality. It is part of the Nord-Gudbrandsdal prosti (deanery) in the Diocese of Hamar.

Churches in Lesja Municipality
Parish (sokn)	Church name	Location of the church	Year built
Lesja og Lesjaskog	Lesja Church	Lesja	1749
Lesja og Lesjaskog	Lesjaskog Church	Lesjaskog	1697
Lesja og Lesjaskog	Lesjaverk Church	Lesjaverk	1964

== Geography ==
Lesja Municipality is located in the northwestern edge of Innlandet county. It is bordered in the north by Molde Municipality and Sunndal Municipality (in Møre og Romsdal county) and Oppdal Municipality (in Trøndelag county). It is bordered to the east by Dovre Municipality; in the south by Vågå Municipality and Lom Municipality; in the southwest by Skjåk Municipality; and to the west by Rauma Municipality.

Lesja is highly mountainous, and lies on the east–west watershed, with the lake Lesjaskogsvatnet draining both west to the Rauma river and east to the Gudbrandsdalslågen river. The largest part (82%) of the municipal area is over 900 metres (3,000 ft) above sea level, with many mountain peaks reaching above an elevation of 2,000 metres (6,600 ft) in the northeast. The highest point in the municipality is the 2,205.6-metre (7,236 ft) tall mountain Storstyggesvånåtinden.

The most populated areas lie between 500 and 650 metres (1,640 and 2,130 ft) along the Gudbrandsdalslågen river and highway E136. Abundant summer farms (seter or sæter) are situated close to the treeline, both in the main valley and its tributaries. The summer farms were of major importance for farming until recently, but today only few are used in the traditional way, and mainly as grounds for grazing dairy cattle and sheep. More than 400 lakes are situated within the municipality, mainly above treeline, including the lake Aursjøen. The Norwegian trout is common both in lakes and rivers, even in lakes above 1,500 metres (4,900 ft) above sea level. The landscape is hummocky in general, and owes its appearance mainly to erosion by the Scandinavian Ice Sheet during the last glacial period.

=== Dovrefjell-Sunndalsfjella National Park ===
Dovrefjell-Sunndalsfjella National Park was founded in 2002 and encompasses part of the former Dovre National Park area, as founded in 1974. It is 1,693 square kilometres (654 sq mi) encompassing areas in Lesja Municipality and Dovre Municipality in Innlandet as well as areas in Trøndelag and Møre og Romsdal. It includes the Dovrefjell mountain range.

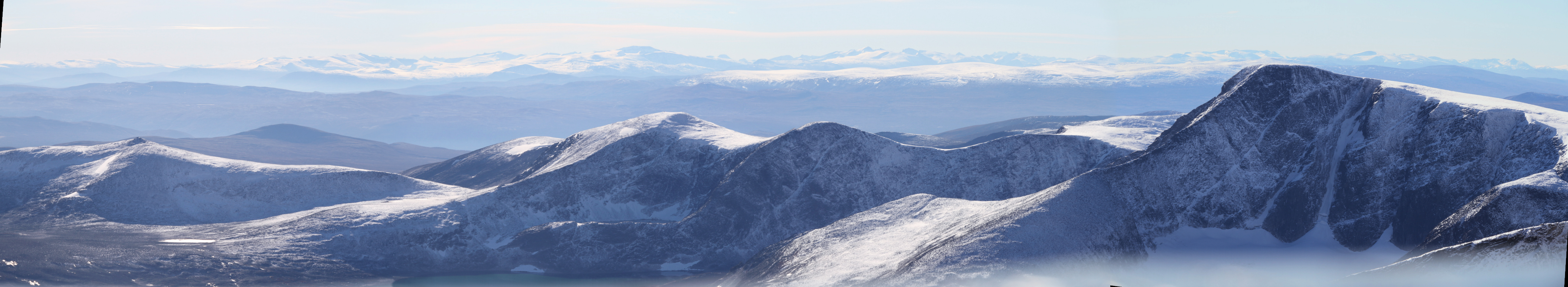
Mountain in Lesja municipality, Dovrefjell mountain massif, in Central Norway.

== Economy ==
The municipal economy is primarily based on agricultural. Recent censuses show over 40% of the residents in the community are in farming.

Rail service is provided by the Rauma Line, connecting with the Dovre Line at Dombås in Dovre and extending to the terminus in Åndalsnes on a fjord in Møre og Romsdal County.

Lesja Municipality is located in a mountain region, comprising the south-westerly portion of the Dovrefjell range. It is the site of the Dovrefjell-Sunndalsfjella National Park, lies just north of Jotunheimen National Park and lies just west of Rondane National Park, so tourism and outdoor sports such as skiing are also important. The Bjorli ski area lies in Lesja Municipality.

== Government ==
Lesja Municipality is responsible for primary education (through 10th grade), outpatient health services, senior citizen services, welfare and other social services, zoning, economic development, and municipal roads and utilities. The municipality is governed by a municipal council of directly elected representatives. The mayor is indirectly elected by a vote of the municipal council. The municipality is under the jurisdiction of the Gudbrandsdal District Court and the Eidsivating Court of Appeal.

=== Municipal council ===
The municipal council (Kommunestyre) of Lesja Municipality is made up of 17 representatives that are elected to four year terms. The tables below show the current and historical composition of the council by political party.

Lesja kommunestyre 2023–2027
Party name (in Norwegian)	Number of representatives
Labour Party (Arbeiderpartiet)	8
Conservative Party (Høyre)	2
Centre Party (Senterpartiet)	7
Total number of members:	17

Lesja kommunestyre 2019–2023
Party name (in Norwegian)	Number of representatives
Labour Party (Arbeiderpartiet)	7
Conservative Party (Høyre)	2
Centre Party (Senterpartiet)	8
Total number of members:	17

Lesja kommunestyre 2015–2019
Party name (in Norwegian)	Number of representatives
Labour Party (Arbeiderpartiet)	7
Conservative Party (Høyre)	3
Centre Party (Senterpartiet)	7
Total number of members:	17

Lesja kommunestyre 2011–2015
Party name (in Norwegian)	Number of representatives
Labour Party (Arbeiderpartiet)	9
Conservative Party (Høyre)	3
Centre Party (Senterpartiet)	8
Liberal Party (Venstre)	1
Total number of members:	21

Lesja kommunestyre 2007–2011
Party name (in Norwegian)	Number of representatives
Labour Party (Arbeiderpartiet)	6
Conservative Party (Høyre)	2
Centre Party (Senterpartiet)	11
Liberal Party (Venstre)	1
Local list (Bygdalista)	1
Total number of members:	21

Lesja kommunestyre 2003–2007
Party name (in Norwegian)	Number of representatives
Labour Party (Arbeiderpartiet)	5
Conservative Party (Høyre)	1
Christian Democratic Party (Kristelig Folkeparti)	1
Centre Party (Senterpartiet)	12
Liberal Party (Venstre)	1
Local list (Bygdalista)	1
Total number of members:	21

Lesja kommunestyre 1999–2003
Party name (in Norwegian)	Number of representatives
Labour Party (Arbeiderpartiet)	7
Conservative Party (Høyre)	1
Christian Democratic Party (Kristelig Folkeparti)	2
Centre Party (Senterpartiet)	8
Liberal Party (Venstre)	1
Local list (Bygdelista)	2
Total number of members:	21

Lesja kommunestyre 1995–1999
Party name (in Norwegian)	Number of representatives
Labour Party (Arbeiderpartiet)	6
Conservative Party (Høyre)	2
Christian Democratic Party (Kristelig Folkeparti)	1
Centre Party (Senterpartiet)	8
Liberal Party (Venstre)	1
Local list (Bygdalista)	3
Total number of members:	21

Lesja kommunestyre 1991–1995
Party name (in Norwegian)	Number of representatives
Labour Party (Arbeiderpartiet)	6
Conservative Party (Høyre)	2
Christian Democratic Party (Kristelig Folkeparti)	1
Centre Party (Senterpartiet)	7
Local list (Bygdalista)	5
Total number of members:	21

Lesja kommunestyre 1987–1991
Party name (in Norwegian)	Number of representatives
Labour Party (Arbeiderpartiet)	8
Conservative Party (Høyre)	3
Christian Democratic Party (Kristelig Folkeparti)	1
Centre Party (Senterpartiet)	8
Liberal Party (Venstre)	1
Total number of members:	21

Lesja kommunestyre 1983–1987
Party name (in Norwegian)	Number of representatives
Labour Party (Arbeiderpartiet)	9
Conservative Party (Høyre)	3
Christian Democratic Party (Kristelig Folkeparti)	1
Centre Party (Senterpartiet)	7
Liberal Party (Venstre)	1
Total number of members:	21

Lesja kommunestyre 1979–1983
Party name (in Norwegian)	Number of representatives
Labour Party (Arbeiderpartiet)	8
Conservative Party (Høyre)	3
Christian Democratic Party (Kristelig Folkeparti)	2
Centre Party (Senterpartiet)	8
Total number of members:	21

Lesja kommunestyre 1975–1979
Party name (in Norwegian)	Number of representatives
Labour Party (Arbeiderpartiet)	7
Christian Democratic Party (Kristelig Folkeparti)	2
Centre Party (Senterpartiet)	10
Non-party and free voters list (Upolitiske og Frie velgere)	2
Total number of members:	21

Lesja kommunestyre 1971–1975
Party name (in Norwegian)	Number of representatives
Labour Party (Arbeiderpartiet)	7
Christian Democratic Party (Kristelig Folkeparti)	1
Centre Party (Senterpartiet)	10
Local List(s) (Lokale lister)	3
Total number of members:	21

Lesja kommunestyre 1967–1971
Party name (in Norwegian)	Number of representatives
Labour Party (Arbeiderpartiet)	7
Joint List(s) of Non-Socialist Parties (Borgerlige Felleslister)	9
Local List(s) (Lokale lister)	5
Total number of members:	21

Lesja kommunestyre 1963–1967
Party name (in Norwegian)	Number of representatives
Labour Party (Arbeiderpartiet)	9
Conservative Party (Høyre)	1
Christian Democratic Party (Kristelig Folkeparti)	1
Centre Party (Senterpartiet)	10
Total number of members:	21

Lesja herredsstyre 1959–1963
Party name (in Norwegian)	Number of representatives
Labour Party (Arbeiderpartiet)	8
Conservative Party (Høyre)	2
Christian Democratic Party (Kristelig Folkeparti)	1
Centre Party (Senterpartiet)	10
Total number of members:	21

Lesja herredsstyre 1955–1959
Party name (in Norwegian)	Number of representatives
Labour Party (Arbeiderpartiet)	8
Conservative Party (Høyre)	1
Christian Democratic Party (Kristelig Folkeparti)	2
Farmers' Party (Bondepartiet)	10
Total number of members:	21

Lesja herredsstyre 1951–1955
Party name (in Norwegian)	Number of representatives
Labour Party (Arbeiderpartiet)	10
Farmers' Party (Bondepartiet)	14
Total number of members:	24

Lesja herredsstyre 1947–1951
Party name (in Norwegian)	Number of representatives
Labour Party (Arbeiderpartiet)	9
Farmers' Party (Bondepartiet)	9
Joint List(s) of Non-Socialist Parties (Borgerlige Felleslister)	6
Total number of members:	24

Lesja herredsstyre 1945–1947
Party name (in Norwegian)	Number of representatives
Labour Party (Arbeiderpartiet)	10
Farmers' Party (Bondepartiet)	7
Joint list of the Liberal Party (Venstre) and the Radical People's Party (Radikale Folkepartiet)	2
Joint List(s) of Non-Socialist Parties (Borgerlige Felleslister)	5
Total number of members:	24

Lesja herredsstyre 1937–1940*
Party name (in Norwegian)	Number of representatives
Labour Party (Arbeiderpartiet)	8
Farmers' Party (Bondepartiet)	10
Joint List(s) of Non-Socialist Parties (Borgerlige Felleslister)	6
Total number of members:	24
Note: Due to the German occupation of Norway during World War II, no elections were held for new municipal councils until after the war ended in 1945.

=== Mayors ===
The mayor (Norwegian: ordfører) of Lesja Municipality is the political leader of the municipality and the chairperson of the municipal council. Here is a list of people who have held this position:

- 1838–1849: Johannes Tøndevold
- 1850–1853: Peder Skotte
- 1854–1855: Syver Hogsvold
- 1856–1863: H.G. Kolstad
- 1864–1867: Syver Hogsvold
- 1868–1871: Peder Bj. Holager
- 1872–1873: Syver Hogsvold
- 1874–1877: H.H. Hatrem
- 1878–1879: Peder Bj. Holager
- 1880–1883: Per Kolstad
- 1884–1885: H.H. Hatrem
- 1886–1887: Peder Bj. Holager
- 1888–1889: H.H. Hatrem
- 1890–1891: Peder Bj. Holager
- 1892–1901: A. Norderhus
- 1902–1913: Ole Rolstad (Bp)
- 1914–1916: Ole Ekre (Bp)
- 1917–1919: Ole Rolstad (Bp)
- 1920–1922: Ole Ekre (Bp)
- 1923–1925: Ole Rolstad (Bp)
- 1926–1928: Ole Ekre (Bp)
- 1929–1937: Sigvart Jordhøy (Bp)
- 1938–1947: John Bottheim (Bp)
- 1947–1955: Ola O. Mølmen (Bp)
- 1956–1959: Sverre J. Botheim (Sp)
- 1960–1963: Ola O. Mølmen (Sp)
- 1964–1967: Sverre J. Botheim (Sp)
- 1968–1969: Ola O. Mølmen (Sp)
- 1970–1971: Andreas Mølmen (Heile Lesja)
- 1972–1975: Karl Stålaker (Sp)
- 1976–1987: Jo Nordahl Botheim (Sp)
- 1988–1991: Osvald Haugbotn (Sp)
- 1992–1999: Jo N. Bottheim (Sp)
- 1999–2011: Per Dag Hole (Sp)
- 2011–2015: Steinar Tronhus (Ap)
- 2015–present: Mariann Skotte (Sp)

== History ==
Number of minorities (1st and 2nd generation) in Lesja by country of origin in 2017
Ancestry	Number
Poland	41
Lithuania	34
Somalia	16

Since it is located on a pass providing access to the Gudbrandsdalen, Lesja lies on an important trade route used in prehistoric times.

=== Earliest recorded history ===
The area is first mentioned in the written chronicle of the Heimskringla (The Chronicle of the Kings of Norway) by Snorri Sturluson. The account of King Olaf's (A.D. 1015–1021) conversion of Dale-Gudbrand to Christianity is popularly recognized. King Olaf's success was short-lived, for in 1029 the Norwegian nobles, seething with discontent, rallied round the invading Knut the Great, and Olaf had to flee. To avoid engaging a fleet of 25 ships, 400 of King Olav's men and 100 loyal peasant farmers from Romsdal built a road up from the Romsdalfjord which passed through the area that became known as Lesjaverk. His men fled along this road and across Gudbrandsdal. There he was not warmly received since he had killed King Thorer of Gudbrandsdal, so he went on to Hedmark. From there he proceeded to Sweden and on to Russia. On his return a year later he fell at the Battle of Stiklestad.

=== Lesjaverk (The Lesja iron works) ===
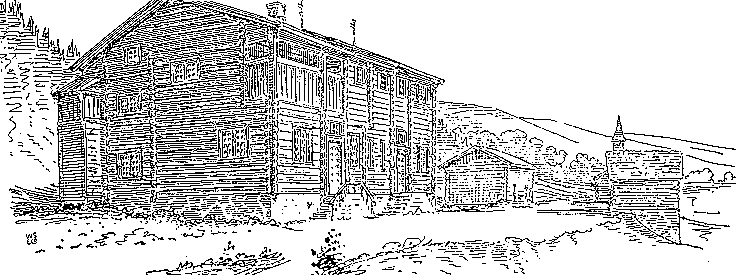
The Lesja Ironwork, Norway, main building as it would have looked around 1752. The illustration by Professor Johan Meyer dates from 1910.

Iron smelting is recorded in Lesja municipality at Lesjaverk (lit. 'Lesja Iron Works') as early as 1614, when King Christian IV of Denmark and Norway authorized the Romsdal Market at Devold on the Rauma river 4 miles upstream of Åndalsnes. With this change, Molde assumed the role as principal market town for Romsdal formerly held by Veøy. This change was made to provide the ironworkers at Lesjaverk with a convenient outlet for their products as well as providing them a market to purchases goods and food supplies such as stockfish and grain.

=== Art and culture ===
Jakob Bersveinson Klukstad (1710 to 1773), who was born in the parish of Lom spent most of his career on Klukstad farm in Lesja. Klukstad was the foremost Norwegian sculptor and painter of his generation. His work can still be seen in churches at Lesja, Skjåk, and Heidal.

=== Emigration from Lesja ===
The Lesja area in the Gudbrandsdal was source of numerous emigrants to America. According to Du Chaillu, "...during the great famine of 1867; a year memorable in the annals of Northern Europe, when, in consequence of an early and heavy frost in summer, the crops were destroyed, and desolation and death spread over vast districts. The lichen and the bark of the birch tree, mixed with a little flour, became the food of the people after the cattle had been eaten up and nothing else was left. The year following a strong tide of emigration set out for America."

=== World War 2 ===
After the German invasion of April 1940, while King Haakon and the Norwegian government were moving from Elverum to the west coast, the King and Crown Prince Olaf arrived in Otta on the night of April 13. The prime minister and his colleagues, who were then in Lesja, were summoned and a communiqué, ending "God save Norway," and urging resistance to the unprovoked attack was issued. They now intended to relocate to the west coast, but the Germans had dropped paratroopers higher in the Gudbrandsdalen, at Dombås, cutting off the rail route. It was not until the evening of the 21st that the King was able to travel by road from Otta to Lesja on the east–west watershed and then down the narrow Romsdal to Åndalsnes.

During the war a British fighter squadron (flying 'Gloster Gladiators') flew from the icebound surface of lake Lesjaskogsvatnet. No. 263 Squadron RAF operated with 18 Gloster Gladiator biplane fighters in late April 1940 as part of the Norwegian campaign.

== Notable people ==
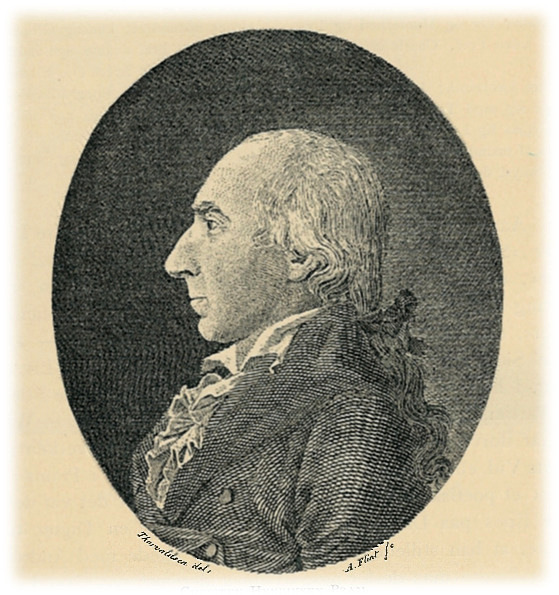
Christen Henriksen Pram, 1886

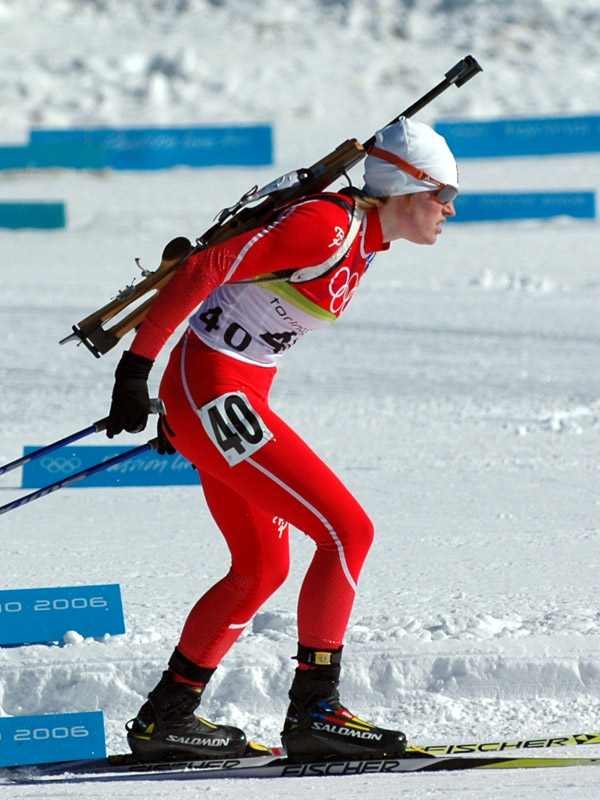
Tora Berger, 2006

- Jakob Klukstad (1705–1773), a wood carver and painter who lived most of his life and died in Lesja
- Edvard Storm (1749–1794), a national romantic poet and teacher in Lesja
- Christen Pram (1756 in Lesja – 1821), an economist, civil servant, poet, novelist, playwright, diarist, and magazine editor
- Jens Holmboe (1752 in Lesja – 1804), a bailiff who helped settle the Målselvdalen
- John Flittie (1856 in Lesja – 1913), the first North Dakota Secretary of State who emigrated from Lesja in 1867
- Frederick Delius (1862–1934), an English composer who summered at Villa Høifagerli, the house he built in Lesjaskog in 1921
- Sigurd Einbu (1866 in Lesjaskog – 1946), a self-taught astronomer
- Ragnvald Einbu (1870 in Lesja – 1943), a painter and woodcarver of fairy-tale and genre figures
- Lars Magnus Moen (1885 in Lesja – 1964), a politician, government minister, and member of the Storting from 1928-1957
- Olaf Heitkøtter, (Norwegian Wiki) (1928–2013), a mountain ranger in Lesja who wrote seven books
- Ola Enstad (1942 in Lesjaskog – 2013), a sculptor
- Arne Hyttnes (born 1950 in Lesjaskog), a banker

== See also ==
- Lesja murder case
