= Norsk Novaselskap =

Norsk Novaselskap (the Norwegian Nova Society) was a Norwegian society organizing amateur astronomers in Norway. It was founded by Sigurd Einbu. Systematic observations and search for new variable stars was organised by the society. One of the most active members was Nobel laureate in chemistry, Odd Hassel, who for more than 50 years observed comets and variable stars.
