= Lora, Norway =

Village in Lesja Municipality, Norway

Lora
- Village
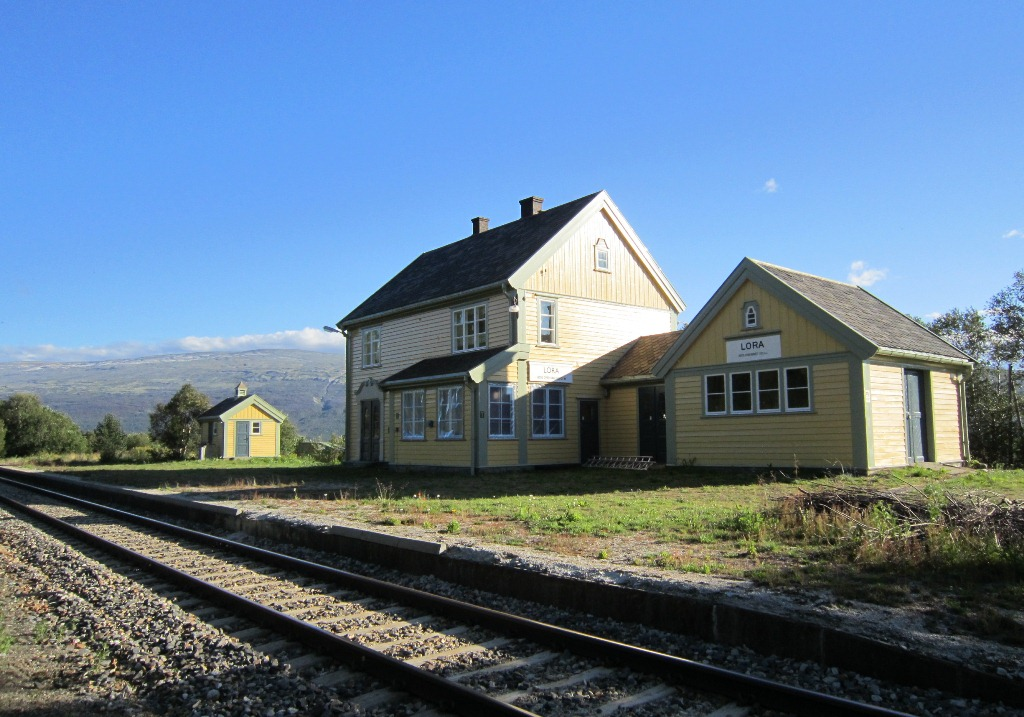
- View of the village railway station
- Interactive map of Lora
- Location within Innlandet Location within Norway
- Coordinates: 62.14241°N 8.69825°E
- Country: Norway
- Region: Eastern Norway
- County: Innlandet
- District: Gudbrandsdalen
- Municipality: Lesja Municipality
- Elevation: 619 m (2,031 ft)
- Time zone: UTC+01:00 (CET)
  - Summer (DST): UTC+02:00 (CEST)
- Post Code: 2666 Lora

Lora is a village in Lesja Municipality in Innlandet county, Norway. The village is located at the confluence of the Lora river and the Gudbrandsdalslågen river. The Lordalen valley lies to the southwest of the village. The village lies midway between the village of Lesja and the village of Lesjaskog. The European route E136 highway and the Raumabanen railway line both run through the village. Lora has one gas station, a farm equipment repair shop, and two grocery stores. The area surrounding the village of Lora primarily consists of dairy and sheep farms.

The Lordalen valley starts at the village of Lora and it heads to the southwest, passing up through the seters, and into the Reinheimen National Park. The valley ends at a broad pass at an elevation of 1,300 metres (4,300 ft) above sea level. Hiking over that high pass will lead into Skjåk Municipality.
