= Lesja Church =

Church in Innlandet, Norway

- Lesja kyrkje
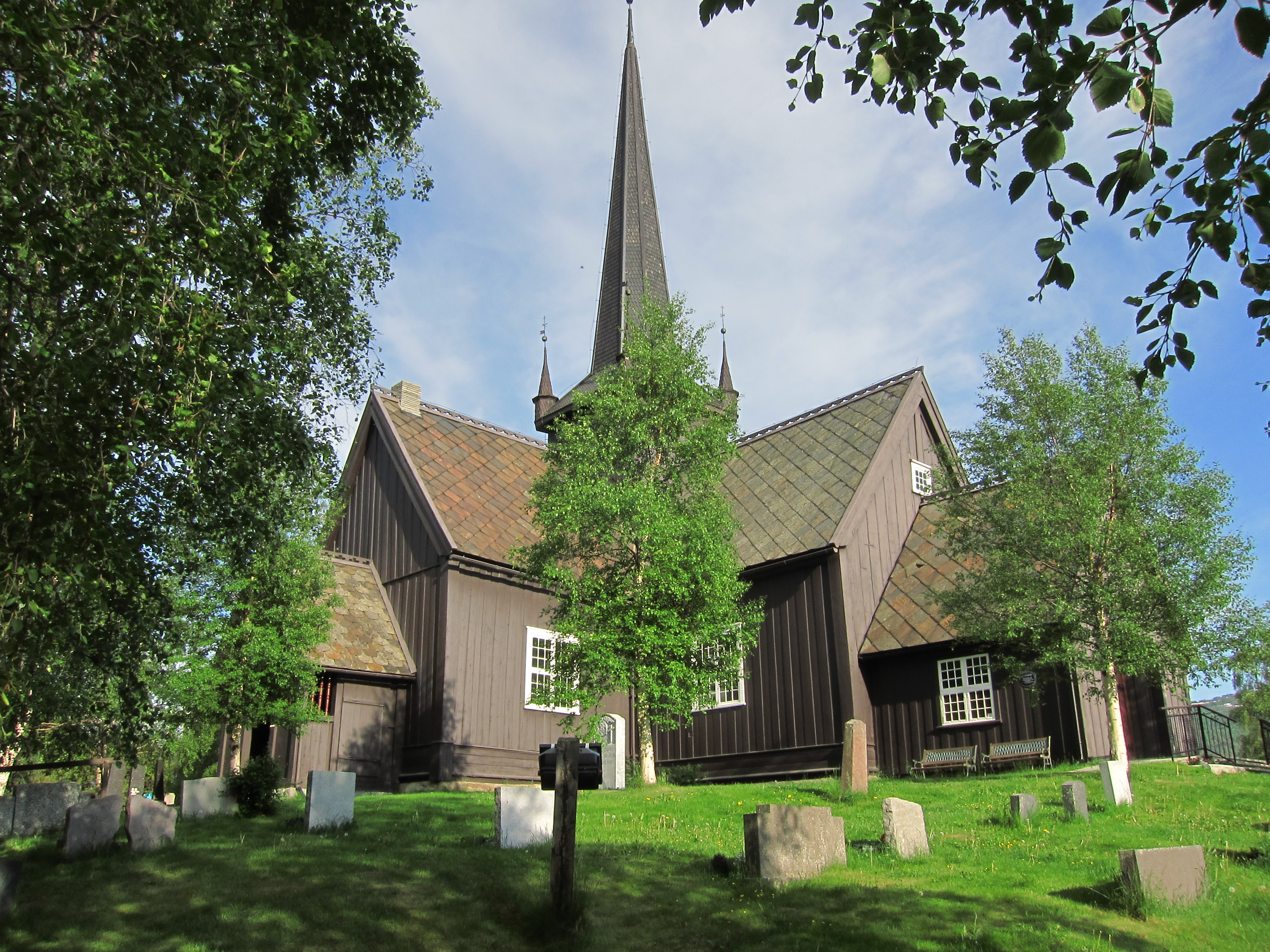
- View of the church
- Lesja Church
- 62°06′43″N 8°51′16″E
- Location: Lesja Municipality, Innlandet
- Country: Norway
- Denomination: Church of Norway
- Previous denomination: Catholic Church
- Churchmanship: Evangelical Lutheran

History
- Status: Parish church
- Founded: 11th century
- Consecrated: 1750

Architecture
- Functional status: Active
- Architect: Ola Fredriksson Hole
- Architectural type: Cruciform
- Completed: 1749 (277 years ago)

Specifications
- Capacity: 300
- Materials: Wood

Administration
- Diocese: Hamar bispedømme
- Deanery: Nord-Gudbrandsdal prosti
- Parish: Lesja og Lesjaskog
- Norwegian Cultural Heritage Site
- Type: Church
- Status: Automatically protected
- ID: 84291

Lesja Church (Norwegian: Lesja kyrkje) is a parish church of the Church of Norway in Lesja Municipality in Innlandet county, Norway. It is located in the village of Lesja. It is the church for the Lesja og Lesjaskog parish which is part of the Nord-Gudbrandsdal prosti (deanery) in the Diocese of Hamar. The brown, wooden church was built in an cruciform design in 1749 using plans drawn up by the architect Ola Fredriksson Hole. The church seats about 300 people.

The church cemetery contains a large number of grave markers from the 1700s, and some of them have been gathered together and set up below an awning in the cemetery. The site, which is a well-known tourist destination, can be reached via County Road 496 and European route E136.

== History ==
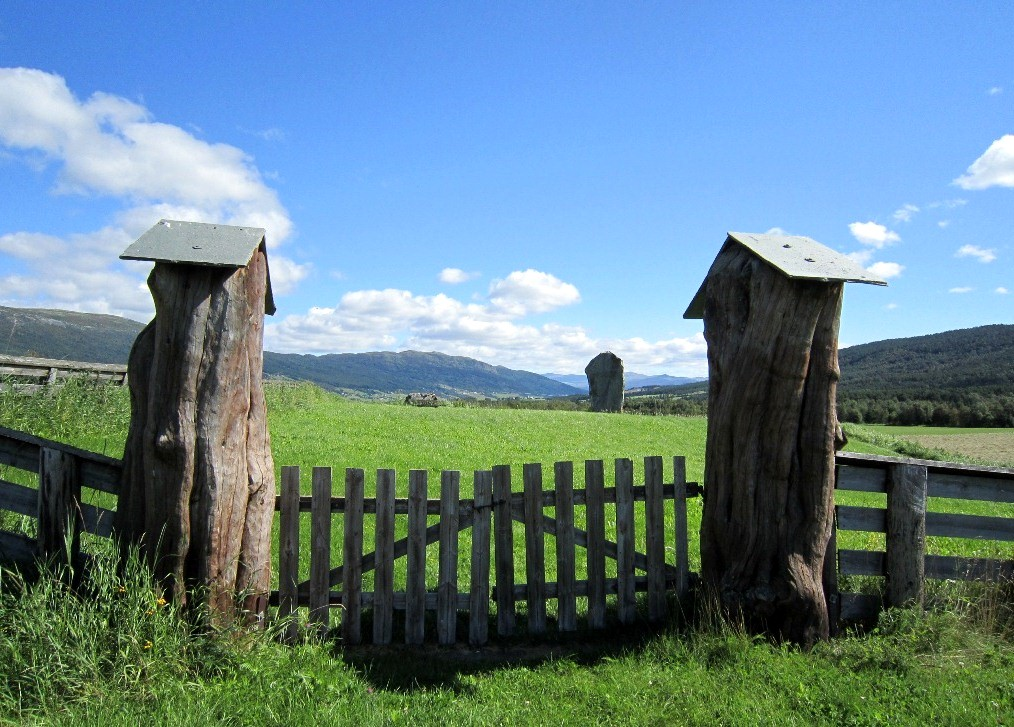
Memorial stone marking the former church site

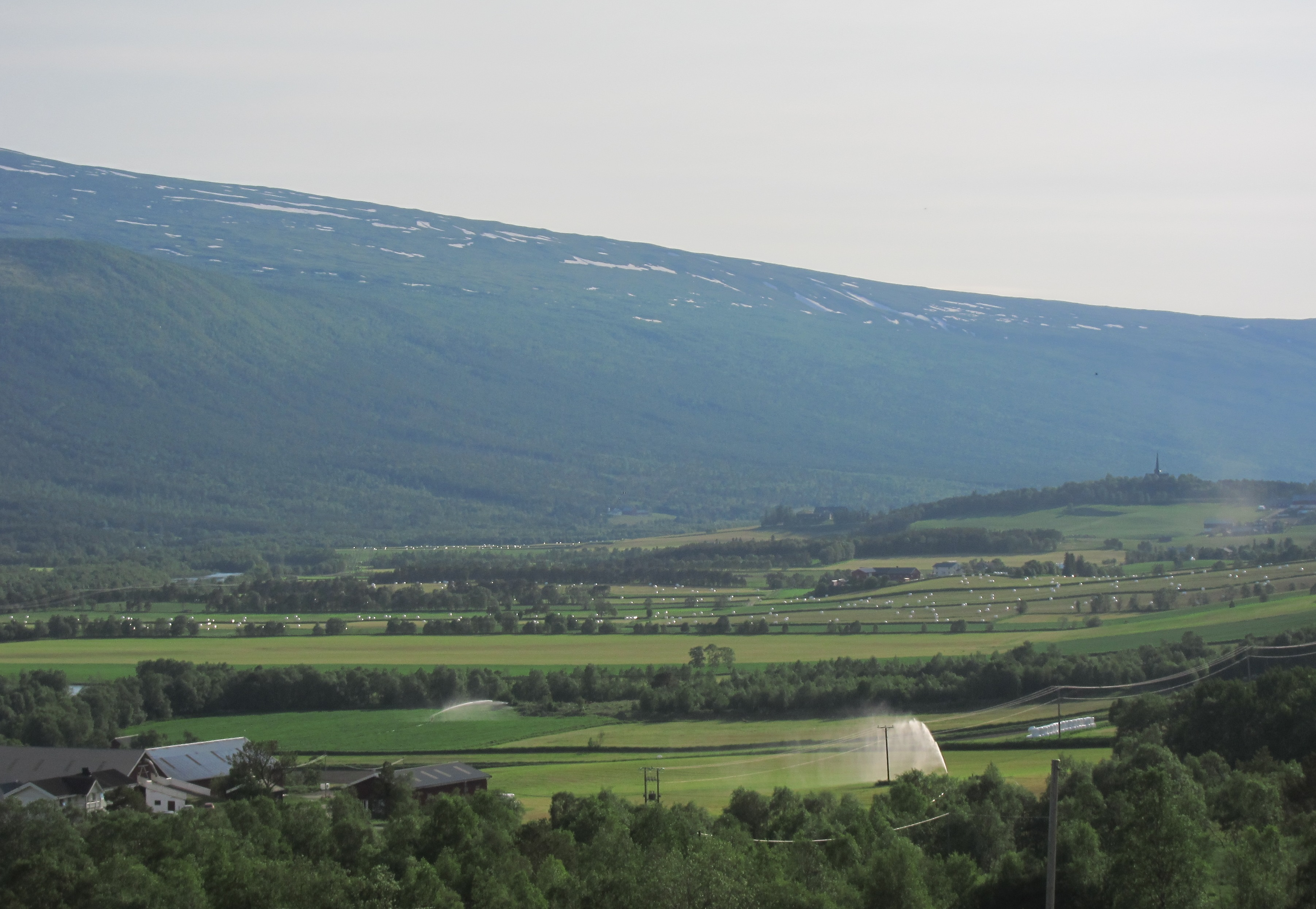
Lesja Church sits on a small hill on the flat valley floor, previously a shallow lake

The first church in Lesja was a wooden stave church that, according to tradition, was built during the 11th century (on the site of a Viking Age pagan shrine). This building was located at Hov (or historically, Hof), about 500 metres (1,600 ft) south of the present church site. The church stood overlooking the former lake Lesja. The river Gudbrandsdalslågen flows past the village, but centuries ago the water level was higher, giving it more the appearance of a long, narrow, shallow lake. In 1653, old stave church was enlarged by adding two transept arms to create a cruciform design. A new tower was also built at the same time.

In most of the parishes in the Gudbrandsdalen valley, new churches were built in the mid-1700s. The king auctioned off the all churches in 1723 at the Norwegian church auction which would help pay his debts from the Great Northern War. All of the churches in the valley were purchased by villagers, and when they built new churches, they chose to build them from logs in a cruciform shape. A new cathedral in Christiania, Our Savior's Church, was built during the 1690s. It is believed to have served as a model for many of these new churches in Gudbrandsdalen.

By the mid-1700s, the old stave church was in poor condition, so (like most other nearby parishes) plans were made to replace the old building with a new church. The poor bearing capacity of the land near the former lake had probably damaged the old stave church as the land was quite water-logged and soft. This concern about the ground, led the parish leaders to move the church site about 500 metres (1,600 ft) to the north on higher ground. The new site was on the north side of the parsonage farm on a hill in the middle of the valley, surrounded by woods. The new building was completed in 1749. The church is built from logs and it was designed with a cruciform floor plan. It was consecrated in 1750. The priest who consecrated the church named it Betel kirke ("Bethel Church"), using a Biblical name Bethel, meaning the "house of God".

The new church had a cruciform design. One arm constitutes the choir, separated from the nave with a chancel screen, usually crowned with the king's monogram supported by two lions. In the case of Lesja Church, it is the monogram of Frederick V. The cross-arms have a gable roof of uniform height. The cross-arms to the north and west have a second floor seating gallery. The tower resembles other towers in the region (including the Ringebu Stave Church and Vågå Church), the style of which was developed by Werner Olsen about 100 years earlier. In order to create a solid structure, the builder allowed the top three logs to extend through the cross-arms. The nave is about 7 meters (23 ft) wide.

The pulpit in Lesja Church is richly carved with acanthus decorations and was created by Jakob Klukstad in 1742-1745 (this was in the old church for a few years and then moved to the new church when it was built). Klukstad was from Lom but he moved to Lesja and was the head of the household at the parsonage farm, probably at the time he was working on the church. The pulpit was made for the previous church that stood at the site. Klukstad also created the altarpiece for the new church, which has a very original design. It is a large and richly executed work of art with a framework of acanthus surrounding several carved figures. The altarpiece is a masterpiece of folk art in the region. The ceiling painting in the church and the painting on the sides of the galleries and box pews were created by Ragnvald Einbu based on a model from preserved remnants from the church's original decor.

In 1814, this church served as an election church (Norwegian: valgkirke). Together with more than 300 other parish churches across Norway, it was a polling station for elections to the 1814 Norwegian Constituent Assembly which wrote the Constitution of Norway. This was Norway's first national elections. Each church parish was a constituency that elected people called "electors" who later met together in each county to elect the representatives for the assembly that was to meet at Eidsvoll Manor later that year.

An extensive restoration in 1901-1903 was carried out by the builder Eirik Sylte from Tresfjord Municipality. This restoration is now referred to as "the great looting" of the old church since most original interior was removed including the crucifix, the original pews, and the small stained glass windows. The exterior of the church was also painted white. All of these changes created great dissatisfaction amongst the parish residents. In the 1920s, another restoration took place under the direction of Heinrich Jürgensen and later completed by the builder Christian Ødegård from Lesja. The church pews were replaced with pews that looked more like the original ones. The church also regained its dark brown exterior color. In the 1990s, the church was again extensively restored. This time the focus was on technology, electricity, and fire prevention. The church porch was also rebuilt.

== Media gallery ==
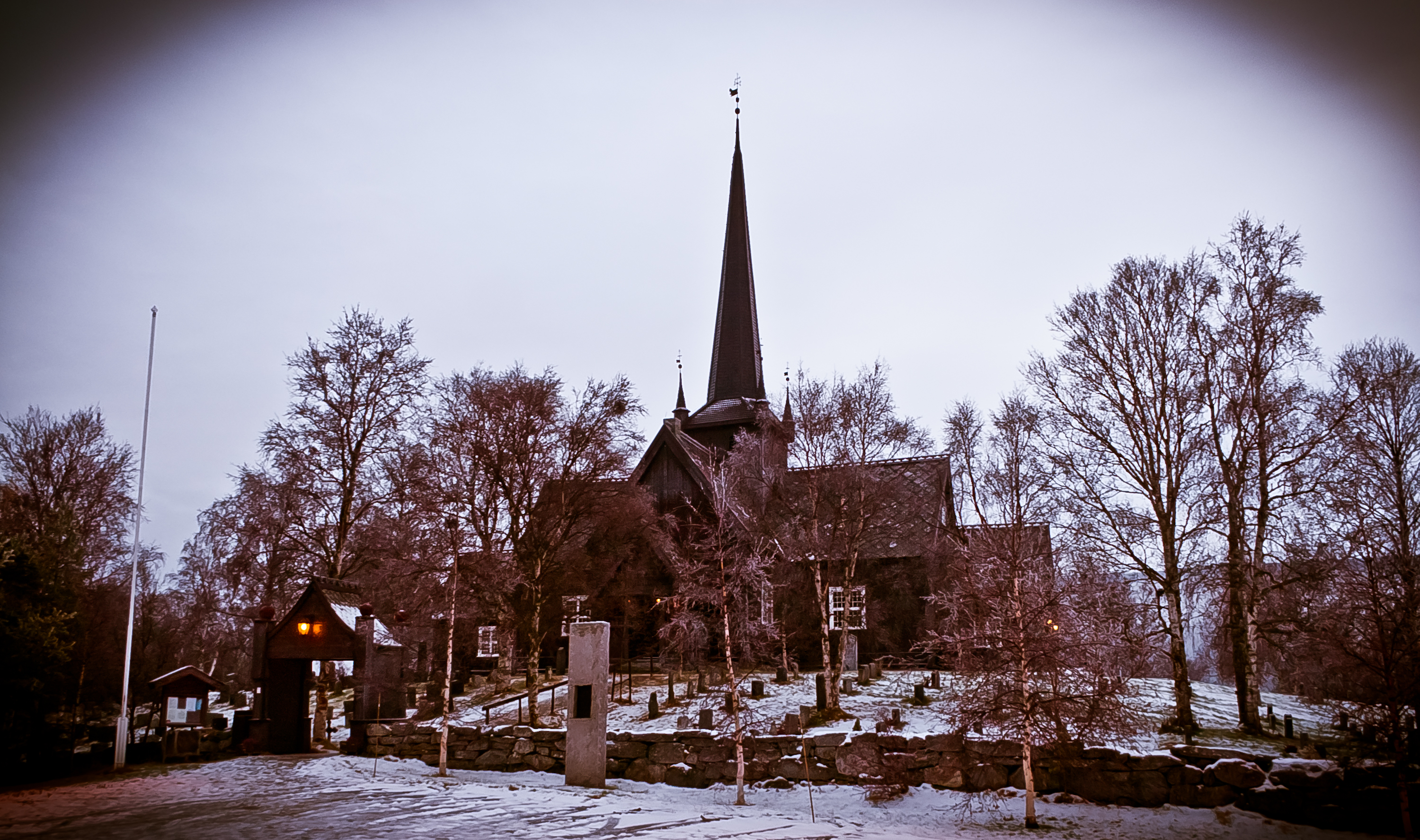

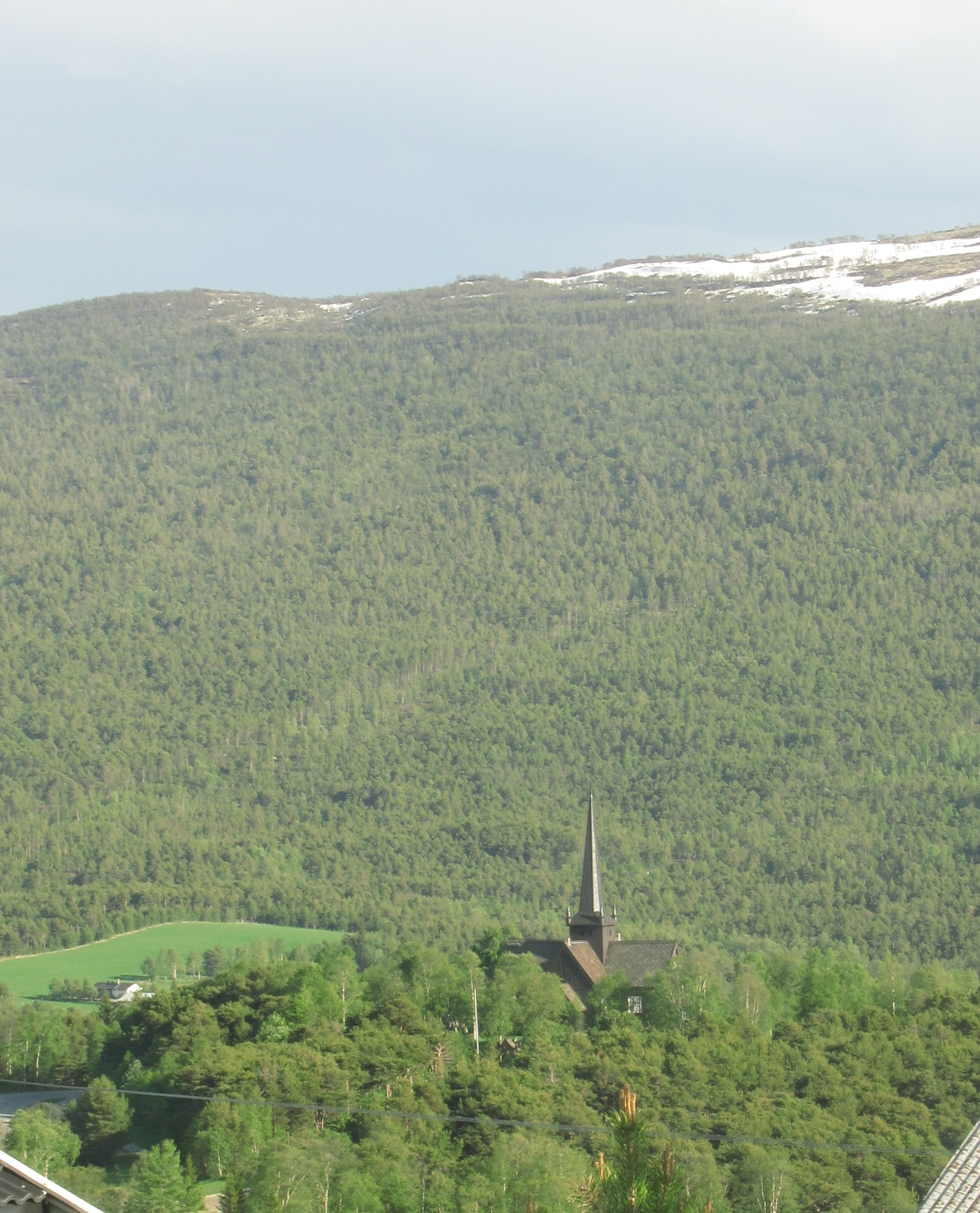

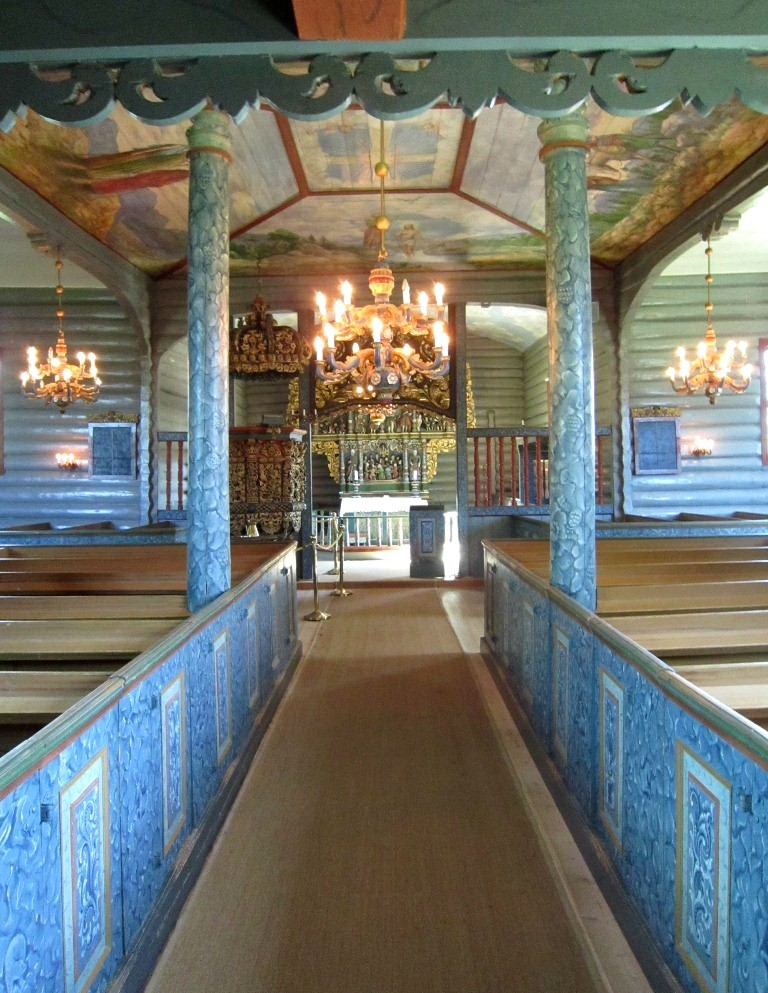

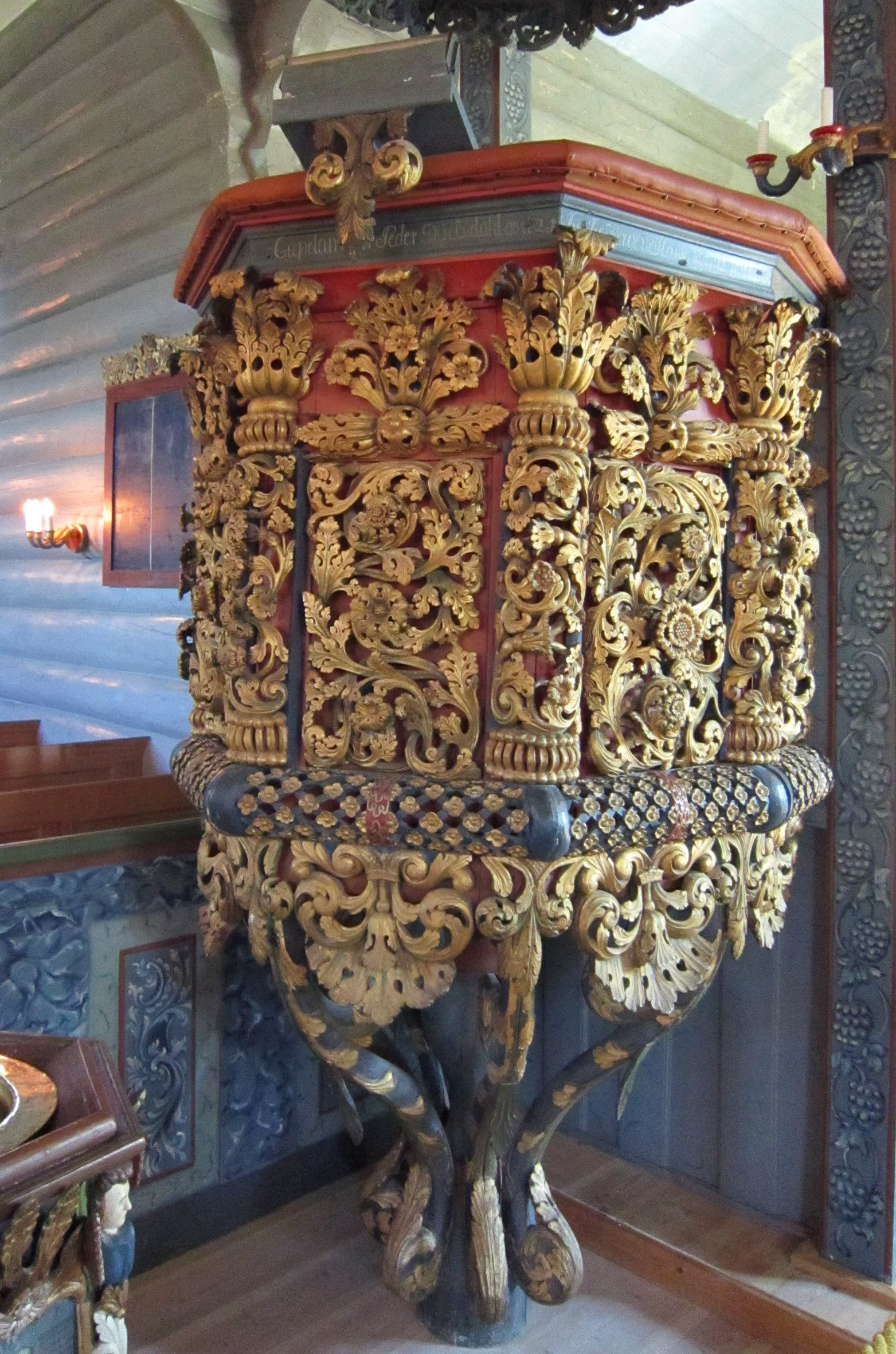

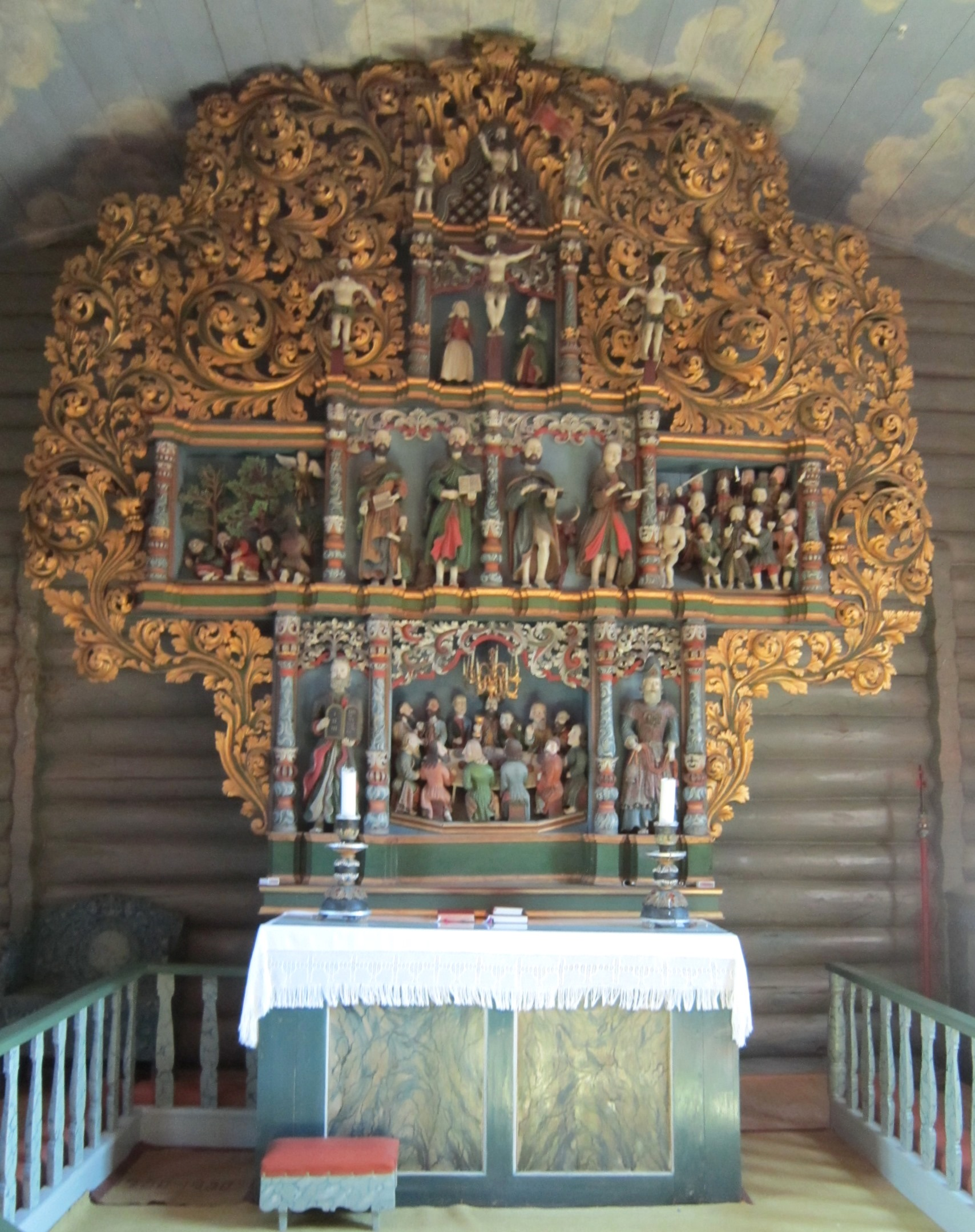

== See also ==
- List of churches in Hamar
