= Vestoppland Prison =

Norwegian prison in Gjøvik, Innlandet, Norway

Coordinates: 60°47′49″N 10°41′12″E

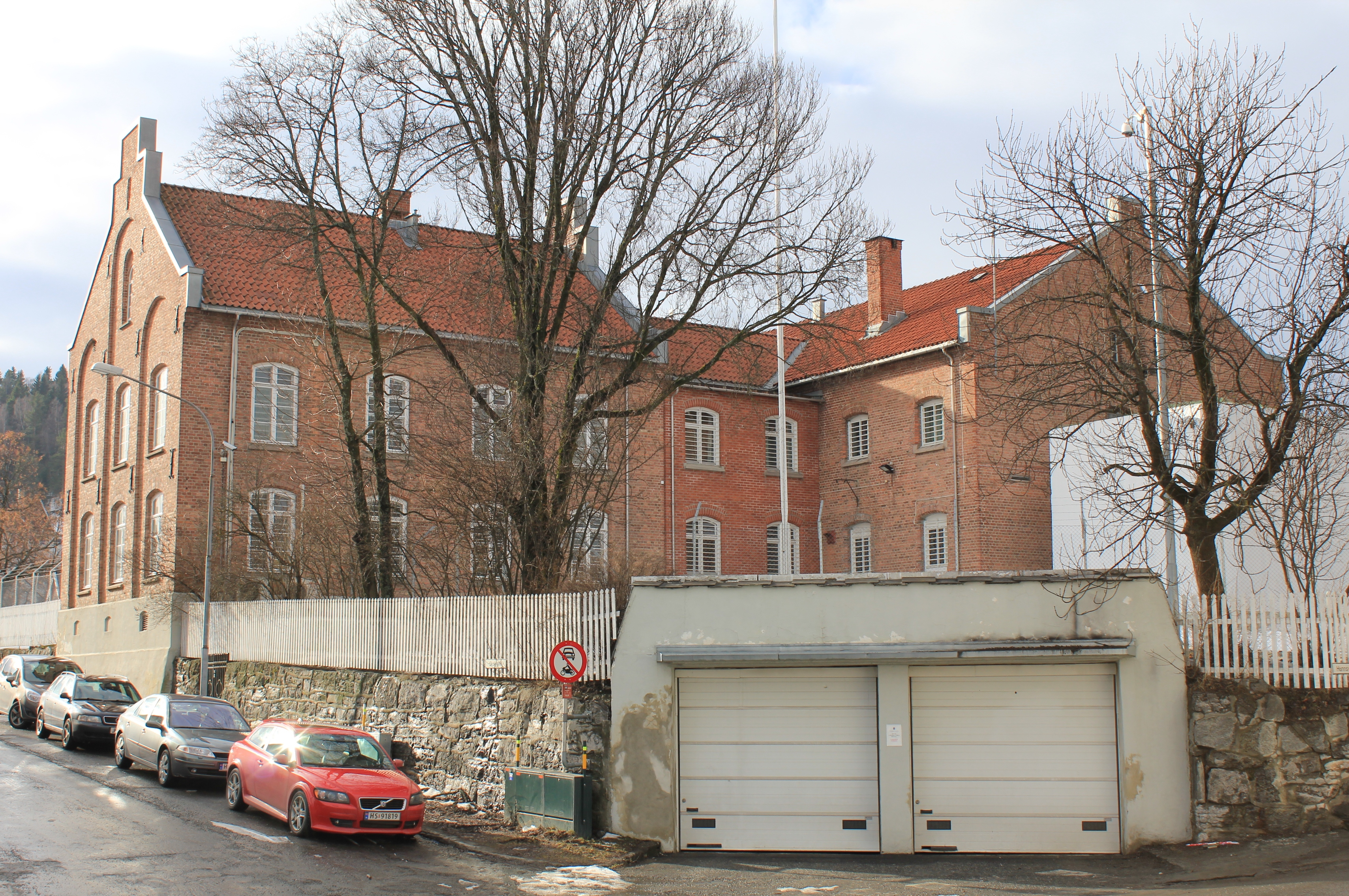

Vestoppland Prison (Norwegian: Vestoppland fengsel) is a prison in the county of Innlandet, Norway. It consists of two correctional facilities, located in Gjøvik and Valdres. The facility in Valdres is a lower security prison, while the facility in Gjøvik has a higher security level.
