= Sigurd Einbu =

Norwegian astronomer

Sigurd Einbu (November 5, 1866 – May 10, 1946) (spelled Enebue at birth), was a Norwegian self-taught astronomer from Lesjaskog, known to have discovered a nova in the stellar constellation Gemini on March 12, 1912. The nova was named Nova Geminorum 2. Also in 1912 he introduced a new class of variable stars, the RV Tauri variable stars. He spelled his family name Enebo during large parts of his scientific career, but in 1926 he changed it to Einbu according to the local pronunciation.

Einbu attended Hamar offentlige lærerskole, and worked as a teacher in Øyer, Vågå and Sel before returning to his home community Dombås. He took an interest in astronomy at an early age, but could not devote himself fully to astronomy until he was appointed statsstipendiat (Government scholar) in 1908. He was a founding member of Norsk Novaselskap. He established and ran a magnetic monitoring station at Dombås from 1916.

During his lifetime he was a people's educator and wrote frequently in newspapers and popular journals.

His childhood house Einbustugu has been moved from Lesjaskog to Dombås, and is today a museum in his memory.

== Awards ==
Sigurd Einbu was awarded

- Lindemannsprisen granted at the meeting of the Astronomische Gesellschaft in Jena in 1906
- Atenogenes-Silva medaljen from Sociedad Astronomica de Mexico in 1912
- Fridtjof Nansen Prize for Outstanding Research from Nansenfondet awarded by Videnskapsakademiet i Kristiania in 1926.
- Gunnerus Medal from Royal Norwegian Society of Sciences and Letters in Trondheim in 1934.
- Honorary member of Norwegian Astronomical Society in Oslo on May 5, 1938.

== Literature ==
- Stjernegransking i gamall og ny tid. 1911 (Norwegian)
- Vår sol. 1922 (Norwegian)
- Gjennem stjerneverdenen. 1: Vor sol og dens følge. 1923 (Norwegian)
- Vår måne. 1923 (Norwegian)
- Gjennem stjerneverdenen. 2: Melkeveiens soler: (fiksstjernene). 1924 (Norwegian)
- Beobachtungen veränderlicher Sterne I – XIV (German)
- Bebodde verdener i nytt lys. 1928 (Norwegian)
- Soler og atom. 1930 (Norwegian)
- 250 in den Jahren 1903–1941 in Norwegen beobachtete Feuerkugeln: Errechnung der Radianten u. a.. 1942 (German)
- Dovre kommune gjennom hundreåret 1837–1937. 1949 (Norwegian)
- Lesja: litt frå den kommunale soga 1838–1938, og ymse anna. 1949 (Norwegian)

About Einbu

- R. Tambs Lyche. "Sigurd Einbu: Minnetale" I: Det Kongelige norske videnskabers selskabs forhandlinger; vol. 19. 1946 (Norwegian)
