= Steinahøfjellet =

Mountain in Innlandet, Norway

- Interactive map of the mountain

Highest point
- Elevation: 1,711 m (5,614 ft)
- Prominence: 52 m (171 ft)
- Coordinates: 61°43′02″N 8°07′06″E

Geography
- Location: Innlandet, Norway
- Parent range: Breheimen

Steinahøfjellet is a mountain in Lom Municipality in Innlandet county, Norway. The 1,711-metre (5,614 ft) tall mountain is located in the Breheimen mountains within the Breheimen National Park. It is located about 8 kilometres (5.0 mi) northwest of the village of Elvesæter and about 25 kilometres (16 mi) southwest of the village of Fossbergom. The mountain is surrounded by several other notable mountains including Storhøi to the east, Sandgrovhøi and Hesthøi to the northeast, Hestbreapiggan to the northwest, Steindalshøe and Svartdalshøe to the west, and Merrahøi to the southwest.

== See also ==
- List of mountains of Norway
