= Grjothøi =

Mountain in Skjåk, Norway

- Grothøe
- Interactive map of the mountain

Highest point
- Elevation: 1,943 m (6,375 ft)
- Prominence: 323 m (1,060 ft)
- Parent peak: Hestdalshøgdi
- Isolation: 3.7 km (2.3 mi)
- Coordinates: 61°50′10″N 8°04′22″E

Geography
- Location: Innlandet, Norway
- Parent range: Breheimen

Grjothøi is a mountain in Skjåk Municipality in Innlandet county, Norway. The 1,943-metre (6,375 ft) tall mountain is located in the Breheimen mountains and inside the Breheimen National Park, about 11 kilometres (6.8 mi) southwest of the village of Bismo. The mountain is surrounded by several other notable mountains including Gjuvkampen to the northeast; Tverrfjellet to the east; Moldulhøi, Sandgrovhøi, and Hesthøi to the southeast, and Hestdalshøgdi to the southwest.

== See also ==
- List of mountains of Norway
