= Steindalshøe =

Mountain in Innlandet, Norway

- Steindalshøi (unofficial)
- Interactive map of the mountain

Highest point
- Elevation: 1,889 m (6,198 ft)
- Prominence: 68 m (223 ft)
- Parent peak: Hestbrepiggene
- Isolation: 1.3 km (0.81 mi)
- Coordinates: 61°42′47″N 7°58′53″E

Geography
- Location: Innlandet, Norway
- Parent range: Breheimen

Steindalshøe is a mountain in Lom Municipality in Innlandet county, Norway. The 1,889-metre (6,198 ft) tall mountain is located in the Breheimen mountains within the Breheimen National Park. It is located about 25 kilometres (16 mi) southwest of the village of Bismo and about 15 kilometres (9.3 mi) west of the village of Elvesæter and about 350 metres (1,150 ft) southeast of the municipal border with Skjåk Municipality. The mountain is surrounded by several other notable mountains including Merrahøi and Svartdalshøe to the southwest, Vesldalstinden and Holåtindan to the northwest, Hestbreapiggan and Låven to the northeast, and Steinahøfjellet to the east.

== See also ==
- List of mountains of Norway
