= Vesldalstinden =

Mountain in Innlandet, Norway

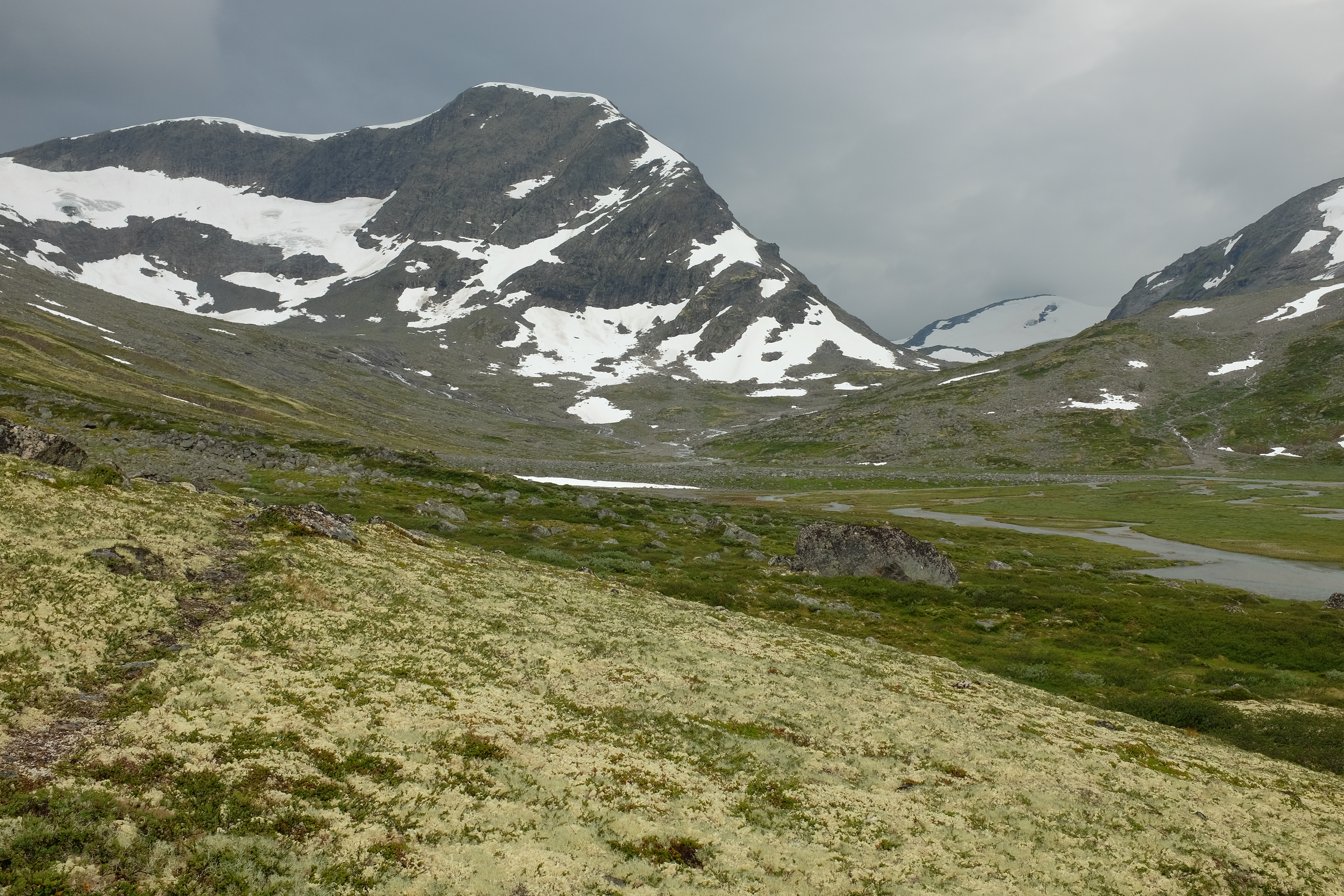
- View of the mountain

Highest point
- Elevation: 1,805 m (5,922 ft)
- Prominence: 198 m (650 ft)
- Parent peak: Hestbrepiggene
- Isolation: 2.2 km (1.4 mi)
- Coordinates: 61°43′50″N 7°56′34″E

Geography
- Interactive map of the mountain
- Location: Innlandet, Norway
- Parent range: Breheimen

Vesldalstinden is a mountain in Skjåk Municipality in Innlandet county, Norway. The 1,805-metre (5,922 ft) tall mountain is located in the Breheimen mountains and inside the Breheimen National Park, about 25 kilometres (16 mi) southwest of the village of Bismo. The mountain is surrounded by several other notable mountains including Gjelhøi to the north, Holåtindan to the northwest, Merrahøi to the southwest, Steindalshøe and Svartdalshøe to the southeast, and Låven and Hestbreapiggan to the east.

== See also ==
- List of mountains of Norway
