= Svartdalshøe =

Mountain in Innlandet, Norway

- Interactive map of the mountain

Highest point
- Elevation: 1,671 m (5,482 ft)
- Prominence: 77 m (253 ft)
- Parent peak: Hestbrepiggene
- Isolation: 1.1 km (0.68 mi)
- Coordinates: 61°41′40″N 7°58′13″E

Geography
- Location: Innlandet, Norway
- Parent range: Breheimen

Svartdalshøe is a mountain in Lom Municipality in Innlandet county, Norway. The 1,671-metre (5,482 ft) tall mountain is located in the Breheimen mountains within the Breheimen National Park. It is located about 26 kilometres (16 mi) southwest of the village of Bismo and about 17 kilometres (11 mi) west of the village of Elvesæter. The mountain is surrounded by several other notable mountains including Merrahøi to the west, Vesldalstinden and Holåtindan to the northwest, Steindalshøe and Hestbrepiggan to the northeast, and Steinahøfjellet to the east.

== See also ==
- List of mountains of Norway
