= Merrahøi =

Mountain in Innlandet, Norway

- Merrahøe
- Interactive map of the mountain

Highest point
- Elevation: 1,695 m (5,561 ft)
- Prominence: 276 m (906 ft)
- Parent peak: Hestbreapiggan
- Isolation: 4.8 km (3.0 mi)
- Coordinates: 61°41′00″N 7°54′50″E

Geography
- Location: Innlandet, Norway
- Parent range: Breheimen

Merrahøi is a mountain on the border of Skjåk Municipality and Lom Municipality in Innlandet county, Norway (just east of the border with Luster Municipality in Vestland county). The 1,695-metre (5,561 ft) tall mountain is located in the Breheimen mountains within the Breheimen National Park. It is located about 30 kilometres (19 mi) southwest of the village of Bismo and about 20 kilometres (12 mi) west of the village of Elvesæter. The mountain is surrounded by several other notable mountains including Vetledalsnosi to the west, Holåtindan to the northwest, Vesldalstinden to the north, and Svartdalshøe, Steindalshøe, and Hestbreapiggan to the northeast.

== See also ==
- List of mountains of Norway
