= Gjuvkampen =

Mountain in Skjåk, Norway

- Interactive map of the mountain

Highest point
- Elevation: 1,739 m (5,705 ft)
- Prominence: 59 m (194 ft)
- Parent peak: Grjothøi
- Isolation: 0.962 km (0.598 mi)
- Coordinates: 61°51′36″N 8°07′49″E

Geography
- Location: Innlandet, Norway
- Parent range: Breheimen

Gjuvkampen is a mountain in Skjåk Municipality in Innlandet county, Norway. The 1,739-metre (5,705 ft) tall mountain is located in the Breheimen mountains and inside the Breheimen National Park, about 7 kilometres (4.3 mi) southwest of the village of Bismo. The mountain is surrounded by several other notable mountains including Tverrfjellet to the south, Grjothøi to the southwest, and Lomseggje to the southeast.

== See also ==
- List of mountains of Norway
