= Storhøe (Lom) =

Mountain in Innlandet, Norway

- Storhøi
- Interactive map of the mountain

Highest point
- Elevation: 1,770 m (5,810 ft)
- Prominence: 396 m (1,299 ft)
- Parent peak: Hestbrepiggene
- Isolation: 4.2 km (2.6 mi)
- Coordinates: 61°45′38″N 8°18′32″E

Geography
- Location: Innlandet, Norway
- Parent range: Breheimen

Storhøe is a mountain in Lom Municipality in Innlandet county, Norway. The 1,770-metre (5,810 ft) tall mountain is located in the Breheimen mountains within the Breheimen National Park. It is located about 13 kilometres (8.1 mi) south of the village of Bismo and about 16 kilometres (9.9 mi) southwest of the village of Fossbergom. The mountain is surrounded by several other notable mountains including Lendfjellet to the north; Lomseggje to the northeast; Lauvhøe to the east; Galdhøpiggen to the south; Steinahøfjellet to the west, and Hesthøi, Sandgrovhøi, and Moldulhøi to the northwest.

== See also ==
- List of mountains of Norway
