= Lendfjellet =

Mountain in Innlandet, Norway

- Interactive map of the mountain

Highest point
- Elevation: 1,973 m (6,473 ft)
- Prominence: 70 m (230 ft)
- Parent peak: Storivilen
- Isolation: 1.6 km (0.99 mi)
- Coordinates: 61°48′56″N 8°17′54″E

Geography
- Location: Innlandet, Norway
- Parent range: Breheimen

Lendfjellet is a mountain on the border of Skjåk Municipality and Lom Municipality in Innlandet county, Norway. The 1,973-metre (6,473 ft) tall mountain is located in the Breheimen mountains within the Breheimen National Park. It is located about 8 kilometres (5.0 mi) south of the village of Bismo and about 14 kilometres (8.7 mi) southwest of the village of Fossbergom. The mountain is surrounded by several other notable mountains including Lomseggje to the east, Storhøe to the south, Moldulhøi and Sandgrovhøi to the southwest. The Lendbreen glacier lies to the east of the mountain.

== See also ==
- List of mountains of Norway
