= Lendbreen =

Glacier in Jotunheimen, Norway

- Interactive map of the glacier
- Location: Innlandet, Norway
- Coordinates: 61.81878°N 8.31317°E
- Highest elevation: 1,845 m (6,053 ft)

Lendbreen is an area of dead ice on the border of Lom Municipality and Skjåk Municipality in Innlandet county, Norway. The area is a former mountain pass and hunting grounds located between the mountains Lendfjellet and Storivilen a few kilometers south of the village of Bismo in Skjåk Municipality.

== History ==
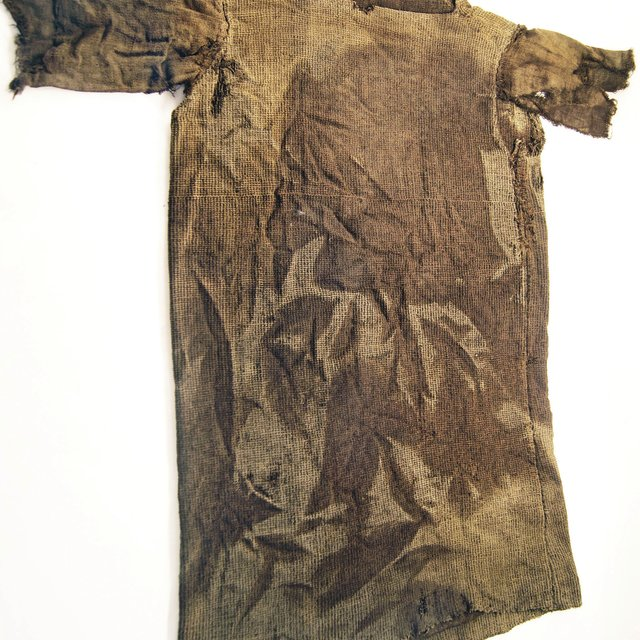
The c. 300 ad Leendbreen tunic was found in 2011.

From 300 AD to 1500 AD, Lendbreen was used as a mountain pass. In the 2010s, artifacts from up to 2,000 years ago were found here, because of melting in the area. Most of the items date from 300 to 1500 A.D.
