= Moldulhøi =

Mountain in Innlandet, Norway

- Moyldurhøe / Moldurhø / Moldulhøe
- Interactive map of the mountain

Highest point
- Elevation: 2,044 m (6,706 ft)
- Prominence: 144 m (472 ft)
- Parent peak: Lomseggje
- Isolation: 4.8 km (3.0 mi)
- Coordinates: 61°48′30″N 8°16′07″E

Geography
- Location: Innlandet, Norway
- Parent range: Breheimen

Moldulhøi is a mountain on the border of Skjåk Municipality and Lom Municipality in Innlandet county, Norway. The 2,044-metre (6,706 ft) tall mountain is located in the Breheimen mountains and inside the Breheimen National Park, about 9 kilometres (5.6 mi) south of the village of Bismo. The mountain is surrounded by several other notable mountains including Lomseggje and Lendfjellet to the east, Storhøe to the south, Sandgrovhøi and Hesthøi to the southwest, Hestdalshøgdi to the west, and Tverrfjellet to the northwest.

== See also ==
- List of mountains of Norway
