= Gjelhøi =

Mountain in Skjåk, Norway

- Gjelhøe
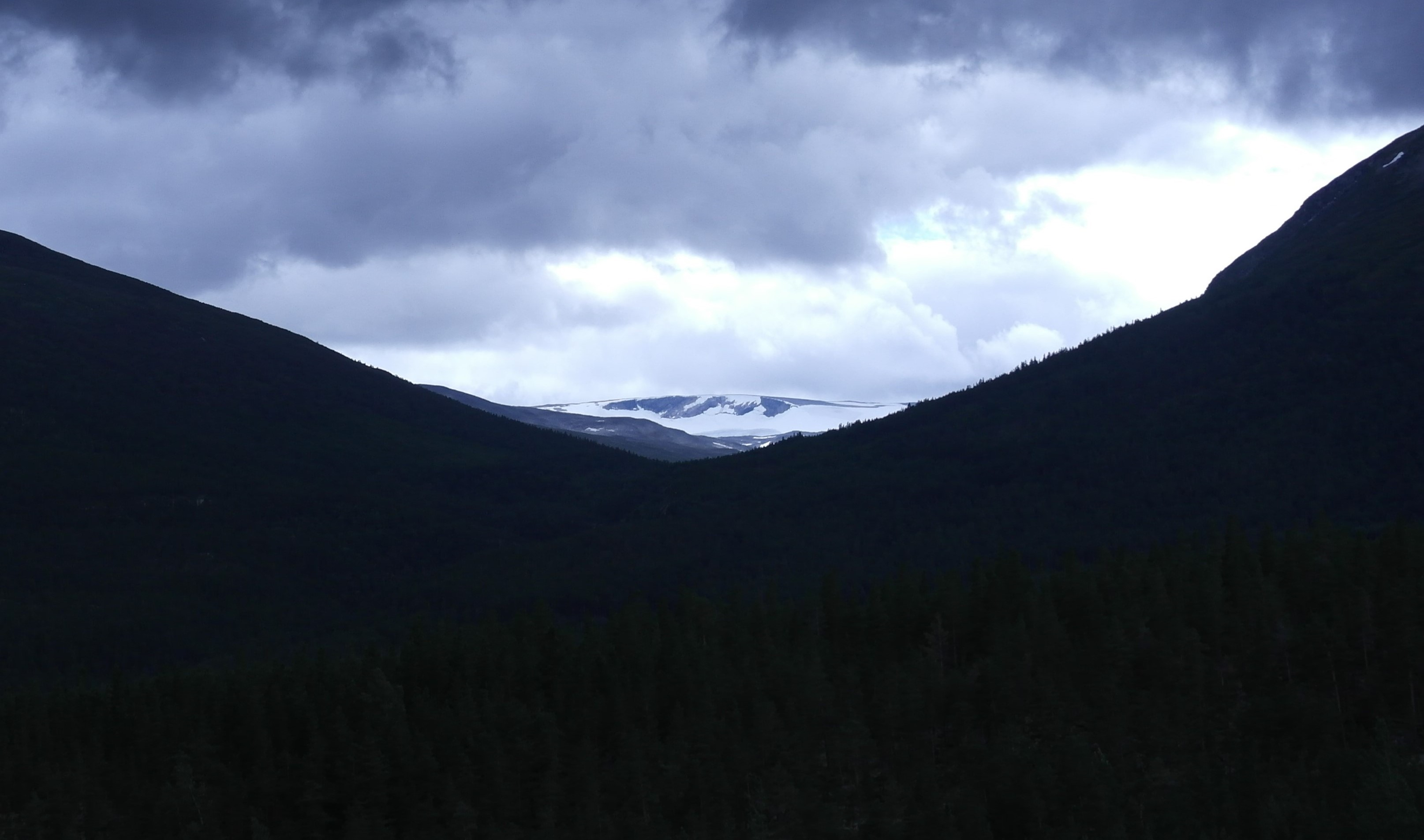
- Gjelhøi as seen from Åmot, Skjåk

Highest point
- Elevation: 1,982 m (6,503 ft)
- Prominence: 180 m (590 ft)
- Parent peak: Holåtindan
- Isolation: 3 km (1.9 mi) to Austre Holåtinden
- Coordinates: 61°46′19″N 7°55′23″E

Geography
- Interactive map of the mountain
- Location: Innlandet, Norway
- Parent range: Breheimen

Gjelhøi is a mountain in Skjåk Municipality in Innlandet county, Norway. The 1,982-metre (6,503 ft) tall mountain is located in the Breheimen mountains and inside the Breheimen National Park, about 22 kilometres (14 mi) southwest of the village of Bismo and about 30 kilometres (19 mi) north of the village of Fortun. The mountain is surrounded by several other notable mountains including Hestdalshøgdi and Låven to the northeast, Hestbreapiggan to the southeast, Holåtindan to the southwest, and Tundradalskyrkja to the west. The Holåbreen glacier lies between this mountain and the nearby Holåtindan.

== See also ==
- List of mountains of Norway
