= Sandgrovhøi =

Mountain in Innlandet, Norway

- Sandgrovhøe
- Interactive map of the mountain

Highest point
- Elevation: 1,954 m (6,411 ft)
- Prominence: 55 m (180 ft)
- Parent peak: Hesthøi
- Isolation: 1.2 km (0.75 mi)
- Coordinates: 61°47′04″N 8°13′50″E

Geography
- Location: Innlandet, Norway
- Parent range: Breheimen

Sandgrovhøi is a mountain on the border of Skjåk Municipality and Lom Municipality in Innlandet county, Norway. The 1,954-metre (6,411 ft) tall mountain is located in the Breheimen mountains and inside the Breheimen National Park, about 11 kilometres (6.8 mi) south of the village of Bismo. The mountain is surrounded by several other notable mountains including Lomseggje, Lendfjellet, and Moldulhøi to the northeast, Storhøe to the southeast, Hesthøi and Hestbreapiggan to the southwest, and Hestdalshøgdi and Tverrfjellet to the northwest.

== See also ==
- List of mountains of Norway
