= Låven =

Mountain in Innlandet, Norway

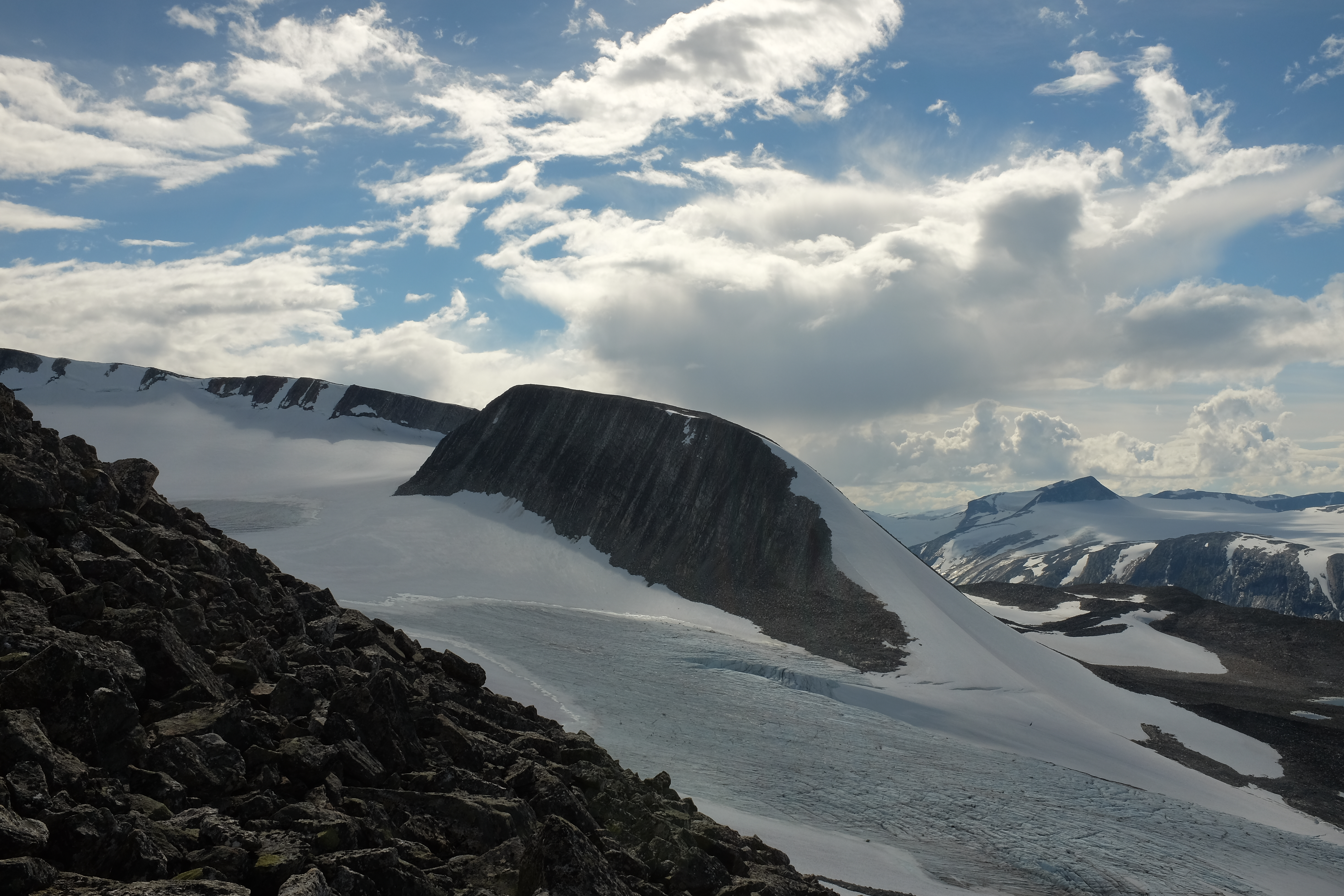
- Låven summit seen from the east

Highest point
- Elevation: 2,012 m (6,601 ft)
- Prominence: 50 m (160 ft)
- Parent peak: Hestbrepiggene
- Isolation: 0.69 km (0.43 mi)
- Coordinates: 61°45′09″N 8°03′04″E

Geography
- Interactive map of the mountain
- Location: Innlandet, Norway
- Parent range: Breheimen

Låven is a mountain in Skjåk Municipality in Innlandet county, Norway. The 2,012-metre (6,601 ft) tall mountain is located in the Breheimen mountains and inside the Breheimen National Park, about 19 kilometres (12 mi) southwest of the village of Bismo. The mountain is surrounded by several other notable mountains including Hesthøi to the northeast, Hestbreapiggan to the south, Holåtindan to the west, Gjelhøi to the northwest, and Hestdalshøgdi to the north.

== See also ==
- List of mountains of Norway
