= Hestdalshøgdi =

Mountain in Skjåk, Norway

- Hestdalshøgde
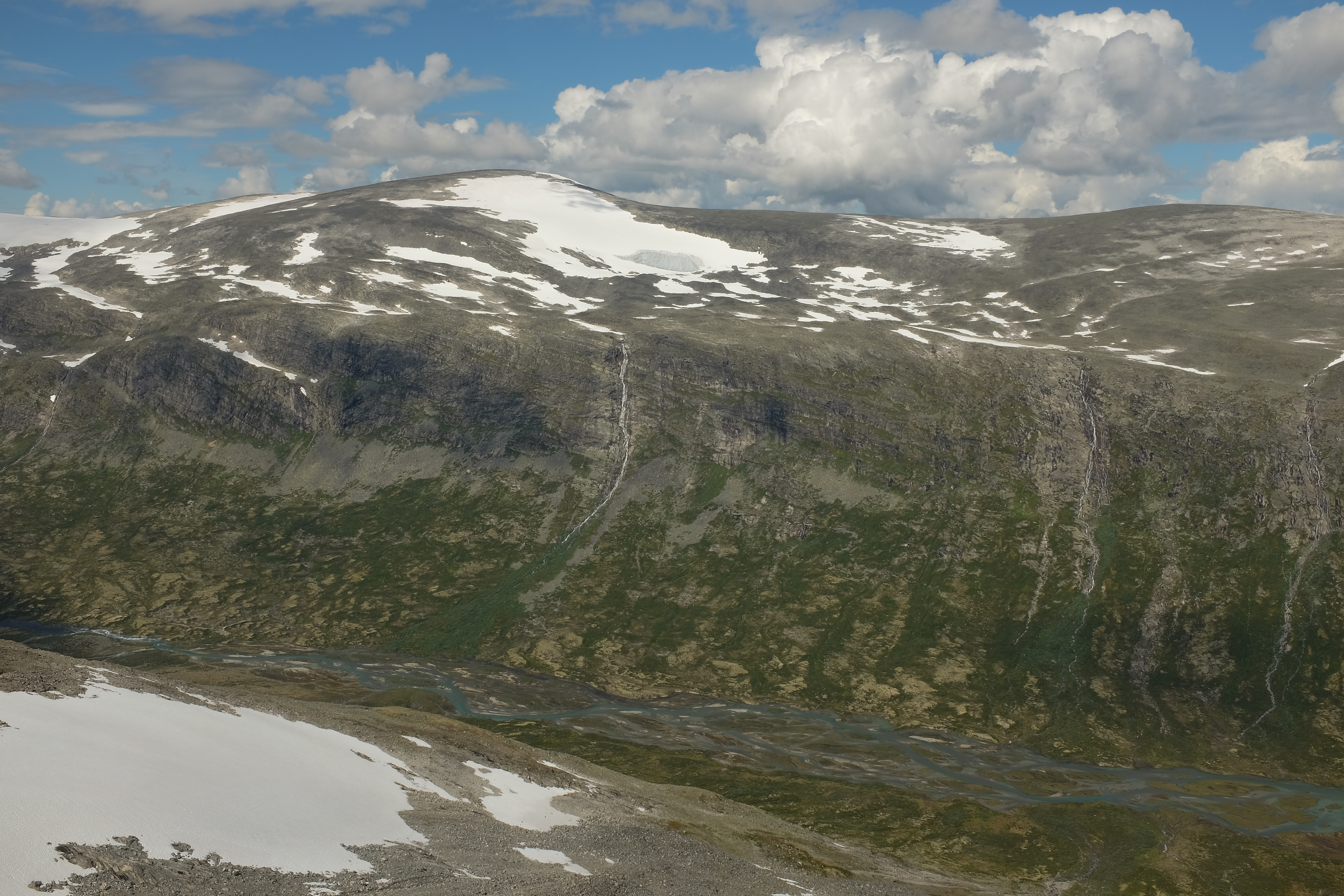
- Hestdalshøgdi mountain seen from south

Highest point
- Elevation: 2,097 m (6,880 ft)
- Prominence: 657 m (2,156 ft)
- Isolation: 6 km (3.7 mi)
- Coordinates: 61°48′03″N 8°02′11″E

Geography
- Interactive map of the mountain
- Location: Innlandet, Norway
- Parent range: Breheimen

Hestdalshøgdi is a mountain in Skjåk Municipality in Innlandet county, Norway. The 2,097-metre (6,880 ft) tall mountain is located in the Breheimen mountains and inside the Breheimen National Park, about 15 kilometres (9.3 mi) southwest of the village of Bismo. The mountain is surrounded by several other notable mountains including Grjothøi, Tverrfjellet, and Gjuvkampen to the northeast; Moldulhøi, Sandgrovhøi, and Hesthøi to the east; Hestbreapiggan and Låven to the south; and Gjelhøi to the southwest.

== See also ==
- List of mountains of Norway
