= Lomseggje =

Mountain in Innlandet, Norway

- Lomseggi / Storivilen
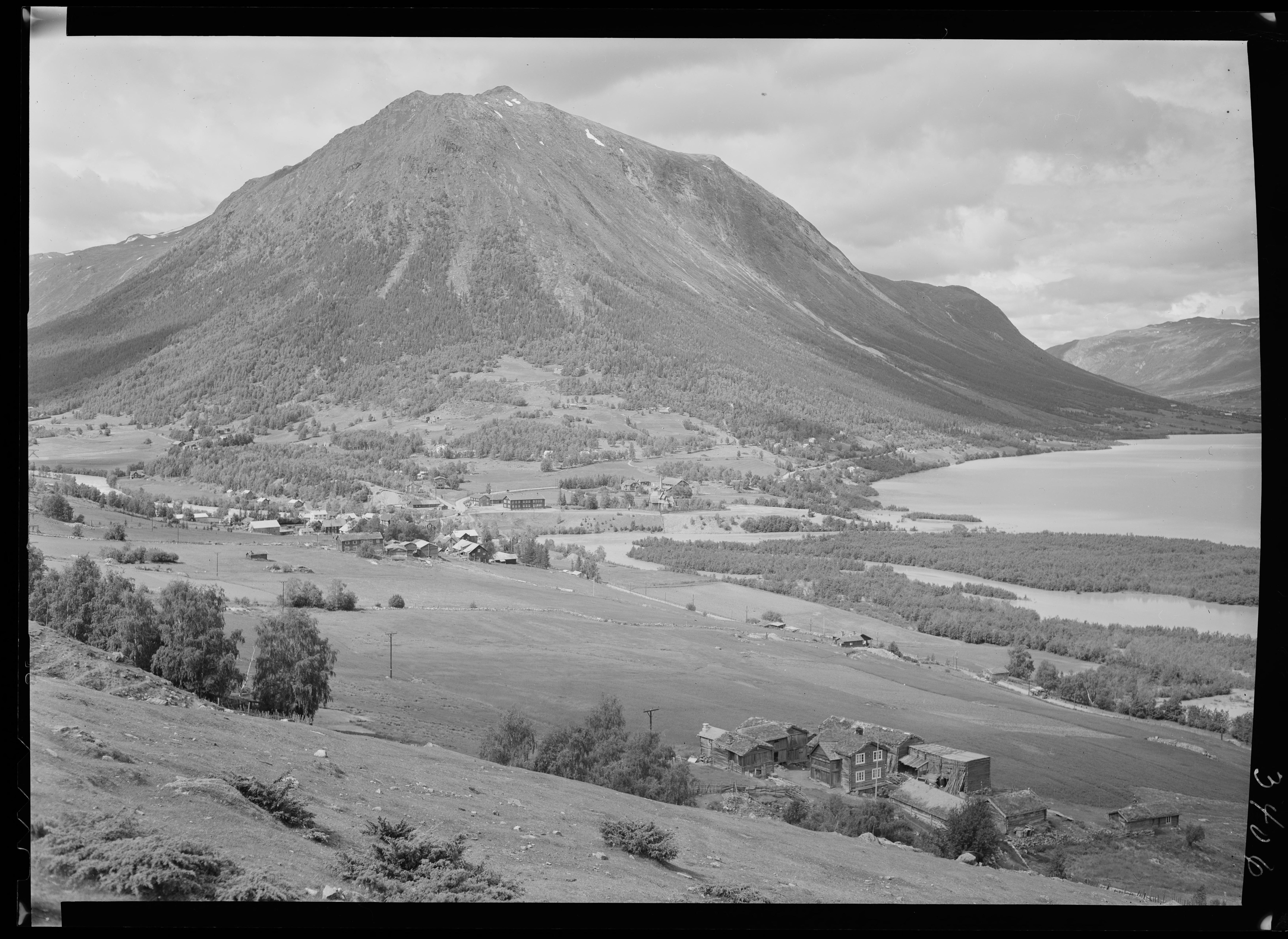
- View of the mountain (c. 1940s)

Highest point
- Elevation: 2,068 m (6,785 ft)
- Prominence: 294 m (965 ft)
- Parent peak: Hestbreapiggene
- Isolation: 15.2 km (9.4 mi)
- Coordinates: 61°49′57″N 8°26′49″E

Geography
- Interactive map of the mountain
- Location: Innlandet, Norway
- Parent range: Breheimen

Lomseggje is a mountain ridge on the border of Skjåk Municipality and Lom Municipality in Innlandet county, Norway.

The highest point of the ridge is the 2,068-metre (6,785 ft) tall peak Storivilen. The ridge is located in the Breheimen mountains and inside the Breheimen National Park, about 9 kilometres (5.6 mi) southeast of the village of Bismo and about 10 kilometres (6.2 mi) southwest of the village of Lom. The mountain is surrounded by several other notable mountains including Storhøi to the south; Lendfjellet, Moldulhøi, and Sandgrovhøi to the southwest; Hestdalshøgdi and Tverrfjellet to the west. The Lendbreen glacier lies along the ridge.

== See also ==
- List of mountains of Norway
