= Tverrfjellet (Skjåk) =

Mountain in Skjåk, Norway

- Tverrfjell
- Interactive map of the mountain

Highest point
- Elevation: 1,903 m (6,243 ft)
- Prominence: 43 m (141 ft)
- Parent peak: Grjothøi
- Isolation: 3.1 km (1.9 mi)
- Coordinates: 61°50′32″N 8°06′38″E

Geography
- Location: Innlandet, Norway
- Parent range: Breheimen

Tverrfjellet is a mountain in Skjåk Municipality in Innlandet county, Norway. The 1,903-metre (6,243 ft) tall mountain is located in the Breheimen mountains and inside the Breheimen National Park, about 9 kilometres (5.6 mi) southwest of the village of Bismo. The mountain is surrounded by several other notable mountains including Gjuvkampen to the north, Lomseggje to the east, Moldulhøi and Sandgrovhøi to the southeast, Hesthøi to the south, Hestdalshøgdi to the southwest, and Grjothøi.

== See also ==
- List of mountains of Norway
