= Laven =

Laven may refer to:

== Geography ==
- Laven, a railway town in Central Jutland, Denmark
- Låven, a mountain of Oppland, Norway

== Linguistics ==
- Laven language, a Mon–Khmer language of Laos

== People ==
- Arnold Laven (1922-2009), American film and television director and producer
- Lea Laven (b. 1948), Finnish pop singer
