= Holåbreen =

Glacier in Skjåk and Luster, Norway

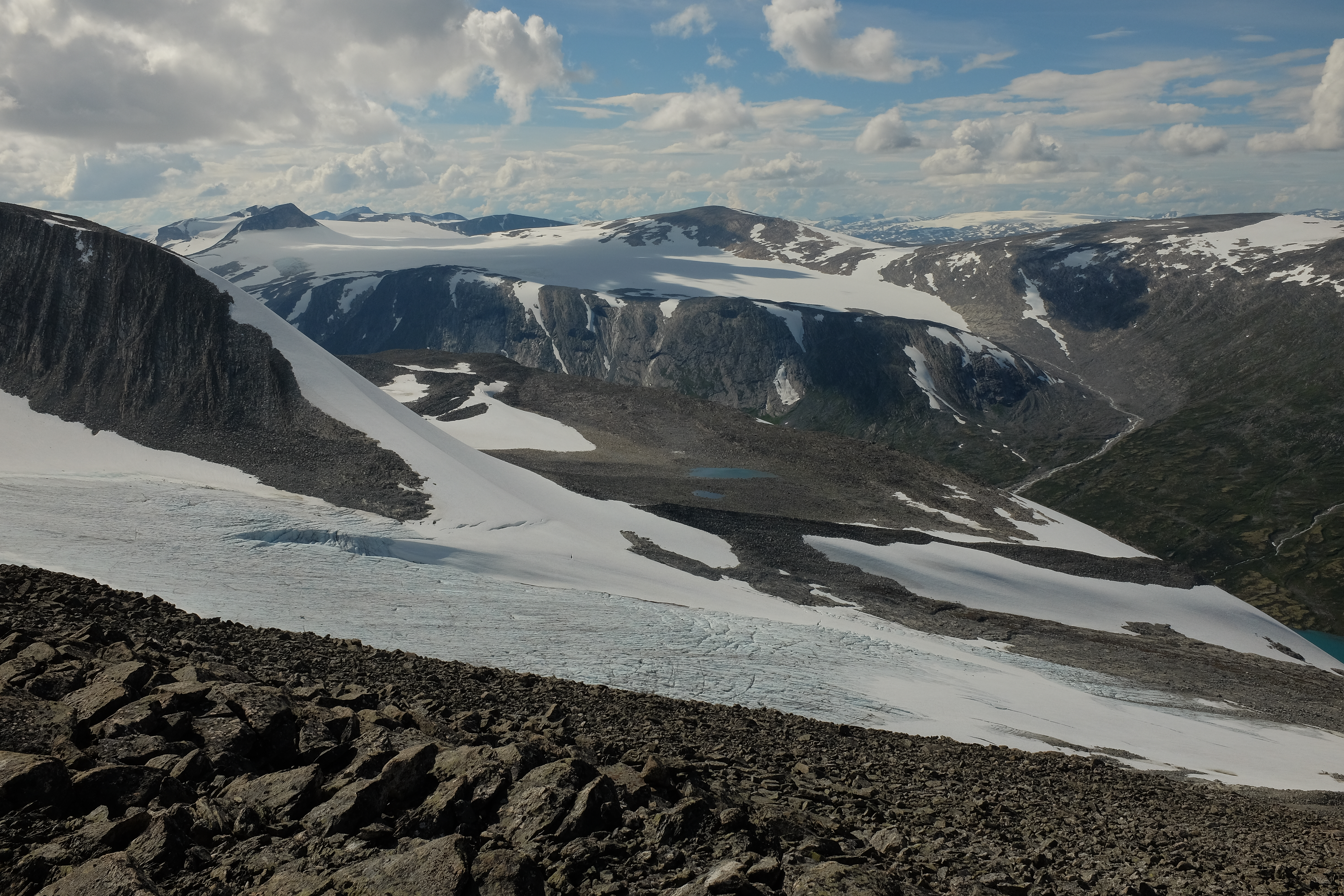
- Eastern part of the glacier
- Interactive map of the glacier
- Location: Vestland and Innlandet, Norway
- Coordinates: 61°45′24″N 7°54′09″E
- Area: 20 km^{2} (7.7 sq mi)

Holåbreen is a glacier in the Breheimen mountain range of Norway. It is located on the border of Skjåk Municipality in Innlandet county and Luster Municipality in Vestland county. The 20-square-kilometre (7.7 sq mi) glacier lies between the mountains Gjelhøi and Holåtindan.

== See also ==
- List of glaciers in Norway
