= Hestbrepiggan =

Mountain ridge in Innlandet, Norway

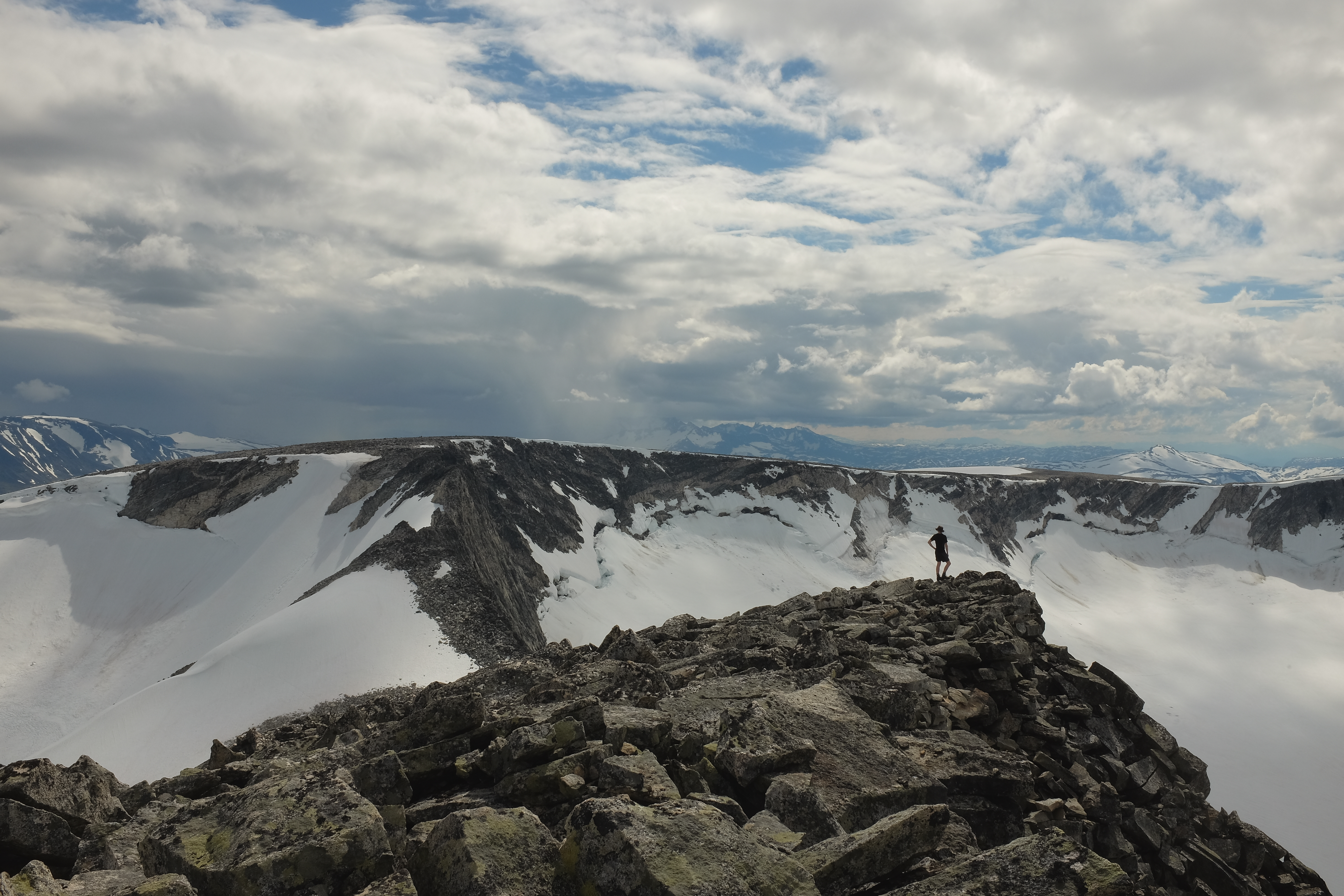
- Midtre Hestbreapiggen seen from Nørdre Hestbreapiggen

Highest point
- Elevation: 2,172 m (7,126 ft)
- Prominence: 872 m (2,861 ft)
- Isolation: 14.2 km (8.8 mi) to Storgrovhøe
- Listing: #1 in Breheimen National Park
- Coordinates: 61°45′01″N 8°05′09″E

Geography
- Interactive map of the mountain
- Location: Innlandet, Norway
- Parent range: Breheimen

Hestbreapiggan is a mountain ridge on the border of Skjåk Municipality and Lom Municipality in Innlandet county, Norway. The ridge consists of seven peaks, with the highest one, Nørdre Hestbreapiggen reaching an elevation of 2,172-metre (7,126 ft). The mountain is located in the Breheimen mountains and inside the Breheimen National Park, about 20 kilometres (12 mi) southwest of the village of Bismo. The mountain is surrounded by several other notable mountains including Hesthøi to the northeast, Storhøe to the east; Merrahøi, Svartdalshøe, and Steindalshøe to the southwest; Holåtindan and Vesldalstinden to the west; Gjelhøi to the northwest; and Låven and Hestdalshøgdi to the north.

== See also ==
- List of mountains of Norway
