= Holåtindan =

Mountain in Skjåk, Norway

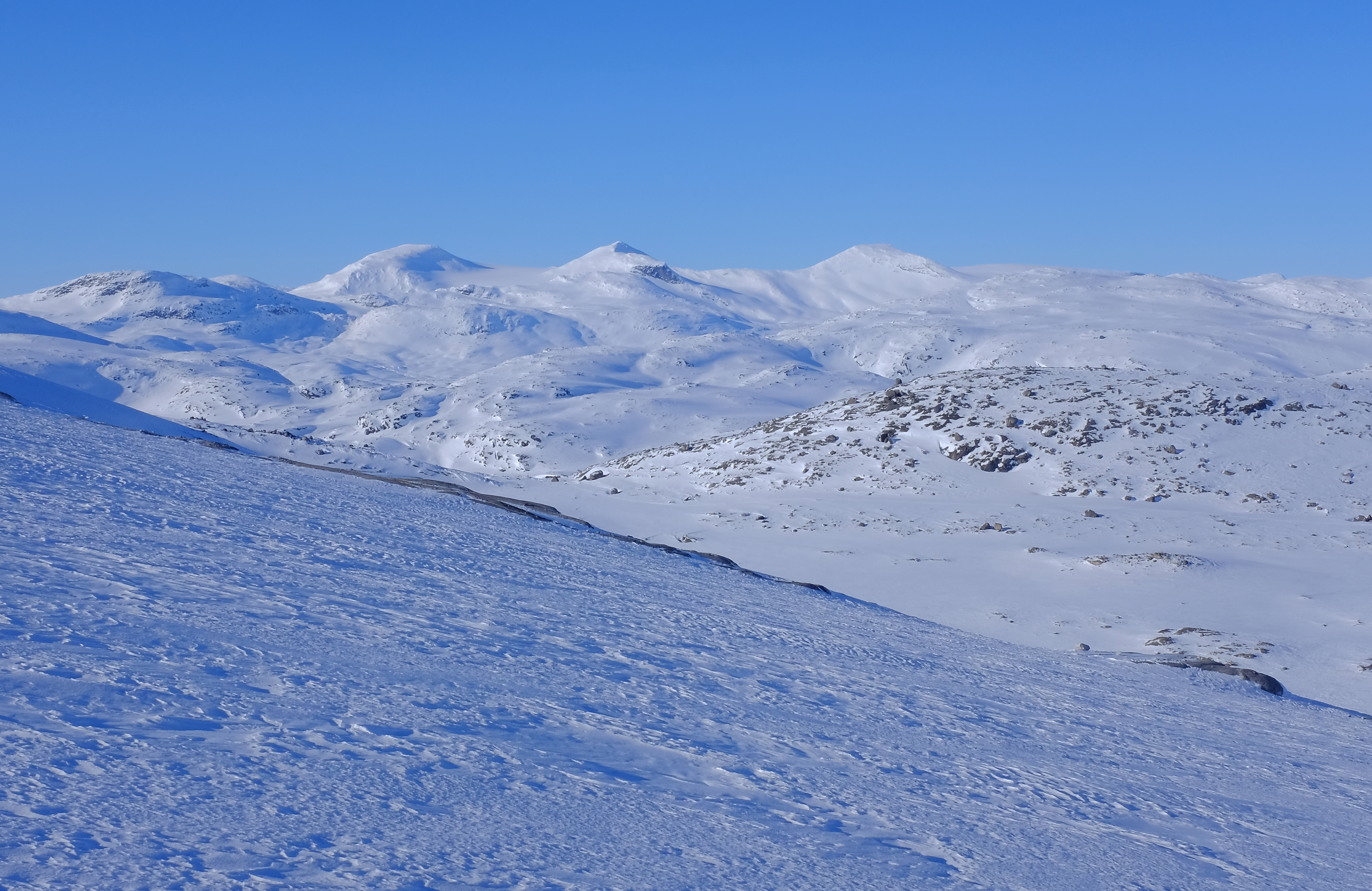
- View of the Holåtindan mountains

Highest point
- Elevation: 2,047 m (6,716 ft)
- Prominence: 285 m (935 ft)
- Parent peak: Hestdalshøgdi
- Isolation: 6.8 km (4.2 mi) to Hestbrepiggan
- Coordinates: 61°44′38″N 7°53′04″E

Geography
- Interactive map of the mountain
- Location: Innlandet, Norway
- Parent range: Breheimen

Holåtindan is a mountain in Skjåk Municipality in Innlandet county, Norway. The 2,047-metre (6,716 ft) tall mountain is located in the Breheimen mountains and inside the Breheimen National Park, about 26 kilometres (16 mi) southwest of the village of Bismo and about 30 kilometres (19 mi) north of the village of Fortun. The mountain consists of three peaks: Vestre Holåtinden (2039 m), Midtre Holåtinden (2047 m), and Austre Holåtinden (2043 m). The mountain is surrounded by several other notable mountains including Gjelhøi to the northeast, Hestbreapiggan to the east, Vesldalstinden to the southeast, and Tundradalskyrkja to the northwest. The Holåbreen and Ytre Gjelåbreen glaciers lie between this mountain and the nearby Gjelhøi. The Holåbreen glacier extends westward and stretches between the two westernmost of the Holåtinden peaks, Vestre and Midtre Holåtindan.

== See also ==
- List of mountains of Norway
