= Elvesæter =

Village in Lom Municipality, Norway

- Village
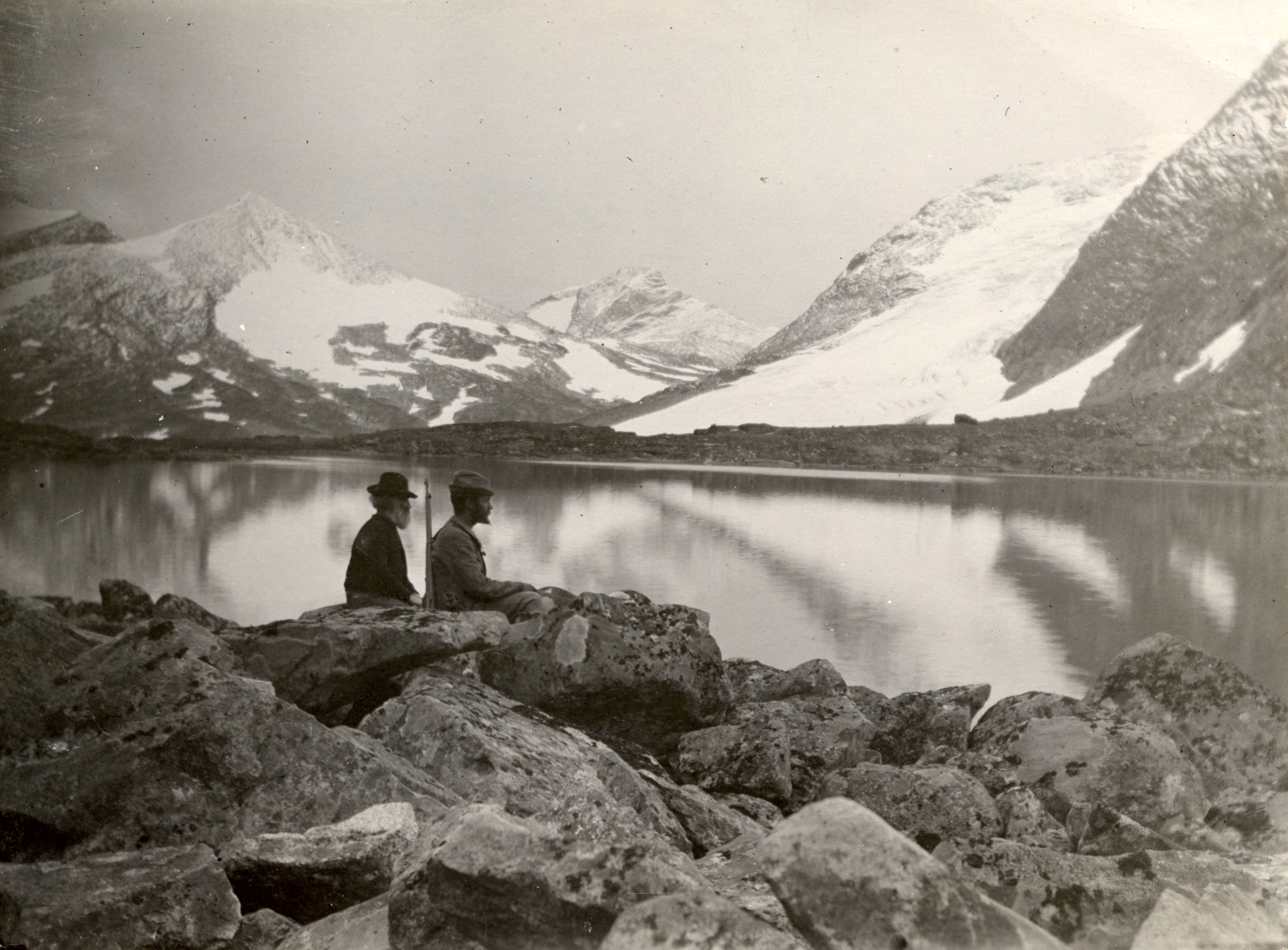
- View of the village area
- Interactive map of Elvesæter
- Location within Innlandet Location within Norway
- Coordinates: 61.70428°N 8.2854°E
- Country: Norway
- Region: Eastern Norway
- County: Innlandet
- District: Gudbrandsdalen
- Municipality: Lom Municipality
- Elevation: 669 m (2,195 ft)
- Time zone: UTC+01:00 (CET)
  - Summer (DST): UTC+02:00 (CEST)
- Post Code: 2687 Bøverdalen

Elvesæter is a village in Lom Municipality in Innlandet county, Norway. The village is located at the junction of the Bøverdalen and Leirdalen valleys, about 23 kilometres (14 mi) southwest of the village of Fossbergom. The small village area lies in the Jotunheimen mountains, just north of Jotunheimen National Park. The village lies about 8 kilometres (5.0 mi) north of Galdhøpiggen, the tallest mountain in Norway.

The village is the site of a large hotel which was the site of the 12th World Scout Conference in 1949.
