= Breheimen National Park =

National park in Norway

- IUCN category II (national park)

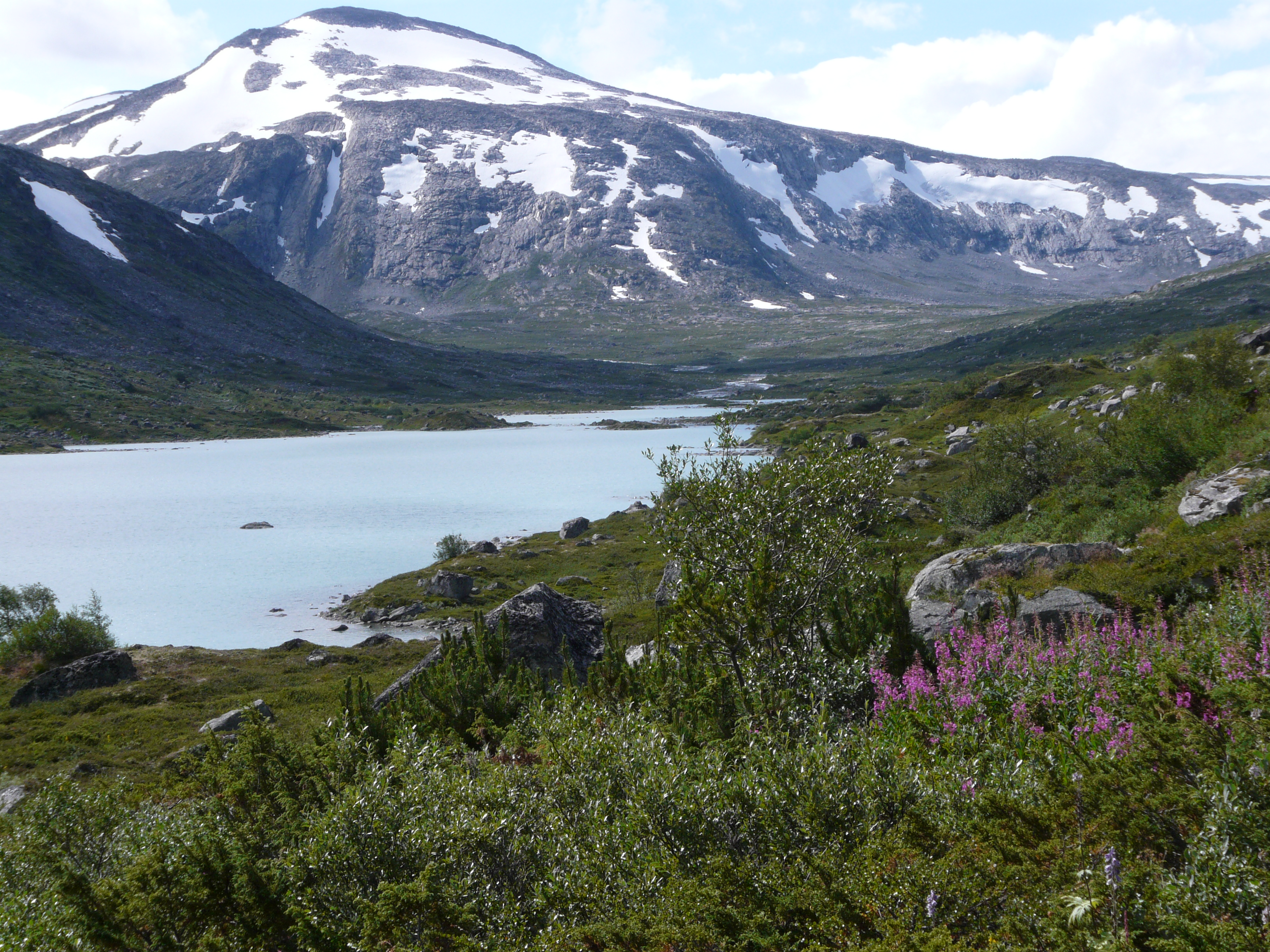
- Gamle Strynefjellsvegen
- Interactive map of Breheimen National Park
- Location: Innlandet and Vestland, Norway
- Nearest city: Skjolden, Bismo
- Coordinates: 61.7195°N 7.0967°E
- Area: 1,671 km^{2} (645 sq mi)
- Established: 2009
- Governing body: Directorate for Nature Management

Breheimen National Park (Norwegian: Breheimen nasjonalpark) (lit. 'Home of The Glaciers') is a national park that was established in 2009. The park is located in Skjåk Municipality and Lom Municipality in Innlandet county and in Luster Municipality in Vestland county, Norway. The park covers 1,671 square kilometres (645 sq mi) of the Breheimen mountain range. The park encompasses some of the wettest and driest terrain in the country, with landscapes shaped over hundreds of thousands of years by glaciers, avalanches and other geological processes. Visitors encounter everything from lush transhumance‑farmed valleys to barren plateaus, soaring peaks and active glaciers.

== History ==
Breheimen was first proposed as a national park in the Government's Second National Park Plan (white paper 1986), which was adopted by the Storting in 1992. Actual planning was delayed until 2005, when the Directorate for Nature Management charged the County Governors of Sogn og Fjordane and Oppland with preparing a formal proposal. Under a 1999 government directive to strengthen local involvement, the 2005–2009 process featured extensive stakeholder participation (including land‑owners, municipal and county bodies, and NGOs) and even led to the proposal of an on‑site information centre in Mørkridsdalen. The park was officially designated by Royal decree in August 2009.

The formation of the park in August 2009 prompted Skjåk Municipality—within whose borders most of the park falls—to reorient its development planning towards nature‑based branding and infrastructure. Initiatives included the "Skjåk 79 – a pure experience!" marketing campaign (alluding to the 79 % of the municipality under protection) and the establishment of a competence and resource centre for environmental management alongside the park's administration.

== Archaeology ==
Archaeological evidence attests to human use of these mountains since the end of the last Ice Age. Most notably, in summer 2011 a well‑preserved man's coat dating to about 300 AD was recovered from a melting glacier bed, now the oldest extant garment found in Norway. Remains of medieval sælehus shelters and ancient reindeer‑hunting traps are also visible.

== Visitor use ==
During the summer of 2016, visitor use of Breheimen National Park was surveyed using twelve self‑registration boxes deployed at the park's principal entry points, followed by an internet‑based follow‑up study. The on‑site survey yielded 2836 completed questionnaires, and 364 follow‑up responses were received (response rate 50.7 %). Respondents had a mean age of 44 years and 79 % held a university or college education. Norwegians comprised 58 % of on‑site respondents while foreign visitors accounted for 42 %, and first‑time visitors represented 54 % of the total.

Hiking was the dominant activity (83 % of respondents), with peak ascents (8 %) and fitness‑oriented walks (7 %) the next most common pursuits. Day trips constituted 74 % of visits (average duration 4.6 hours), and multi‑day stays averaged 4.9 days. Key motivations included experiencing wilderness, dramatic mountain landscapes and a sense of freedom, and visitors placed great importance on well‑marked trails and clear signposting for ease and safety. The internet was the chief source of pre‑trip information, supplemented by guidebooks and tourist information centres.
