= Bismo =

Village in Skjåk, Norway

- Village
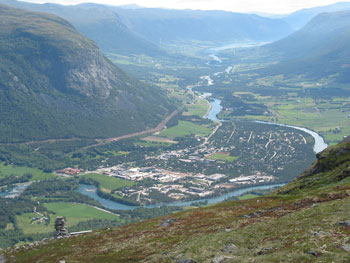
- View of the village
- Interactive map of Bismo
- Location within Innlandet Location within Norway
- Coordinates: 61.88406°N 8.26665°E
- Country: Norway
- Region: Eastern Norway
- County: Innlandet
- District: Gudbrandsdalen
- Municipality: Skjåk Municipality

Area
  - Total: 1.23 km^{2} (0.47 sq mi)
- Elevation: 400 m (1,300 ft)

Population (2024)
  - Total: 631
  - Density: 513/km^{2} (1,330/sq mi)
- Time zone: UTC+01:00 (CET)
  - Summer (DST): UTC+02:00 (CEST)
- Post Code: 2690 Skjåk

Bismo is a village that serves as the administrative centre of Skjåk Municipality in Innlandet county, Norway. The village is located along the river Otta in the Ottadalen valley, about 40 kilometres (25 mi) east of the village of Grotli and about 17 kilometres (11 mi) west of the village of Fossbergom.

The 1.23-square-kilometre (300-acre) village has a population (2024) of 631 and a population density of 513 inhabitants per square kilometre (1,330/sq mi).

The Norwegian National Road 15 runs through the village. The lake Aursjoen lies on the mountain plateau just north of the village and the mountain Tverrfjellet lies just south of the village. Skjåk Church lies just east of the village.

== Climate ==
Data for nearby Bråtå weather station. Bismo has a dry summer subarctic climate (Dsc). Spring and early summer are the driest time of year and fall and winter are the wettest. The coldest month, January, averages −8.8 °C (16.2 °F) while the warmest month, July, averages 11.7 °C (53.1 °F).

Climate data for Bråtå 1961-1990, extremes 1968-2010
Month	Jan	Feb	Mar	Apr	May	Jun	Jul	Aug	Sep	Oct	Nov	Dec	Year
Record high °C (°F)	8.2 (46.8)	7.7 (45.9)	10.0 (50.0)	15.5 (59.9)	21.6 (70.9)	27.0 (80.6)	27.0 (80.6)	27.0 (80.6)	23.2 (73.8)	17.4 (63.3)	10.0 (50.0)	7.3 (45.1)	27.0 (80.6)
Mean daily maximum °C (°F)	−5.7 (21.7)	−4.0 (24.8)	−0.1 (31.8)	3.7 (38.7)	10.1 (50.2)	14.8 (58.6)	16.3 (61.3)	15.4 (59.7)	10.0 (50.0)	4.9 (40.8)	−1.2 (29.8)	−3.7 (25.3)	5.0 (41.1)
Mean daily minimum °C (°F)	−11.8 (10.8)	−11.1 (12.0)	−7.7 (18.1)	−4.1 (24.6)	1.5 (34.7)	5.5 (41.9)	7.1 (44.8)	6.7 (44.1)	3.0 (37.4)	−0.6 (30.9)	−6.7 (19.9)	−9.9 (14.2)	−2.3 (27.8)
Record low °C (°F)	−35.0 (−31.0)	−28.0 (−18.4)	−23.5 (−10.3)	−17.8 (0.0)	−11.0 (12.2)	−2.6 (27.3)	−4.6 (23.7)	−1.6 (29.1)	−8.7 (16.3)	−16.0 (3.2)	−24.0 (−11.2)	−35.8 (−32.4)	−35.8 (−32.4)
Average precipitation mm (inches)	62 (2.4)	37 (1.5)	43 (1.7)	15 (0.6)	21 (0.8)	33 (1.3)	43 (1.7)	45 (1.8)	55 (2.2)	62 (2.4)	61 (2.4)	71 (2.8)	548 (21.6)
Average precipitation days	10.6	7.3	7.6	3.5	5.0	7.2	8.7	8.7	10.5	10.6	10.7	11.6	102
Source: Met Norway Eklima
