= Gade (surname) =

Gade is a surname. Notable people with the surname include:

- Alexandra Gade (born 1974), nuclear physicist
- Fredrik Georg Gade (businessman) (1830–1905), Norwegian businessman
- Fredrik Georg Gade (1855–1933), Norwegian physician
- Fredrik Herman Gade (1871–1943), Norwegian diplomat
- Herman Gerhard Gade (1870–1953), Norwegian physician
- John Allyne Gade (1875–1955), American architect, naval officer, diplomat and author
- Ludvig Gade (1823–1897), Danish dancer and mime
- Marten Gäde (born 1986), German politician
- Niels Wilhelm Gade (1817–1890), Danish composer and musician
- Jacob Gade (1879–1963), Danish violinist and composer of Tango Jalousie
- Peter Gade (born 1976), Danish badminton player
- Per Gade (born 1977), Danish footballer
- Mary Gade, director of the Illinois Environmental Protection Agency from 1991 to 1999, and plaintiff in Gade v. National Solid Wastes Mgt. Ass'n

== See also ==
- Gade (disambiguation)
- Gade (artist)
