= Fredrik Gade =

Fredrik Gade may refer to:

- Fredrik Georg Gade (businessman) (1830–1905), Norwegian businessman and politician
- Fredrik Georg Gade (1855–1933), his son, Norwegian physician
- Fredrik Herman Gade (1871–1943), Norwegian-American attorney and diplomat
