= 1150s in architecture =

- 1140s
- 1150s in architecture
- 1160s

Architecture timeline

== Buildings and structures ==
=== Buildings ===
- c. 1150
  - Roof lantern of Florence Baptistery constructed.
  - Romanesque church of Saint-Nectaire, Puy-de-Dôme, France built.
  - Fantoft Stave Church built at Fortun in Norway.
  - St Mary's parish church, Cholsey, England, substantially constructed.
- c. 1150–1160
  - Church of St. Stephen at Marmoutier Abbey, Alsace, constructed.
  - Bisaldeo temple in Vigrahapura, Sapadalaksha, constructed.
- 1151
  - Anping Bridge in China completed.
  - Restoration of St. George's Basilica, Prague, with twin towers, completed following siege damage in 1142.
  - Zamora Cathedral in Spain begun.
- 1152 – Great St. Martin Church, Cologne begun.
- 1153 – Pisa Baptistry in Italy begun by Diotisalvi.
- 1155 – Basilica of San Michele Maggiore, Pavia, Italy completed. It is one of the best surviving examples of Lombard Romanesque architecture.
- 1156 – In France:
  - Senlis Cathedral begun.
  - Reconstruction of Château de Chinon begun.
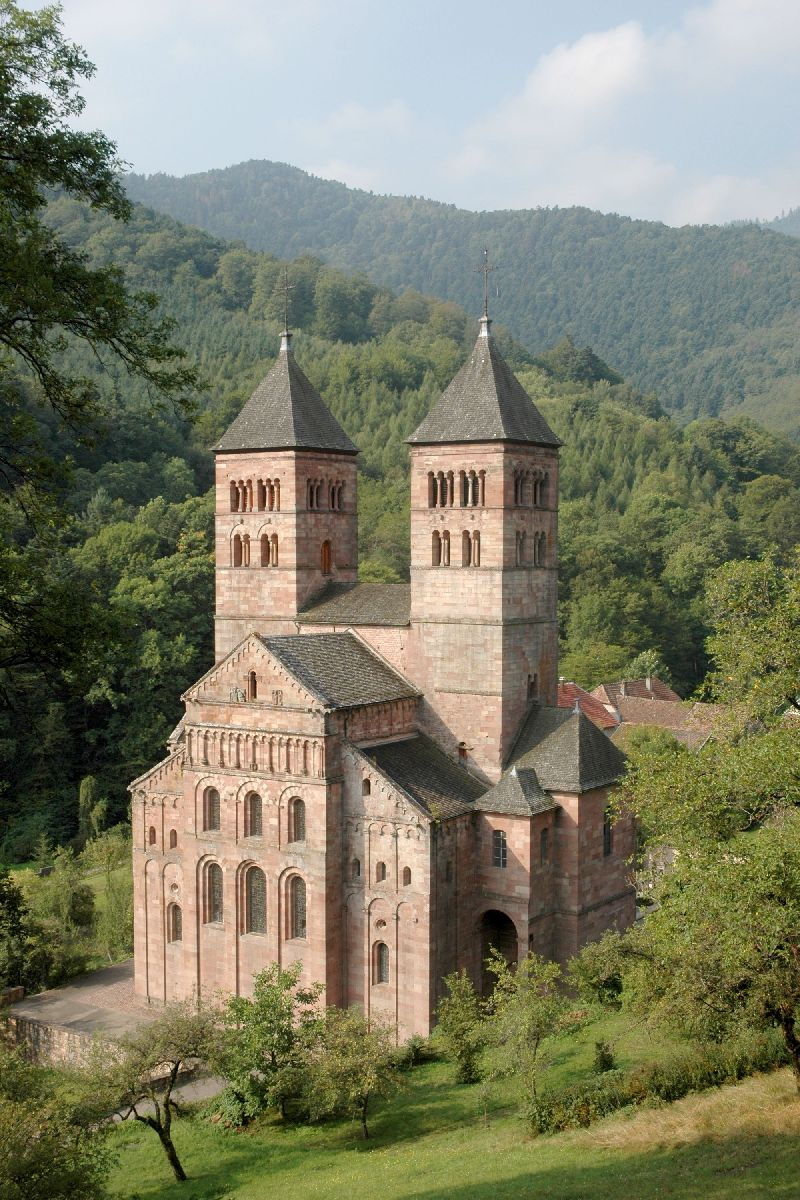
Murbach Abbey (1150)

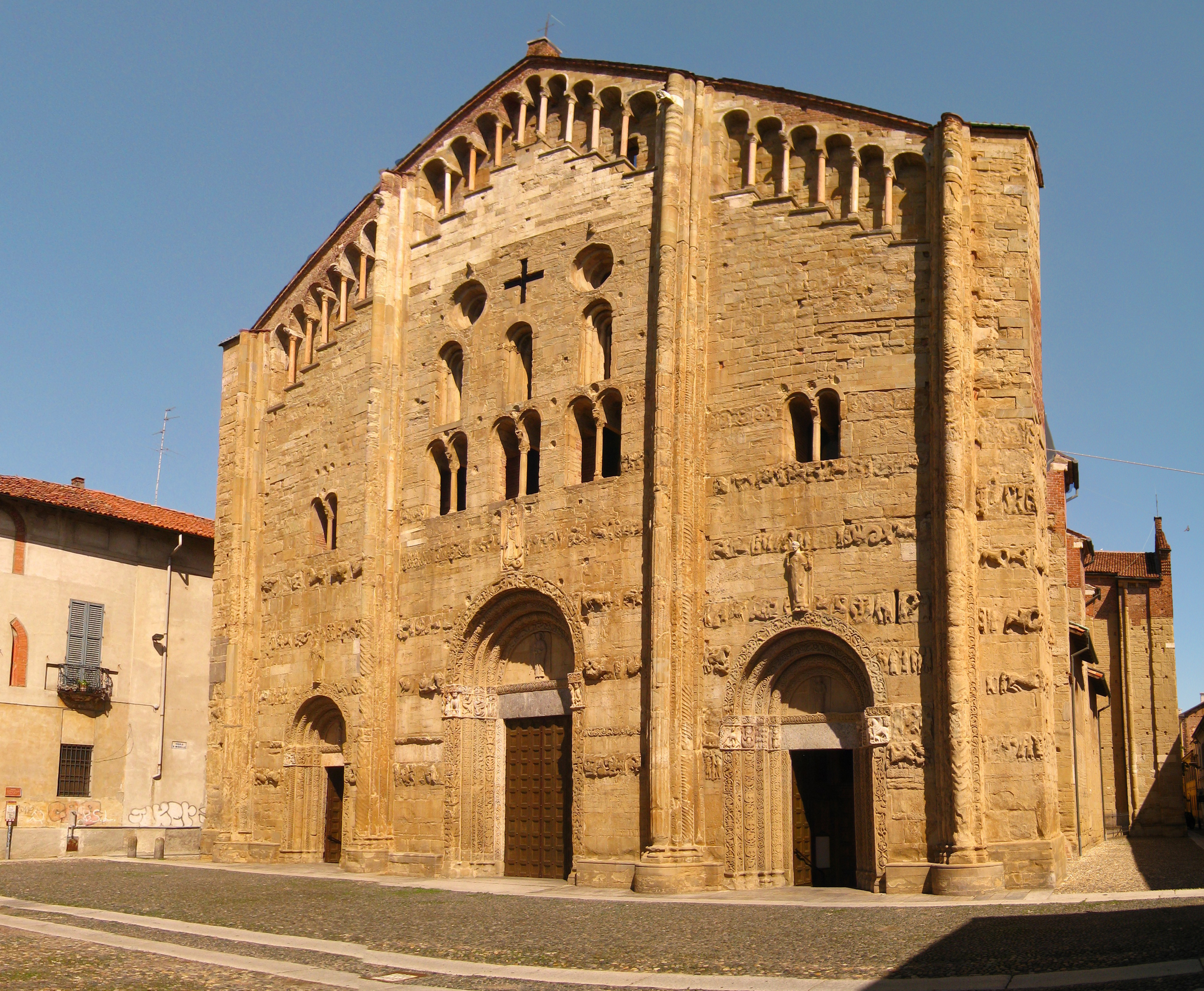
Basilica of San Michele Maggiore, Pavia (1155)

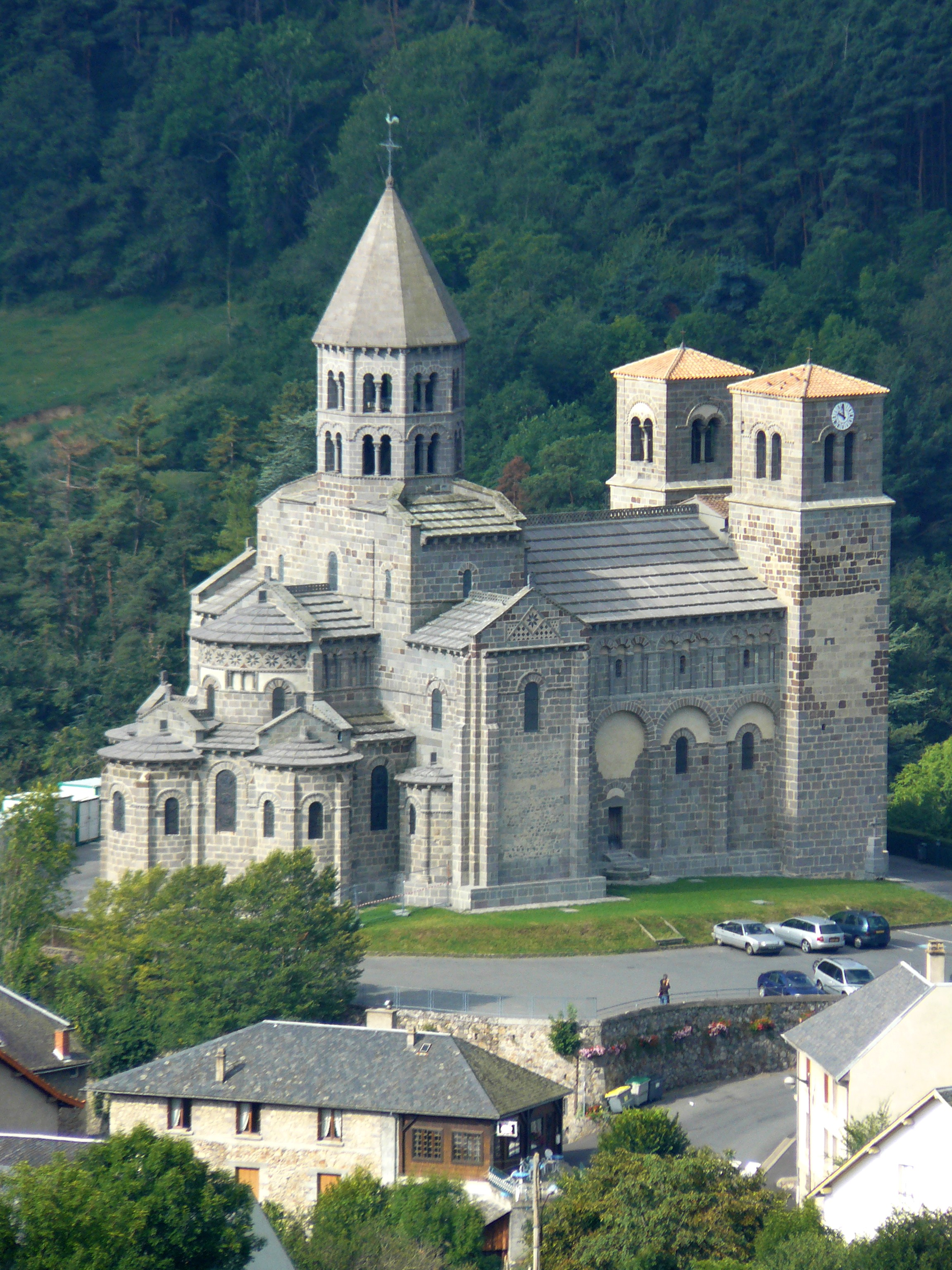
St.-Nectaire church (c. 1150)

== Deaths ==
- January 13, 1151 – Abbot Suger (b. c.1081), French abbot-statesmen and patron of Gothic architecture.
