= Fredrik Meltzer Wallem =

Norwegian journalist and writer

Fredrik Meltzer Wallem (19 April 1837 – 2 April 1922) was a Norwegian journalist and writer, known for his work for fisheries of Norway.

He was born in Bergen as the son of businessperson Johan Nordahl Wallem and his wife Emma Meltzer. He spent time at sea between 1853 and 1860, but then enrolled as a law student in 1861 and graduated with the cand.jur. degree in 1866. He started a career as a journalist in Morgenbladet from 1864 to 1867, and was the editor-in-chief of Bergensposten from 1868 to 1871 and 1872 to 1875. From 1886 to 1887 he edited Christiania Intelligenssedler, and from 1886 to 1890 Ny illustreret Tidende.

Having a background as a seaman, he wrote and reported extensively about fisheries issues, both through newspapers, books and lectures. Among other issues, he is credited with as the first describer of the purse seine in Norway, in 1877, long before it was actually introduced. From 1891 to 1896 he worked as the State Inspector of Saltwater Fisheries in Trondhjem; he also sat as a member of Trondhjem city council as well as the Royal Norwegian Society of Sciences and Letters. He was behind the foundation of Trondhjem Biological Station and the Norwegian Directorate of Fisheries in 1900, and served on the board of directors of the former entity.

In March 1877 he married Louise Adelaide Barbe, daughter of a French-American father and a German-American mother. Their son Fredrik Barbe Wallem became a notable art historian. His sister Ingeborg married businessperson Fredrik Georg Gade. Through her, he was an uncle of Fredrik Georg Gade, Jr. and Herman Gerhard Gade.
