= Gade =

Gade may refer to:

- The Gade people
- Gade (surname)
- Gadê County, in Qinghai, China
- River Gade, in southern England
- "Gade", a song by Croatian singer Severina Vučković
- Gade language, a language of Nigeria
- Gade (born 1971), Tibetan artist

== See also ==
- Gades (disambiguation)
