= Fortun Church =

Church in Vestland, Norway

- Fortun kyrkje
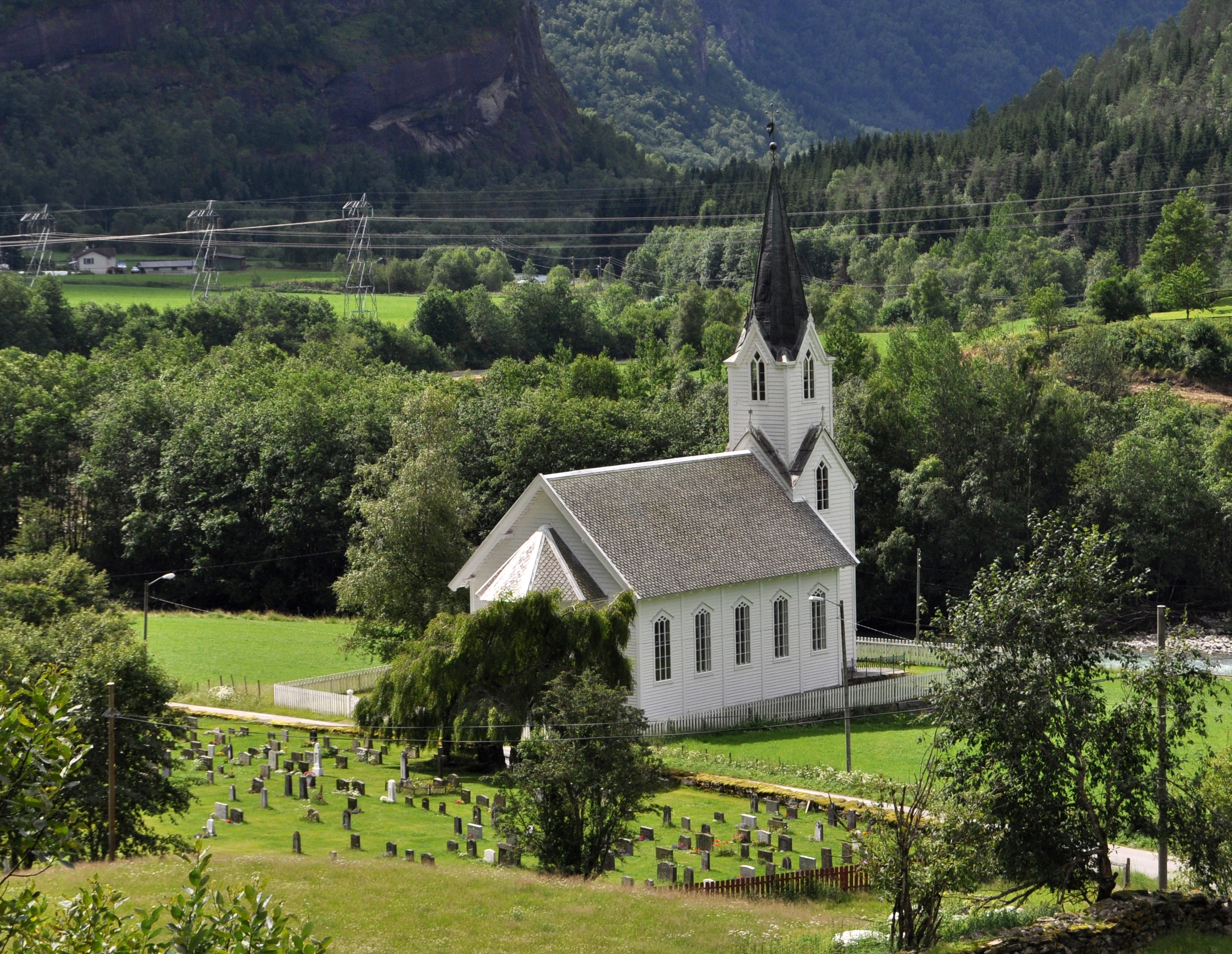
- View of the church
- Fortun Church
- 61°29′35″N 7°41′12″E
- Location: Luster Municipality, Vestland
- Country: Norway
- Denomination: Church of Norway
- Previous denomination: Catholic Church
- Churchmanship: Evangelical Lutheran

History
- Status: Parish church
- Founded: 12th century
- Consecrated: 1879

Architecture
- Functional status: Active
- Architect: Erik Pedersen Rusten
- Architectural type: Long church
- Completed: 1879 (147 years ago)

Specifications
- Capacity: 250
- Materials: Wood

Administration
- Diocese: Bjørgvin bispedømme
- Deanery: Sogn prosti
- Parish: Fortun
- Norwegian Cultural Heritage Site
- Type: Church
- Status: Not protected
- ID: 84185

Fortun Church (Norwegian: Fortun kyrkje) is a parish church of the Church of Norway in Luster Municipality in Vestland county, Norway. It is located in the village of Fortun. It is the church for the Fortun parish which is part of the Sogn prosti (deanery) in the Diocese of Bjørgvin. The white, wooden church was built in a long church design in 1879 using plans drawn up by the architect Erik Pedersen Rusten. The church seats about 250 people.

== History ==
The earliest existing historical records of the church date back to the year 1323, but it was not new that year. The first church was a wooden stave church that was likely built sometime between 1160 and 1180. The original building had a rectangular nave measuring 16.5 by 5.5 metres (54 ft × 18 ft) and a slightly narrower 4.5-metre (15 ft) wide choir. The original church stood about 100 metres (330 ft) northeast of the present location of the church. Around 1650, a new tower was built on the church. In 1666, the choir was torn down and replaced with a larger timber-framed room, the same width as the nave. In 1696–1698, the church porch was torn down and rebuilt. Over time, the church became too small for the congregation and it was decided to replace it.

A new church was built about 100 metres (330 ft) southwest of the old church, a little closer to the river. The new church was completed and consecrated on 6 June 1879. It was designed by Erik Pedersen Ruste. After its completion, the parish offered to sell the old church to the Society for the Preservation of Ancient Norwegian Monuments, but the Society could not afford it. Then, the decision was made to tear down the old church, but there was some controversy about this decision. Eventually, it was torn down, but the consul Fredrik Georg Gade bought most of the building materials and moved them to Fantoft in Bergen in 1883. There, Gade rebuilt the church and named it Fantoft Stave Church. Gade used the Borgund Stave Church as the model for his reconstructed church, so it was not a true reconstruction of the old Fortun Stave Church after it was rebuilt. It was used as a museum and cultural site for over a century. On 6 June 1992, the centuries-old church was destroyed in an arson fire. Soon after, in 1997, a replica building was completed on the same site, but virtually all of the old parts from the original stave church in Fortun had been lost.

== Media gallery ==
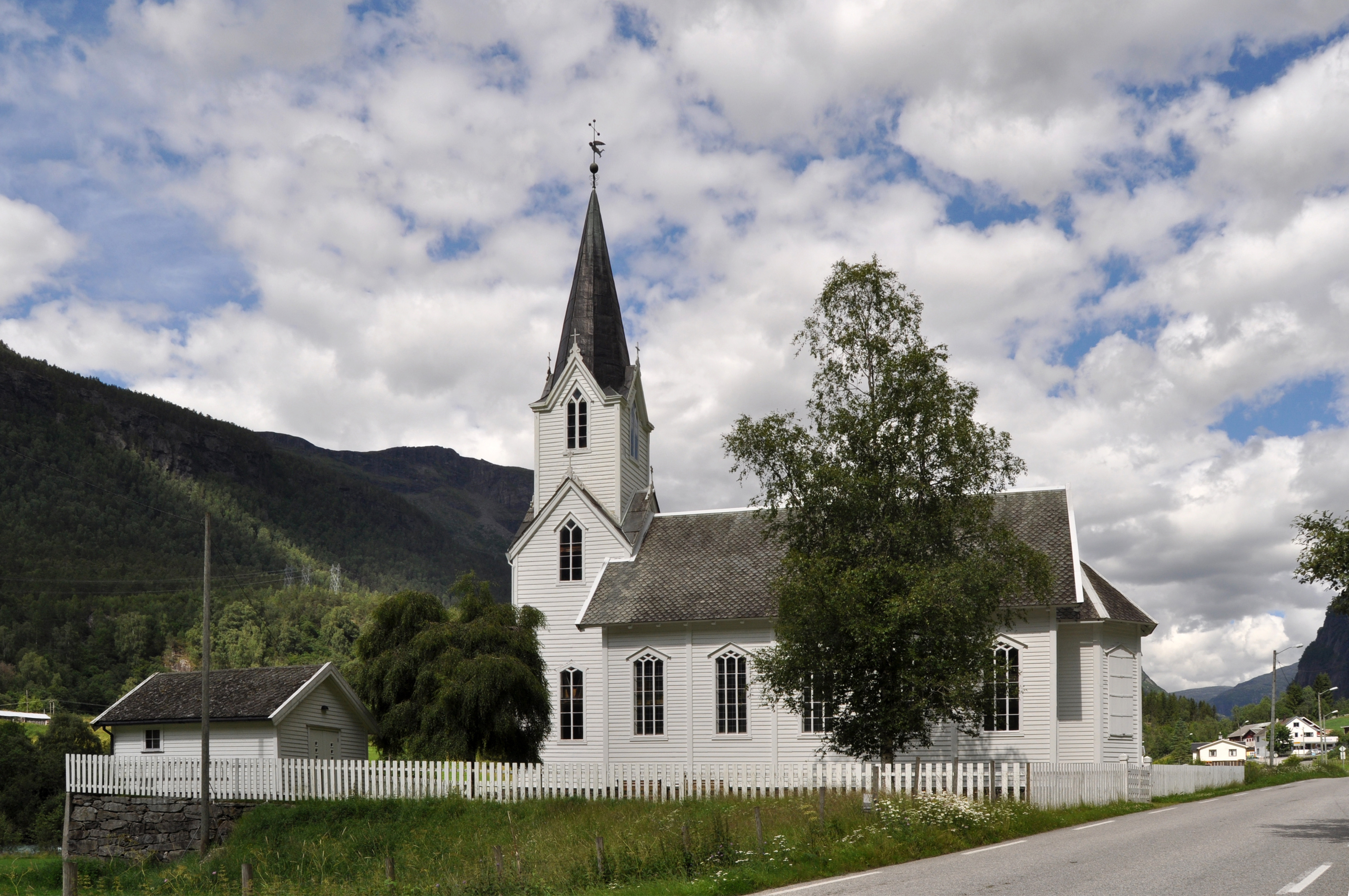
Exterior view

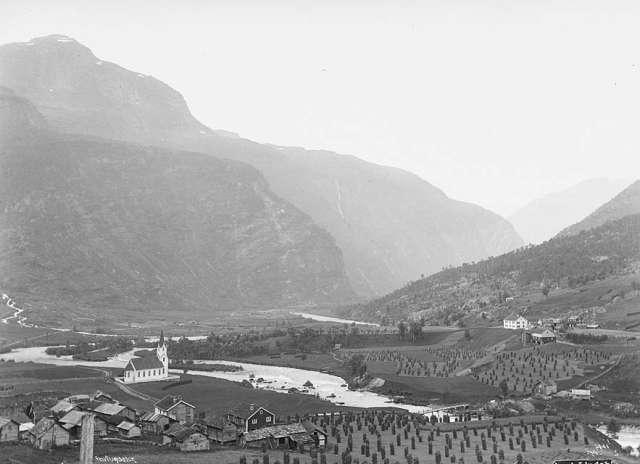
View of the church in the late 19th century

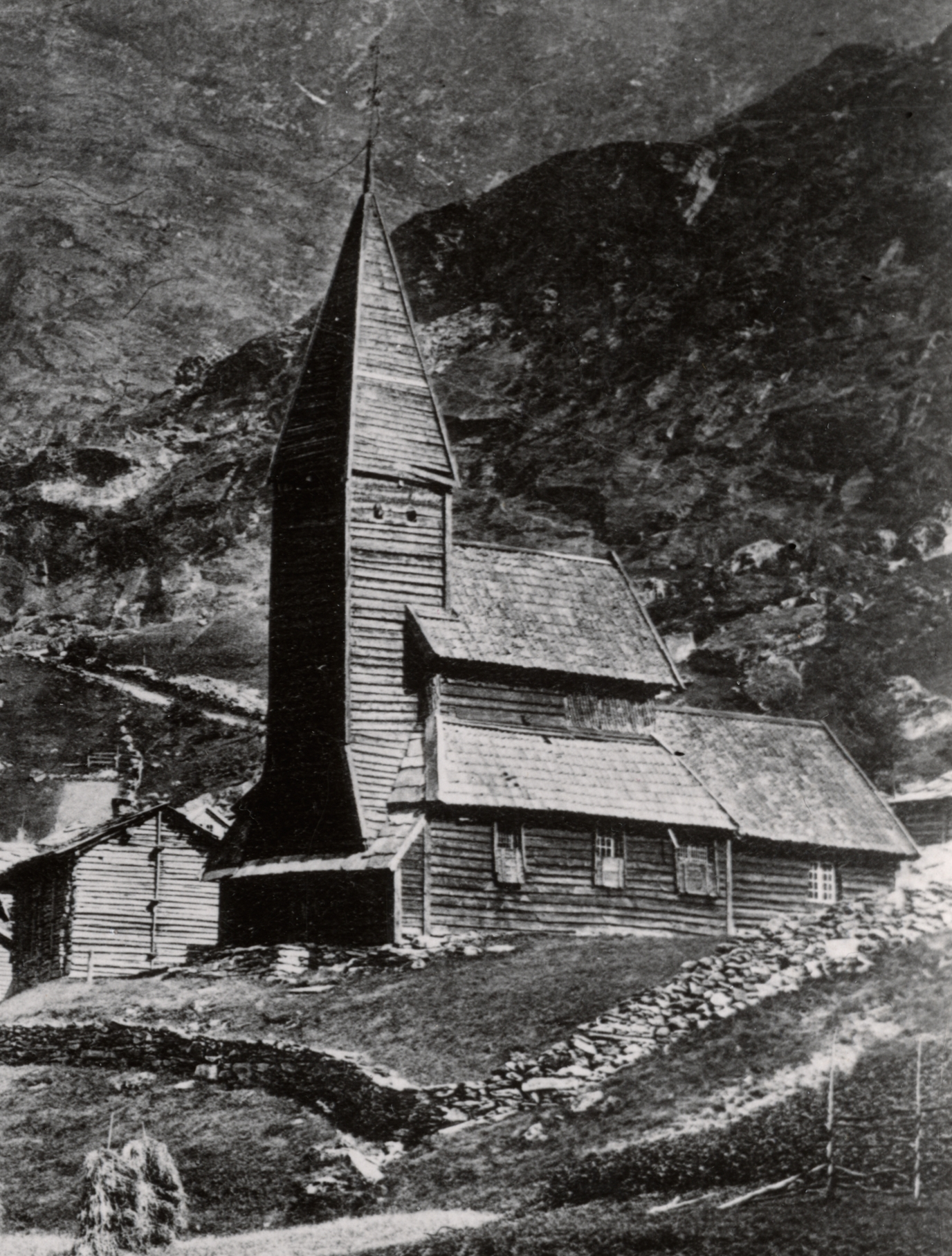
View of the old stave church before it was moved to Bergen

== See also ==
- List of churches in Bjørgvin
