= Baars =

Baars is a Dutch language patronymic or toponymic surname. Notable people with the surname include:

- Ab Baars (born 1955), Dutch jazz saxophonist and clarinettist
- Bernard Baars (born 1946), Dutch-born American neuroscientist
- Conrad Baars (1919–1981), Dutch psychiatrist
- Hans Baars-Lindner (1925–2014), German competitive sailor
- Henk Baars (born 1960), Dutch cyclist
- Herman Baars (1822–1896), Norwegian governmental official
- Jan Baars (1903–1989), Dutch fascist politician and World War II resistance member
- Jorina Baars (born 1988), Dutch kickboxer
- Lara Baars (born 1996), Dutch Paralympic athlete

== See also ==
- Baars, Overijssel, a village in Netherlands
