= Carlos Bertulani =

Brazilian and American physicist

Carlos A. Bertulani
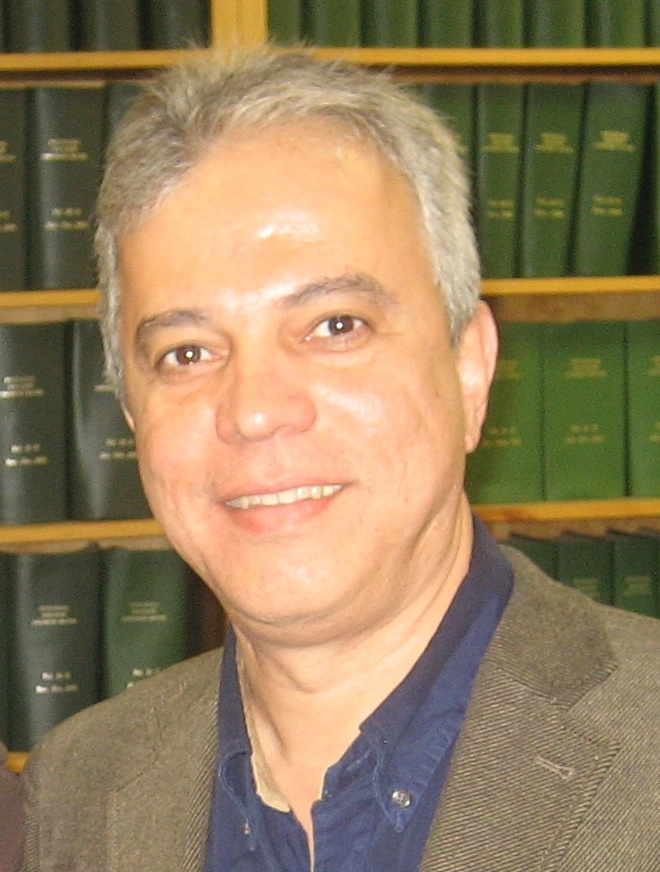
- Born: Vitória, Espírito Santo, Brazil
- Education: University of Bonn
- Known for: Electromagnetic processes with relativistic heavy ions, nuclei far from stability
- Awards: Brazilian National Merit Fellowship (CNPq); Deutscher Akademischer Austauschdienst Fellow; John Simon Guggenheim Fellow; Fellow of the American Physical Society
- Scientific career
- Fields: Physics
- Workplaces: Federal University of Rio de Janeiro; Michigan State University; Brookhaven National Laboratory; University of Arizona; Oak Ridge National Laboratory; Gesellschaft fuer Schwerionenforshung (GSI); Texas A&M University-Commerce.

Carlos A. Bertulani is a Brazilian and American theoretical physicist and professor at the department of physics of the Texas A&M University-Commerce. He graduated, PhD, at University of Bonn and works on nuclear physics and nuclear astrophysics. He was formerly a professor at the Federal University of Rio de Janeiro from 1980 to 2000.

== Research ==
Bertulani's thesis work on electromagnetic processes in relativistic heavy ion collisions is often taken as the standard reference for gamma-nucleus and gamma-gamma physics in collisions with heavy nuclei. Numerous processes related to lepton-pair (e.g., e^{+}e^{−}, or quark-antiquark) production, and to meson production in Peripheral nuclear collisions were first discussed and proposed in his thesis. The excitation of multiple giant resonances (i.e., a giant resonance on top of another) in nuclei was also a prediction of his thesis work. The excitation of multiple dipole resonances were verified in experiments at the Gesellschaft für Schwerionenforschung (GSI), Germany. The Coulomb dissociation method was another product of his earlier work as a doctoral student, in 1986. This method is now used in several nuclear accelerators worldwide to extract information on radiative capture processes in stars, which often cannot be measured directly.

His APS Fellowship citation is:

For leading the development of theories for electromagnetic processes in heavy-ion collisions, including many pioneering and successful predictions for reactions involving nuclei far from the stability line.

Bertulani works on the physics of nuclei far from the stability line, e.g. halo nuclei; he has contributed to pioneering theoretical articles on the subject, as far back as 1986, on the nature of the ^{11}Li nucleus. He has co-authored the first theoretical review of reactions with rare nuclear isotopes in 1993 and the first textbook in 2002.Physics of Radioactive Nuclear Beams. 2002. Bertulani has published textbooks on nuclear physics and nuclear astrophysics, and edited books of international conferences that he organized. He is often involved in popularizing science, e.g. a feature article on Physics Today, March 1994.

He was a recipient of the John Simon Guggenheim Memorial Foundation fellowship in 2000–2001, an APS Fellow in 2012 and the Fulbright Scholarship in 2014.

== Teaching ==
Bertulani has taught more than 75 courses at the undergraduate and graduate level at universities in Brazil, United States and Germany. He has advised PhD and MSc students and mentored undergraduate students. Bertulani was chair of the PhD program at the Federal University of Rio de Janeiro for 3 years. He participated and chaired committees on education and graduate student fellowships for the CNPq, Coordenadoria de Aperfeiçoamento de Pessoal de Nível Superior, National Science Foundation, and chaired (2015–2016) of the Committee of Education for the American Physical Society.

== Publications ==
=== Selected scientific publications ===
- Google Scholar
- Carlos A. Bertulani
- Electromagnetic Processes in Relativistic Heavy Ion Collisions, C.A.Bertulani and G.Baur, Phys. Reports 163 (1988) 29.
- Coulomb Dissociation as a Source of Information on Radioactive Capture Processes of Astrophysical Interest, G.Baur, C.A.Bertulani and H.Rebel, Nucl. Phys. A458 (1986) 188.
- The Structure and Reactions of Neutron-Rich Nuclei, C.A. Bertulani, L.F. Canto and M.S. Hussein, Physics Reports 226 (1993) 281.
- Relativistic Heavy Ion Physics without Nuclear Contact, C.A. Bertulani and G. Baur, Physics Today, March 1994, p. 22.
- Microscopic studies of the double giant resonance, C.A. Bertulani and V. Ponomarev, Phys. Reports 321 (1999) 139.
- Physics of ultraperipheral relativistic nuclear collisions, C.A. Bertulani, S. Klein and J. Nystrand, Annu. Rev. Nuc. Part. Sci. 55 (2005) 271.
- Nuclear Astrophysics with Radioactive Beams, C.A. Bertulani and A. Gade, Physics Reports 485, 195 (2010).
- Indirect methods in nuclear astrophysics with relativistic radioactive beams, Thomas Aumann and Carlos A. Bertulani, Progress in Particle and Nuclear Physics 112, 103753 (2020).

=== Textbooks ===
- Bertulani, C.; Hussein, M.S.; Muenzenberg, G. (2002). Physics of Radioactive Beams. Nova Science Publishers, NY. ISBN 1590331419. ISBN 1-59033-141-9
- Bertulani, C.; Schechter, H. (2002). Introduction to Nuclear Physics. Nova Science Publishers, NY. ISBN 1-59033-358-6
- Bertulani, C.; Danielewicz, P. (2021). Introduction to Nuclear Reactions. CRC Press, 2nd edition (March 24, 2021), London. ISBN 978-0367353629
- Bertulani, C. (2007). Nuclear Physics in a Nutshell. Princeton University Press, NJ. ISBN 9780691125053. ISBN 9781400839322
- Bertulani, C. (2013). Nuclei in the Cosmos. World Scientific. doi:10.1142/8573. ISBN 978-9814417662. ISBN 978-9814417662
