= Herman Gerhard Gade =

Norwegian physician (1870–1953)

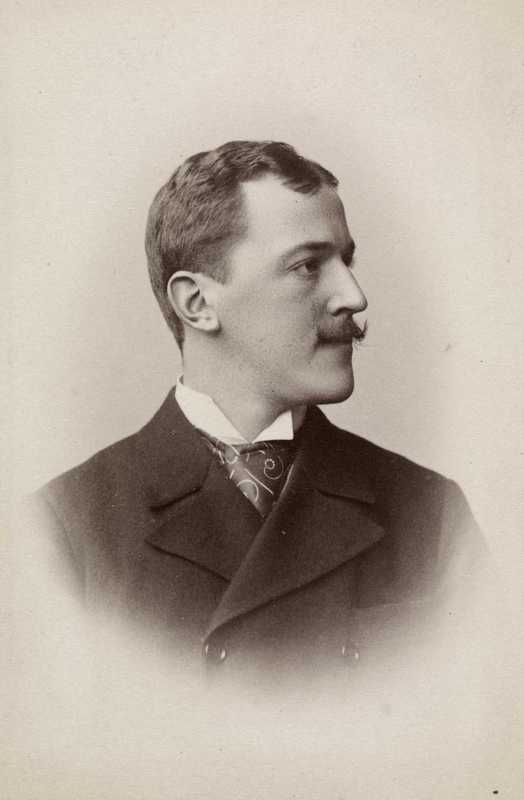
Herman Gerhard Gade in 1893

Herman Gerhard Gade (22 March 1870 – 8 February 1953) was a Norwegian physician, known for his work to fight tuberculosis.

He was born in Bergen as the son of businessperson Fredrik Georg Gade (1830–1905) and his wife Ingeborg Wallem (1830–1902). In June 1899 he married Alvide C. Pedersen from Stavanger. He was a brother of Fredrik Georg Gade, Jr, a brother-in-law of Anders Lorange, a first cousin of Fredrik Herman Gade, John Allyne Gade and Fredrik Barbe Wallem and a nephew of Fredrik Meltzer Wallem.

He finished his secondary education at Bergen Cathedral School in 1888, enrolled in medicine studies and took the cand.med. degree in 1895. He is mainly known for his work at the tuberculosis hospital in Hagavik. He was hired at Hagavik in 1898, moved there in 1902 and later became chief physician and hospital director. In 1908 he represented Norway at the Sixth International Congress on Tuberculosis held in Washington, DC.
