= 1170s in architecture =

- 1160s
- 1170s in architecture
- 1180s
Other topics in 1170s:
- Art

== Buildings and structures ==
=== Buildings ===
- about 1170 – Airavatesvara Temple completed in Darasuram, India (Chola Empire).
- about 1170 – Galilee Chapel added to Durham Cathedral.
- about 1170–1180 – Construction of St. Faith's Church, Sélestat, Alsace.
- 1170 – San Nicola Bell Tower, Pisa, Italy.
- 1171 – Romanesque building of the Tournai Cathedral, Hainaut consecrated.
- 1171 – Rebuilding of Canterbury Cathedral began under William of Sens.
- 1171 – Pont d'Avignon begun.
- about 1171 – Castle of Almourol in the Tagus, Portugal, built.
- 1172 – Nur Al-Din Mosque completed in Hama, Syria.
- 1172 – Newcastle Castle in Northern England is rebuilt in stone.
- 1172 – Ikorta church built in Georgia.
- 1173 – Bell Tower of the Basilica di San Zeno completed in Verona, Italy.
- 1173 – Approximate traditional completion date of Great Mosque of al-Nuri (Mosul).
- 1173–1178 – First stage of work on campanile of Pisa cathedral in Italy, which becomes the Leaning Tower of Pisa.
- 1174 – Monreale Cathedral begun.
- 1175 – Sainte-Trinité Abbey Church in Lessay begun.
- 1175 – Soissons Cathedral begun.
- 1175–1176 – Wells Cathedral begun.
- 1177 – The Piazza San Marco in Venice assumes its current shape.
- 1177 – Maria Laach Abbey in the Holy Roman Empire completed.
- Basilica Sant'Ambrogio, Milan begun.
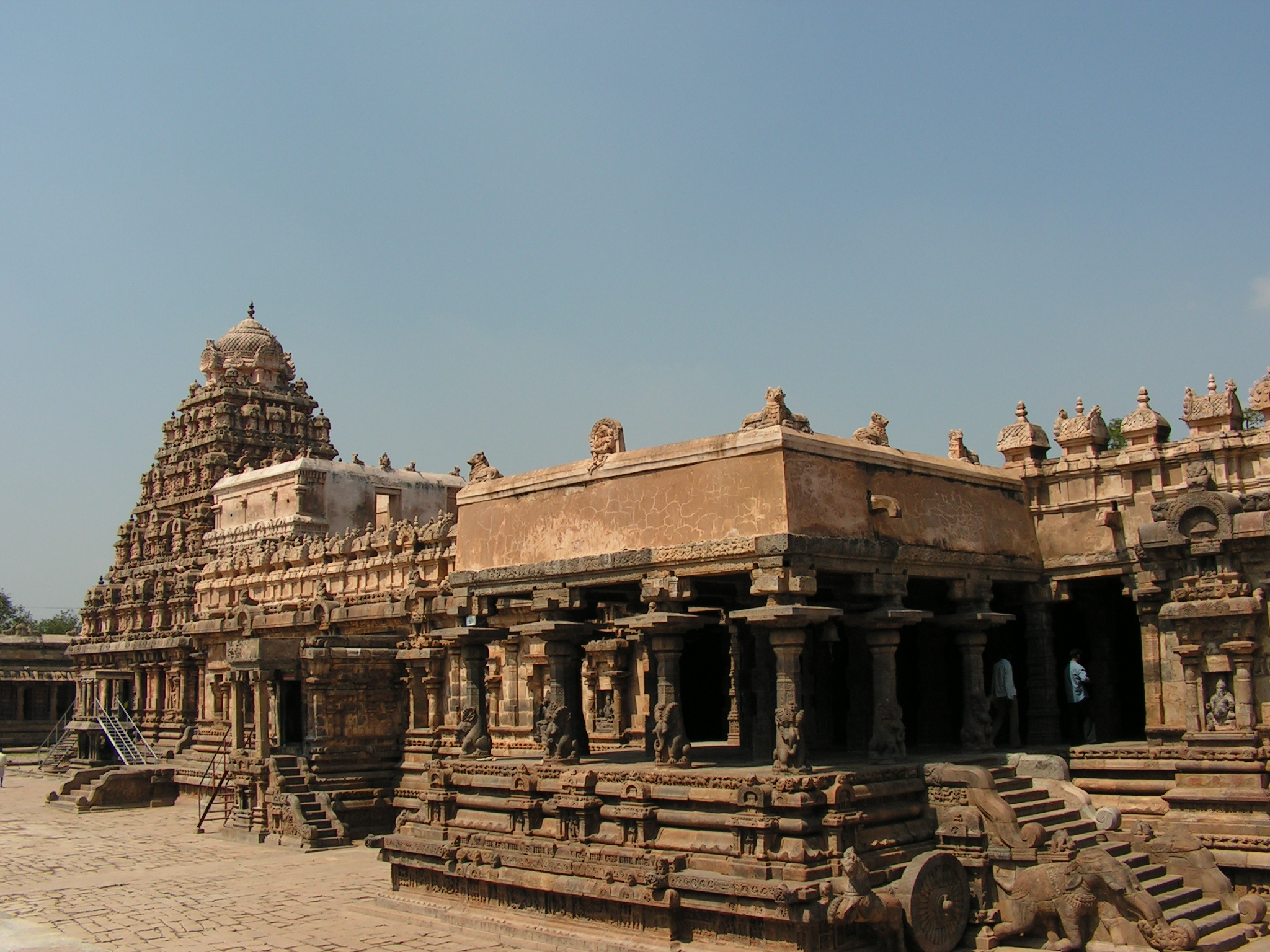
Airavatesvara Temple (1170)

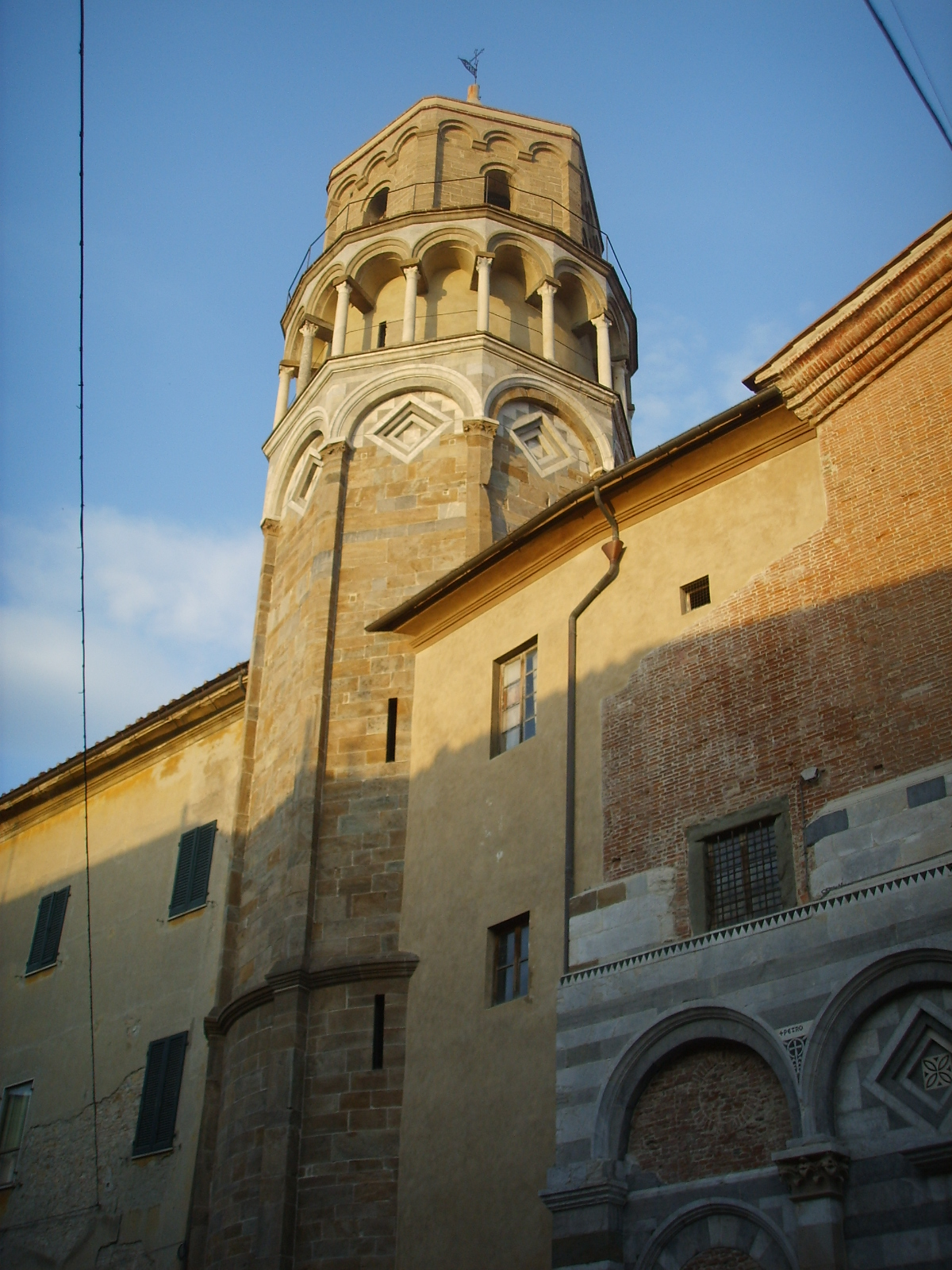
San Nicola Bell Tower, Pisa (1170)

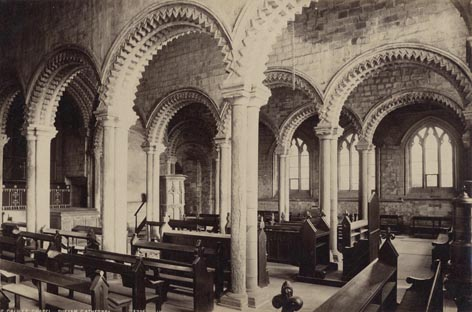
Durham Cathedral Galilee Chapel (1170)

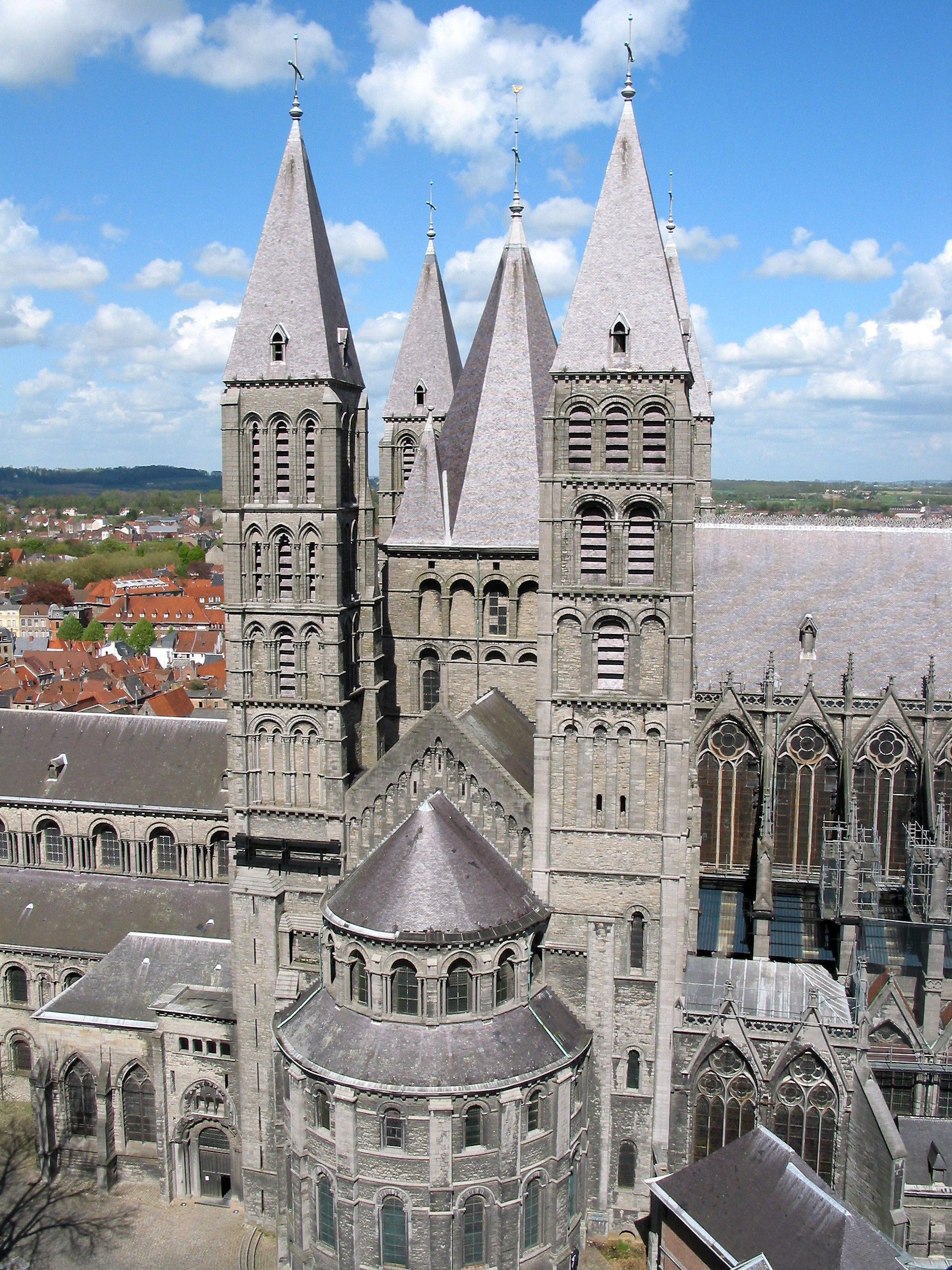
Tournai Cathedral (1171)

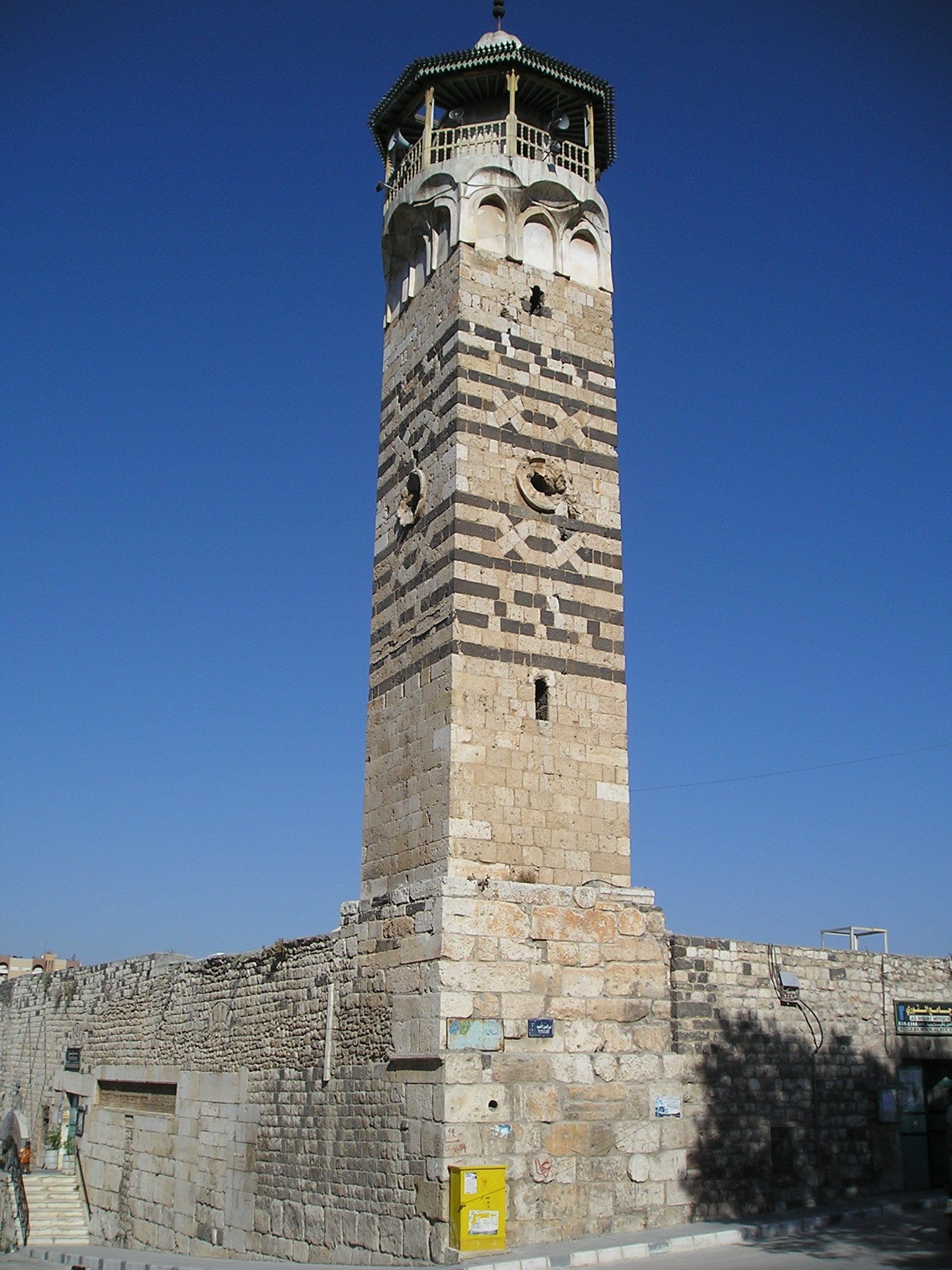
Nur Al-Din Mosque, Hama (1172)

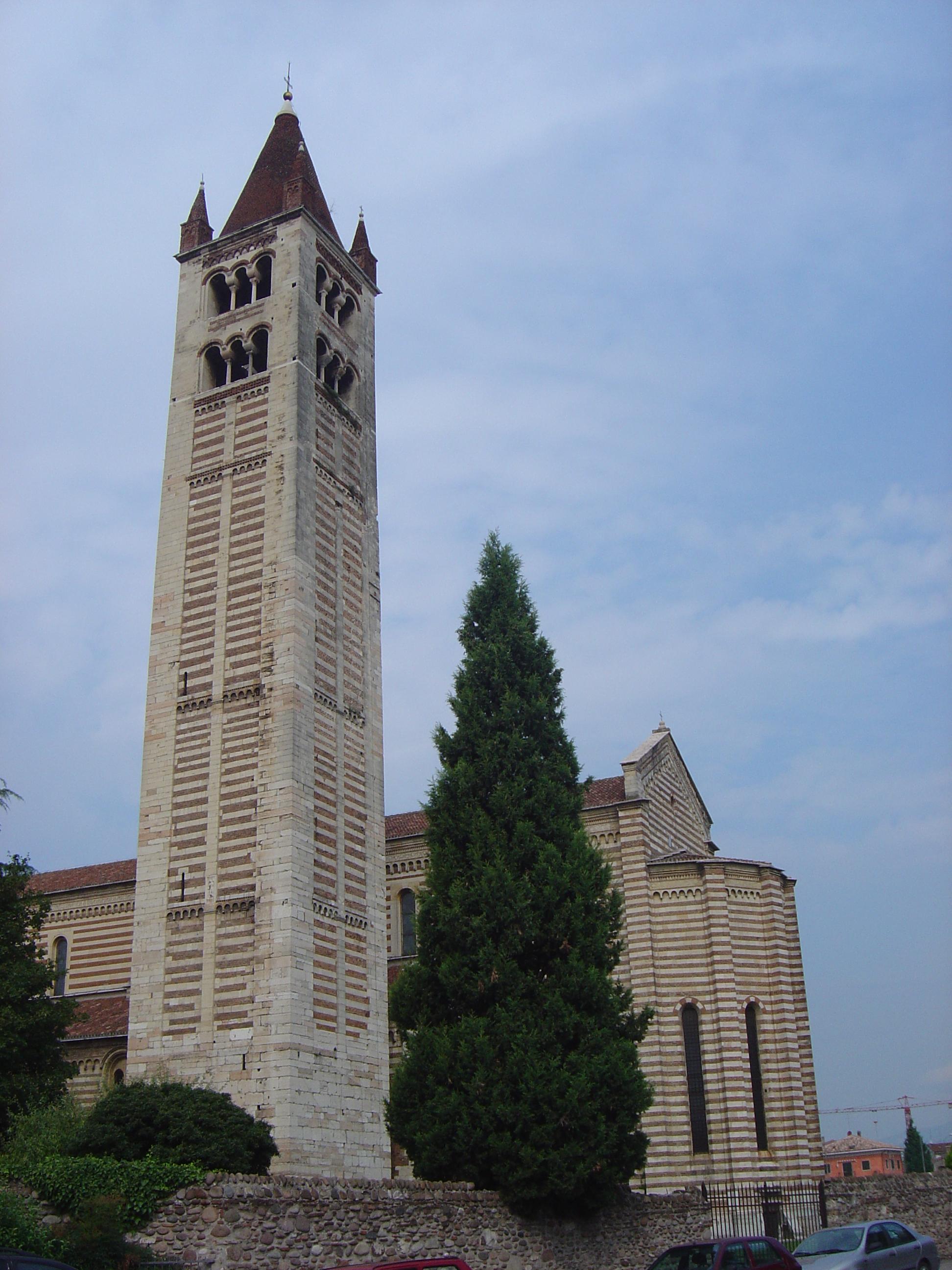
San Zeno Bell Tower, Verona (1173)

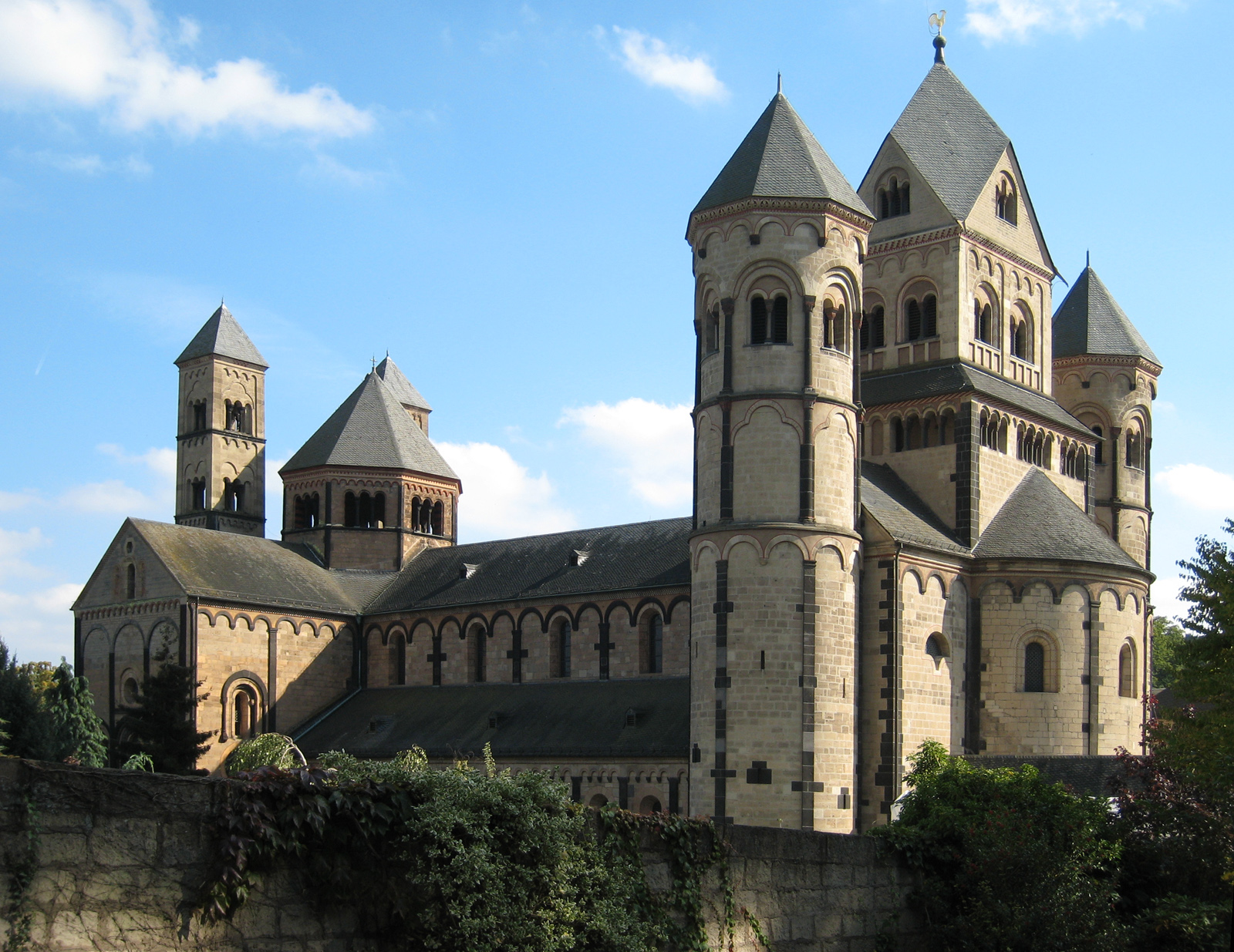
Maria Laach Abbey (1177)
