= Fantoft Stave Church =

Norwegian stave church

Coordinates: 60°20′21″N 5°21′12″E

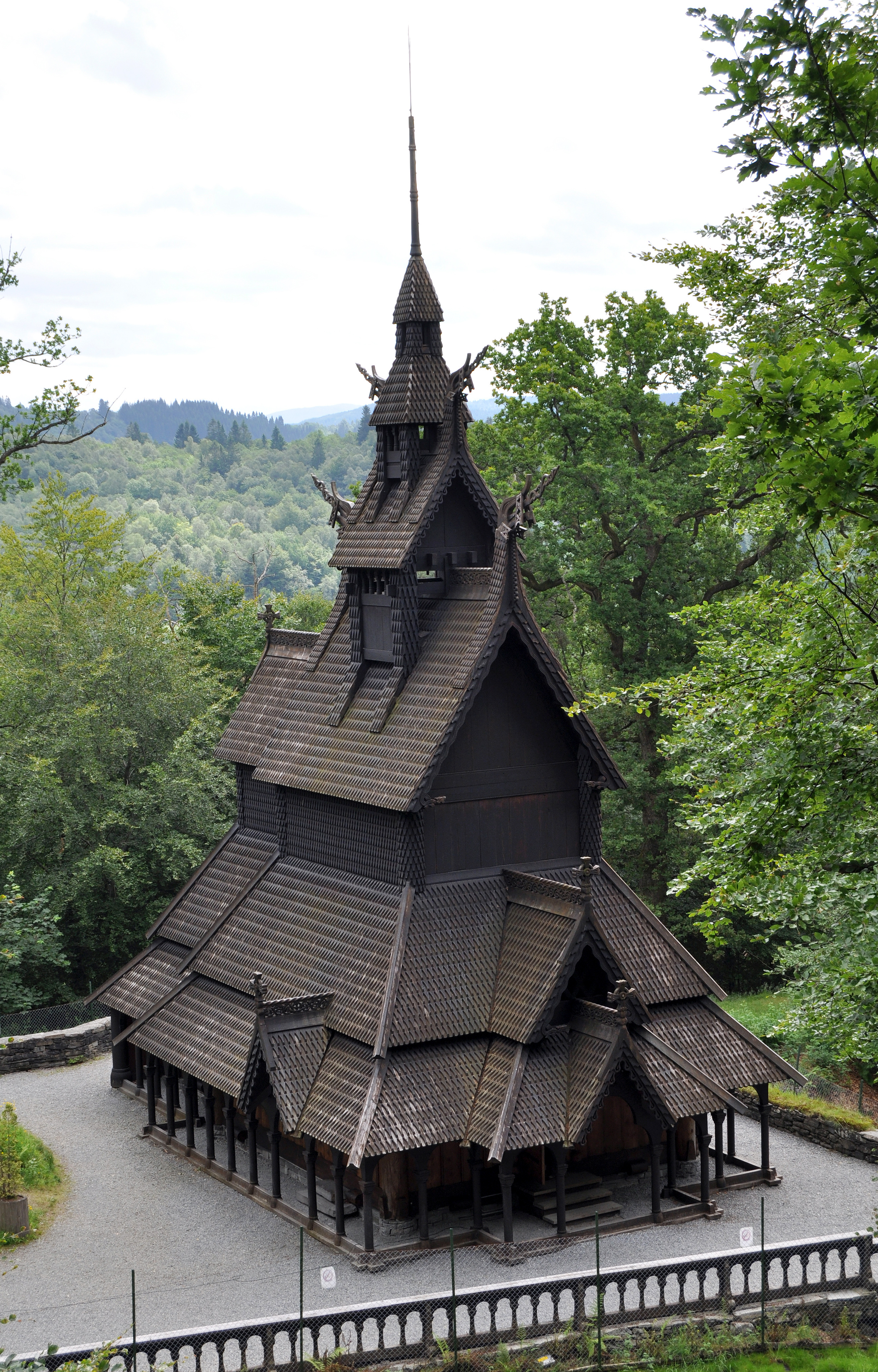
Fantoft Stave Church

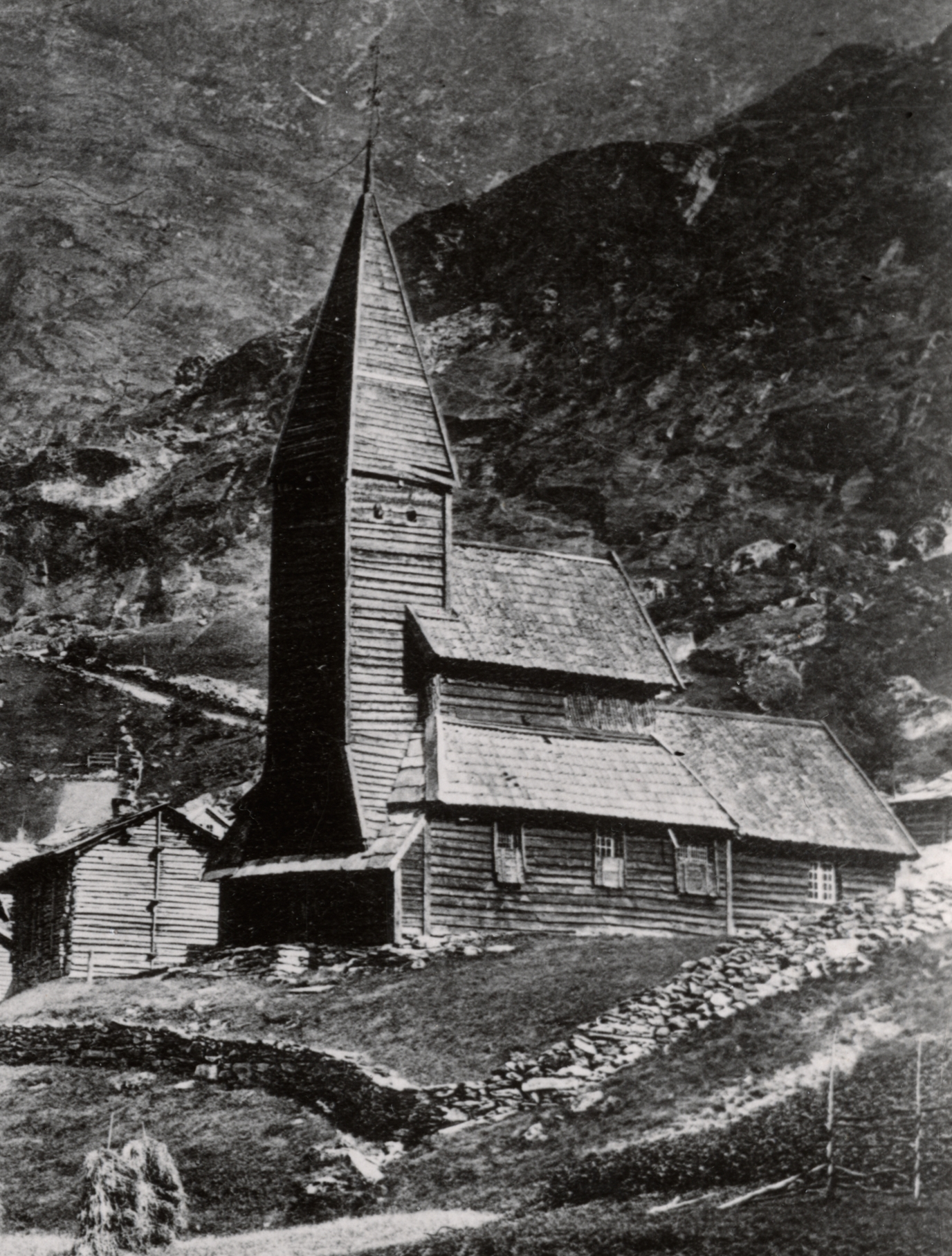
1873 photo of the Fantoft Stave Church before it was moved to Bergen

Fantoft Stave Church (Norwegian: Fantoft stavkirke; Nynorsk: Fantoft stavkyrkje) is a reconstructed stave church in Bergen Municipality in Vestland county, Norway. The church is located in the Fana borough of the city of Bergen.

== History ==
The church was originally built around the year 1150 at Fortun in Sogn, a village near the inner or eastern end of Sognefjord. In 1879, the new Fortun Church (Fortun kyrkje) was constructed as a replacement for the medieval stave church. Fantoft Stave Church was threatened with demolition, as were hundreds of other stave churches in Norway. Fantoft Stave Church was bought by consul Fredrik Georg Gade and saved by moving it in pieces to Fana near Bergen in 1883. Outside the church stands a stone cross from Tjora in Sola Municipality.

On 6 June 1992, the church was destroyed by arson; the first in a string of church burnings by members of the early Norwegian black metal scene. At first, the fire was thought to have been caused by lightning or an electrical failure. In 1994, Varg Vikernes of the one-man band Burzum was found guilty of burning Old Åsane Church and Storetveit Church in Bergen Municipality, Skjold Church in Vindafjord Municipality, and Holmenkollen Chapel in Oslo Municipality. He was also charged with the burning of Fantoft Stave Church, although the jurors voted not guilty. The judges called this an error but did not overturn the decision. Reconstruction of the church began soon after the fire, taking six years to complete. Since 1997, the church has been surrounded by a security fence.

A photograph of the church's burnt shell appeared on the cover of the 1993 Burzum EP Aske (Norwegian for "ashes").

== Gallery ==
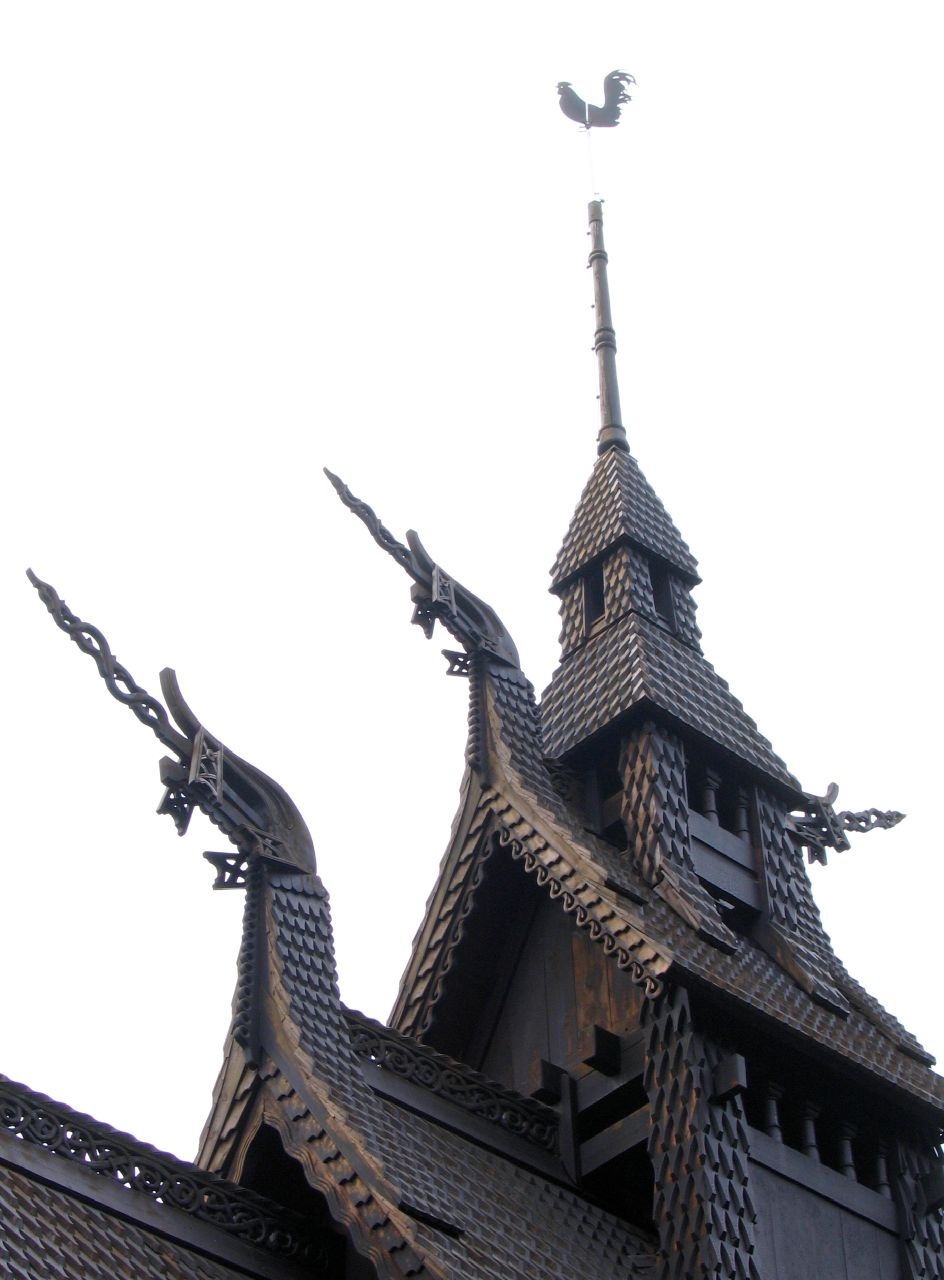
Details of church's roof

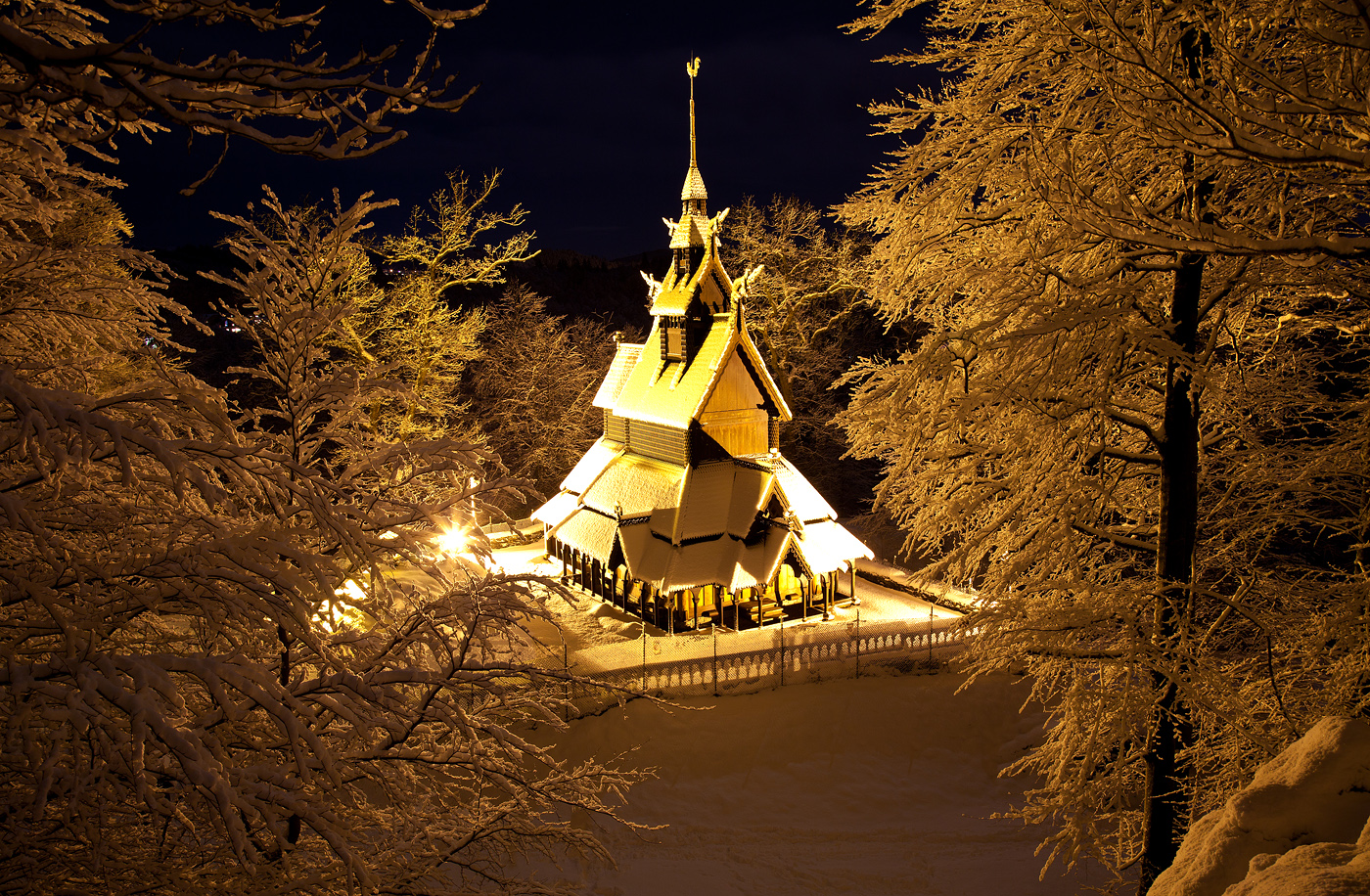
Fantoft Stave Church

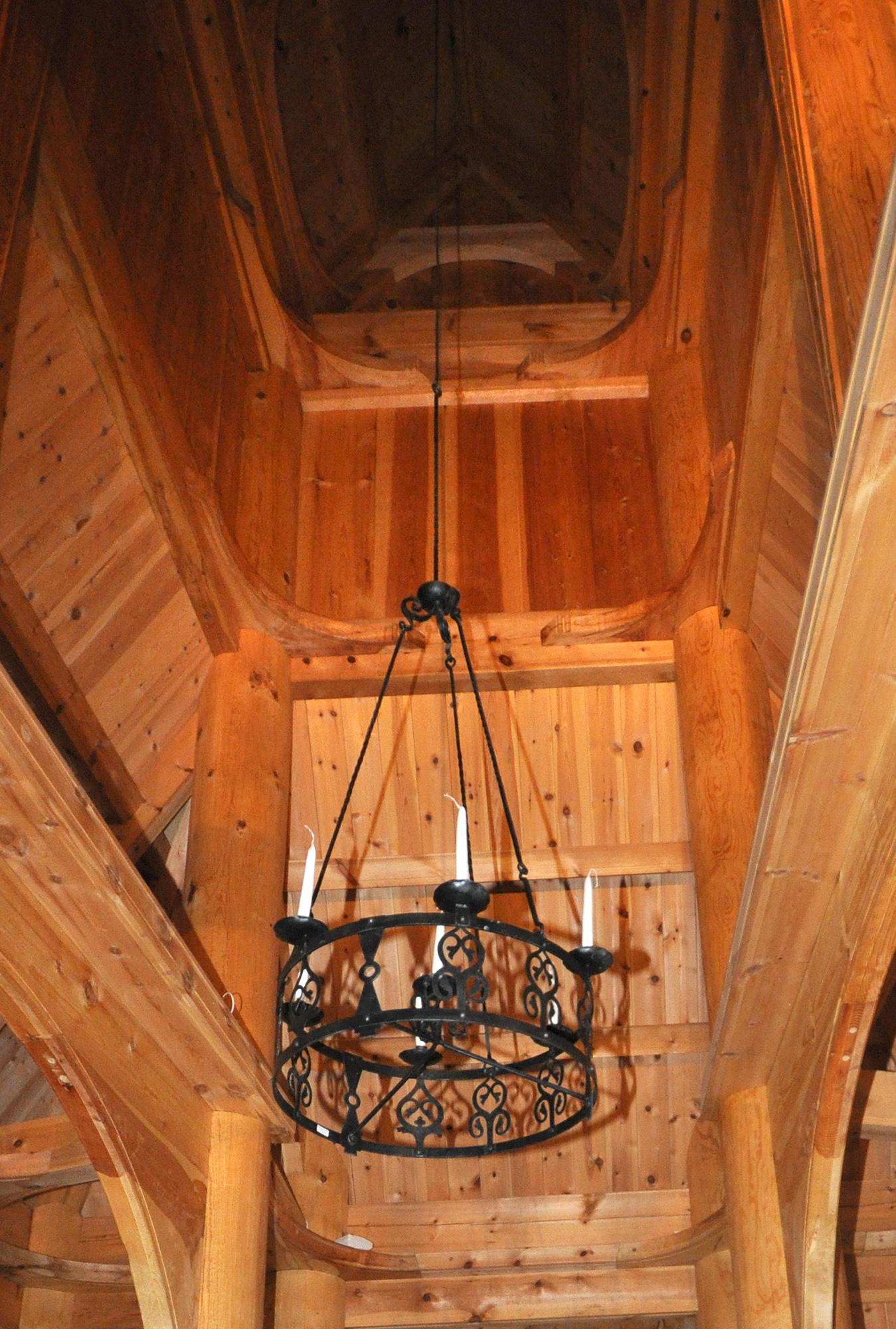
Fantoft Stave Church chandelier

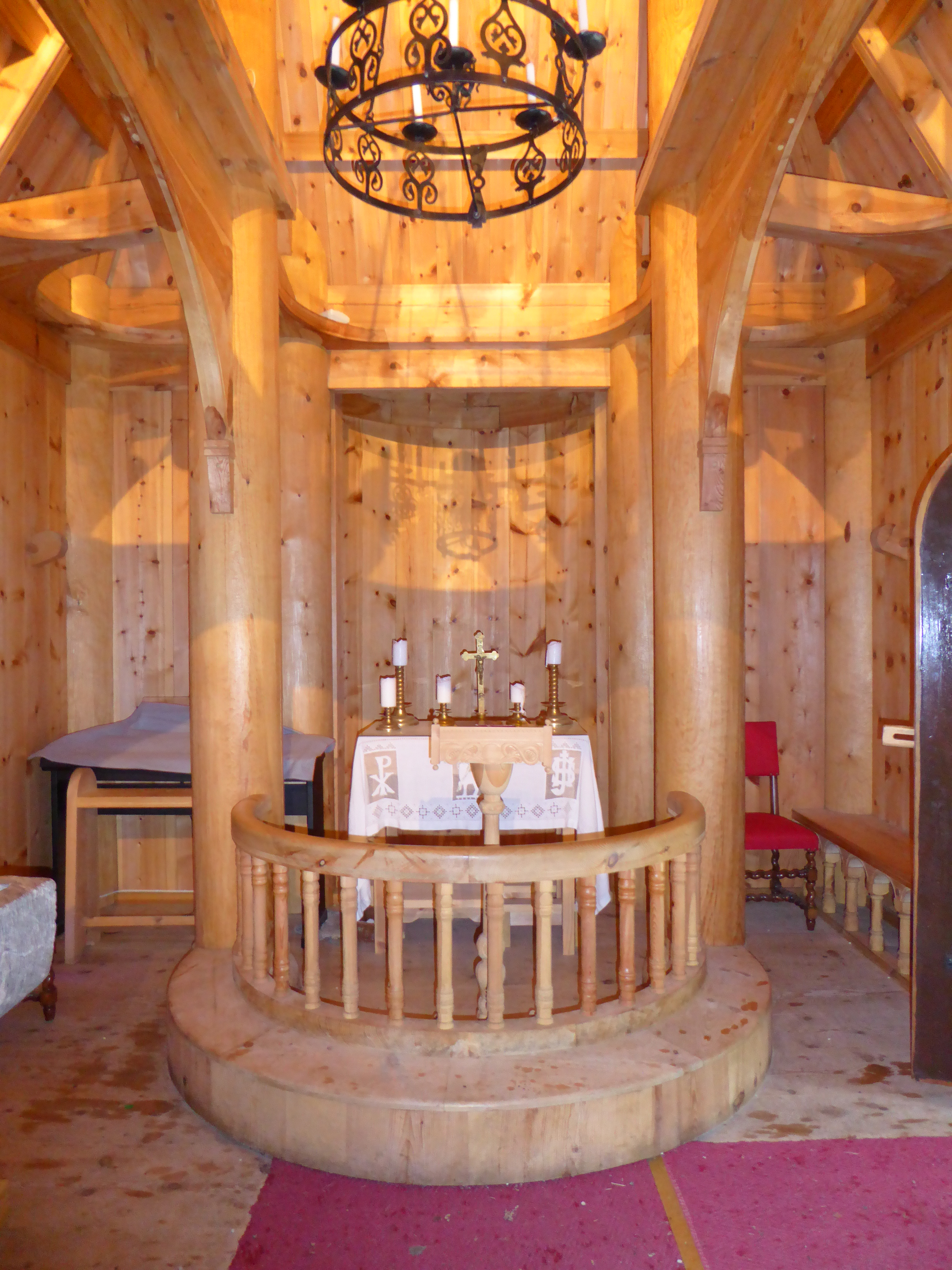
Fantoft Stave Church chancel

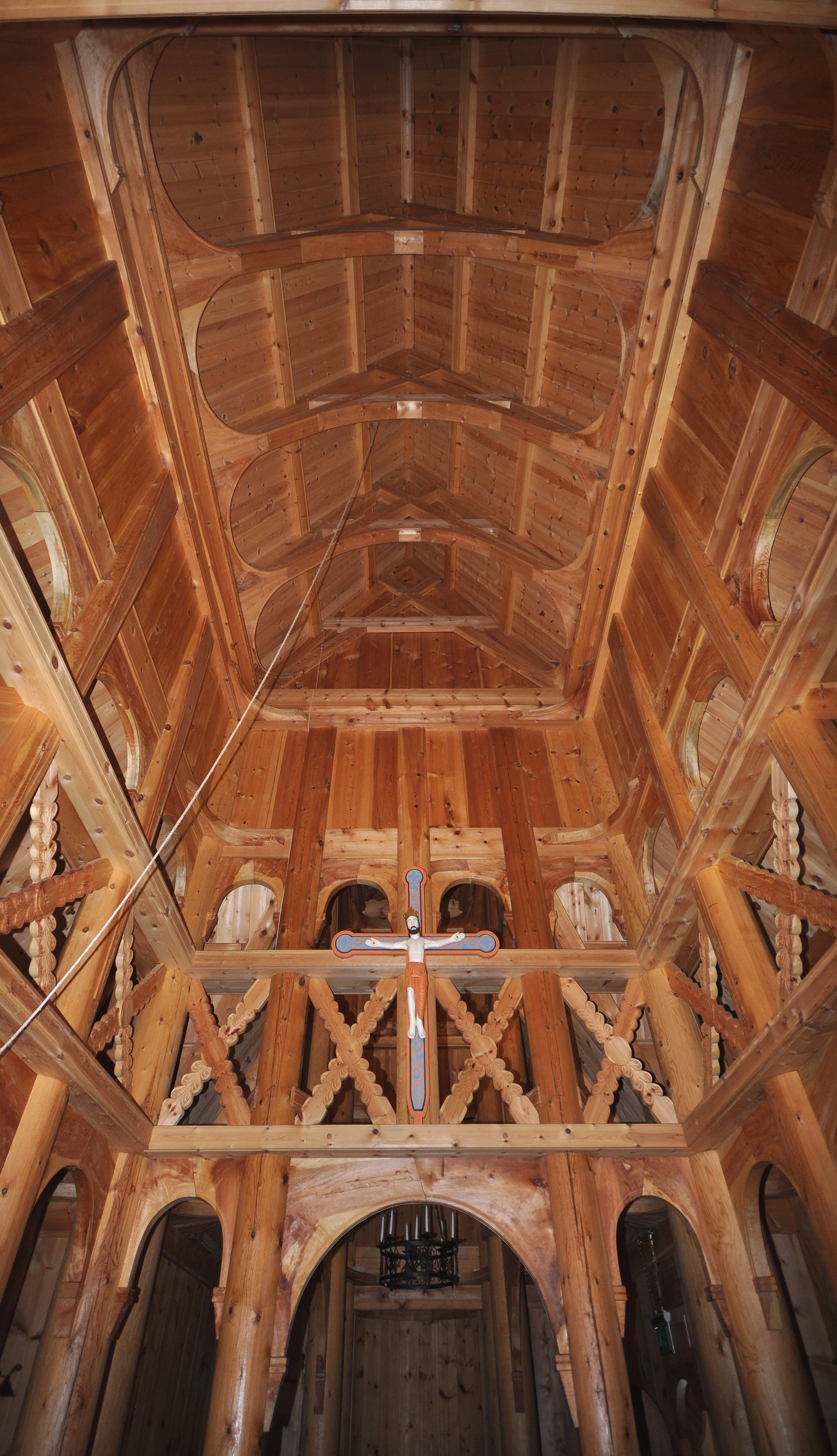
Fantoft Stave Church rafters and posts

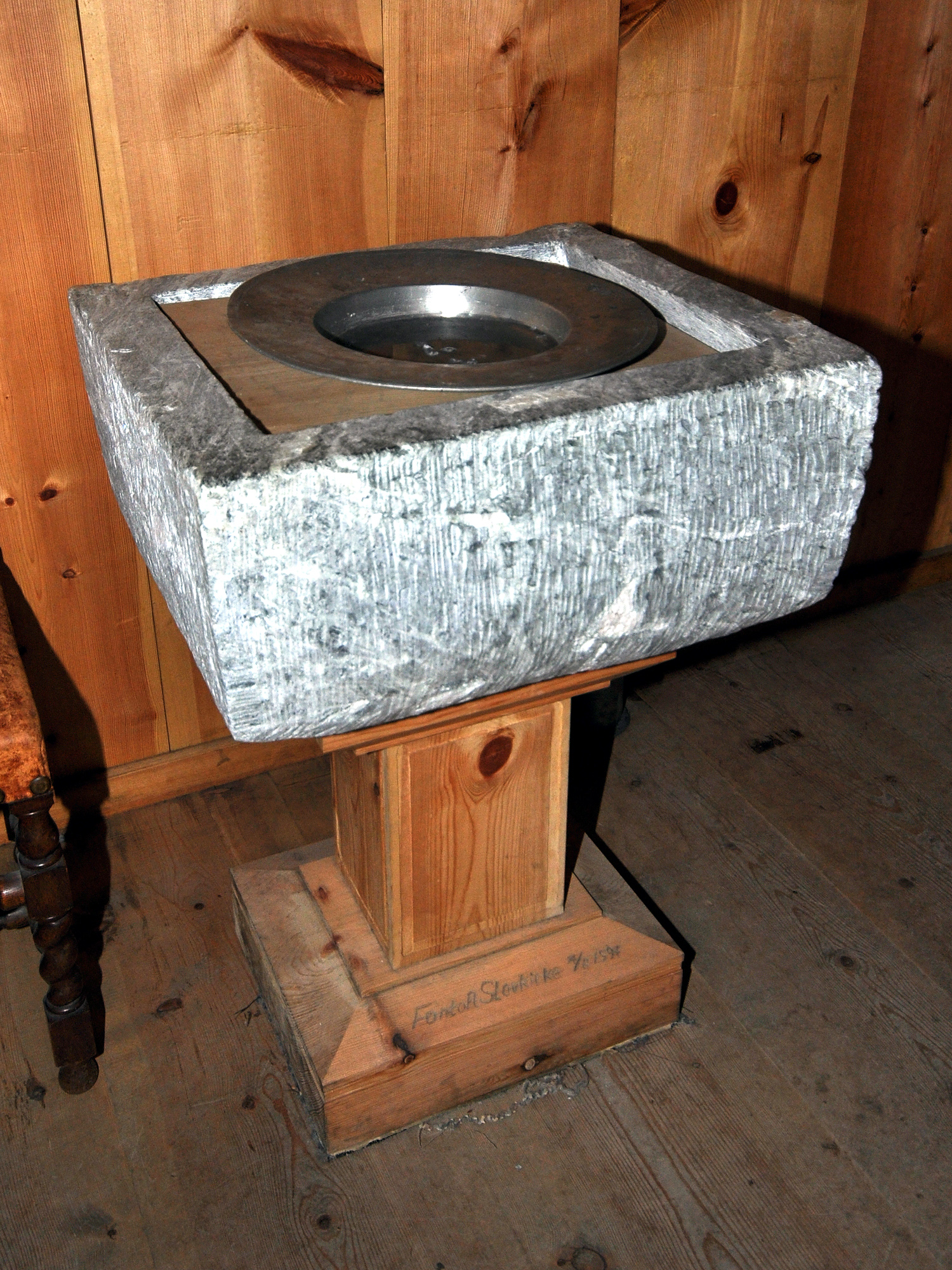
Fantoft Stave Church baptistery

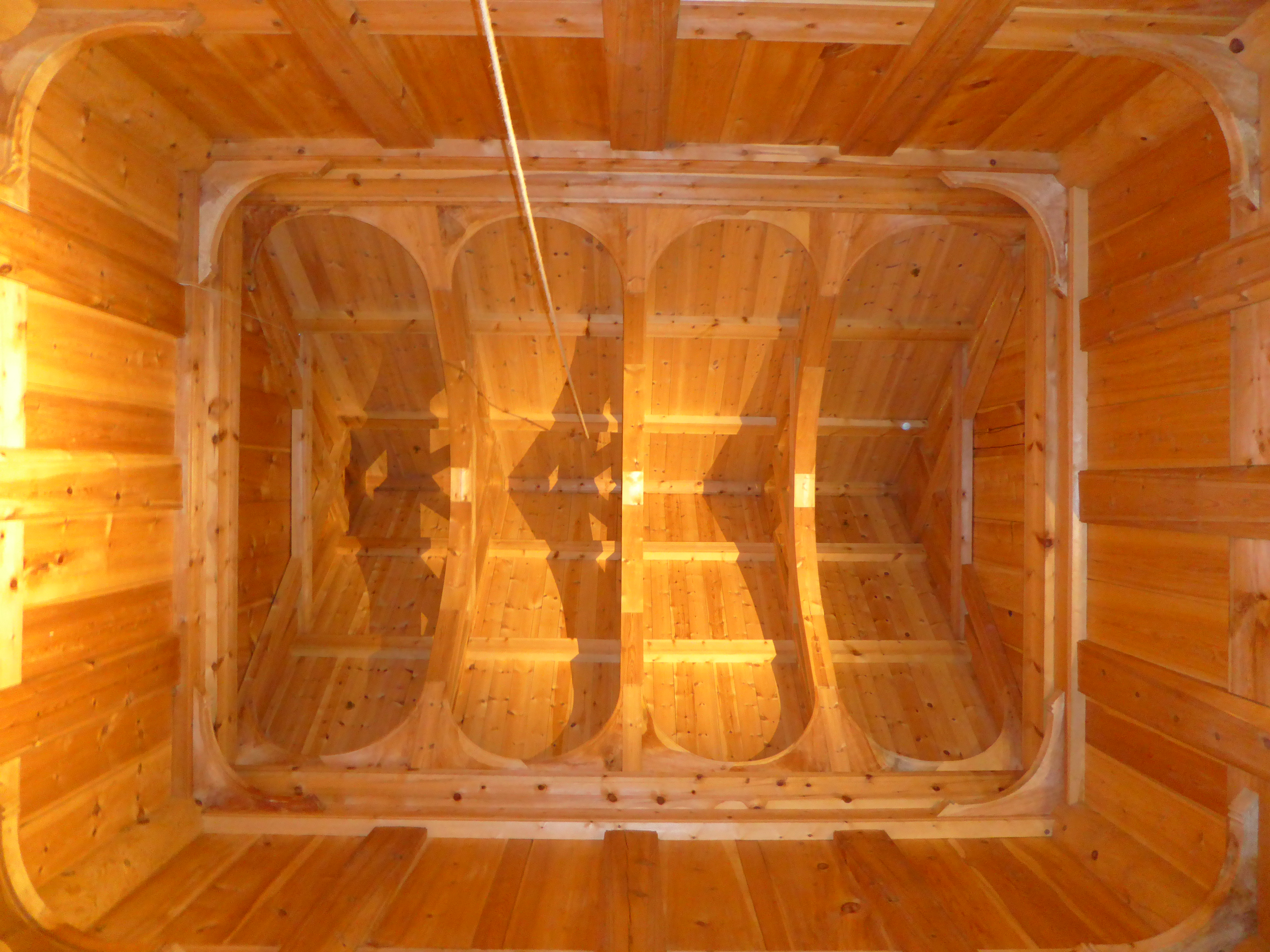
Fantoft Stave Church ceiling

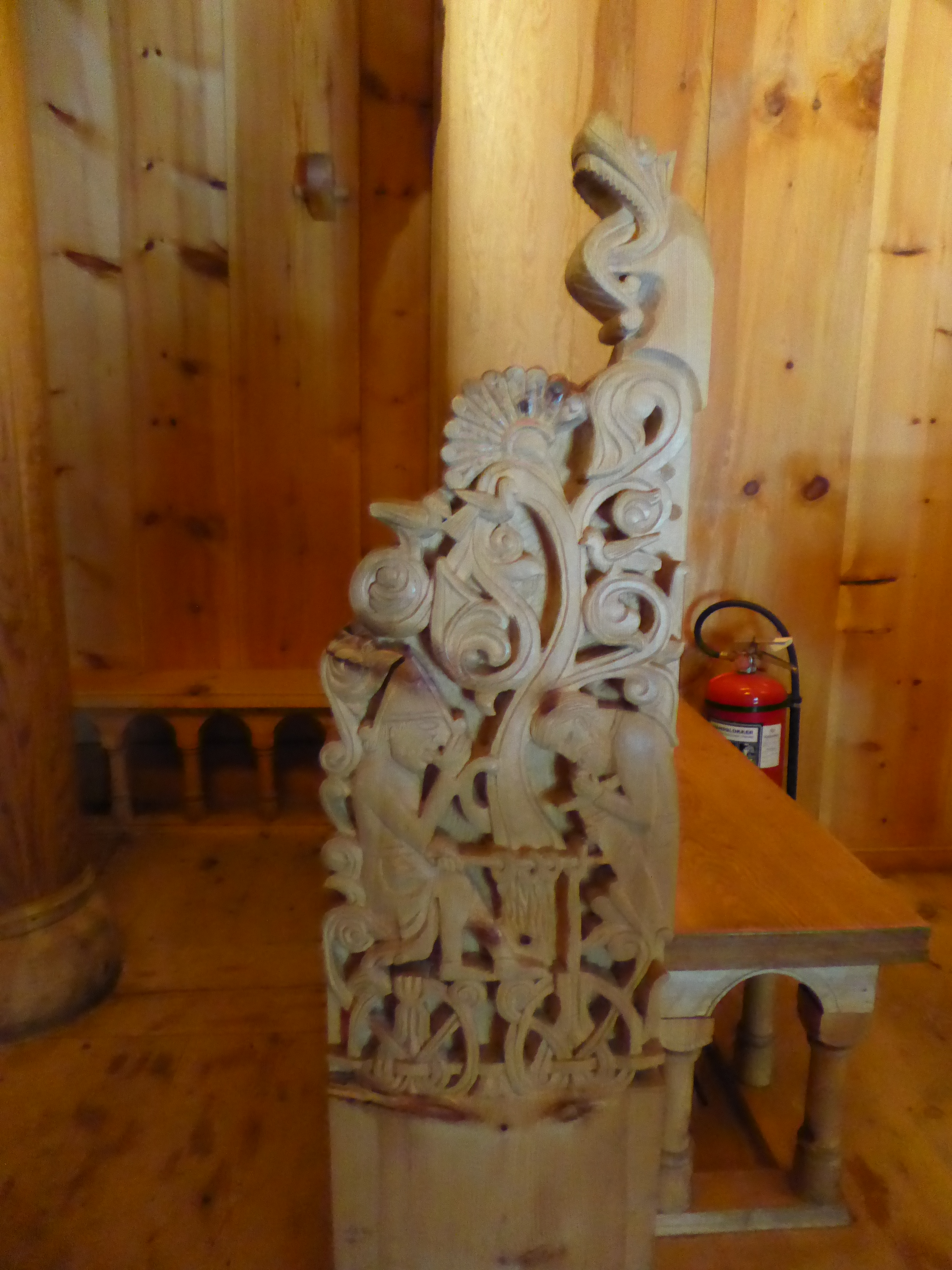
Fantoft Stave Church decorative art

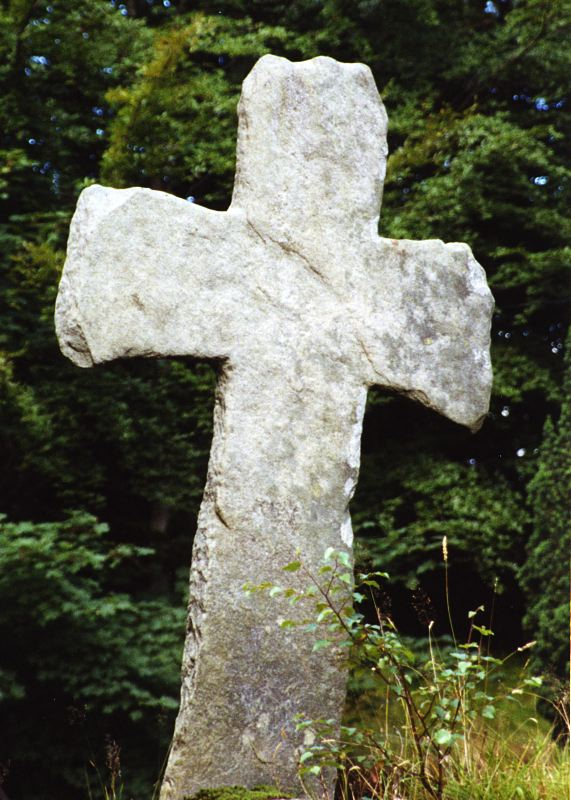
Stone cross outside Fantoft Stave Church

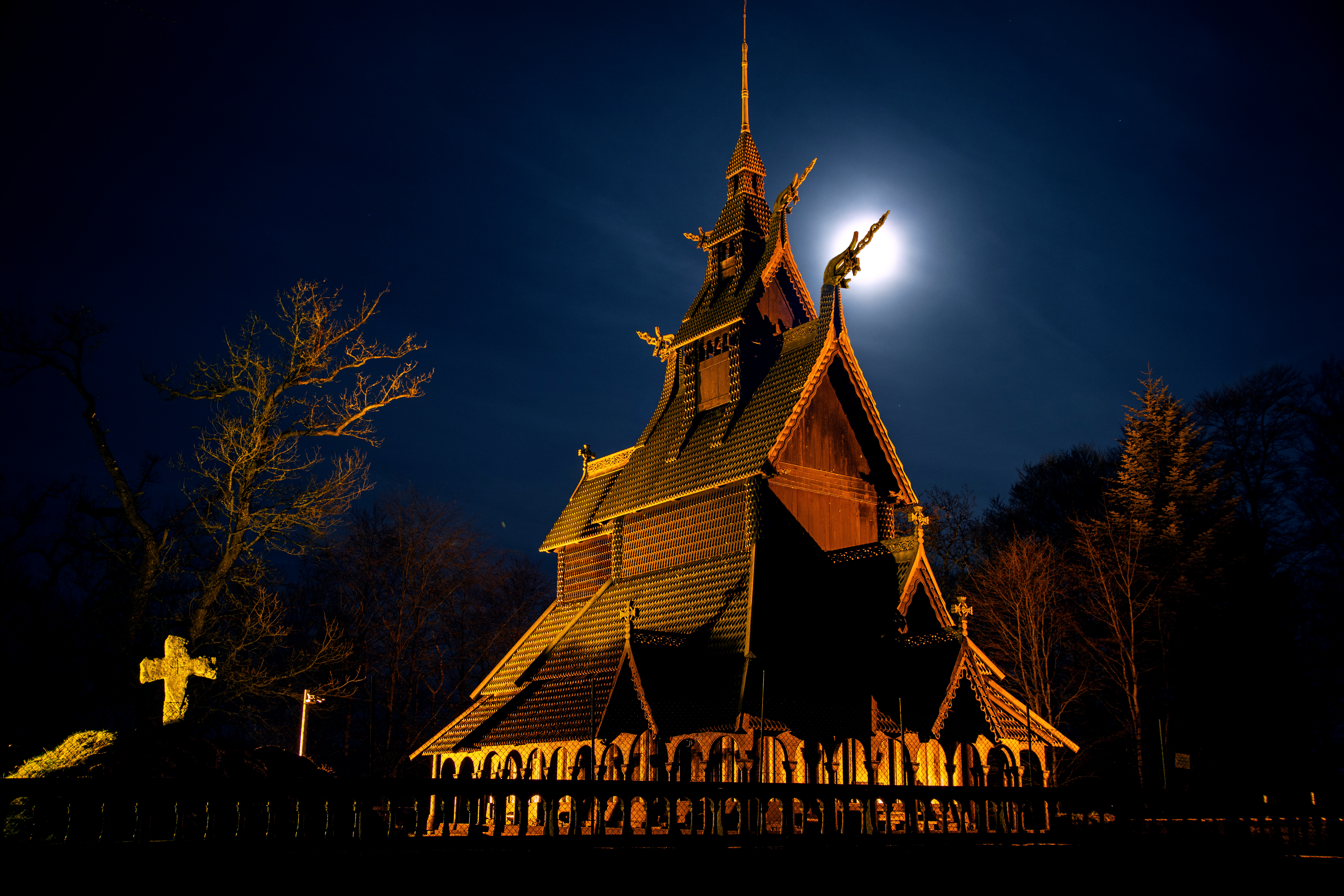
Fantoft Stave Church at night

== See also ==
- Until the Light Takes Us, documentary film that includes a clip on the arson
