= 1160s in architecture =

- 1150s
- 1160s in architecture
- 1170s

Architecture timeline

== Buildings and structures ==
=== Buildings ===
- About 1160 – Rebuilding of Notre-Dame of Laon begun.
- 1160
  - Al-Salih Tala'i Mosque built in Cairo, Fatimid Caliphate.
  - Rebuilding of Caen Cathedral begun.
  - Notley Abbey is founded and the Augustinian Monastery built.
- 1162 – Coimbra Cathedral begun.
- 1163
  - Thousand Pillar Temple of Warangal built in the Kakatiya Empire.
  - Construction of Notre Dame in Paris begun.
- 1164 – Golden Gate (Vladimir) completed.
- 1165
  - Liuhe Pagoda of Hangzhou, China rebuilt.
  - Dhammayangyi Temple built in Bagan, Pagan Kingdom.
- 1167
  - Nore Stave Church, Norway, built.
  - Earliest likely date for construction of building much later known as Marlipins Museum in Shoreham-by-Sea, England, commencing.
- 1168
  - Uvdal Stave Church, Norway, built.
  - Jiangnan Examination Hall, Nanjing, China, built.
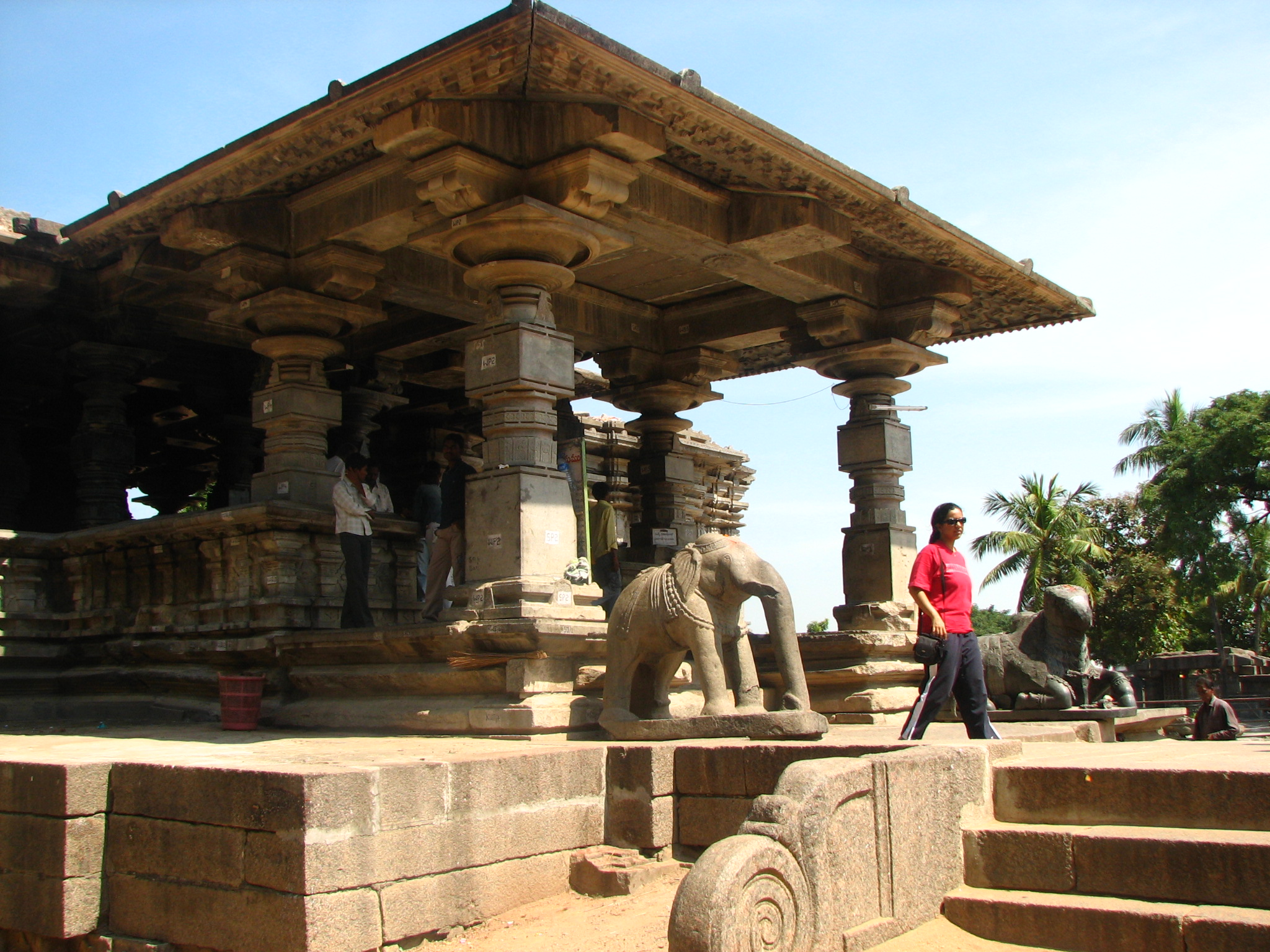
Thousand Pillar Temple, Warangal (1163)

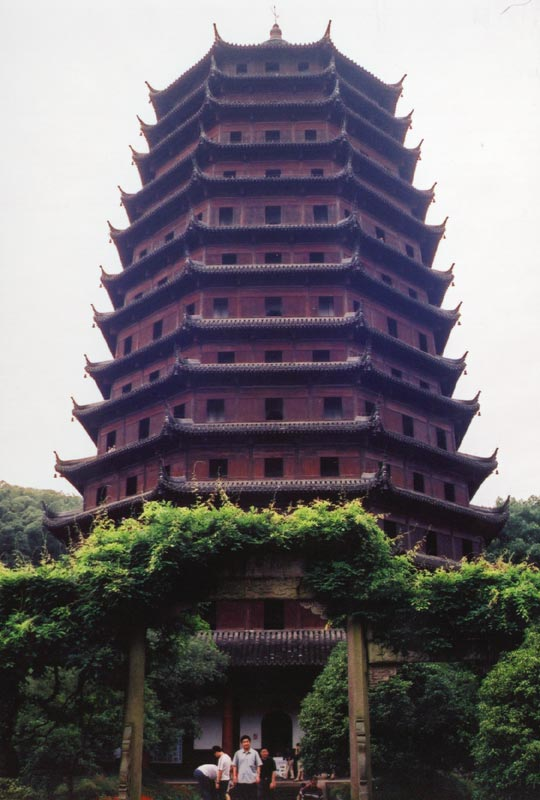
Liuhe Pagoda, Hangzhou (1165)

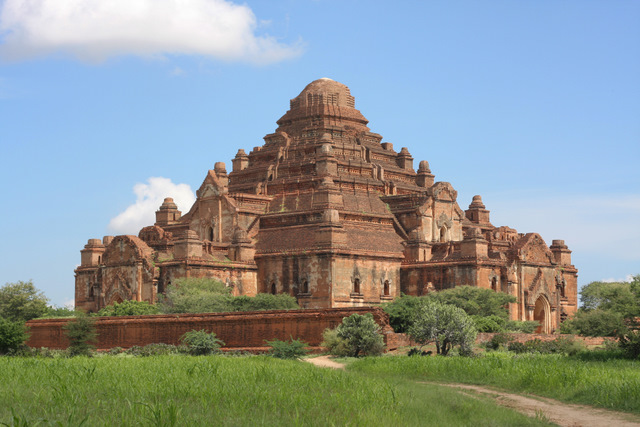
Dhammayangyi Temple, Bagan (1165)

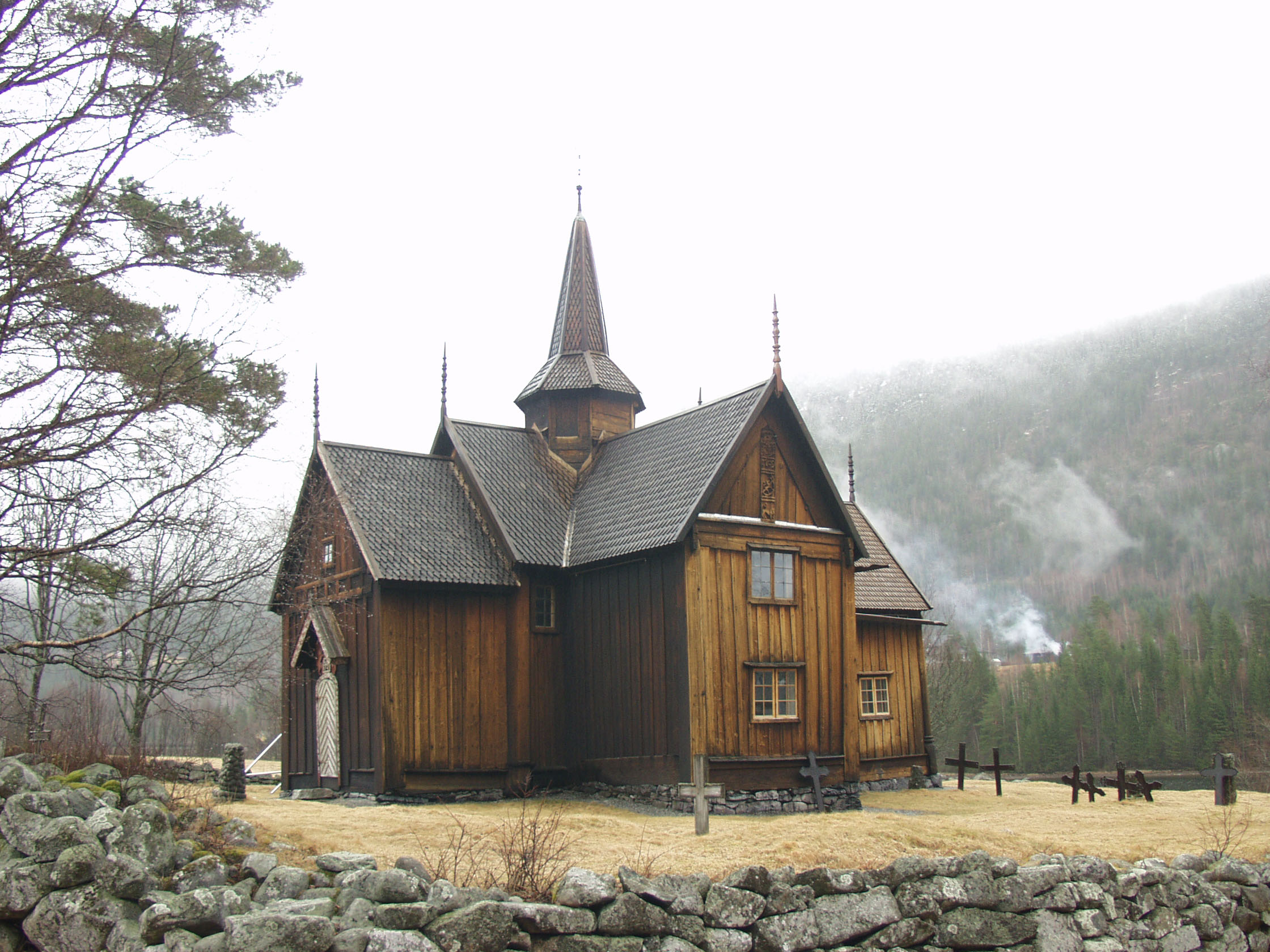
Nore stave church (1167)
