= Gades =

Gades may refer to:

- Cádiz, a city in southwestern Spain, known as Gādēs in Latin
- Antonio Gades (1936–2004), a Spanish dancer and choreographer
- Hudson Valley Renegades, a minor league baseball team, nicknamed the Gades
- Gades, an antagonist in the Lufia video game series
- Gwen Gades, Canadian publisher and founder of Dragon Moon Press

== See also ==
- Gade (disambiguation)
- Hades (disambiguation)
