= Herman Baars =

Norwegian fisheries commissioner

Herman Brunchorst Baars (13 April 1822 – 5 September 1896) was a Norwegian fisheries commissioner.

He was born in Bergen as a son of Søren Baars and his wife Divert Brunchorst. He was a cousin of Fredrik Georg Gade. In 1855 he married Margrethe Elisabeth Konow (1832–1881).

He took a business education, and worked as a city treasurer in Bergen from 1868. He was the Norwegian commissary at the international fisheries exhibitions in Amsterdam 1861 and Boulogne-sur-Mer 1866, and secretary at the exhibition in Bergen in 1865. He was also a delegate to world's fairs, including the Centennial Exposition of 1876. In all his work had a "large significance" for fisheries in Norway, wrote Norsk biografisk leksikon.
