= Fredrik Georg Gade =

Norwegian physician (1855–1933)

- Born: 21 March 1855; Bergen, Norway
- Died: 1 March 1933 (aged 77); Vestre Aker, Norway
- Citizenship: Norwegian
- Education: Royal Frederick University
- Scientific career
- Fields: anatomy microbiology cancer research

Fredrik Georg Gade (21 March 1855 – 1 March 1933) was a Norwegian physician.

== Personal life ==
He was born in Bergen as the son of merchant Fredrik Georg Gade (1830–1905) and his wife Ingeborg Wallem (1830–1902). The family originated in Lüneburg; an ancestor had migrated to Norway in the eighteenth century. The name Fredrik Georg was a family tradition. He was the brother of Herman Gerhard Gade, and a first cousin of Fredrik Barbe Wallem, Fredrik Herman Gade and John Allyne Gade.

Gade married twice. His first marriage, to Augusta Smith-Petersen (1858–1936), a daughter of Morten Smith-Petersen, lasted from September 1881 to 1898—she later married Christian Sinding. Secondly, Gade married Louise Kiær (1866–1959) in June 1908. She was a Danish citizen. The couple settled at Heggeli in Vestre Aker.

Gade was a skilled amateur violinist, and played together with composer and conductor Iver Holter while studying. He also befriended cultural and political personalities such as Edvard Grieg, Georg Brandes, Jonas Lie, Alexander Kielland and Christian Michelsen.

== Career ==
Despite the tendency in his family to work in the business life, Gade had an academic career. After finishing his secondary education in 1872, he graduated from the Royal Frederick University with the cand.med. degree in 1880. He was employed at Rikshospitalet, and from 1888 he also worked at the Royal Frederick University. He had the title prosector from 1891. He also held lectures in anatomy at the Bergen Academy of the Arts. In 1900 he had been considered as the replacement of professor Hjalmar Heiberg, but since Gade did not hold a doctorate, the position went to Francis Harbitz. Both candidates delivered a paper as a part of the assessment process; Gade's paper Om patologisk-anatomiske forandringer i vævene af neurotrofisk oprindelse was later considered as a doctor's thesis. Gade received the dr.med. degree later in 1900. He left the university in 1906.

Gade was among the pioneers in microbiology. He stayed in Berlin in 1885 and 1890, where Robert Koch did ground-breaking work in the field. He also visited Carl Friedländer, Carl Weigert, Victor André Cornil, Louis-Antoine Ranvier and Louis-Charles Malassez. In Norway, together with Klaus Hanssen and Hans Juell, he did pioneer work in fighting tuberculosis, leading to the Tuberculosis Act of 1900. In addition, he was one of Norway's first cancer researchers. This endeavor became even more pressing as he lost his son to tuberculosis in 1905. In addition to his academic work, he also wrote popular-scientific books, including 1929's Kreftsykdommene, deres vesen, utbredelse og bekjempelse. En almenfattelig fremstilling. He edited the journal Norsk magasin for lægevidenskaben from 1893 to 1897 and 1912 to 1927, and engaged himself in the public debate, siding with the political liberals of the day.

Gade was decorated as a Commander, Second Class of the Royal Norwegian Order of St. Olav. The Gade Institute at Haukeland Hospital, a forerunner of the Faculty of Medicine at the University of Bergen, is named after him. In 1924 he became an honorary member of the Norse Federation, an organization of which he had been a co-founder and vice chairman from 1907. He was a central board member of the Liberal Left Party from 1921 to 1922. He died in 1933 from bronchial cancer, his wife outliving him by twenty-six years.
