= Fredrik Georg Gade (businessman) =

Norwegian businessperson and politician

Fredrik Georg Gade (4 June 1830 – 16 May 1905) was a Norwegian businessperson and politician for the Liberal Party.

He was born in Bergen as the son of merchant Fredrik Georg Gade and his wife Anna. His ancestor had migrated to Norway from Hannover in the second half of the eighteenth century. In February 1854 he married Ingeborg Wallem (1830–1902), a sister of Fredrik Meltzer Wallem.

Gade began working in his father's manufacture business F. G. Gade around the age of Confirmation, and took over the company in 1849. As he did not acquire burghership until 1853, the company was run by his first cousin Herman Baars in the first phase. The company eventually went well, and in 1877 Gade retired from business, buying the farm Øvre Fantoft in Fana Municipality. He developed the surrounding area, and even bought a stave church which stood at Fortun in Nordre Bergenshu, had it moved and re-erected it as Fantoft stave church. This church burned down in 1993 under gloomy circumstances. Gade also took much of the initiative to found the Nesttun–Os Railway, and was an important shareholder.

From 1880 to 1896 Gade was the American consul for all of Western Norway, including the coast up to Vardø in the north. He also served on Bergen city council from 1880 to 1895, being a member of the movement which would become the Liberal Party. He successfully stood for election in 1882, and served one term in the Parliament of Norway, from 1883 to 1885. When Johan Sverdrup became prime minister in 1884, Gade was a candidate for a government minister position, but declined the offer. He wanted to back out of national politics, and only served as a deputy representative during the term 1886–1888.

Gade also founded two insurance companies, Vesta in 1880 and Hygea in 1884 (often branded as the same company, "Vesta-Hygea"), and was a board member of both companies until his death. He was also a board member of Den Nationale Scene.

Gade was the father of Fredrik Georg Gade, Jr. and Herman Gerhard Gade, both notable physicians. His daughter Emma married Anders Lorange. Through his brother Gerhard he was an uncle of Fredrik Herman Gade and John Allyne Gade, and through his wife he was an uncle of Fredrik Barbe Wallem.
