= Marten Gäde =

German politician (born 1986)

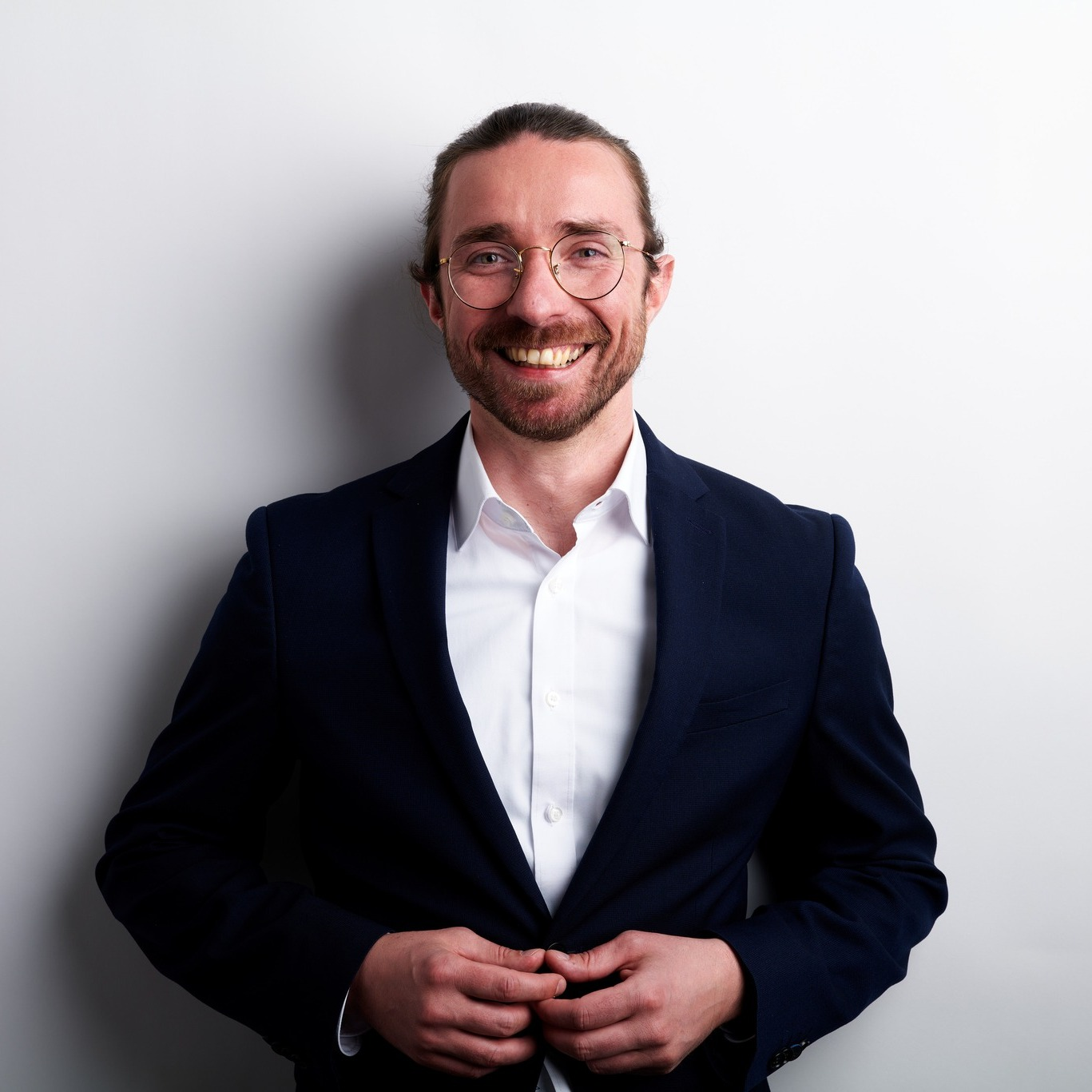
- Gäde in 2022

Member of the Landtag of Lower Saxony
- Incumbent
- Assumed office 8 November 2022
- Preceded by: Holger Ansmann
- Constituency: Wilhelmshaven

Personal details
- Born: 1 October 1986 (age 40)
- Party: Social Democratic Party (since 2010)

Marten Gäde (born 1 October 1986) is a German politician serving as a member of the Landtag of Lower Saxony since 2022. He has served as chairman of the Social Democratic Party in Wilhelmshaven since 2019.
