= Gade (artist) =

Tibetan artist (born 1971)

- Born: 1971 (age 54–55); Lhasa, Tibet
- Known for: Contemporary Tibetan art, mixed media, thangka appropriation
- Notable work: The Hulk (2008), Ice Buddha Sculpture No.1 Lhasa River (2006)

Gade (born 1971) is a contemporary Tibetan artist and curator known for combining traditional Tibetan iconography with global pop culture references. He is based in Lhasa, Tibet, where he serves as Vice Chairman of the Tibet Artists Association and teaches at the Tibet University College of Oil Painting.

== Biography ==
Gade was born in Lhasa. He began studying art at Tibet University at the age of fifteen, graduating in 1991 and later joining the faculty. In 1993, he enrolled in the Central Academy of Fine Arts (CAFA) in Beijing, where he studied art history and later earned a master’s degree in art management from CAFA's School of Humanities in 2012.

In 2003, Gade founded the Gedun Choephel Art Space in Lhasa, the first gallery dedicated to contemporary Tibetan art. The space provided a platform for artists to reach international audiences beyond official exhibition systems in China. He is a founding member of the Gedun Choephel Artists' Guild. In 2010, he co-curated the exhibition Scorching Sun over Tibet with art critic Li Xianting at the Songzhuang Art Center in Beijing, recognized as the first major museum exhibition of contemporary Tibetan art in mainland China.

His major series include Ice Buddha, New Sutras, New Icons, Prayer Beads, and Bodhi Leaves. Gade’s work has been featured in exhibitions such as the 18th Biennale of Sydney (2012), and is held in collections including the National Art Museum of China, Rubin Museum of Art (New York), White Rabbit Gallery (Sydney), University of Colorado Art Museum, Museum of Fine Arts of Valencia, and the World Museum Liverpool. He has held solo exhibitions at Rossi & Rossi (London and Hong Kong), as well as in New Mexico.

== Assessment ==
Gade is considered a pioneering figure in the development of contemporary Tibetan art. His work often juxtaposes traditional Tibetan Buddhist iconography with elements of global pop culture, reflecting a deliberate attempt to secularize the visual language of Tibetan painting. Rather than reinforcing conventional religious expectations, his paintings challenge stereotypical representations of Tibet and present a hybrid visual culture shaped by modern urban life in Lhasa, globalization, and personal agency. His well-known painting Father's Nightmare, for example, mixes traditional motifs with unexpected symbols such as mass-produced mannequins and Hollywood film references, highlighting both cultural collision and reinvention.

His work is also interpreted as a form of cultural resistance and identity reconstruction in the face of Chinese state narratives and colonial pressures. According to art historian Angela Ryan, Gade’s approach destabilizes hegemonic ideas of Tibetan authenticity by employing irony, pastiche, and secular appropriation of sacred forms. In a similar vein, Clare Harris emphasizes that Gade’s contribution lies in his ability to create an artistic discourse that challenges both Western romanticism and Chinese ethnonationalism by articulating a distinctly Tibetan modernity through art.
