= Fortun (village) =

Village in Luster Municipality, Norway

- Village
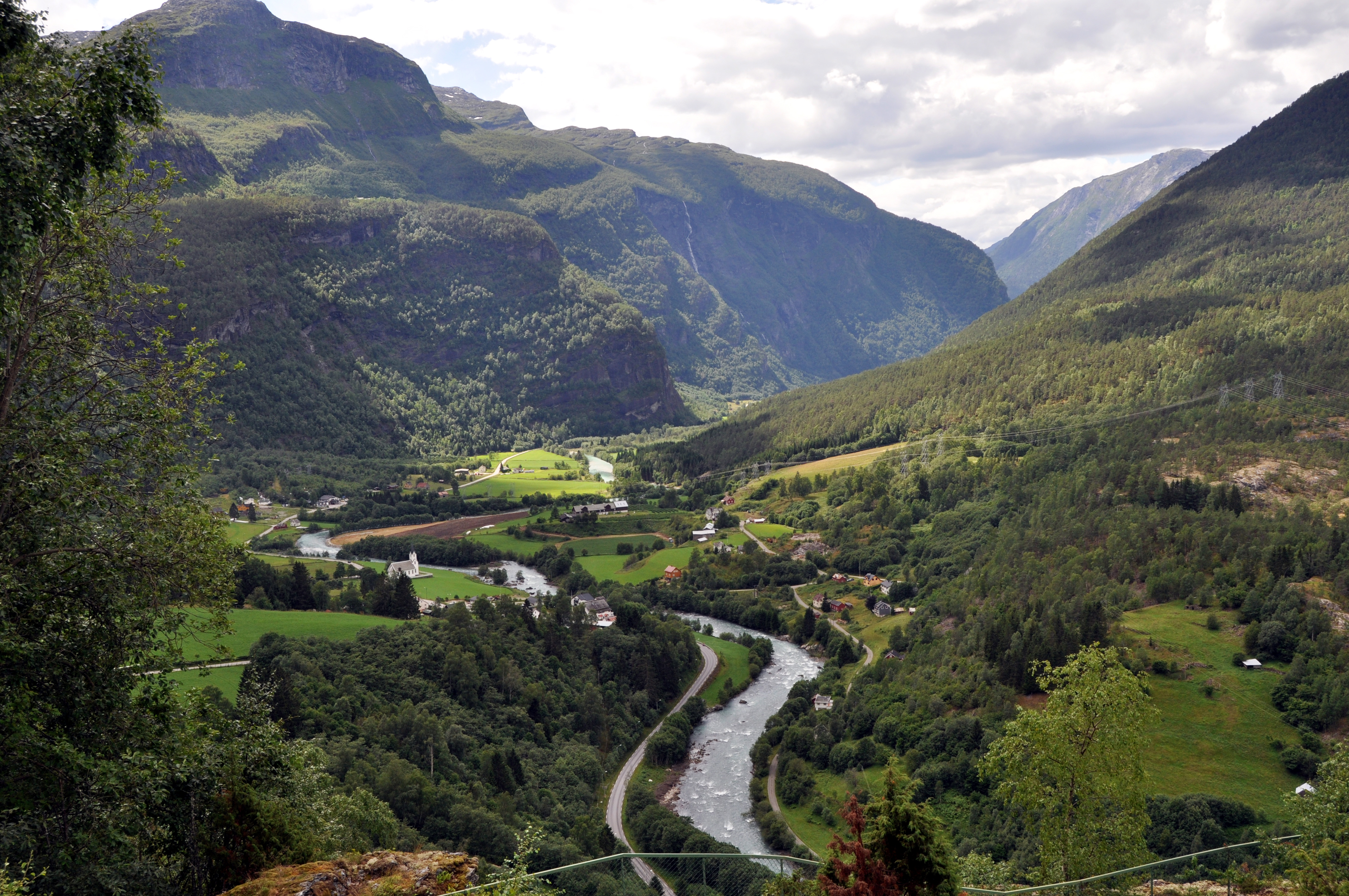
- View of the village area
- Interactive map of Fortun
- Location within Vestland Location within Norway
- Coordinates: 61.49509°N 7.68878°E
- Country: Norway
- Region: Western Norway
- County: Vestland
- District: Sogn
- Municipality: Luster Municipality
- Elevation: 32 m (105 ft)
- Time zone: UTC+01:00 (CET)
  - Summer (DST): UTC+02:00 (CEST)
- Post Code: 6877 Fortun

Fortun is a village in Luster Municipality in Vestland county, Norway. The village is located in the Fortundalen valley, just east of Skjolden, at the innermost part of the Lustrafjorden. The Sognefjellsvegen road passes through the village. Fortun is an old church site, having a stave church on the site since the 12th century. The present Fortun Church was built in 1879 in the village, and it serves the eastern part of the municipality. The Hurrungane mountains lie just to the south of the village. The area is known for its scenery and attracts many tourists.
