= Fredrik Herman Gade =

Norwegian-American attorney (1871–1943)

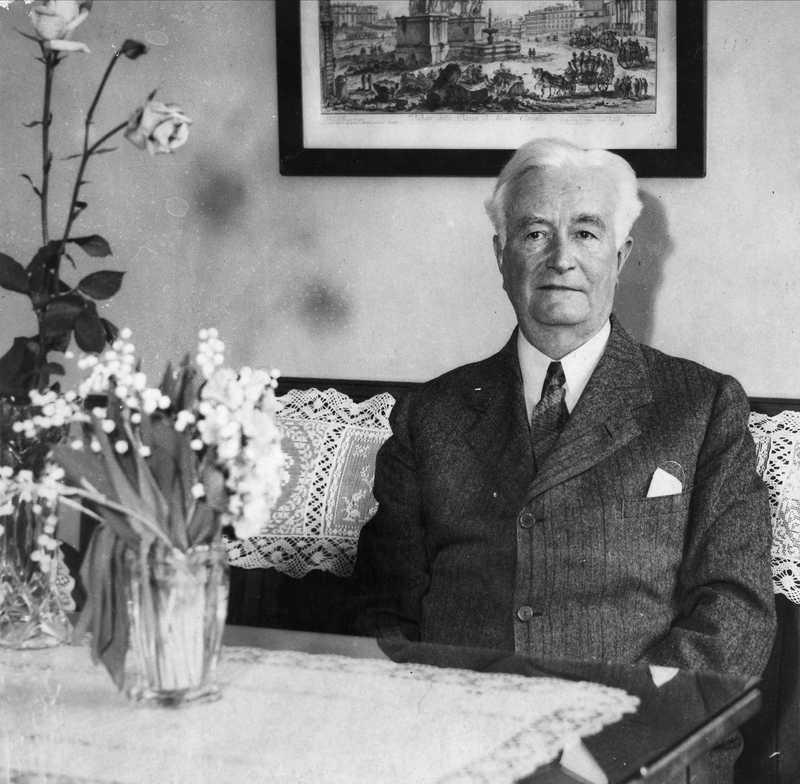
Fredrik Herman Gade in 1935

Fredrik Herman Gade (12 August 1871 – 20 February 1943) was a Norwegian-American attorney, elected official, diplomat and ambassador.

== Biography ==
Fredrik Herman Gade was born at Frogner Manor near Christiania (now Oslo), Norway. He was a son of United States consul Gerhard Gade (1834–1909) and his American-born wife Helen Allyne. He was a brother of John Allyne Gade, a nephew of Fredrik Georg Gade, Sr and a first cousin of Herman Gerhard Gade and Fredrik Georg Gade, Jr.

After growing up in Norway he emigrated to the United States in 1888. In 1889 he entered Harvard University Law School. He graduated with a Bachelor of Arts degree in 1892 and a Bachelor of Law degree in 1895. He practiced law in Chicago from 1895 to 1900. In May 1897 he married American citizen Alice Garfield King (1871-1938), daughter of Charles B. King and Ella Garfield King. They settled in Lake Forest, Illinois, where Gade served as mayor for four terms (1903-1906 & 1909-1910).

Following the Dissolution of the union between Norway and Sweden in 1905, Norway became responsible for conducting its own foreign policy. Gade was made Norwegian consul in Chicago the next year. He returned to Norway in 1910 to work for Ministry of Foreign Affairs, but did not get his citizenship back until after a two-year stay. This caused a mild controversy, known as the "Gade case". In 1912 he was hired in the Norwegian foreign service. From 1918 he was stationed in Brazil, the first year as acting chargé d'affaires, then as minister (ambassador) and consul-general. He died in 1943 in Paris, France.
