= Alexandra Gade =

Nuclear physicist

- Known for: In-beam nuclear spectroscopy
- Scientific career
- Fields: Experimental Nuclear Physics
- Doctoral advisor: Peter von Brentano

Alexandra Gade (born 1974) is a nuclear physicist who studies the nuclear structure of exotic nuclei far from stability, using experimental techniques such as gamma-ray spectroscopy and reactions including nucleon knockout and intermediate-energy Coulomb excitation. Educated in Germany, she works at Michigan State University in the US as a professor of physics in the department of physics and astronomy and as scientific director of the Facility for Rare Isotope Beams.

== Education and career ==
Gade studied experimental nuclear physics at the University of Cologne, working there with Peter von Brentano. She earned a diploma in 1998, and completed her doctorate (Dr. rer. nat.) in 2002.

After postdoctoral research at the National Superconducting Cyclotron Laboratory (NCSL) at Michigan State University, she continued at the NCSL as an assistant professor beginning in 2004, and added an affiliation as an assistant professor of physics at Michigan State in 2006. She was promoted to associate professor in 2009 and full professor in 2013.

From 2015 to 2022 she was chief scientist for the NCSL, and from 2020 till 2023 deputy scientific director of the Facility for Rare Isotope Beams (FRIB). In November 2023 she was appointed scientific director of FRIB.

== Recognition ==
Gade was named a Fellow of the American Physical Society (APS) in 2013, after a nomination from the APS Division of Nuclear Physics, "for her work in developing sensitive techniques based on gamma-ray detection to explore the properties of rare isotopes". In 2020 she was named as a Fellow of the American Association for the Advancement of Science, "for distinguished contributions to the field of nuclear physics, particularly for gamma-ray spectroscopy of rare isotopes and elucidating the structural properties of nuclei".

She was the 2015 recipient of the Zdzisław Szymański Prize of the University of Warsaw, given "in recognition of her leadership in the exploration of the structure of exotic nuclei at the extremes of neutron to proton ratio and, in particular, for her seminal studies of spectroscopic factors in nuclei far from the valley of nuclear stability". The diploma was awarded on September 12th during the XXXIV Mazurian Lakes Conference of Physics held in September 6–13, 2015 at Piaski, Poland.
