= Fredrik Barbe Wallem =

Norwegian art historian

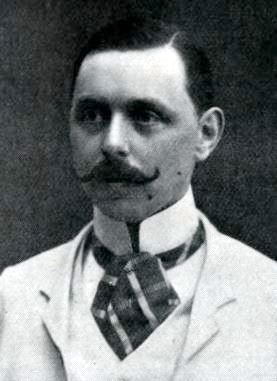
- Born: 29 November 1877; Bergen, Norway
- Died: 3 July 1945 (aged 67)
- Occupation: Art historian

Fredrik Barbe Wallem (29 November 1877 – 3 July 1945) was a Norwegian art historian.

He was born in Bergen; the son of Fredrik Meltzer Wallem and Louise Adelaide Barbe. His father was a fisheries inspector. He studied archeology and art history at the University of Kristiania. His thesis (dr.philos. 1910) treated Icelandic churches of the Middle Ages. In 1916 he wrote a book on the first hundred years of the Norwegian Students' Society.

From 1911–1920 he worked at the University of Kristiania Ethnographic Museum and the Antiquities Collection in Oslo. He was manager of the Nordenfjeldske Kunstindustrimuseum in Trondheim from 1920 to 1945, and lectured at the Norwegian Institute of Technology. He was a member of the Royal Norwegian Society of Sciences and Letters.

== Selected works ==
- Østraat (1916)
- Steinvikholmen (1917)
- Trondheims historie (1906,1927)
- Det Norske Studentersamfunds historie (1913)
- Olavsbilder i middelalderen (1930)
