= John Allyne Gade =

American architect (1875–1955)

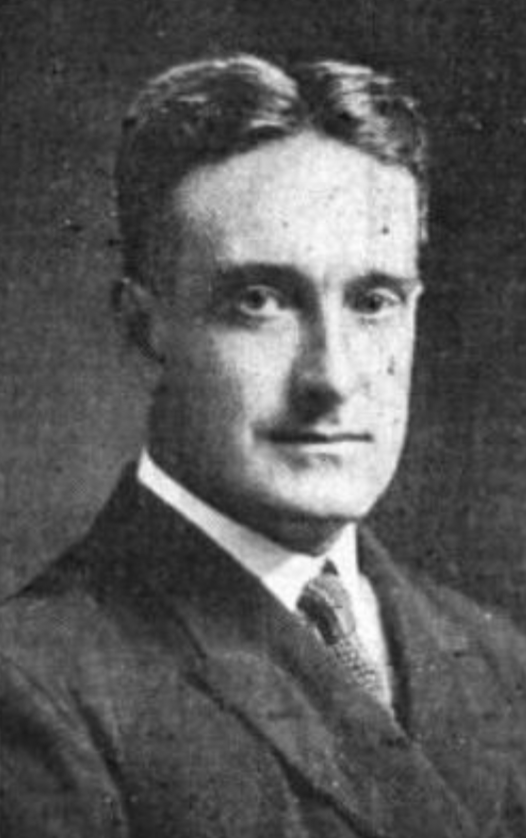
Portrait of John Allyne Gade (The Norwegian American Chamber of Commerce, Inc. Bulletin, October 1919)

John Allyne Gade (10 February 1875 – 16 August 1955) was an American architect, naval officer, diplomat, investment banker and writer.

== Background ==
John Gade was born in Cambridge, Massachusetts as the son of Gerhard Gade (1834–1909) of Christiania (now Oslo), Norway, who was the American consul for Eastern Norway, and his American-born wife Helen Allyne. John Gade grew up at his father's estate Frogner Manor near Christiania. He was a brother of Fredrik Herman Gade.

Gade had his early education in Norway. At the age of 13, he was sent to schools in Paris and later Braunschweig, Germany, where he became fluent in French and German in addition to his native English and Norwegian. Gade had wanted to enter West Point, but arrived too late to gain entry in 1892. He chose instead to study architecture at Harvard University.

== Career ==
After graduation Gade was offered a position with the architect firm of McKim, Mead and White in New York City. In 1907 he established his own office in New York City. In the fall of that year, he married Ruth Sibley of Rochester, New York.

Before the United States entered the World War I, Gade as a citizen of two neutral countries was able to join Herbert Hoover's U.S. Commission for Relief in Belgium, delivering food to the population under German occupation. Gade returned to the U.S. in April 1917. Gabe was a friend of Franklin D. Roosevelt, at the time the assistant secretary of the Navy and served in the Naval Reserve. The multi-lingual Gade was found useful by U.S. Naval Intelligence, and was commissioned as a Navy lieutenant and sent as Assistant Naval Attaché to Oslo and then in 1918 as Naval Attaché to Copenhagen and promoted to lieutenant commander.

After the Armistice of November 1918, Gade went on a mission to the Baltic states and Finland where he met with Carl Gustaf Mannerheim. He was detailed to the U.S. Department of State and appointed Commissioner to the three Baltic states in October 1919, residing in Riga. He resigned from this posting in 1920 and asked the Navy to appoint a permanent attache' there to counteract the Bolsheviks and observe the Russian press. Back in the United States, he entered the banking firm of White, Weld & Co. This job involved frequent visits to Europe, where he bought the Château de Brécourt at Douains in Normandy, France. In 1929, while working for White & Weld, Gade proposed the creation of an American Central Intelligence Agency modeled on British intelligence.

In 1933 Lt. Commander Gade was appointed naval attaché to the U.S. embassy in Brussels and the legation in The Hague. From there he was transferred to Lisbon in 1936 and on to Brussels again in 1939, just before the outbreak of World War II. After the capitulation of the Belgian army, the U.S. embassy was closed during the summer of 1940, and Captain Gade returned to the United States and retirement at the age of 65.

During his whole life, Gade kept in close touch with Norway and made generous contributions to Norwegian institutions. His donations to the Roald Amundsen Antarctic expedition of 1911 prompted the explorer to name a tall mountain near the South Pole Mount Ruth Gade after Mrs. Gade. He became an honorary member of Oslo Military Society in recognition of his generous gifts of money and antique arms. Gade also contributed to the restoration of the Archbishop's Palace in Trondheim and Oslo Cathedral.

== Bibliography ==
Gade was a prolific author of architecture, history and biography. Some of his titles:

- Cathedrals of Spain, Boston and New York 1911.
- Charles the Twelfth, King of Sweden, Boston 1916. (With Carl Gustafson Klingspor).
- Christian IV, King of Denmark and Norway, Boston 1928.
- The Life of Cardinal Mercier, New York 1934.
- All My Born Days, New York 1942. (Autobiography).
- The Life and Times of Tycho Brahe, Princeton 1947.
- The Hanseatic Control of Norwegian Commerce During the Late Middle Ages, Leiden 1951.

== Related Reading ==
- Smith, W. Thomas (2003) Encyclopedia of the Central Intelligence Agency (Infobase Publishing) ISBN 9781438130187
