= Fet Church (Luster) =

Church in Vestland, Norway

- Fet kyrkje
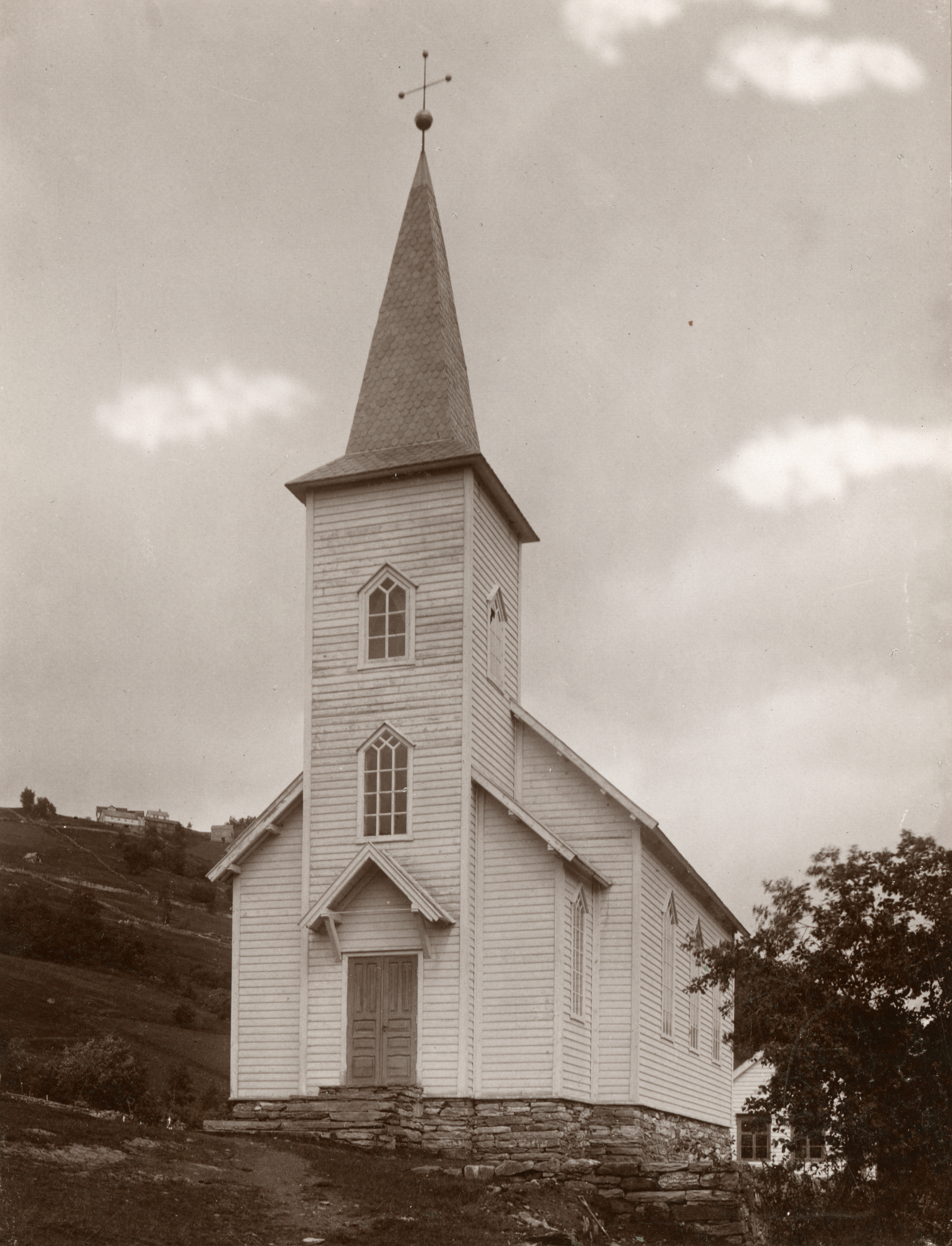
- View of the church
- Fet Church
- 61°21′44″N 7°15′40″E
- Location: Luster Municipality, Vestland
- Country: Norway
- Denomination: Church of Norway
- Previous denomination: Catholic Church
- Churchmanship: Evangelical Lutheran

History
- Status: Parish church
- Founded: 13th century
- Consecrated: 12 November 1894

Architecture
- Functional status: Active
- Architectural type: Long church
- Completed: 1894 (132 years ago)

Specifications
- Capacity: 220
- Materials: Wood

Administration
- Diocese: Bjørgvin bispedømme
- Deanery: Sogn prosti
- Parish: Fet og Joranger
- Norwegian Cultural Heritage Site
- Type: Church
- Status: Not protected
- ID: 84129

Fet Church (Norwegian: Fet kyrkje) is a parish church of the Church of Norway in Luster Municipality in Vestland county, Norway. It is located in the village of Fet in the Indre Hafslo area. It is one of the churches for the Fet og Joranger parish which is part of the Sogn prosti (deanery) in the Diocese of Bjørgvin. The white, wooden church was built in a long church design in 1894 by the master builder John Alver using plans drawn up by an unknown architect. The church seats about 220 people.

From the hill where Fet Church is located, it is not long way away to the neighboring Joranger Church. Historians have often wondered why these two churches were built in the Middle Ages so close together. Jon Laberg, the author of the old local history book for Hafslo discussed the reason that Fet and Joranger each have their own churches, even though these farms lie near to each other. Laberg thinks that the owners of these farms could not reach agreement on a common church, so they each built their own church. Today, these two churches belong to the same parish.

== History ==
The earliest existing historical records of the church date back to the year 1340, but the church was built before that time. The first church was a wooden long church that was likely built during the 13th century on a plot of land about 100 metres (330 ft) east of the present site of the church. Around 1650, the old stave church was torn down and replaced with a new church on the same site. The new church was a timber-framed long church. In 1894, the old church was torn down and a new church was constructed about 100 metres (330 ft) west to a more stable building site since the foundation of the older church was sinking into the soft soil. The new church building was built by John Alver. The church was consecrated on 12 November 1894 by Bishop Frederick Waldemar Hvoslef. During the 1960s, there were some renovations. Heating work was improved so the church wasn't as cold and drafty, new flooring was installed, and a new roof was installed. About 20 years later in the 1980s, the church was enlarged to make room for a bathroom and sacristy on the northeast side of the building.

== See also ==
- List of churches in Bjørgvin
