= Peter Dale =

Peter Dale may refer to:

- Peter Dale (poet) (1938–2024), British poet and translator
- Peter Dale (Derbyshire) on the Limestone Way
- Peter Dale (swimmer) (born 1963), Australian swimmer
- Dale Wimbrow (1895–1954), musical recording artist also known as Peter Dale
- Peter J. Dale (1845–1935), Wisconsin legislator

== See also ==
- Peter Dale Scott (born 1929), Canadian poet and English professor
