= Hans Jacob Sparre =

Norwegian architect

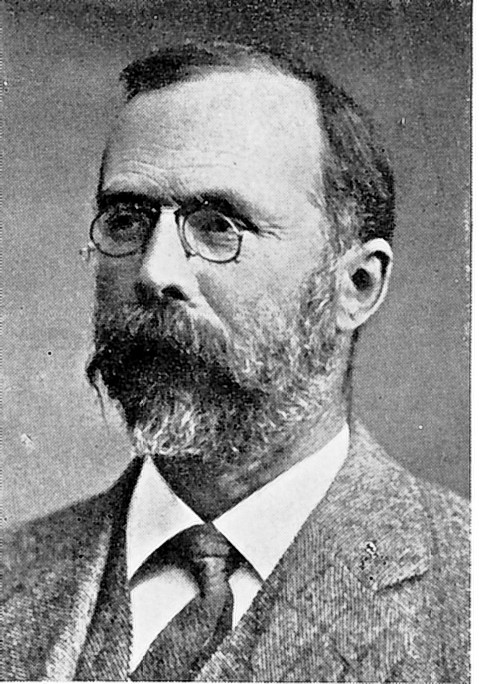
- Born: 18 November 1861; Nore, Norway
- Died: 2 June 1937 (aged 75); Vestre Aker, Norway
- Occupation: Architect
- Spouse: Agnes Martens
- Parent(s): Ole Jacob Sparre and Anne Petronelle Enger

Hans Jacob Sparre (1861—1937) was a Norwegian architect.

He was born in Nore, Norway in 1861 to Ole Jacob Sparre and Anne Petronelle Enger. He was educated in Hanover, Germany under C. W. Hase in 1883. After graduation, he worked in Arendal as a manager at a technical school for three years. From 1886 until 1892, he worked as an architect in Plauen, Oldenburg, and Berlin, Germany. From 1892 to 1896, Sparre was a city architect in Bergen, where he designed a building at Domkirkegaten 4 (1895) in the neo-Renaissance sRtyle. He moved to Kristiania in 1897, where he started his own architecture firm, partly in collaboration with Herman Major Backer. He is known for designing the justice building in 1903 which is the home of the Supreme Court of Norway.

He was the brother of Christian Sparre. He was a long-time member of the Liberal Party of Norway.

== Works ==
- Addition to the Bergen Museum (1897–98)
- Justisbygningen (Supreme Court of Norway), Kristiania (1895–1903)
- St. Johannes Church, Stavanger (1900)
- Sæle Church, Sogndal Municipality (1903)
- Gaupne Church, Luster Municipality (1907)
- Stemshaug Church, Aure Municipality (1908)
- Sjøli Church, Rendalen Municipality (1914)
