= Luster (village) =

Village in Luster Municipality, Norway

- Village
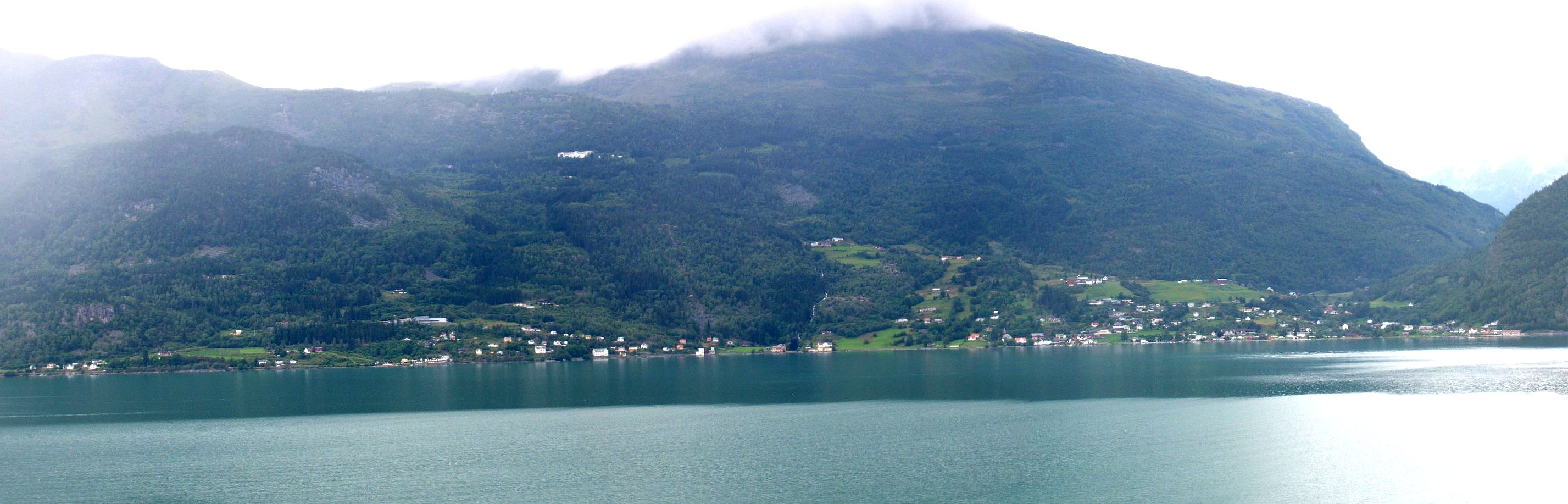
- View of the village
- Interactive map of Luster
- Location within Vestland Location within Norway
- Coordinates: 61.44322°N 7.45992°E
- Country: Norway
- Region: Western Norway
- County: Vestland
- District: Sogn
- Municipality: Luster Municipality

Area
  - Total: 0.56 km^{2} (0.22 sq mi)
- Elevation: 5 m (16 ft)

Population (2003)
  - Total: 272
  - Density: 486/km^{2} (1,260/sq mi)
- Time zone: UTC+01:00 (CET)
  - Summer (DST): UTC+02:00 (CEST)
- Post Code: 6872 Luster

Luster is a village in Luster Municipality in Vestland county, Norway. The village is located on the western shore of the Lustrafjorden, at the mouth of the river Dalsdalselvi. Norwegian County Road 55 runs through the village, which is about half-way between the villages of Skjolden and Nes. Dale Church was built in the village of Luster in 1240 and it is still in use.

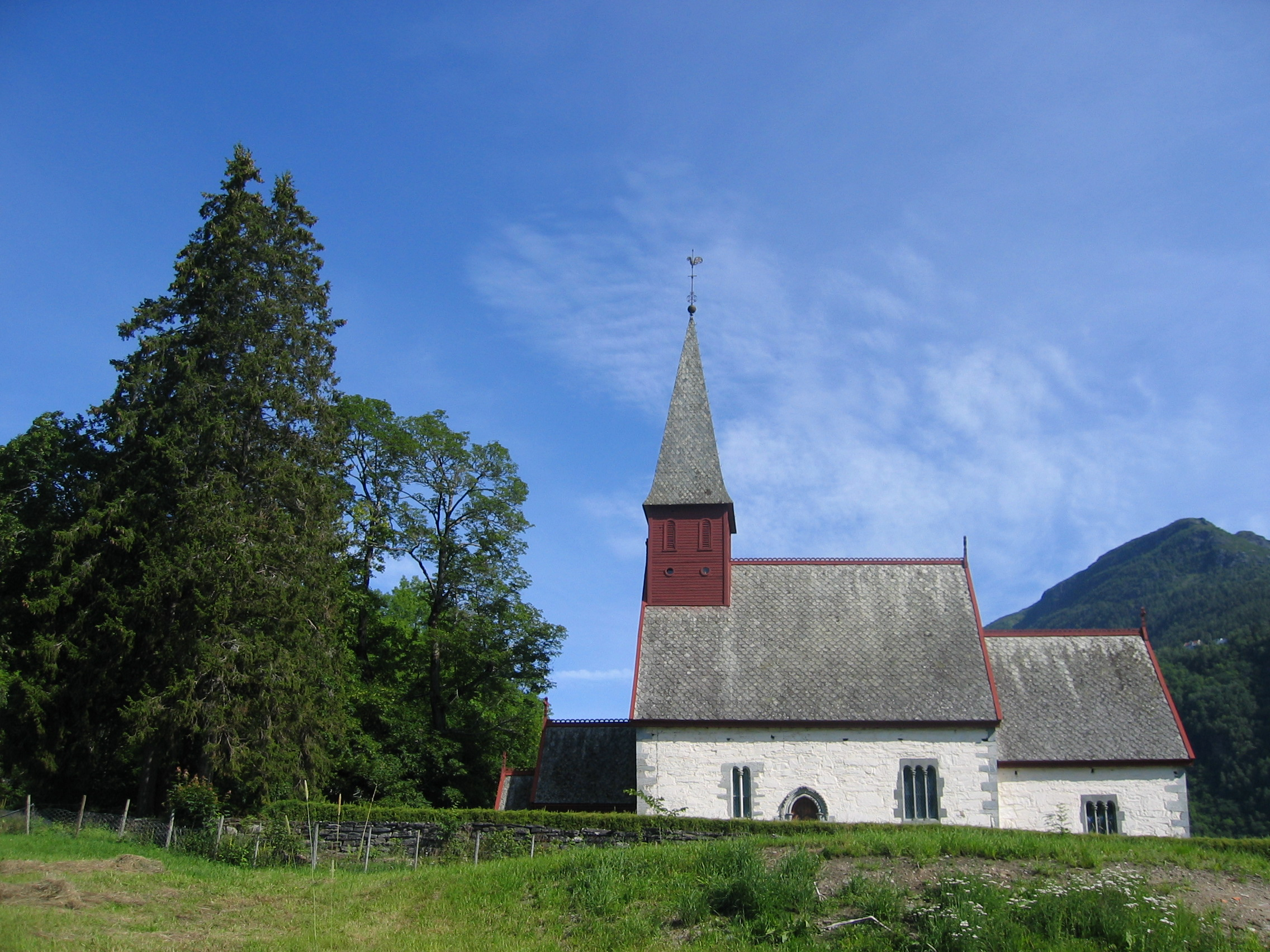
Dale Church

The 0.56-square-kilometre (140-acre) village had a population (2003) of 272 and a population density of 486 inhabitants per square kilometre (1,260/sq mi). Since 2003, the population and area data for this village area has not been separately tracked by Statistics Norway.

== Name ==
The name (Old Norse: Lústr) originally belonged to the fjord (now Lustrafjorden). The name is derived from the word ljóss which means "light" or "bright", referring to the bright color of the water from the glaciers. Prior to 1918, the name was written Lyster.
