= Christian Ellefson =

American politician (1842–c.1925)

Christian Ellefson (also called Christen) (April 20, 1842 – 1925?) was an American farmer from the Town of Franklin, in Vernon County, Wisconsin who served two separate one-year terms as an Independent Greenback member of the Wisconsin State Assembly.

== Background ==
Ellefson was born on April 20, 1842 in Lyster Municipality (now spelled Luster) in Nordre Bergenhus county, Norway. He received a common school education and became a farmer. He immigrated in 1860 and ended up in Dane County, Wisconsin; moved to Dakota Territory in 1861; then to Sioux City, Iowa, in 1864. He moved to Franklin in 1866, settling there.

== Public office ==
When first elected to the Assembly in 1877 to represent the first Vernon County district (Towns of Bergen, Christiana, Coon, Franklin, Genoa, Hamburg, Harmony, Jefferson, Sterling, and Wheatland), Ellefson had already been chairman and treasurer of his town, and had held other local offices. While at one time he had been a Republican, he ran as an "Independent Greenback." He received 813 votes, to 690 for Republican F. K. Van Wagner (Republican incumbent Peter J. Dale, also a native of Lyster, was not a candidate for re-election). He sought re-election in 1878 as a Greenback, but was unseated by Republican Jacob Eckhardt, who polled 939 votes to Ellefson's 804.

During this same period, he served on the Vernon County Board of Supervisors for 1876-1879.

In 1881, he ran for the Fourth State Senate District, receiving 1719 votes to Republican Van S. Bennett's 2,166 and 572 for Democrat J. A. Robb.

He was elected to his old Assembly seat as an Independent Greenback in 1883, with 915 votes to 628 for Republican H. H. Morgan (Republican incumbent Torger Juve was not a candidate for re-election). He was elected chairman of the standing committee on enrolled bills.

He sought re-election in 1884 as a Democrat, but lost to Republican Philip Bouffleur, who won 1407 votes to 771 for Ellefson and 44 for Prohibitionist G. H. Battles.

In 1892, he ran once again for what was now the only Vernon County Assembly seat, as a Democratic and Populist fusion candidate, losing with 1861 votes to 3077 for Republican Daniel O. Mahoney and 228 for Prohibitionist Gilbert Olson. He ran once more as a Democrat/Populist in 1896, this time losing with 1761 votes to 4264 for Republican Emilus Goodell.

== Family ==
He married Lena Michael, like himself a native of Norway; they had six children.
