= Harbardsbreen =

Glacier in Vestland, Norway

- Interactive map of Harbardsbreen
- Type: Mountain glacier
- Location: Vestland, Norway
- Coordinates: 61.66222°N 7.65222°E
- Area: 36 km^{2} (14 sq mi)

Harbardsbreen is the 10th largest glacier in mainland Norway. It is located on the south side of the Tverrådalskyrkja mountain in the Breheimen mountain range in Luster Municipality in Vestland county, Norway.

The 36-square-kilometre (14 sq mi) glacier is inside Breheimen National Park, just northeast of the Spørteggbreen glacier. The village of Skjolden lies 18 kilometres (11 mi) south of the glacier.

Its highest point lies 1,950 m (6,398 ft) above sea level and its lowest point 1,250 m (4,101 ft) above sea level.

== See also ==
- List of glaciers in Norway
