= Tor Bremer =

Norwegian politician (born 1955)

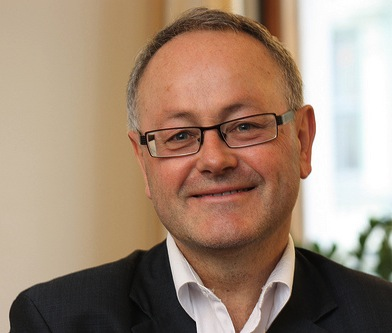
Tor Bremer

Tor Bremer (born 9 February 1955) is a Norwegian politician from Luster Municipality in Sogn og Fjordane county. He was deputy mayor of the Luster Municipality from 2003-2007 for the Arbeiderpartiet. At the 2009 Norwegian parliamentary election, he was the second candidate for the Arbeiderpartiet for the Sogn og Fjordane constituency.

Tor Bremer was leader of Sogn og Fjordane Arbeiderpartiet for a year.
