= Spørteggbreen =

Glacier in Vestland, Norway

- Interactive map of Spørteggbreen
- Type: Mountain glacier
- Location: Vestland, Norway
- Coordinates: 61.61611°N 7.46527°E
- Area: 28 km^{2} (11 sq mi)

Spørteggbreen is a glacier in Luster Municipality in Vestland county, Norway. It is the 12th largest glacier in Norway. It lies between the Jostedalsbreen and Harbardsbreen glaciers. The 28-square-kilometre (11 sq mi) glacier lies inside Breheimen National Park. The village of Jostedal lies 7 kilometres (4.3 mi) to the west and the village of Skjolden lies 12 kilometres (7.5 mi) to the southeast.

Grånosi (in the northeastern part of the glacier) is the highest point on the glacier at 1,750 metres (5,740 ft) above sea level, and the lowest point is at 1,270 metres (4,170 ft) above sea level.

== See also ==
- List of glaciers in Norway
