= Old Gaupne Church =

Church in Vestland, Norway

- Gaupne gamle kyrkje
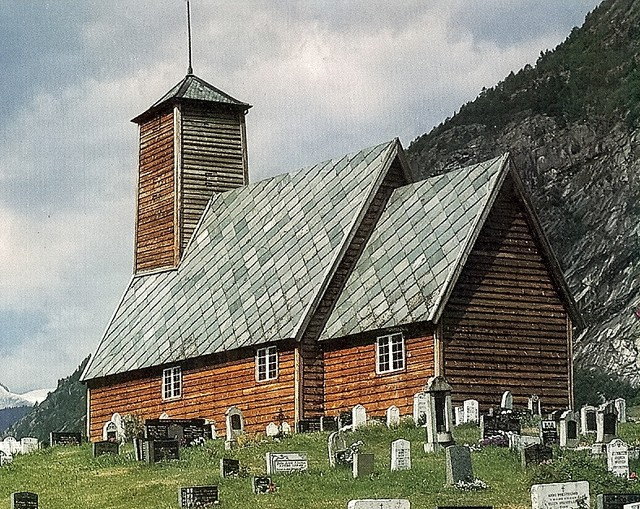
- View of the church
- Old Gaupne Church
- 61°24′30″N 7°17′46″E
- Location: Luster Municipality, Vestland
- Country: Norway
- Denomination: Church of Norway
- Churchmanship: Evangelical Lutheran

History
- Status: Former Parish church
- Founded: 12th century
- Consecrated: c. 1652

Architecture
- Functional status: Museum
- Architectural type: Long church
- Groundbreaking: c. 1647
- Completed: c. 1652 (374 years ago)
- Closed: 1907

Specifications
- Capacity: 130
- Materials: Wood

Administration
- Diocese: Bjørgvin bispedømme
- Deanery: Sogn prosti
- Parish: Gaupne
- Norwegian Cultural Heritage Site
- Type: Church
- Status: Automatically protected
- ID: 84236

Old Gaupne Church (Norwegian: Gaupne gamle kyrkje) is a historic parish church of the Church of Norway in Luster Municipality in Vestland county, Norway. It is located in the village of Gaupne. It was the main church for the Luster parish (which is part of the Sogn prosti (deanery) in the Diocese of Bjørgvin) until it was replaced in 1907. The brown, wooden church was built in a long church design about 1650 using plans drawn up by an unknown architect. The church seats about 130 people.

== History ==
The earliest existing historical records of the church date back to the year 1306, but the church was not new at that time. The first church on this site was a wooden stave church that was likely built during the second half of the 12th century. Around the year 1647, the old church was torn down and replaced with a timber-framed long church. The new building (now known as the "Old Gaupne Church") was built using several of the parts from the old stave church, including the side planks of the western portals. These planks, dating back to the second half of the 12th century, are now one of the standout features of the church, infused with detailed carvings of snakes and dragons. The church construction began in 1647, but it likely wasn't completely finished until 1652. The new building had a nave that measured about 13 by 8.5 metres (43 ft × 28 ft) and a square choir that measured about 5.5 by 5.5 metres (18 ft × 18 ft).

This "old" church was used from 1647 until 1907 when the new Gaupne Church was completed, about 460 metres (1,510 ft) to the northeast of the site of the old church. After the "new" church was in use, the "old" church was given for free to the Society for the Preservation of Ancient Norwegian Monuments in 1909. After this, the church underwent some significant restorations, particularly with the foundation and exterior siding. The society cares for the site and the parish uses the church for special occasions. The Old Gaupne Church is now well known for the annual St. Olaf's Day service that is held there. The church interior now largely resembles its historic 17th-century appearance. The walls are richly decorated with drawings and Bible verses.

== Media gallery ==
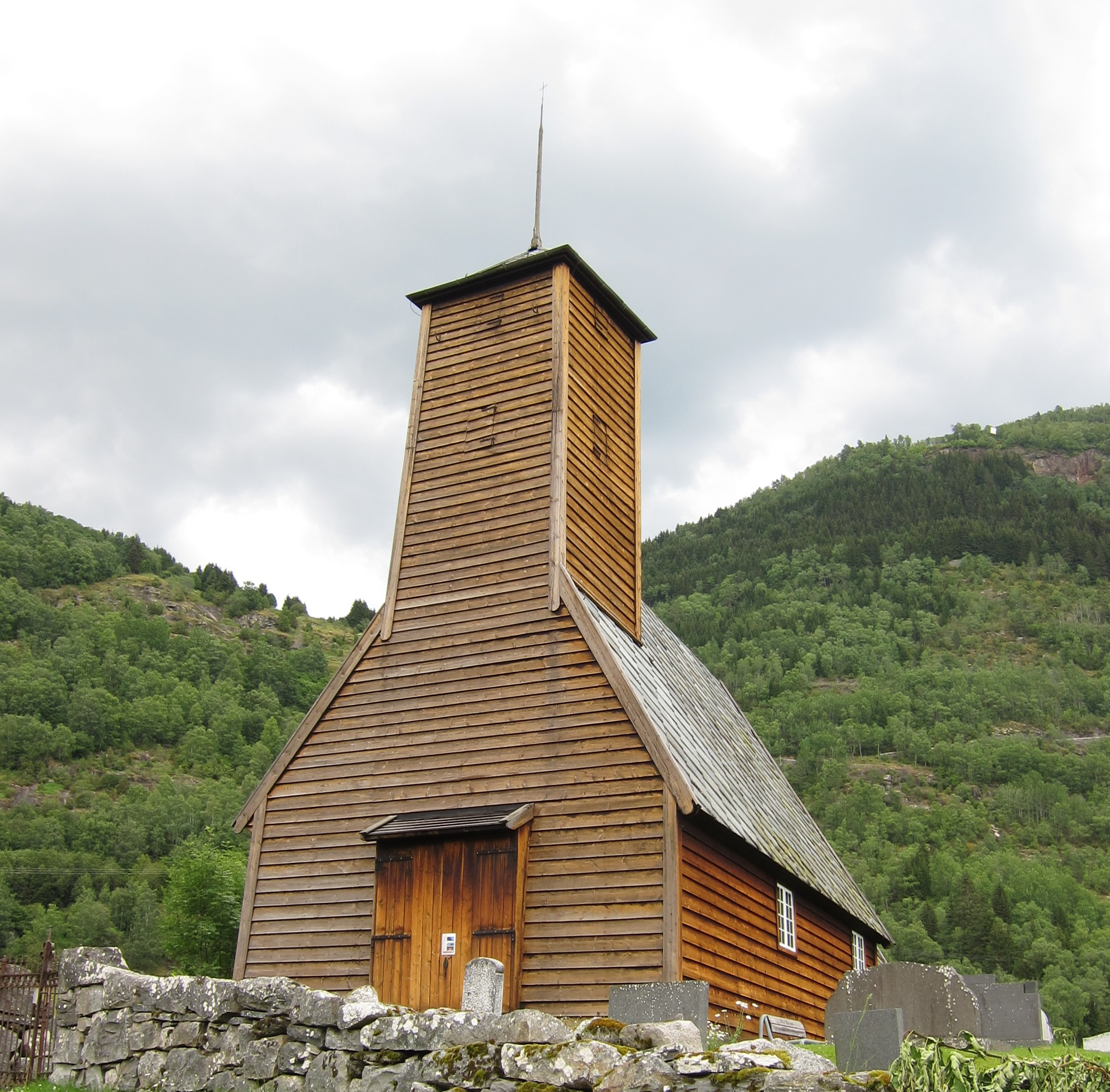

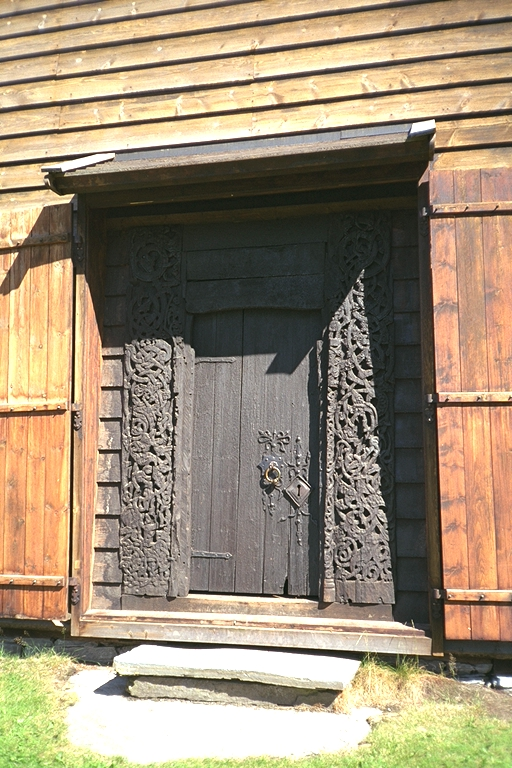

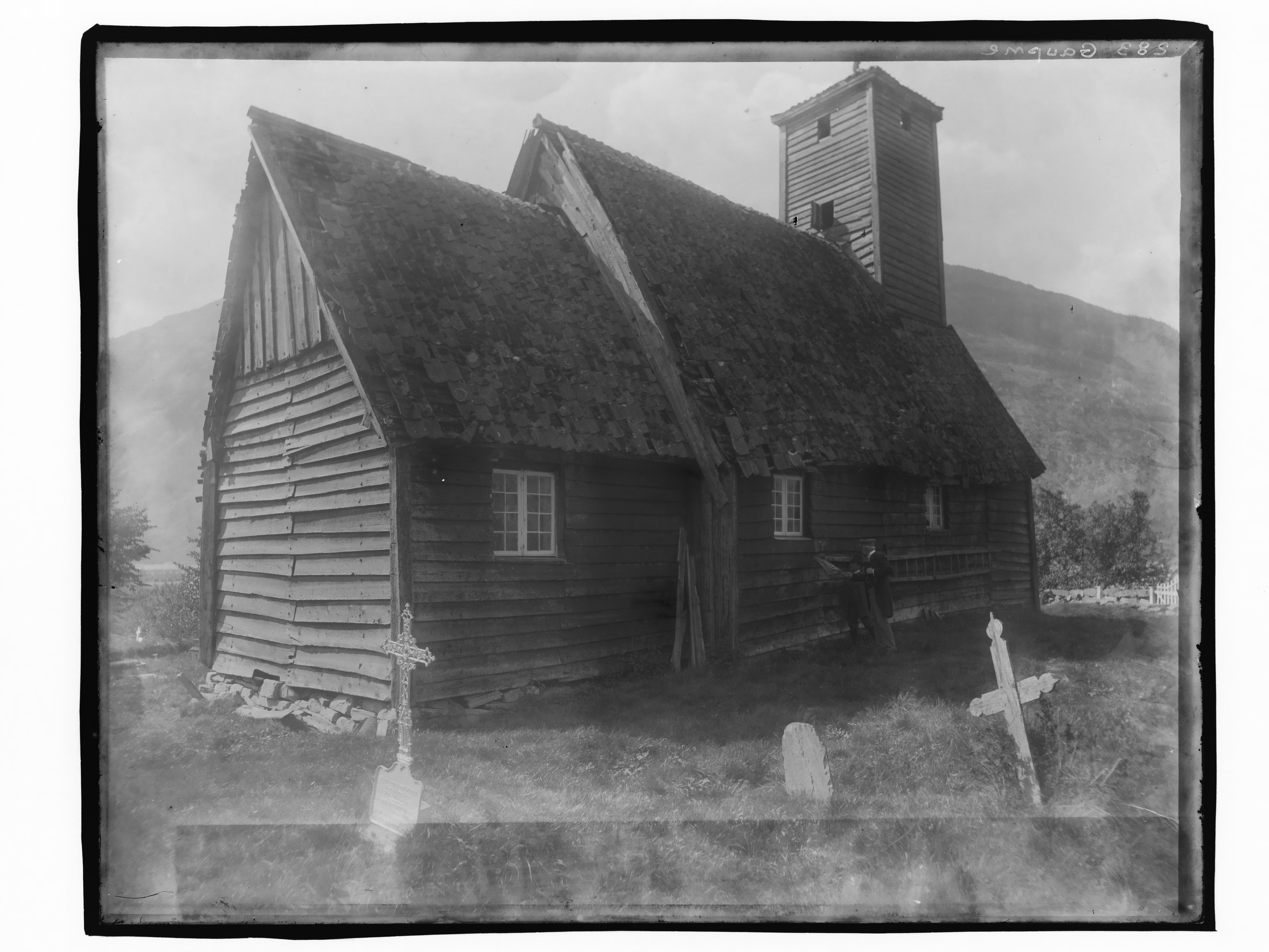

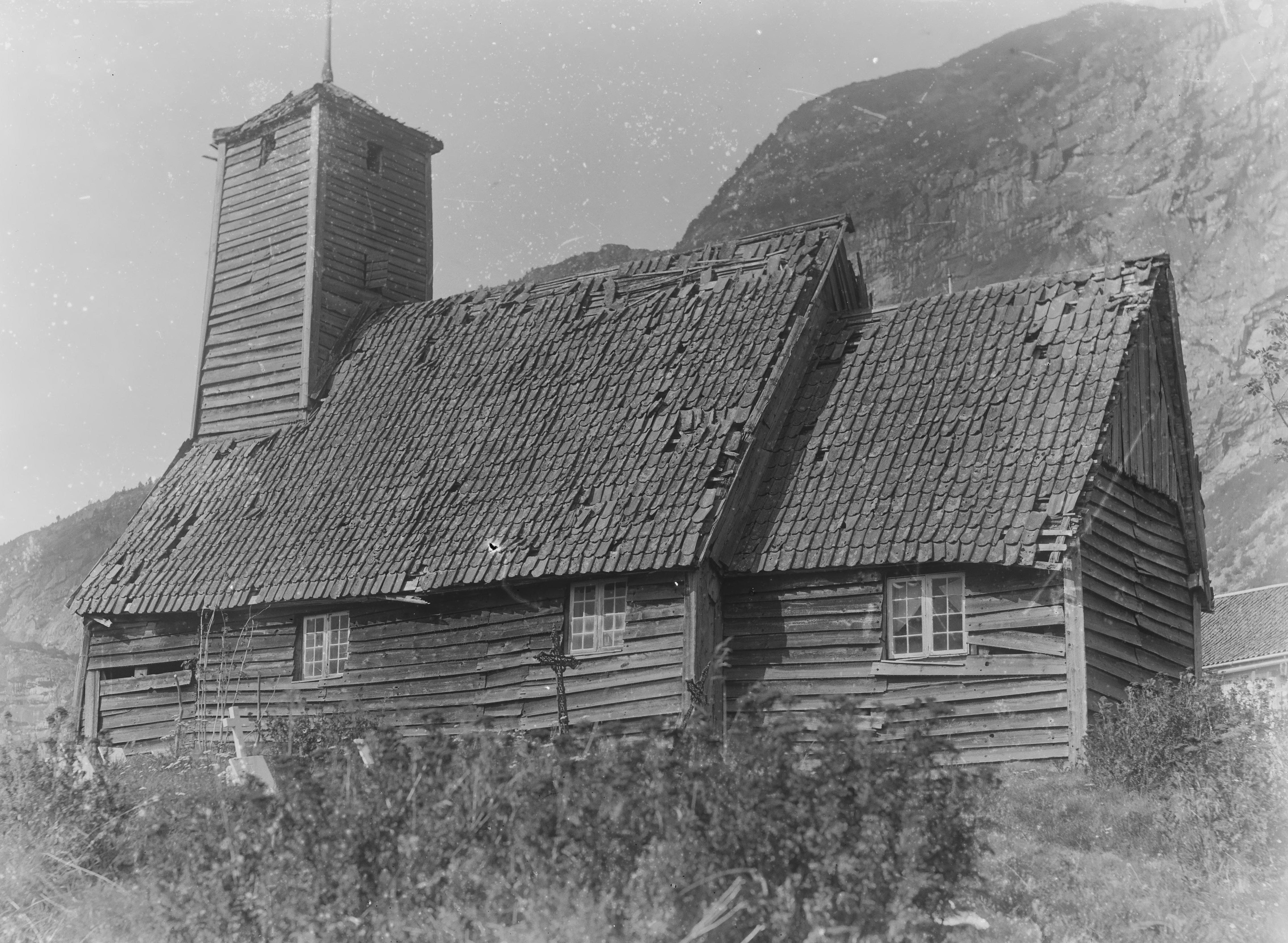

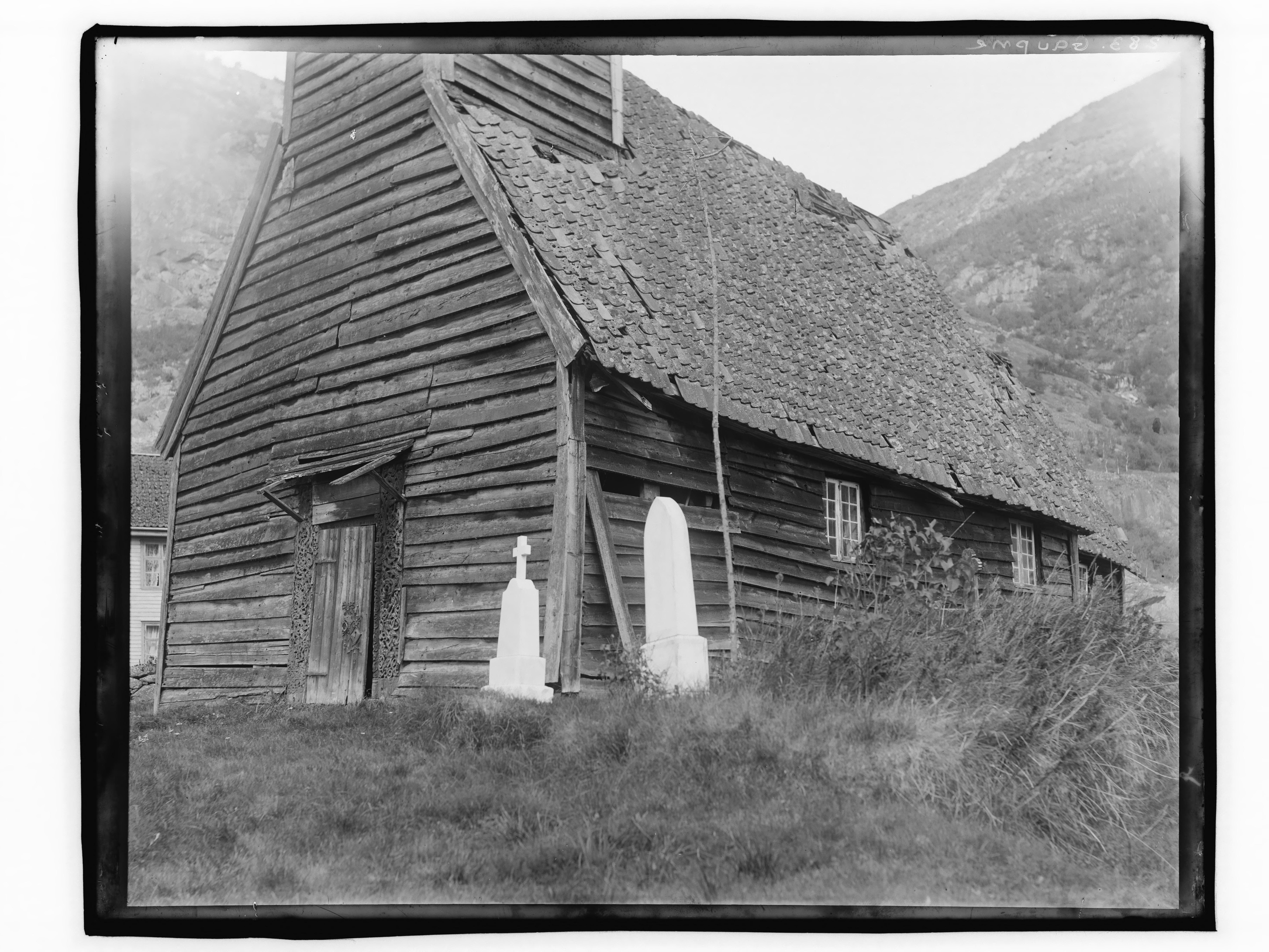

== See also ==
- List of churches in Bjørgvin
