= Sjøli Church =

Church in Innlandet, Norway

- Sjøli kirke
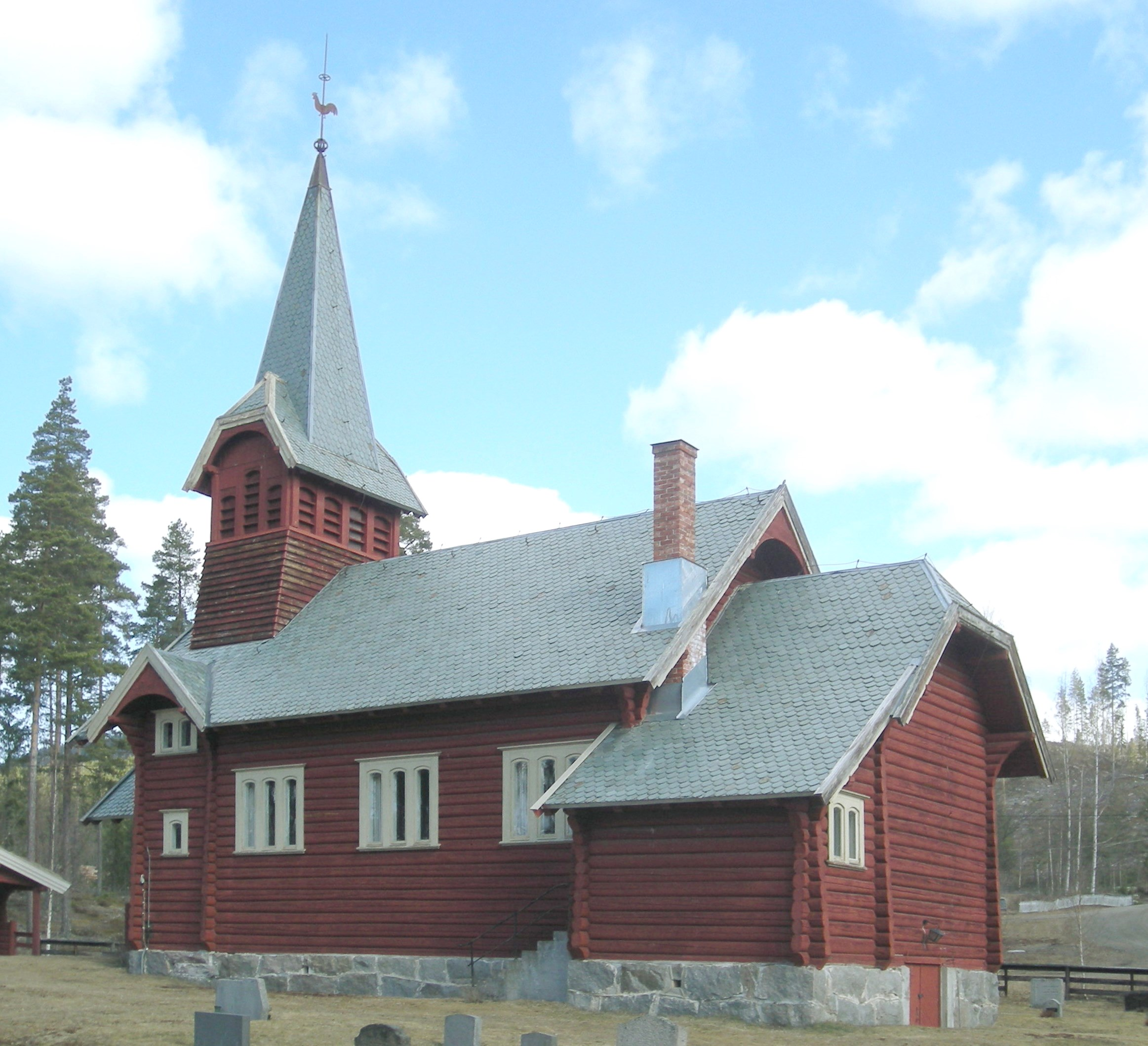
- View of the church
- Sjøli Church
- 61°28′43″N 11°18′23″E
- Location: Rendalen Municipality, Innlandet
- Country: Norway
- Denomination: Church of Norway
- Churchmanship: Evangelical Lutheran

History
- Status: Parish church
- Founded: 1914
- Consecrated: October 1914

Architecture
- Functional status: Active
- Architect: Hans Jacob Sparre
- Architectural type: Long church
- Completed: 1914 (112 years ago)

Specifications
- Capacity: 110
- Materials: Wood

Administration
- Diocese: Hamar bispedømme
- Deanery: Nord-Østerdal prosti
- Parish: Sjøli
- Norwegian Cultural Heritage Site
- Type: Church
- Status: Protected
- ID: 85439

Sjøli Church (Norwegian: Sjøli kirke) is a parish church of the Church of Norway in Rendalen Municipality in Innlandet county, Norway. It is located in the village of Sjølisand. It is the church for the Sjøli parish which is part of the Nord-Østerdal prosti (deanery) in the Diocese of Hamar. The brown, wooden church was built in a long church design in 1914 using plans drawn up by the architect Hans Jacob Sparre. The church seats about 110 people.

== History ==
In 1883, a new cemetery was constructed in Sjølisand. About 30 years later, the parish began planning for the construction of an annex chapel at the cemetery. Hans Jacob Sparre was hired to design the new chapel. The new log building was consecrated in October 1914. Many years later, the chapel was upgraded to parish church status.

== Media gallery ==
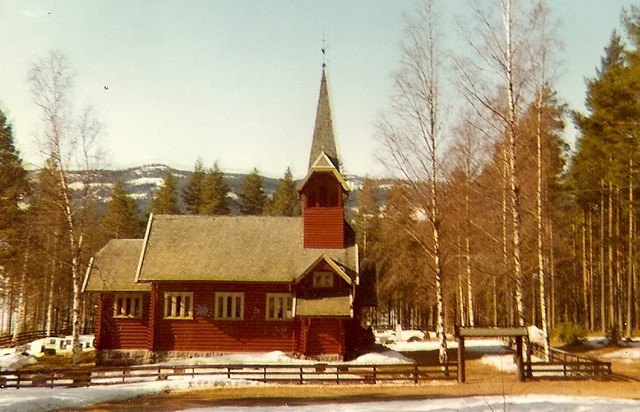

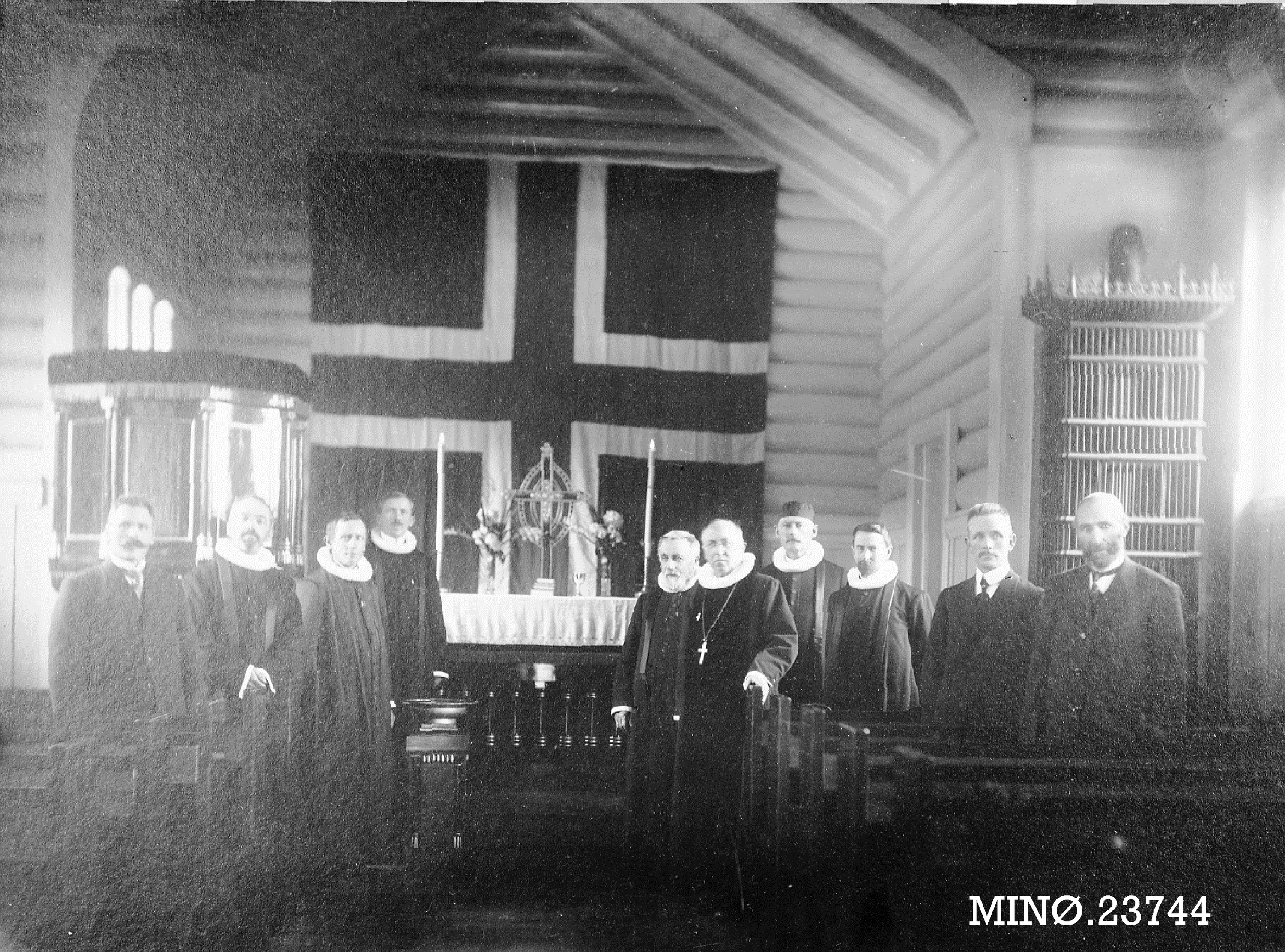

== See also ==
- List of churches in Hamar
