= Gaupne Church =

Church in Vestland, Norway

- Gaupne kyrkje
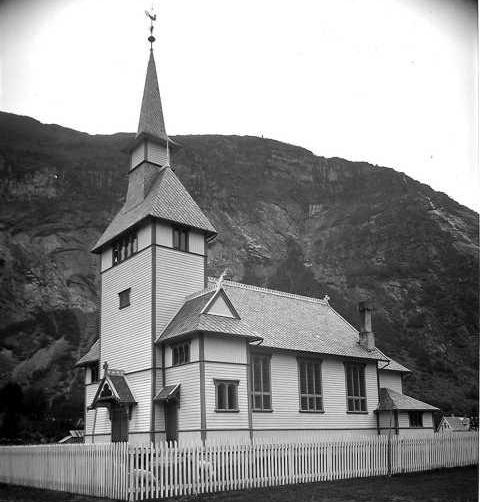
- View of the church
- Gaupne Church
- 61°24′36″N 7°17′14″E
- Location: Luster Municipality, Vestland
- Country: Norway
- Denomination: Church of Norway
- Churchmanship: Evangelical Lutheran

History
- Status: Parish church
- Founded: 1907
- Consecrated: 29 August 1907

Architecture
- Functional status: Active
- Architect: Hans Jacob Sparre
- Architectural type: Long church
- Completed: 1907 (119 years ago)

Specifications
- Capacity: 230
- Materials: Wood

Administration
- Diocese: Bjørgvin bispedømme
- Deanery: Sogn prosti
- Parish: Gaupne
- Norwegian Cultural Heritage Site
- Type: Church
- Status: Listed
- ID: 84095

Gaupne Church (Norwegian: Gaupne kyrkje) is a parish church of the Church of Norway in Luster Municipality in Vestland county, Norway. It is located in the village of Gaupne. It is the church for the Gaupne parish which is part of the Sogn prosti (deanery) in the Diocese of Bjørgvin. The yellow, wooden church was built in a long church design in 1907 using plans drawn up by the architect Hans Jacob Sparre. The church seats about 230 people.

== History ==
In the 1890s, the Old Gaupne Church reached the point where it was no longer usable as the main church for the parish. A discussion was held on whether to replace the church or expand and renovate it. It was eventually decided to build a new wooden long church about 460 metres (1,510 ft) to the northwest of the old church. The parish hired Hans Jacob Sparre to design the new church and Anders Korsvold was hired as the lead builder. Construction began late in 1905 and the new building was consecrated on 29 August 1907. The old church was turned into a museum and it was taken over by the Society for the Preservation of Ancient Norwegian Monuments in 1909.

== See also ==
- List of churches in Bjørgvin
