= Luster Municipality =

Municipality in Vestland, Norway

Luster Municipality Luster kommune
- Municipality
- Lyster herred (historic name)
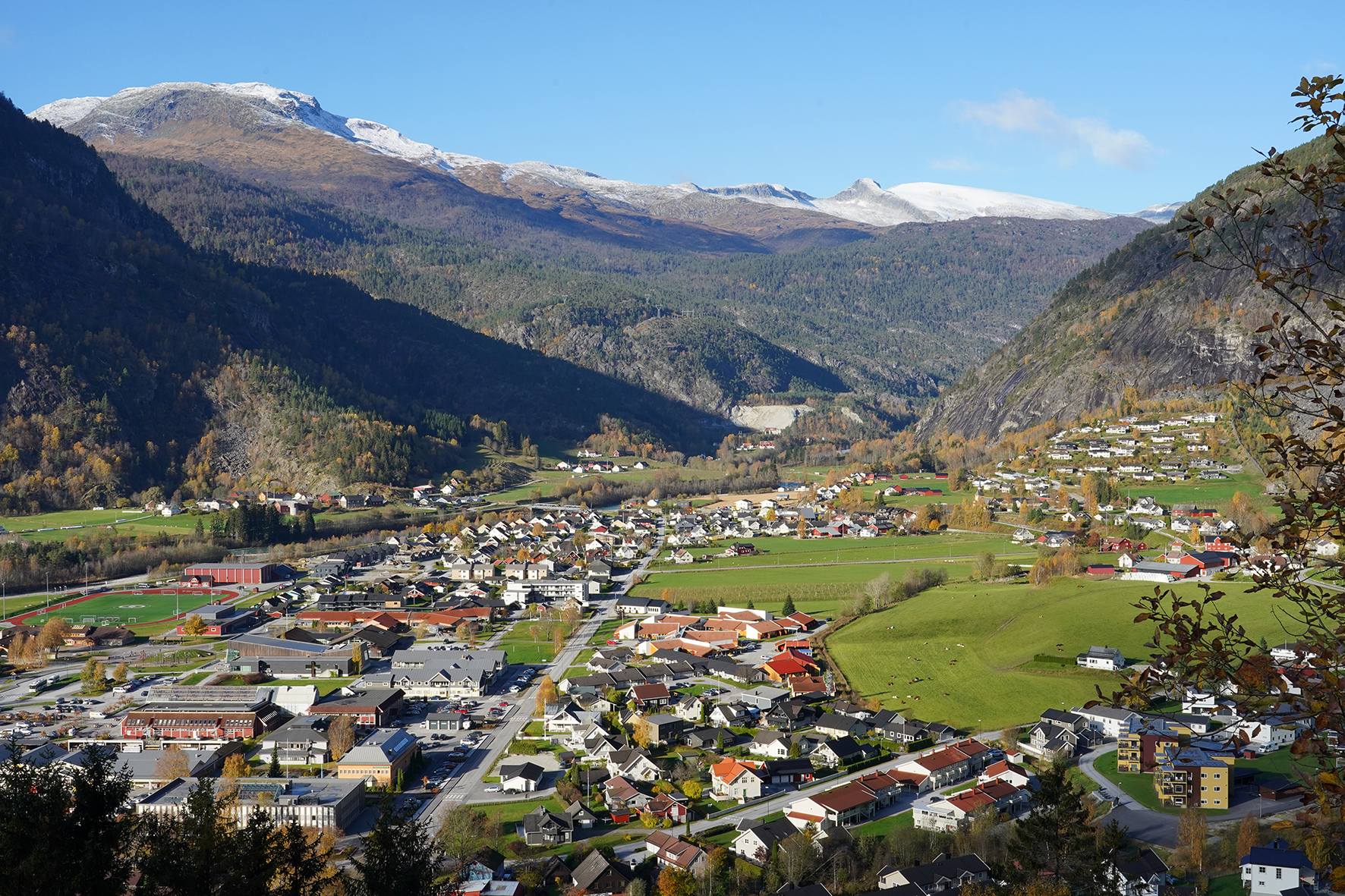
- View of the village of Gaupne

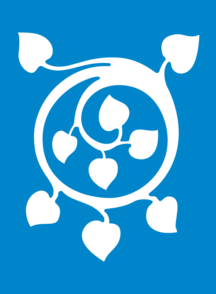
- Flag Coat of arms

- Vestland within Norway

- Luster within Vestland
- Coordinates: 61°29′38″N 07°19′46″E
- Country: Norway
- County: Vestland
- District: Sogn
- Established: 1 Jan 1838
  - Created as: Formannskapsdistrikt
- Administrative centre: Gaupne

Government
  - Mayor (2023): Andreas Wollnick Wiese (Sp)

Area
  - Total: 2,706.35 km^{2} (1,044.93 sq mi)
  - Land: 2,596.82 km^{2} (1,002.64 sq mi)
  - Water: 109.53 km^{2} (42.29 sq mi) 4%
  - Rank: #17 in Norway
- Highest elevation: 2,403.77 m (7,886.4 ft)

Population (2025)
  - Total: 5,432
  - Rank: #177 in Norway
  - Density: 2/km^{2} (5.2/sq mi)
  - Change (10 years): ▲ +5.5%
- Demonym: Lustring

Official language
  - Norwegian form: Nynorsk
- Time zone: UTC+01:00 (CET)
  - Summer (DST): UTC+02:00 (CEST)
- ISO 3166 code: NO-4644
- Website: Official website

Luster is a municipality in Vestland county, Norway. It is located at the end of the Sognefjorden in the traditional district of Sogn. The administrative centre is the village of Gaupne. Other villages in Luster include Fortun, Hafslo, Indre Hafslo, Jostedal, Luster, Nes, Ornes, Skjolden, Solvorn, and Veitastrond.

Luster is centered around the inner branch of the Sognefjord, which is called the Lustrafjorden. Its landscape includes fjords, steep mountains, water-abundant waterfalls, blue glaciers, and valleys. Both Jostedalsbreen National Park and Breheimen National Park are partially located in this municipality. The Sognefjellsvegen road goes over a mountain pass in eastern Luster.

The 2,706.35-square-kilometre (1,044.93 sq mi) municipality is the 17th largest by area out of the 357 municipalities in Norway. Luster Municipality is the 177th most populous municipality in Norway with a population of 5,432. The municipality's population density is 2 inhabitants per square kilometre (5.2/sq mi) and its population has increased by 5.5% during the previous 10-year period.

In 2016, the chief of police for Vestlandet formally suggested a reconfiguration of police districts and stations. He proposed that the police station in Luster be closed.

== General information ==
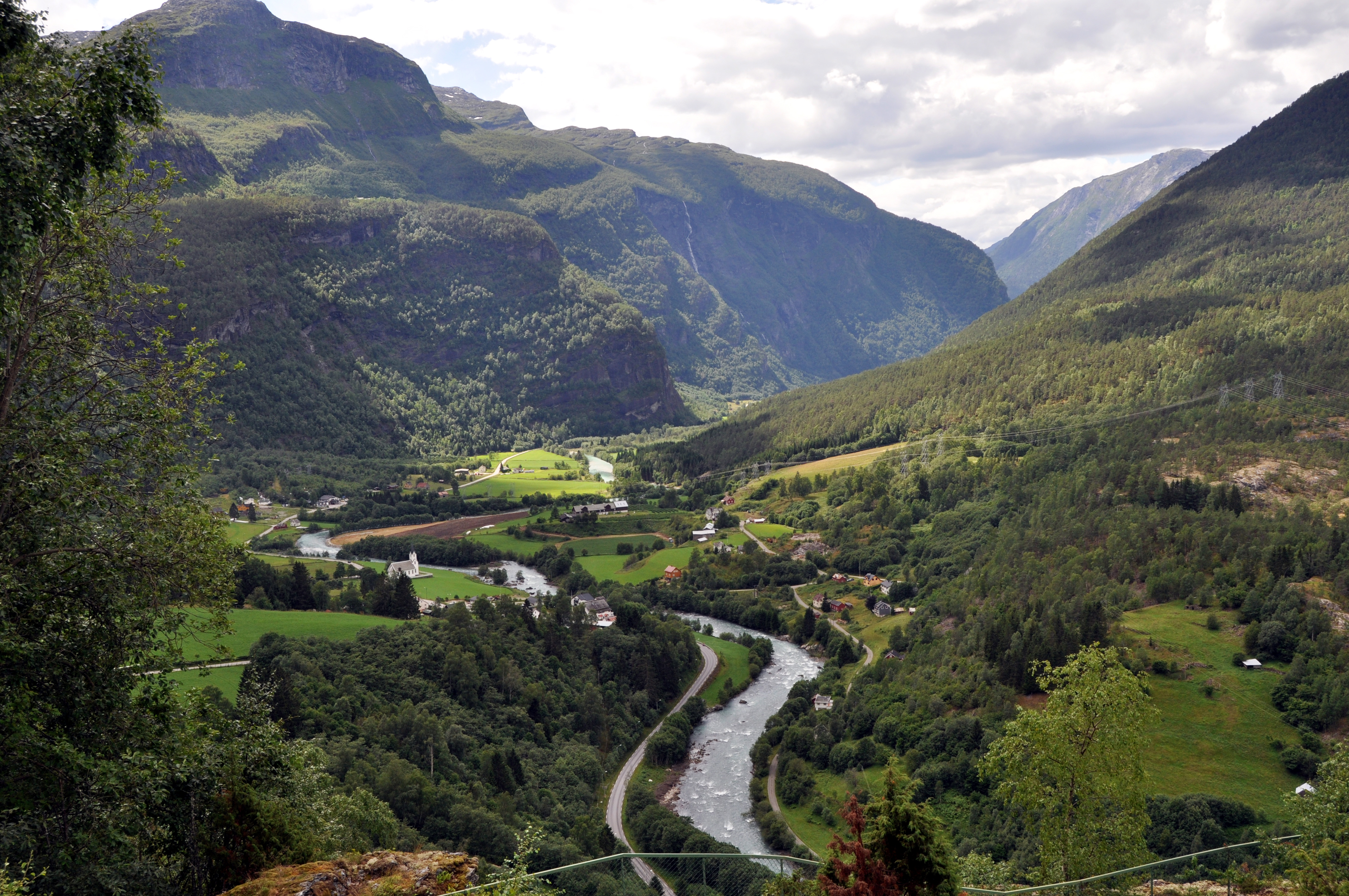
View of the Fortun area

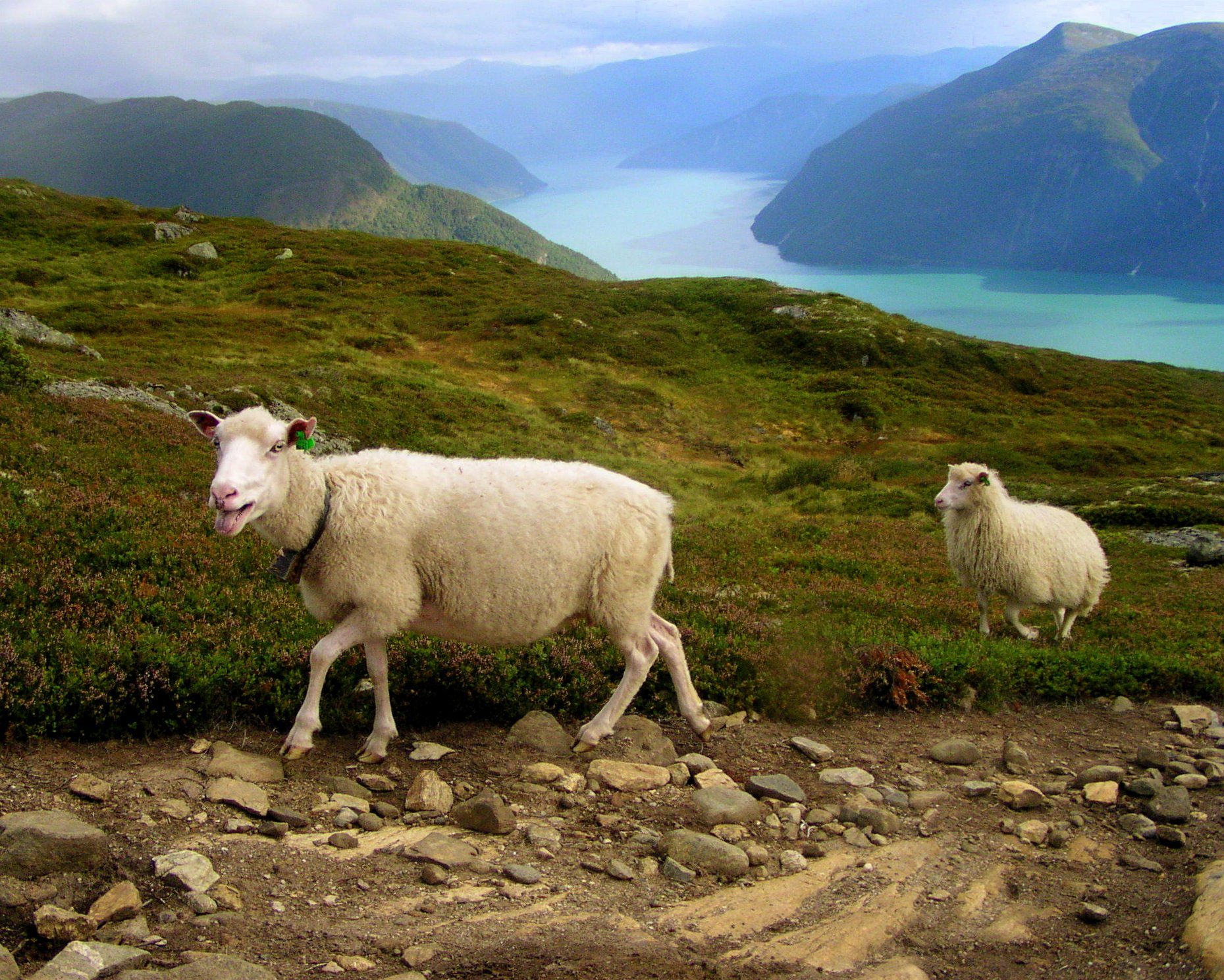
Norwegian sheep and Luster landscape

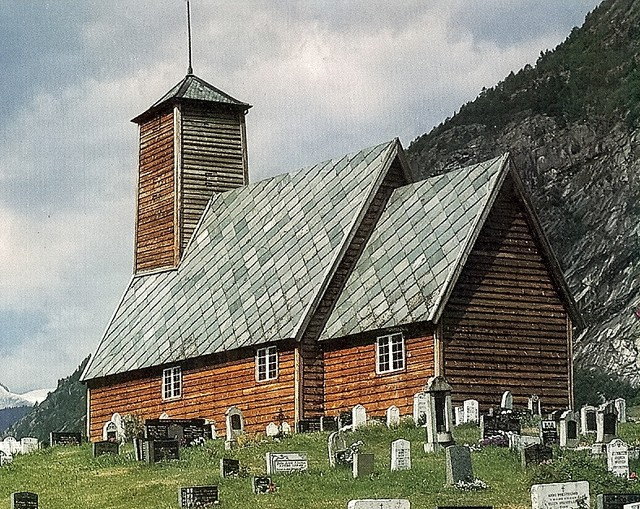
Old Gaupne Church

The parish of Lyster was established as a municipality on 1 January 1838 (see formannskapsdistrikt law). The original municipality was identical to the Church of Norway's Lyster prestegjeld with the parishes (sokn) of Fortun, Dale, Nes, and Gaupne.

During the 1960s, there were many municipal mergers across Norway due to the work of the Schei Committee. On 1 January 1963, Luster Municipality (population: 2,674) was merged with Hafslo Municipality (population: 2,384) and Jostedal Municipality (population: 796) forming a new, much larger Luster Municipality with 5,854 residents. Since the consolidation of the three municipalities of Hafslo, Jostedal, and Luster in 1963, the area has been characterized by scattered rural settlements and large distances between these settlements. Luster Municipality was the largest municipality by area in the old Sogn og Fjordane county.

Historically, this municipality was part of the old Sogn og Fjordane county. On 1 January 2020, the municipality became a part of the newly-formed Vestland county (after Hordaland and Sogn og Fjordane counties were merged).

=== Name ===
The municipality (originally the parish) is named after the Lustrafjorden (Old Norse: Lústr) and the village of Luster which grew up along the fjord. The name is derived from the word ljóss which means "light" or "bright", referring to the bright color of the water from the glaciers.

Historically, the name of the municipality was spelled Lyster. On 3 November 1917, a royal resolution changed the spelling of the name of the municipality to Luster.

=== Coat of arms ===
The coat of arms was granted on 20 April 1990. The official blazon is "Azure, a tilia curled argent forming an annulet" (Norwegian: På blå grunn ein sølv linderanke lagt i sirkel). This means the arms have a blue field (background) and the charge is a tilia branch curled into a circle. The charge has a tincture of argent which means it is commonly colored white, but if it is made out of metal, then silver is used. The arms are inspired by an old woodcarving found in the Urnes Stave Church which is located in the municipality. The arms were designed by Inge Rotevatn from Nordfjordeid. The municipal flag has the same design as the coat of arms.

=== Churches ===
The Church of Norway has eight parishes (sokn) within Luster Municipality. It is part of the Sogn prosti (deanery) in the Diocese of Bjørgvin.

Churches in Luster Municipality
Parish (sokn)	Church name	Location of the church	Year built
Dale	Dale Church	Luster	1250
Fet og Joranger	Fet Church	Fet	1894
Fet og Joranger	Joranger Church	Joranger	1660
Fortun	Fortun Church	Fortun	1879
Gaupne	Gaupne Church	Gaupne	1908
Gaupne	Old Gaupne Church	Gaupne	1647
Hafslo	Hafslo Church	Hafslo	1878
Hafslo	Veitastrond Chapel	Veitastrond	1928
Jostedal	Jostedal Church	Jostedal	1660
Nes	Nes Church	Nes	1909
Solvorn	Solvorn Church	Solvorn	1883
Solvorn	Urnes Stave Church	Ornes	1130

== Government ==
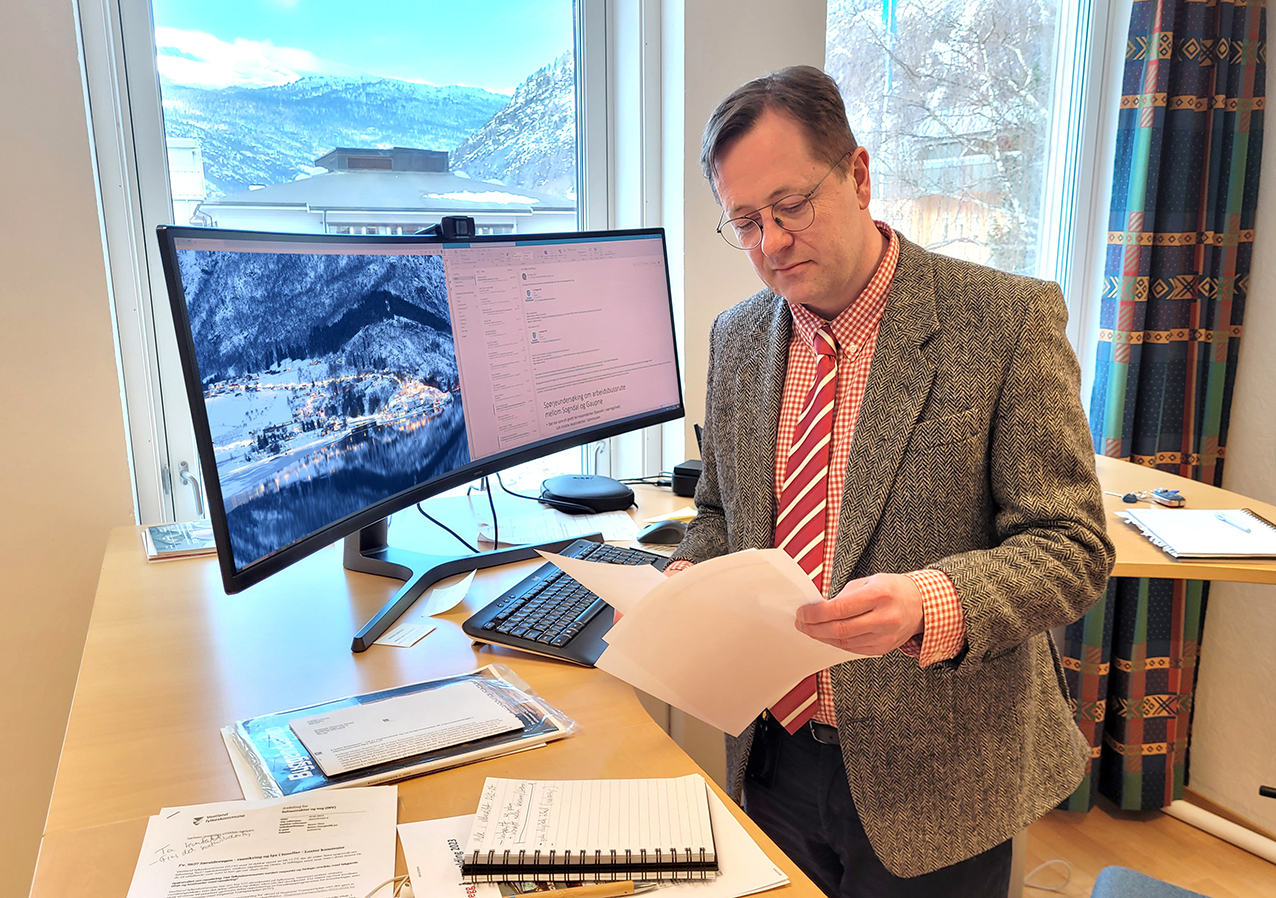
Mayor Andreas Wollnick Wiese (2024)

Luster Municipality is responsible for primary education (through 10th grade), outpatient health services, senior citizen services, welfare and other social services, zoning, economic development, and municipal roads and utilities. The municipality is governed by a municipal council of directly elected representatives. The mayor is indirectly elected by a vote of the municipal council. The municipality is under the jurisdiction of the Sogn og Fjordane District Court and the Gulating Court of Appeal.

=== Municipal council ===
The municipal council (Kommunestyre) of Luster Municipality is made up of 25 representatives that are elected to four year terms. The tables below show the current and historical composition of the council by political party.

Luster kommunestyre 2023–2027
Party name (in Nynorsk)	Number of representatives
Labour Party (Arbeidarpartiet)	8
Progress Party (Framstegspartiet)	1
Conservative Party (Høgre)	3
Christian Democratic Party (Kristeleg Folkeparti)	2
Centre Party (Senterpartiet)	9
Socialist Left Party (Sosialistisk Venstreparti)	1
Liberal Party (Venstre)	1
Total number of members:	25

Luster kommunestyre 2019–2023
Party name (in Nynorsk)	Number of representatives
Labour Party (Arbeidarpartiet)	6
Progress Party (Framstegspartiet)	1
Conservative Party (Høgre)	3
Christian Democratic Party (Kristeleg Folkeparti)	1
Centre Party (Senterpartiet)	13
Liberal Party (Venstre)	1
Total number of members:	25

Luster kommunestyre 2015–2019
Party name (in Nynorsk)	Number of representatives
Labour Party (Arbeidarpartiet)	7
Progress Party (Framstegspartiet)	1
Conservative Party (Høgre)	2
Christian Democratic Party (Kristeleg Folkeparti)	1
Centre Party (Senterpartiet)	13
Liberal Party (Venstre)	1
Total number of members:	25

Luster kommunestyre 2011–2015
Party name (in Nynorsk)	Number of representatives
Labour Party (Arbeidarpartiet)	8
Progress Party (Framstegspartiet)	3
Conservative Party (Høgre)	3
Christian Democratic Party (Kristeleg Folkeparti)	2
Centre Party (Senterpartiet)	7
Liberal Party (Venstre)	2
Total number of members:	25

Luster kommunestyre 2007–2011
Party name (in Nynorsk)	Number of representatives
Labour Party (Arbeidarpartiet)	10
Progress Party (Framstegspartiet)	3
Conservative Party (Høgre)	2
Christian Democratic Party (Kristeleg Folkeparti)	4
Centre Party (Senterpartiet)	7
Socialist Left Party (Sosialistisk Venstreparti)	1
Liberal Party (Venstre)	2
Total number of members:	29

Luster kommunestyre 2003–2007
Party name (in Nynorsk)	Number of representatives
Labour Party (Arbeidarpartiet)	12
Progress Party (Framstegspartiet)	3
Conservative Party (Høgre)	1
Christian Democratic Party (Kristeleg Folkeparti)	4
Centre Party (Senterpartiet)	6
Socialist Left Party (Sosialistisk Venstreparti)	1
Liberal Party (Venstre)	2
Total number of members:	29

Luster kommunestyre 1999–2003
Party name (in Nynorsk)	Number of representatives
Labour Party (Arbeidarpartiet)	17
Liberal Party (Venstre)	1
Joint list of the Conservative Party (Høgre), Christian Democratic Party (Kristeleg Folkeparti), and Centre Party (Senterpartiet)	11
Total number of members:	29

Luster kommunestyre 1995–1999
Party name (in Nynorsk)	Number of representatives
Labour Party (Arbeidarpartiet)	15
Conservative Party (Høgre)	1
Christian Democratic Party (Kristeleg Folkeparti)	4
Centre Party (Senterpartiet)	7
Liberal Party (Venstre)	2
Total number of members:	29

Luster kommunestyre 1991–1995
Party name (in Nynorsk)	Number of representatives
Labour Party (Arbeidarpartiet)	18
Conservative Party (Høgre)	2
Christian Democratic Party (Kristeleg Folkeparti)	5
Centre Party (Senterpartiet)	10
Liberal Party (Venstre)	1
Local list for Hafslo (Bygdalista for Hafslo)	1
Total number of members:	37

Luster kommunestyre 1987–1991
Party name (in Nynorsk)	Number of representatives
Labour Party (Arbeidarpartiet)	16
Conservative Party (Høgre)	3
Christian Democratic Party (Kristeleg Folkeparti)	5
Centre Party (Senterpartiet)	9
Liberal Party (Venstre)	2
Local list for Hafslo (Bygdalista for Hafslo)	2
Total number of members:	37

Luster kommunestyre 1983–1987
Party name (in Nynorsk)	Number of representatives
Labour Party (Arbeidarpartiet)	16
Conservative Party (Høgre)	4
Christian Democratic Party (Kristeleg Folkeparti)	5
Centre Party (Senterpartiet)	7
Liberal Party (Venstre)	2
Local list for Hafslo (Bygdalista for Hafslo)	3
Total number of members:	37

Luster kommunestyre 1979–1983
Party name (in Nynorsk)	Number of representatives
Labour Party (Arbeidarpartiet)	14
Conservative Party (Høgre)	3
Christian Democratic Party (Kristeleg Folkeparti)	6
Centre Party (Senterpartiet)	9
Liberal Party (Venstre)	2
Local list for Hafslo (Bygdalista for Hafslo)	3
Total number of members:	37

Luster kommunestyre 1975–1979
Party name (in Nynorsk)	Number of representatives
Labour Party (Arbeidarpartiet)	17
Conservative Party (Høgre)	1
Christian Democratic Party (Kristeleg Folkeparti)	6
Centre Party (Senterpartiet)	10
Liberal Party (Venstre)	1
Cross-party common list (Tverrpolitisk Samlingsliste)	2
Total number of members:	37

Luster kommunestyre 1971–1975
Party name (in Nynorsk)	Number of representatives
Labour Party (Arbeidarpartiet)	16
Conservative Party (Høgre)	1
Christian Democratic Party (Kristeleg Folkeparti)	6
Centre Party (Senterpartiet)	9
Liberal Party (Venstre)	3
Joint List(s) of Non-Socialist Parties (Borgarlege Felleslister)	2
Total number of members:	37

Luster kommunestyre 1967–1971
Party name (in Nynorsk)	Number of representatives
Labour Party (Arbeidarpartiet)	15
Conservative Party (Høgre)	1
Christian Democratic Party (Kristeleg Folkeparti)	5
Centre Party (Senterpartiet)	9
Liberal Party (Venstre)	5
Local List(s) (Lokale lister)	2
Total number of members:	37

Luster kommunestyre 1963–1967
Party name (in Nynorsk)	Number of representatives
Labour Party (Arbeidarpartiet)	16
Joint List(s) of Non-Socialist Parties (Borgarlege Felleslister)	19
Local List(s) (Lokale lister)	2
Total number of members:	37

Luster heradsstyre 1959–1963
Party name (in Nynorsk)	Number of representatives
Labour Party (Arbeidarpartiet)	12
Conservative Party (Høgre)	1
Christian Democratic Party (Kristeleg Folkeparti)	3
Centre Party (Senterpartiet)	7
Liberal Party (Venstre)	2
Total number of members:	25
Note: On 1 January 1963, Hafslo Municipality and Jostedal Municipality both became part of Luster Municipality.

Luster heradsstyre 1955–1959
Party name (in Nynorsk)	Number of representatives
Labour Party (Arbeidarpartiet)	11
Conservative Party (Høgre)	1
Christian Democratic Party (Kristeleg Folkeparti)	4
Farmers' Party (Bondepartiet)	7
Liberal Party (Venstre)	2
Total number of members:	25

Luster heradsstyre 1951–1955
Party name (in Nynorsk)	Number of representatives
Labour Party (Arbeidarpartiet)	17
Liberal Party (Venstre)	7
Joint List(s) of Non-Socialist Parties (Borgarlege Felleslister)	12
Total number of members:	36

Luster heradsstyre 1947–1951
Party name (in Nynorsk)	Number of representatives
Labour Party (Arbeidarpartiet)	16
Farmers' Party (Bondepartiet)	6
Liberal Party (Venstre)	3
Joint List(s) of Non-Socialist Parties (Borgarlege Felleslister)	10
Local List(s) (Lokale lister)	1
Total number of members:	36

Luster heradsstyre 1945–1947
Party name (in Nynorsk)	Number of representatives
Labour Party (Arbeidarpartiet)	6
List of workers, fishermen, and small farmholders (Arbeidarar, fiskarar, småbrukarar liste)	11
Joint List(s) of Non-Socialist Parties (Borgarlege Felleslister)	8
Local List(s) (Lokale lister)	11
Total number of members:	36

Luster heradsstyre 1937–1941*
Party name (in Nynorsk)	Number of representatives
Labour Party (Arbeidarpartiet)	18
Farmers' Party (Bondepartiet)	7
Liberal Party (Venstre)	2
Joint list of the Farmers' Party (Bondepartiet) and the Liberal Party (Venstre)	6
Joint List(s) of Non-Socialist Parties (Borgarlege Felleslister)	2
Local List(s) (Lokale lister)	1
Total number of members:	36
Note: Due to the German occupation of Norway during World War II, no elections were held for new municipal councils until after the war ended in 1945.

=== Mayors ===
The mayor (Nynorsk: ordførar) of Luster Municipality is the political leader of the municipality and the chairperson of the municipal council. Here is a list of people who have held this position:

- 1838–1841: Mons S. Fuhr
- 1842–1843: Peder Lavold
- 1844–1845: Hans Hanson Urdahl, Sr.
- 1846–1853: Sølfest Urdahl
- 1854–1861: Mons S. Fuhr
- 1862–1863: Hans Hanson Urdahl, Sr.
- 1864–1865: John Z. Næs
- 1866–1866: Sølfest Urdahl
- 1867–1867: John Z. Næs
- 1868–1869: Sølfest Urdahl
- 1870–1875: John Z. Næs
- 1876–1877: Hans Hanson Urdahl, Jr.
- 1878–1881: John Z. Næs
- 1888–1893: Hans Hanson Urdahl, Jr.
- 1894–1897: Sjur O. Fuhr
- 1898–1898: Hans J. Næss
- 1899–1900: Sjur T. Næss
- 1901–1904: Sjur O. Fuhr
- 1905–1906: Sjur T. Næss
- 1907–1910: Per Urdahl
- 1911–1916: Halvard Drægni
- 1917–1919: Johannes Fladhammer
- 1920–1921: Halvard Drægni
- 1922–1922: Hermann Prestegård
- 1923–1925: Jens Døsen
- 1926–1927: Halvard Drægni
- 1928–1928: Olav Tjønn
- 1929–1931: Anders Molland
- 1932–1934: Hermann Prestegård
- 1935–1941: Anders Molland
- 1942–1944: Eirik Weka
- 1946–1947: Hans Prestegård
- 1948–1959: Olav Listou
- 1960–1975: Anders Bjørk (Sp)
- 1976–1977: Kåre Øvregard (Ap)
- 1978–1979: Knut P. Nes (KrF)
- 1980–1989: Jan Haugen (Sp)
- 1990–2003: Ernst Weum (Ap)
- 2003–2011: Torodd Urnes (KrF)
- 2011–2023: Ivar Kvalen (Sp)
- 2023–present: Andreas Wollnick Wiese (Sp)

== Geography ==
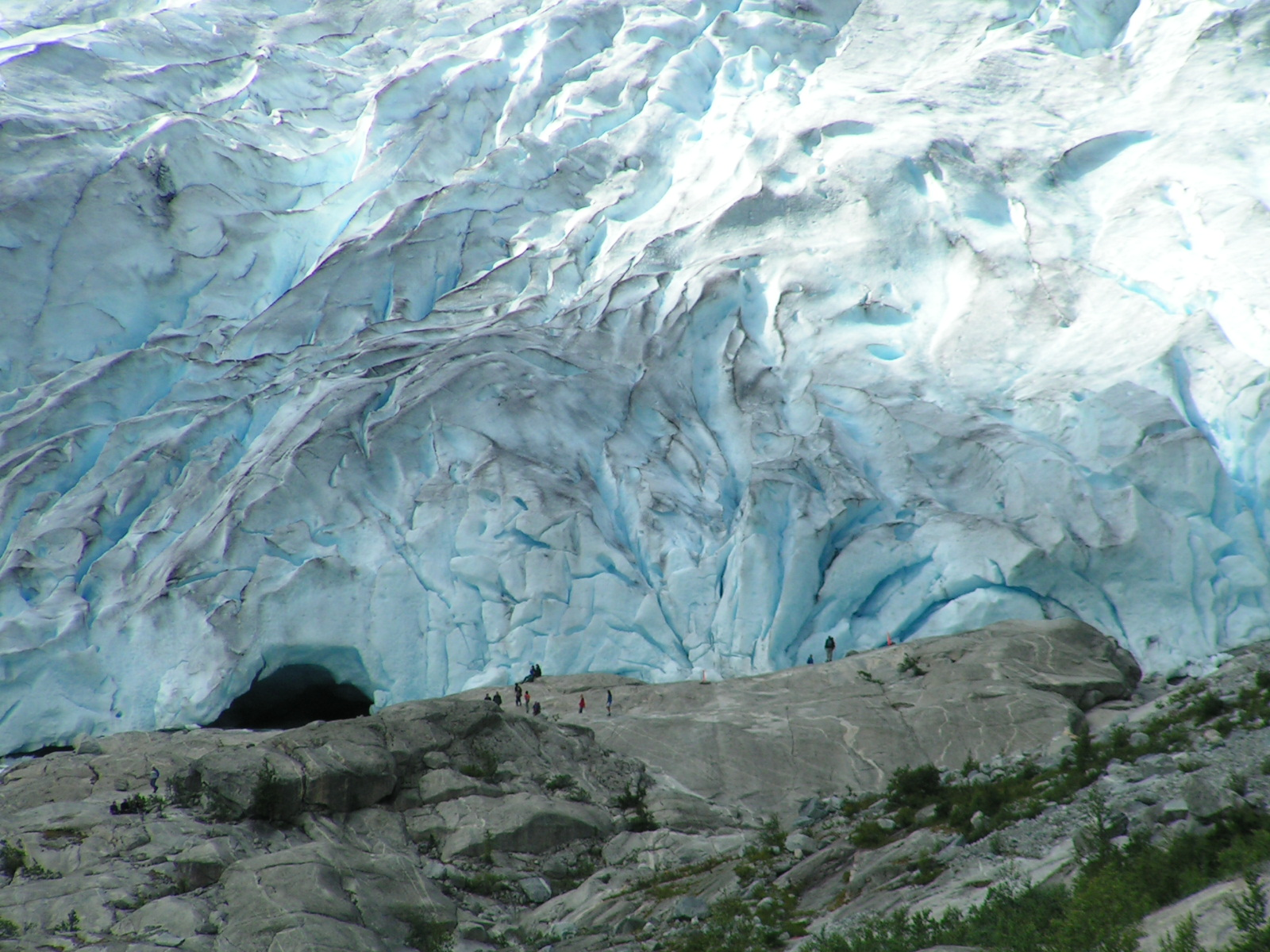
Note people entering the ice cave in the glacier Nigardsbreen—this gives some perspective on the size of the glacier as the cave shows in the other picture.

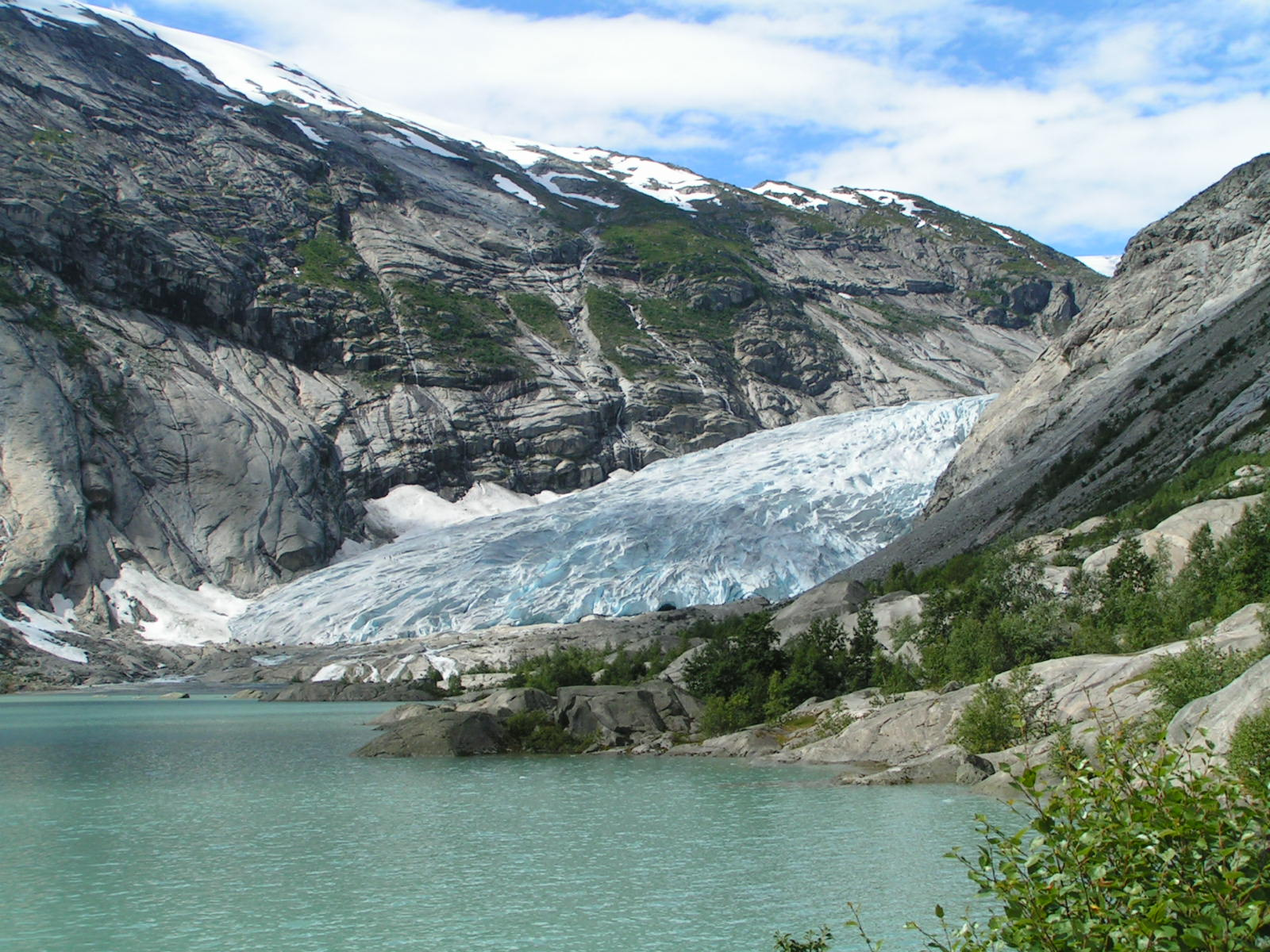
The glacier Nigardsbreen and the lake Nigardsbrevatnet in Luster.

=== Location ===
Luster, one of the largest municipalities in southern Norway, is located in the glacial mountains where the Sognefjorden begins its path to the North Sea. The fjord is fed by many large glaciers such as the Harbardsbreen, Holåbreen, Jostedalsbreen, Nigardsbreen, Spørteggbreen, and others.

It is bordered by four municipalities in Vestland county: Stryn Municipality to the north, Sunnfjord Municipality to the west, Sogndal Municipality to the southwest, and Årdal Municipality to the southeast. It is also bordered by three municipalities in Innlandet county: Skjåk Municipality to the northeast and by Lom Municipality and Vang Municipality to the east.

=== Feigumfoss waterfall ===
With a vertical drop of 218 metres (715 ft), the Feigumfoss Waterfall is one of the highest in Scandinavia.

=== Mountains ===
The Hurrungane, Breheimen, and Jotunheimen mountains cover parts of the municipality. The highest point in the municipality is the 2,403.77-metre (7,886.4 ft) tall mountain Storen. Storen is also the third highest mountain peak in Norway and it is located on the southern border of Luster Municipality and Årdal Municipality. It is part of the Hurrungane mountain range which contains some of the most alpine peaks in Norway.

Mountains of Luster over 2,000 metres (6,600 ft)
Mountain	Height	Mountain	Height
Storen	2,405 m (7,890 ft)	Store Dyrhaugstinden	2,147 m (7,044 ft)
Styggedalstindane	2,387 m (7,831 ft)	Mjølkedalstinden	2,137 m (7,011 ft)
Gjertvasstinden	2,351 m (7,713 ft)	Store Ringstind	2,124 m (6,969 ft)
Sentraltind	2,351 m (7,713 ft)	Tverrådalskyrkja	2,088 m (6,850 ft)
Vetle Skagastølstindane	2,340 m (7,680 ft)	Lodalskåpa	2,083 m (6,834 ft)
Midtre Skagastølstindane	2,284 m (7,493 ft)	Soleibotntindane	2,083 m (6,834 ft)
Store Austanbottstind	2,203 m (7,228 ft)	Søre Dyrhaugstinden	2,072 m (6,798 ft)
Store Rauddalseggje	2,168 m (7,113 ft)	Fannaråki	2,068 m (6,785 ft)
Rauddalstindane	2,157 m (7,077 ft)	Stetinden	2,020 m (6,630 ft)
Uranostinden	2,157 m (7,077 ft)	Brenibba	2,018 m (6,621 ft)

=== Lakes and Rivers ===
There are notable lakes such as Veitastrondsvatnet, Austdalsvatnet, Styggevatnet, Tunsbergdalvatnet, Prestesteinsvatnet, and Hafslovatnet. There are also many big waterfalls such as the Feigumfoss waterfall at 218 metres (715 ft) tall. The river Jostedøla runs through the Jostedal valley and empties into the fjord at Gaupne.

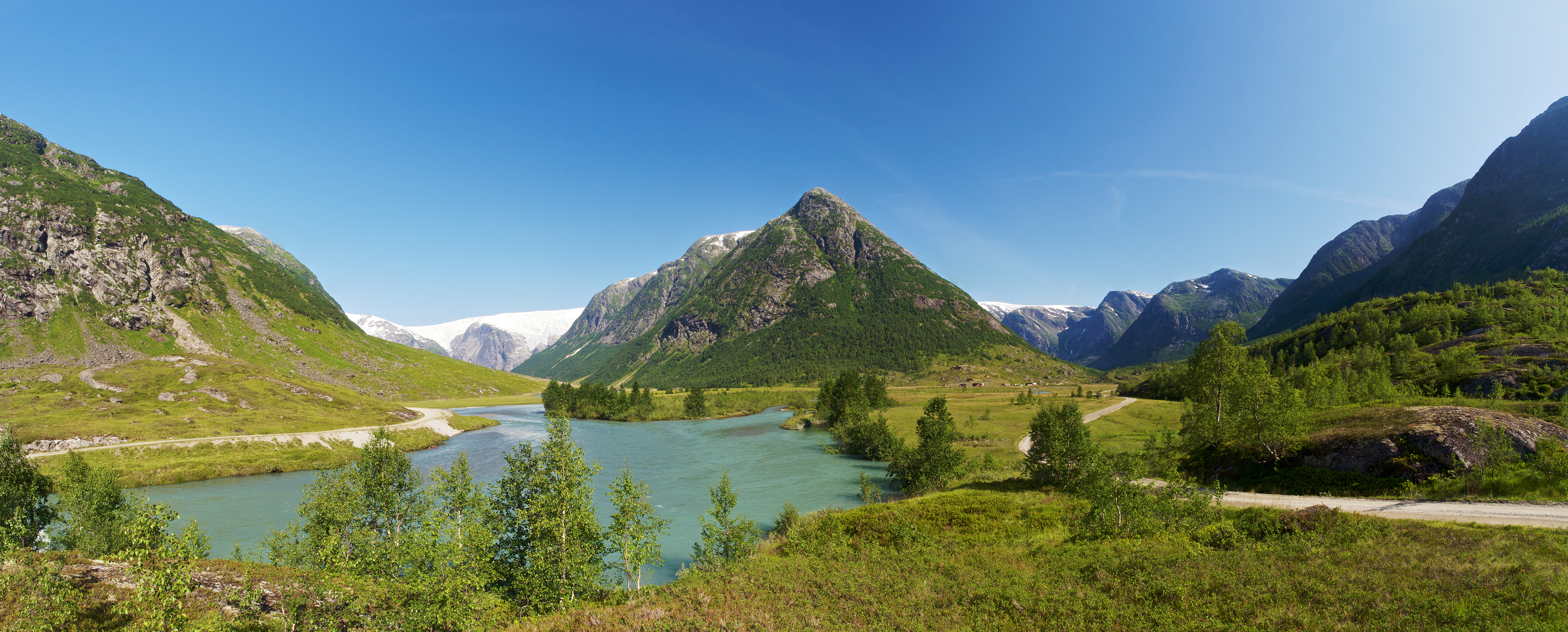
Storelvi with Austerdalen (right) and Langedalen (left)

=== Glaciers ===
The Jostedalsbreen glacier (including the arm called Nigardsbreen) is the biggest glacier in continental Europe, the highest point on it is Høgste Breakulen. It is located west of Jostedal, north of Gaupne, in Jostedalsbreen National Park, much of which is located in the municipality of Luster. Other glaciers include the Austerdalsbreen, Harbardsbreen and Spørteggbreen.

== Economy ==
The inhabitants of Luster make their living by farming, growing berries and fruit, tourism, and hydroelectricity. Jøstedal and Fortun have large hydroelectric power stations, and a 107 GWh pumped-storage plant is underway at Illvatn lake. Summer tourism is quite busy. Tourist activities include mountain climbing, skiing, fishing, hiking, and hunting. The Sognefjellsvegen tourist road passes through Luster.

=== River fishing ===
Fishing permits (for salmon fishing) are sold for use on specific rivers, including Årøy-elva.

== Culture and education ==
=== Historic churches ===
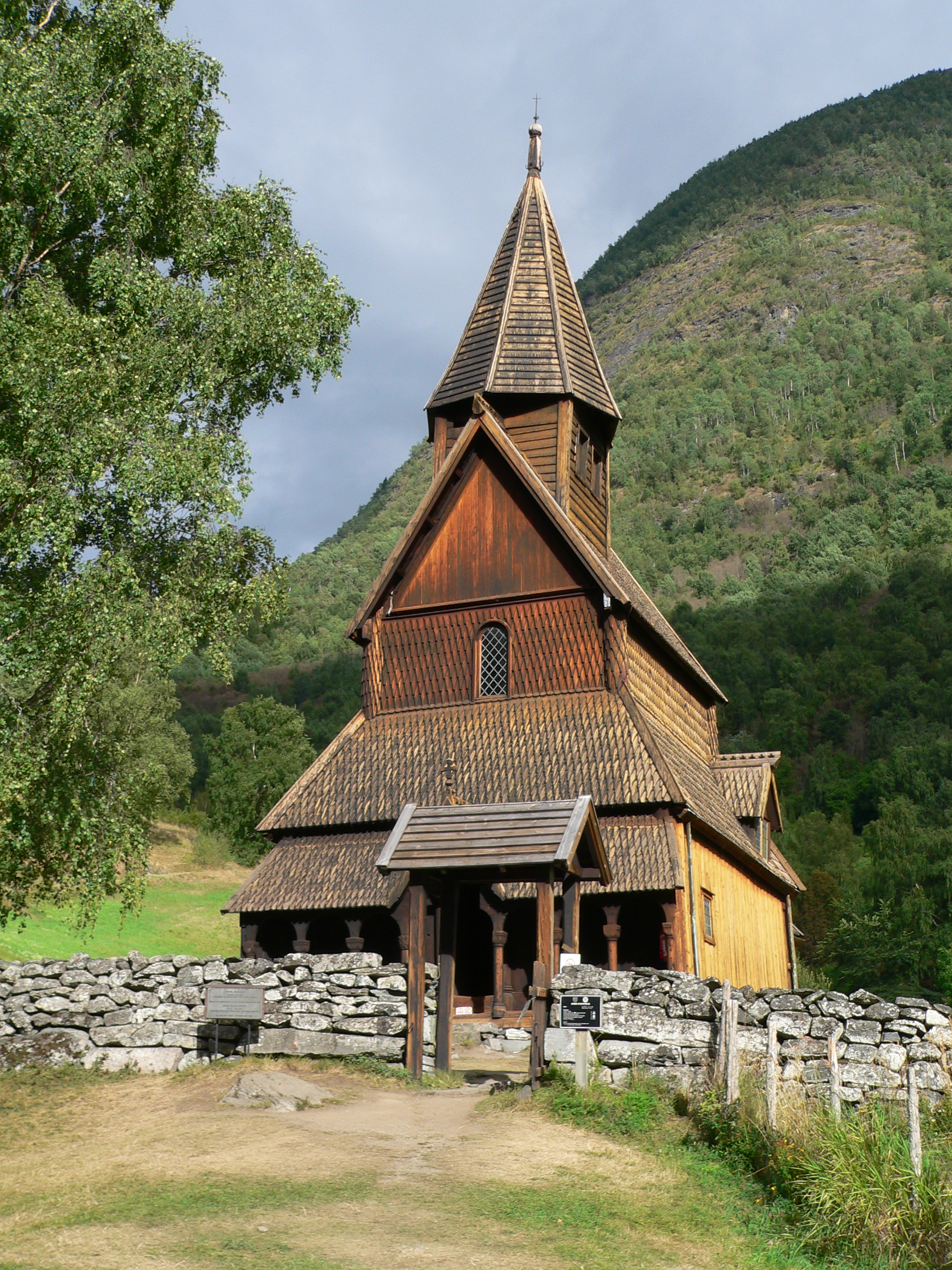
Urnes Stave Church

Urnes Stave Church

Urnes Stave Church was built around 1150 and is Norway's oldest Stave church. The Church lies majestically on the top of Urnes. The Stave church is one of four Norwegian Churches on UNESCO`s list of the most precious cultural monuments in the world.

The Stave churches are constructions of high quality, richly decorated with carvings. In virtually all of them the door frames are decorated from top to bottom with carvings. This tradition of rich ornamentation appears to go back to the animal carvings of the Viking age. The dragons are lovingly executed and transformed into long-limbed creatures of fantasy, here and there entwined with tendrils of vine, with winding stems and serrated leaves. The elaborate designs are executed with supreme artistic skill. The stave church doorways are, therefore, among the most distinctive works of art to be found in Norway. However, it is difficult to connect them with the Christian gospel.

Old Gaupne Church

The Old Gaupne Church is a magnificent church that was built in 1647 on a hill directly opposite the Gaupne village centre.

Dale Church

Dale Church is a stone church that was built in gothic style in the year 1250.

=== Breheim center ===
The Breheim Center contains a comprehensive exhibition. A journey through 20,000 years - from the Ice age to the present day, an audio/visual show takes visitors inside the glacier. Glacier boat M/S "Jostedalsrypa" crosses the Nigard Glacier Lake. There are internationally approved guides, glacier and climbing courses, and ski-trips.

=== Education ===
In 2020, 32% of the municipality's applicants for [secondary schooling] videregående skole, sought [non-vocational schooling], studiespesialisering; [67% or] the rest of the applicants sought vocational schooling.

== Notable people ==
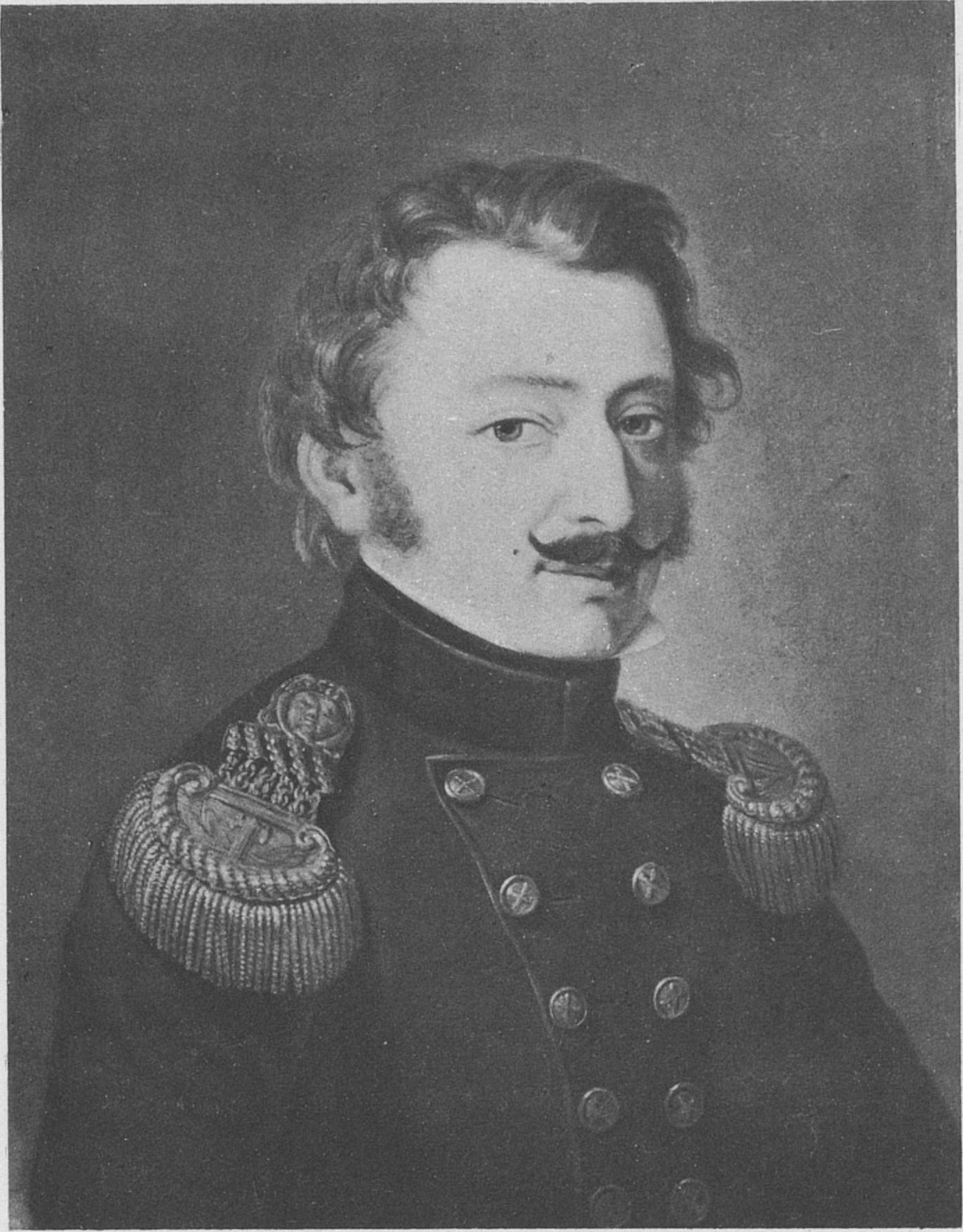
Gerhard Munthe, 1817

- Gerhard Munthe (1795 in Hafslo - 1876), a military officer, historian, and cartographer
- Christian Ellefson (1842 in Luster - 1925?), an American farmer and member of the Wisconsin State Assembly
- Peter J. Dale (1845 in Luster – 1935), a Norwegian-American member of the Wisconsin State Assembly
- Henrik Angell (1861 in Luster – 1922), a military officer, sportsman, writer, skiing pioneer, and the first Norwegian delegate to the International Olympic Committee
- Sylfest Lomheim (born 1945 in Hafslo), a philologist, academic, and politician
- Tor Bremer (born 1955 in Luster), a farmer and politician
- Kurt Heggestad (born 1982 in Veitastrond), a former professional footballer
- Stine Pettersen Reinås (born 1994 in Hafslo), a football defender with over 150 club caps and eight for the Norway women's national football team

== Twin cities/towns ==
Luster has sister city agreements with the following places:

- Viroqua, Wisconsin, United States

== Media gallery ==
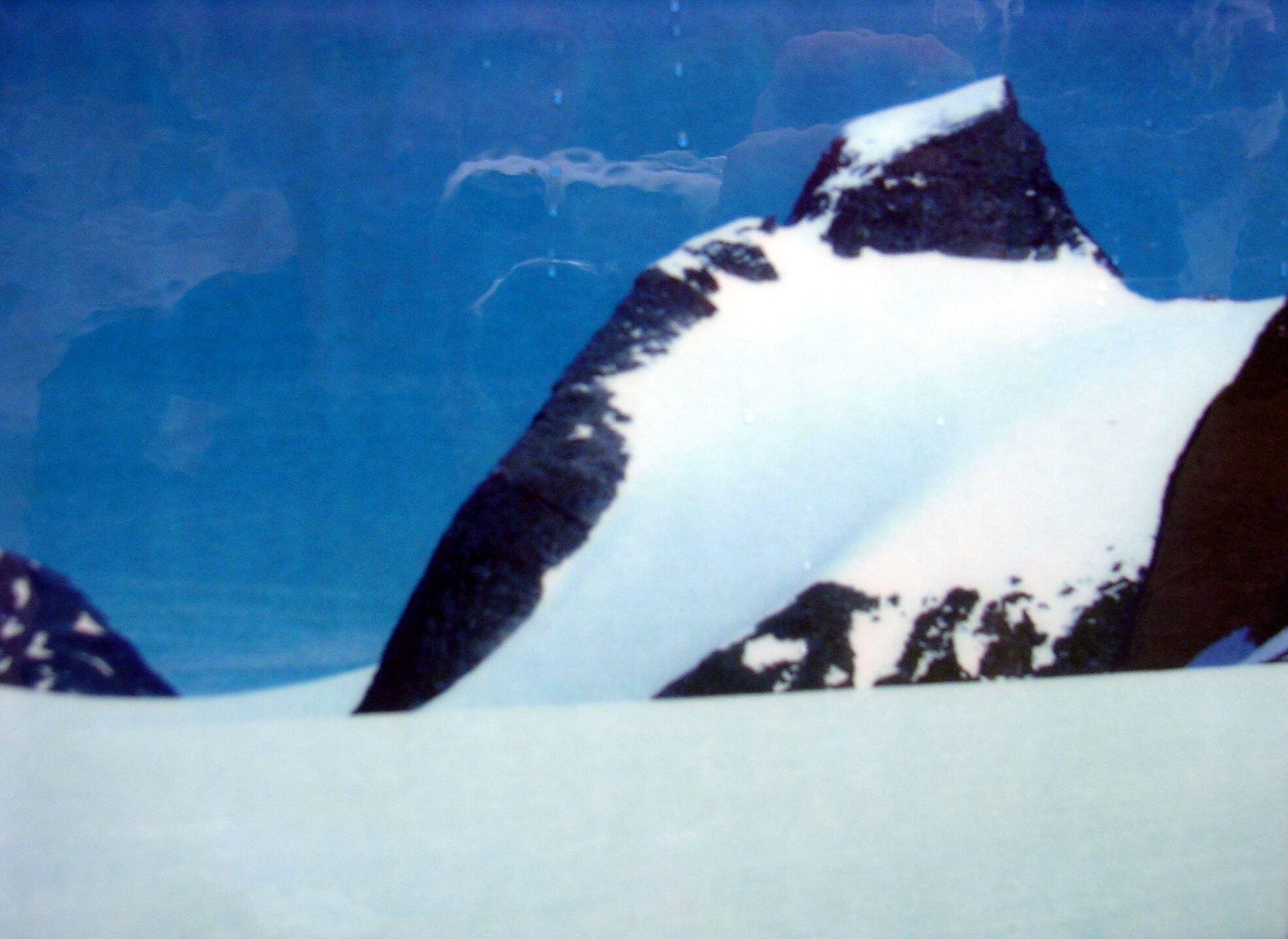
Lodalskåpa, a peak in the northeast part of Jostedalsbreen

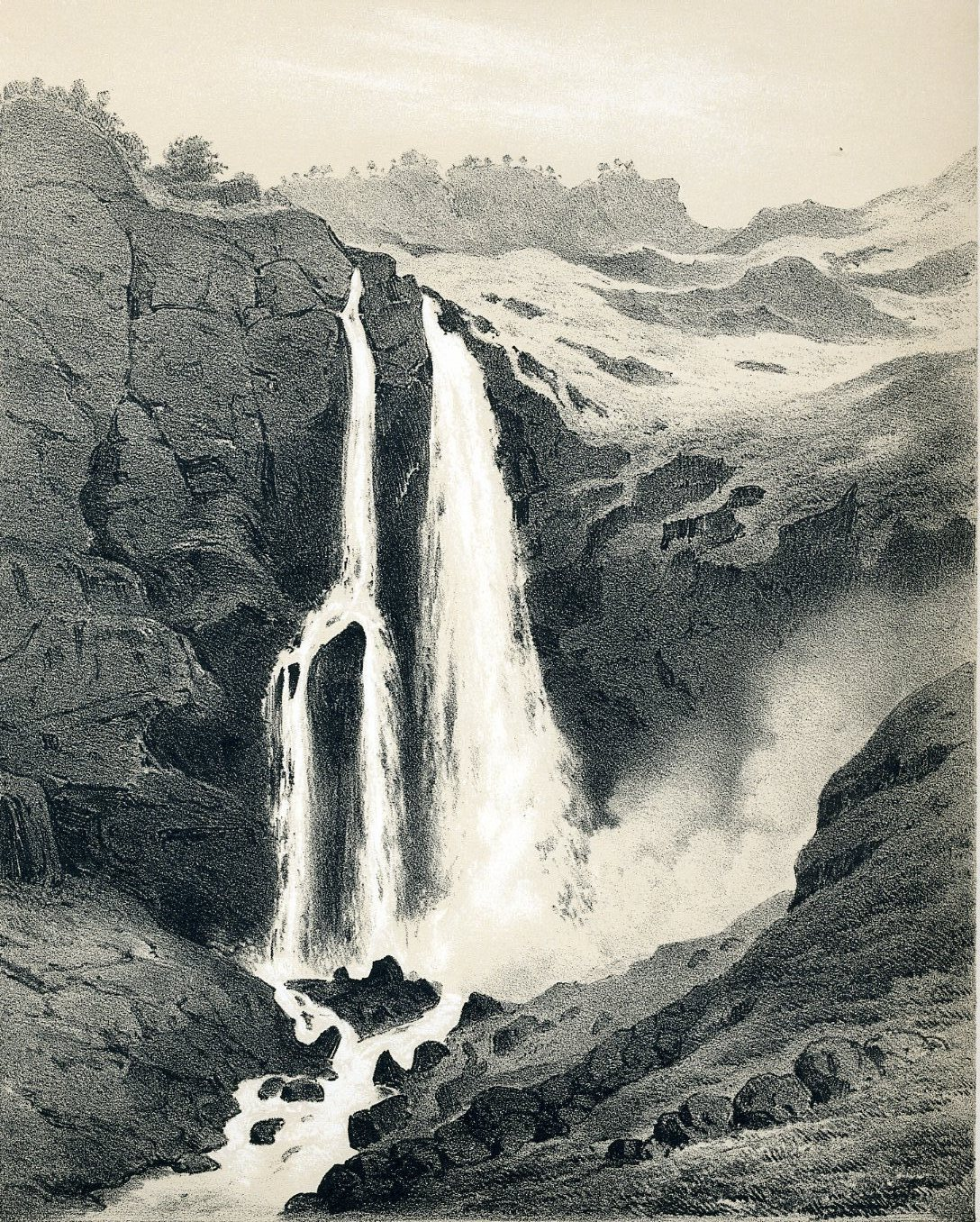
Feigumfossen

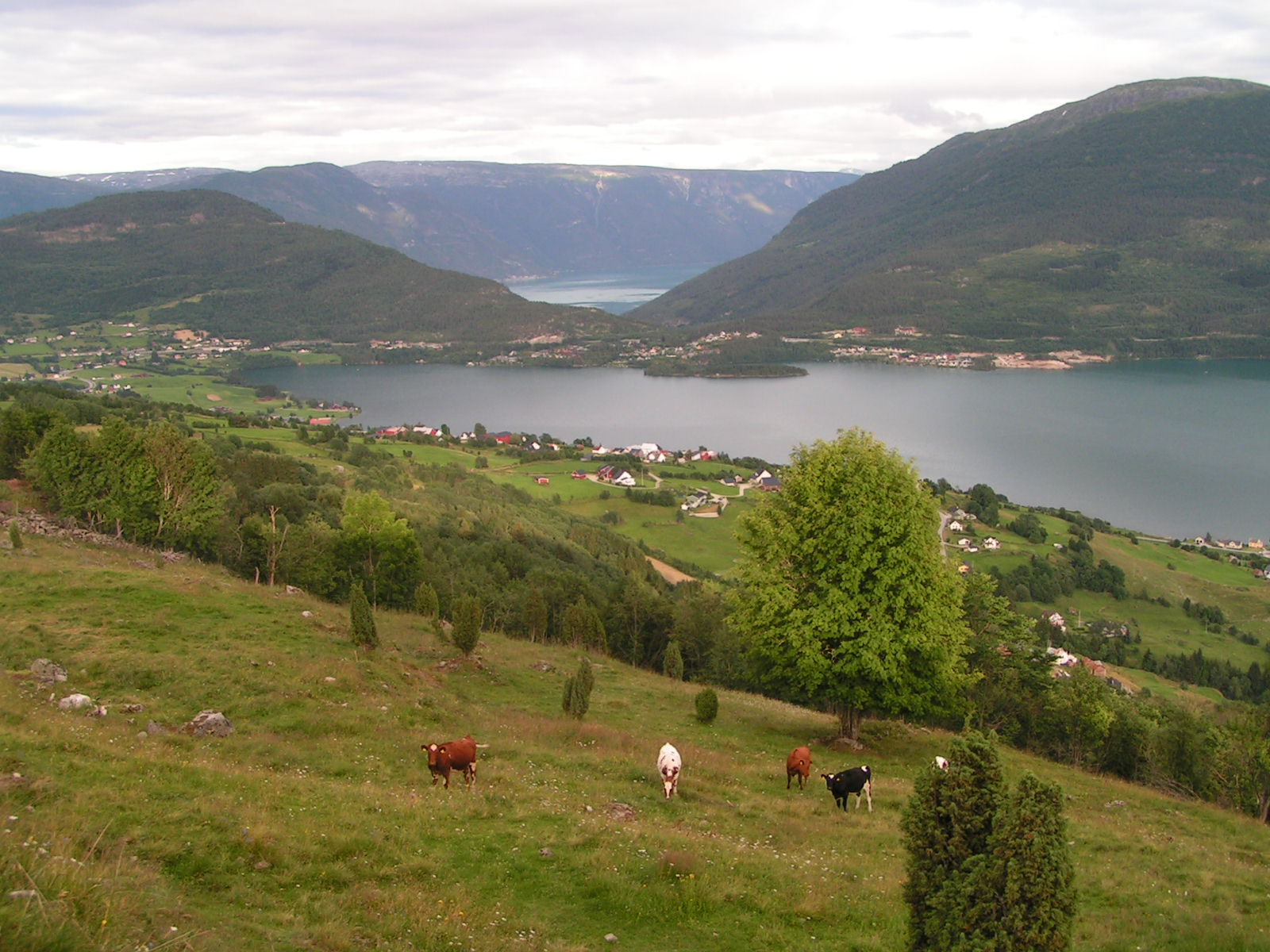
Hafslovatnet lake with the Sognefjord in the background

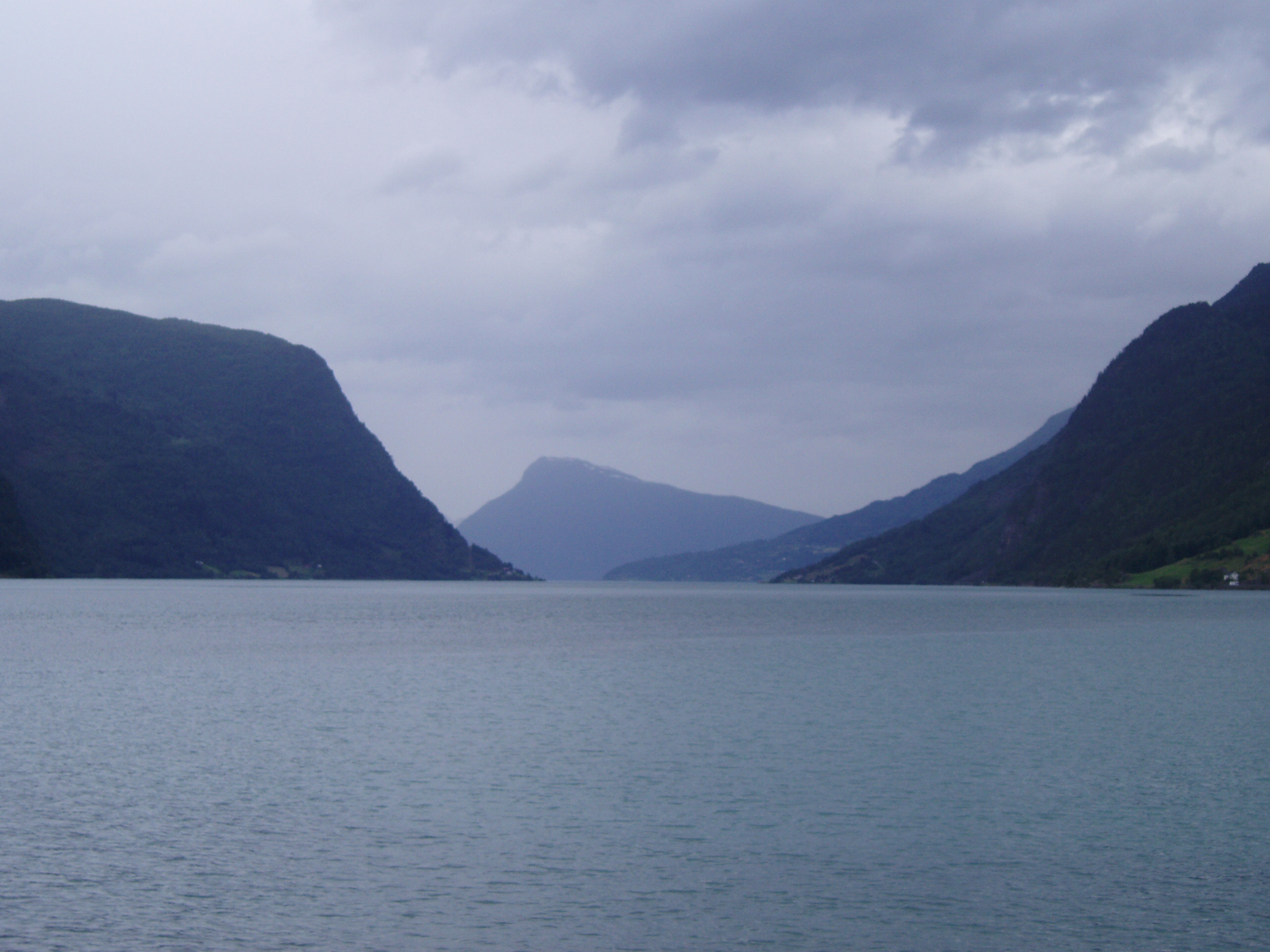
Lustrafjorden

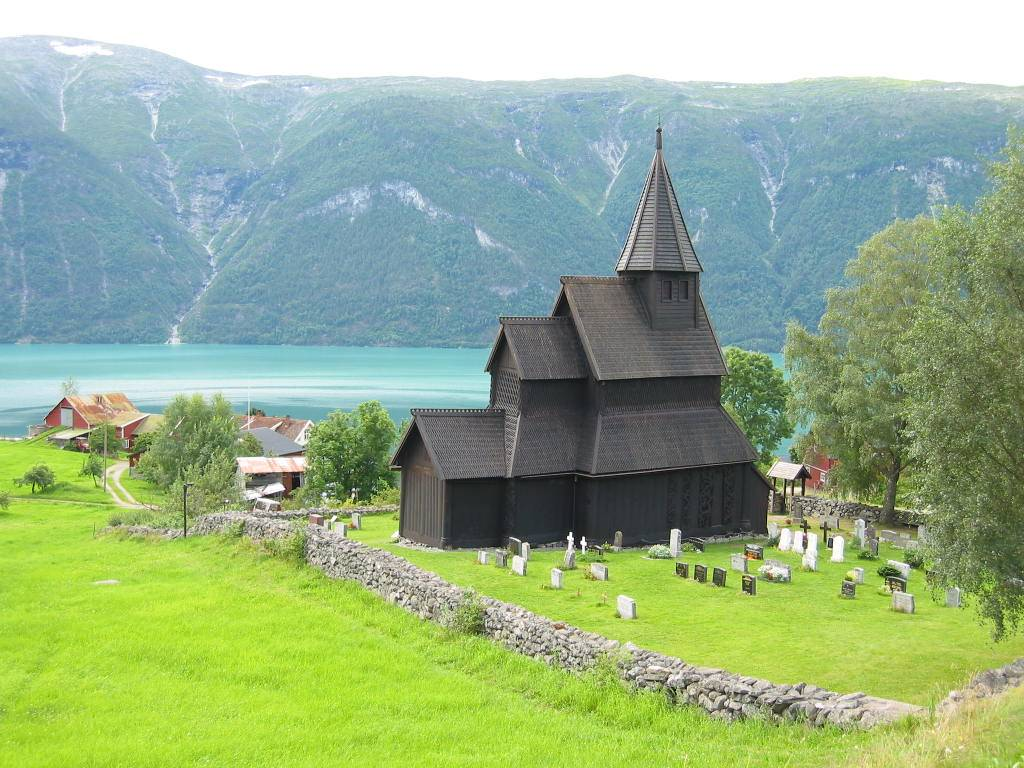
Urnes Stave Church

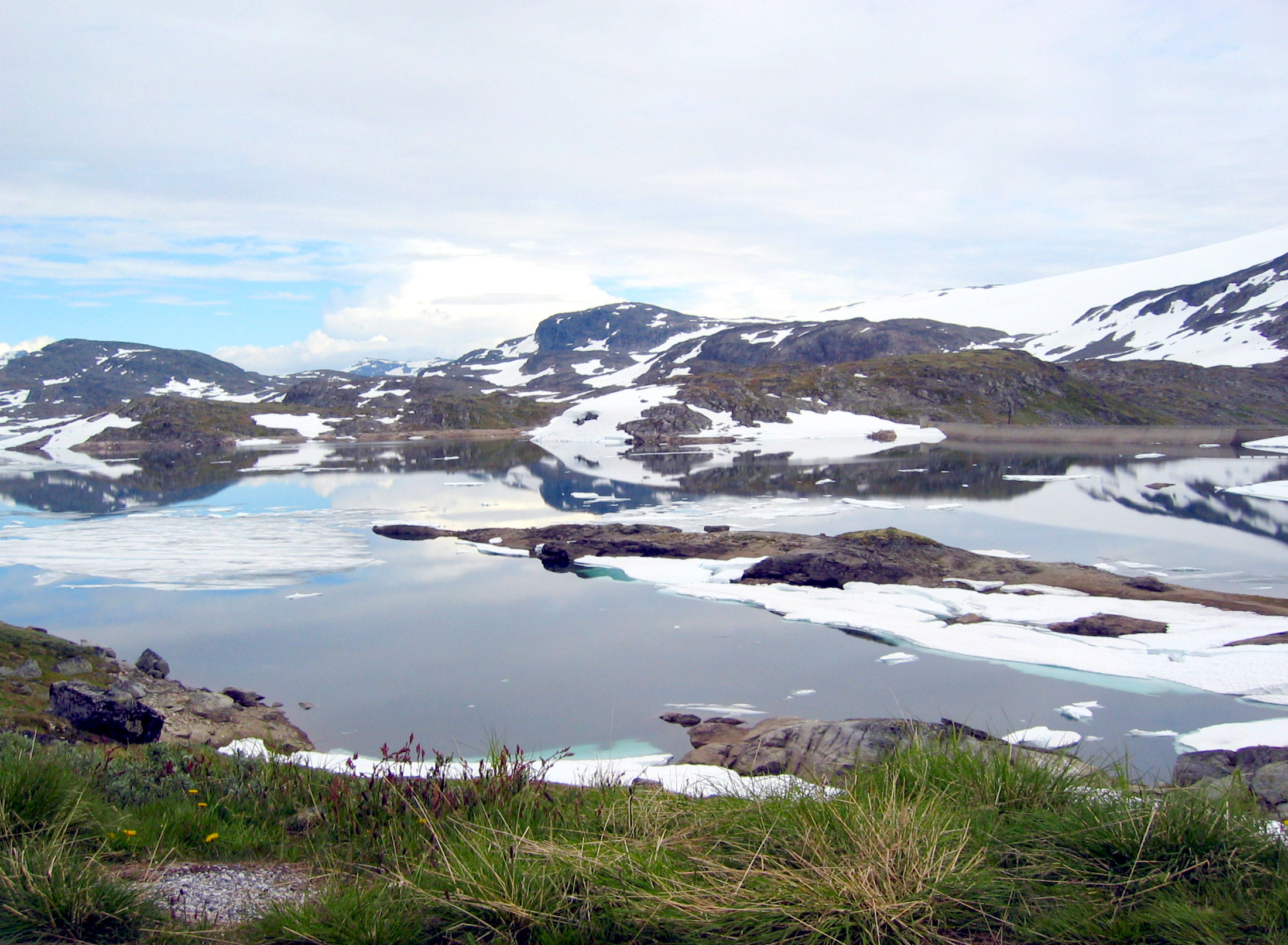
Sognefjell

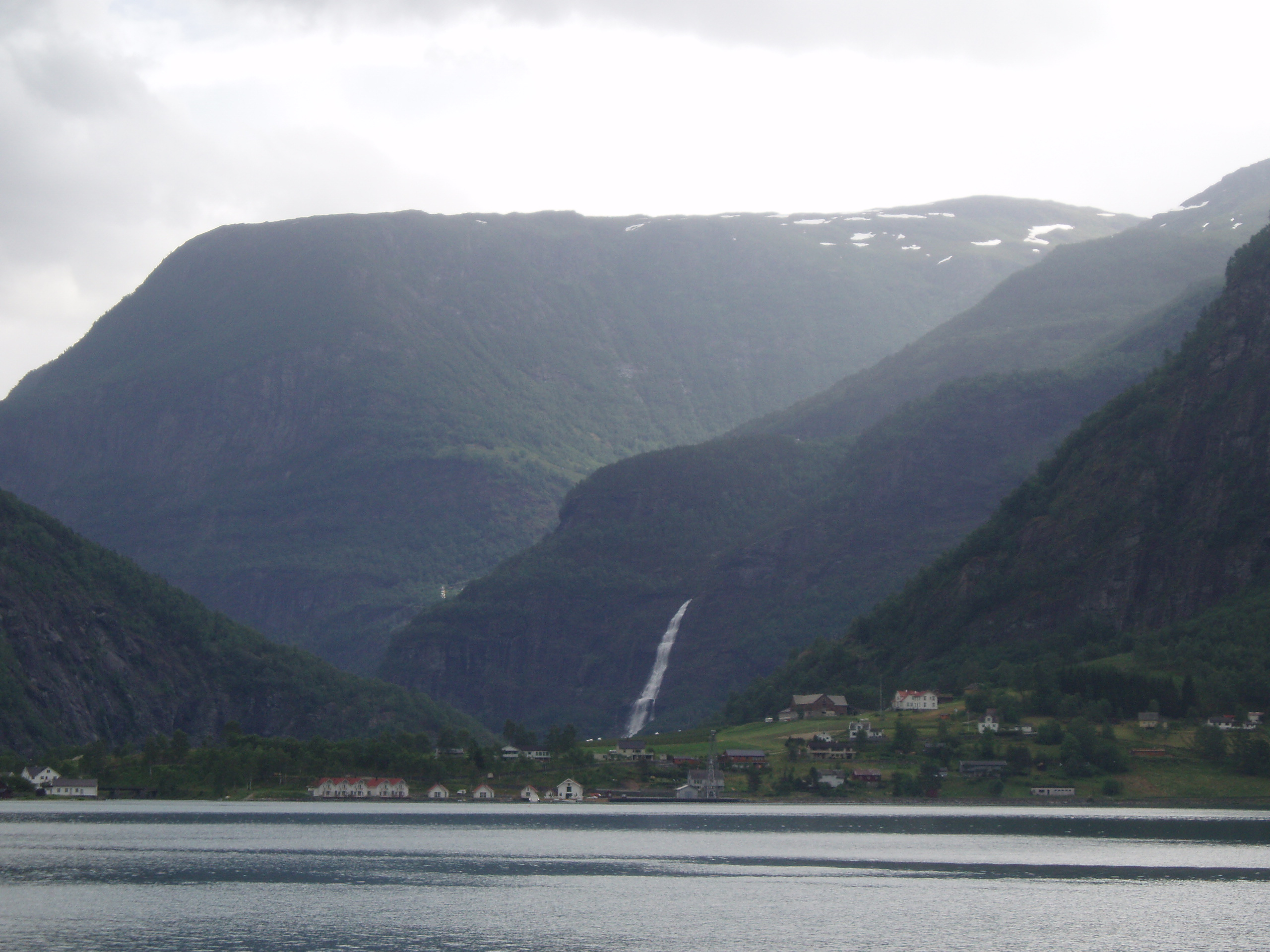
Skjolden at Lustrafjorden in Luster, Norway

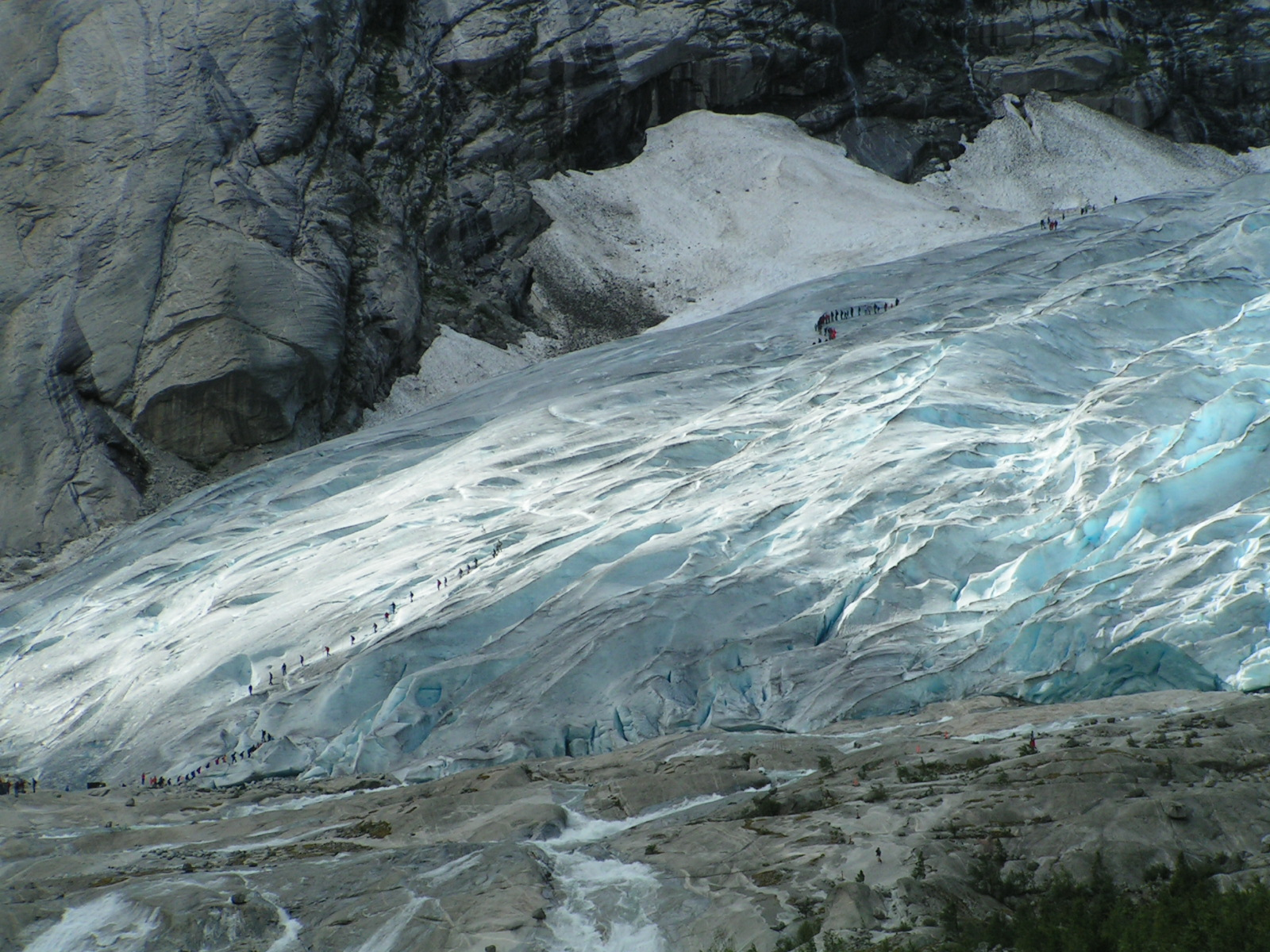
Several groups of people are glacier hiking on the glacier Nigardsbreen
