= Nes, Vestland =

Village in Luster Municipality, Norway

Nes
- Village
- Interactive map of Nes
- Location within Vestland Location within Norway
- Coordinates: 61.38881°N 7.3665°E
- Country: Norway
- Region: Western Norway
- County: Vestland
- District: Sogn
- Municipality: Luster Municipality
- Elevation: 44 m (144 ft)
- Time zone: UTC+01:00 (CET)
  - Summer (DST): UTC+02:00 (CEST)
- Post Code: 6875 Høyheimsvik

Nes is a village in Luster Municipality in Vestland county, Norway. The village is located on the western shore of the Lustrafjorden, about 5 kilometres (3.1 mi) east of the municipal centre of Gaupne. The village sits along Norwegian County Road 55, which follows the coastline of the fjord. Nes Church is located in the village.
