= Joranger Church =

Church in Vestland, Norway

- Joranger kyrkje
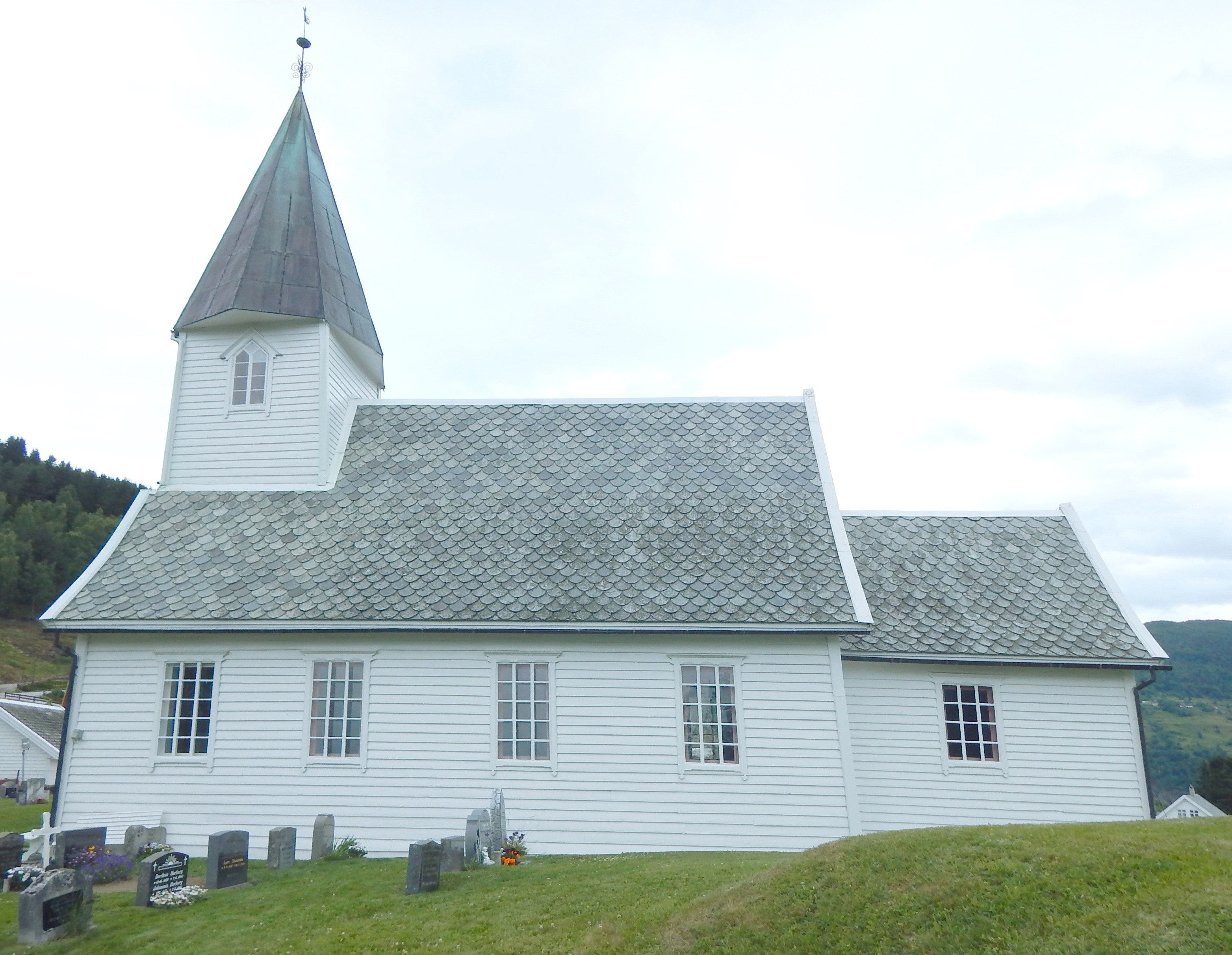
- View of the church
- Joranger Church
- 61°22′41″N 7°17′20″E
- Location: Luster Municipality, Vestland
- Country: Norway
- Denomination: Church of Norway
- Previous denomination: Catholic Church
- Churchmanship: Evangelical Lutheran

History
- Status: Parish church
- Founded: 13th century
- Consecrated: c. 1660

Architecture
- Functional status: Active
- Architectural type: Long church
- Completed: c. 1660 (366 years ago)

Specifications
- Capacity: 85
- Materials: Wood

Administration
- Diocese: Bjørgvin bispedømme
- Deanery: Sogn prosti
- Parish: Fet og Joranger
- Norwegian Cultural Heritage Site
- Type: Church
- Status: Automatically protected
- ID: 84743

Joranger Church (Norwegian: Joranger kyrkje) is a parish church of the Church of Norway in Luster Municipality in Vestland county, Norway. It is located in the village of Joranger. It is one of the churches for the Fet og Joranger parish which is part of the Sogn prosti (deanery) in the Diocese of Bjørgvin. The white, wooden church was built in a long church design using plans drawn up by an unknown architect. The building was probably constructed around the 1630s, but 1660 has historically been considered to be the construction date. The church seats about 85 people.

== History ==
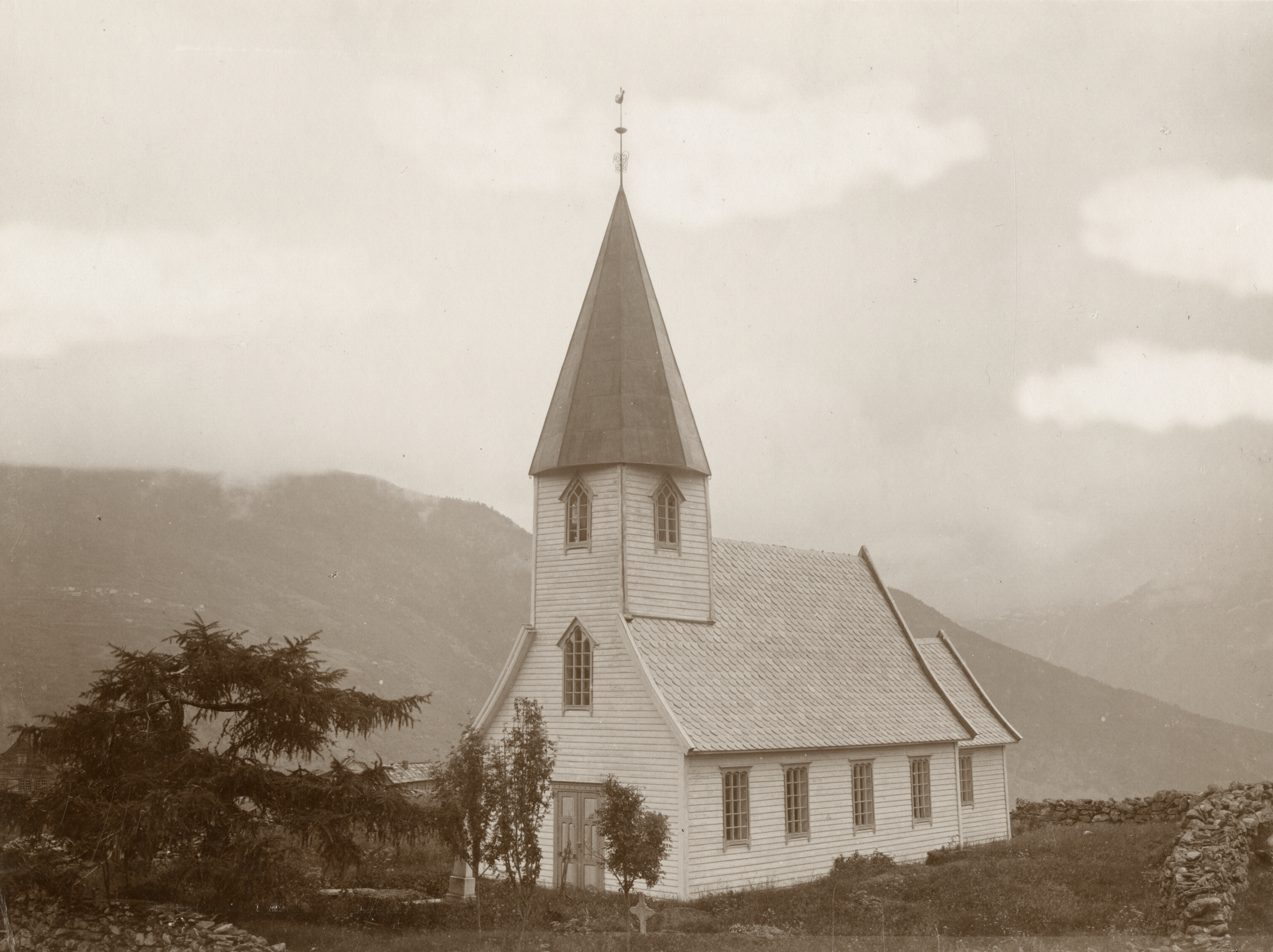
View of the church in the 1910s.

The earliest existing historical records of the church date back to the year 1340, but the church was not built that year. The first church was a wooden stave church that was located on the same site as the present church. During the 1600s, the old church was torn down and a new church was built to replace it on the same site. A sign on the church says 1620, the year 1643 is painted on one beam in the choir, and other records refer to 1660 as the year of construction. Research dates the decorations in the choir and altarpiece to 1643 and some of the decorations in the nave to 1652, so it is likely that the church was built during the 1630s or 1640s. The new church was built using some of the materials from the old stave church and it is possible that it was built in stages over a period of years. The nave measures 11.5 by 8 metres (38 ft × 26 ft) and the square choir measures 5.5 metres (18 ft) on each side. The church has a unique, large, octagonal-shaped steeple that is not in proportion with the rest of the small building. In the 1960s, a new foundation wall was laid under the church to prevent the problems caused by significant rotting of some of the wood.

== See also ==
- List of churches in Bjørgvin
