= Peter J. Dale =

American politician

Peter J. Dale (July 4, 1845 – April 20, 1935) was a Norwegian-American elected official who served as a member of the Wisconsin State Assembly.

Peter Jorgen Dale was born in Lyster Municipality in Nordre Bergenhus county, Norway. He was one of six children born to Jorgen Pederson Dale and Martha Larsdotter Dale. In 1860, he emigrated to the United States with his family and settled in Wisconsin.

He served as Justice of the peace and town clerk of Coon Prairie (now Christiana, Wisconsin). During the 1877, he was elected to serve as a member of the Wisconsin State Assembly session from Vernon County, Wisconsin. Originally elected to public office as a Republican, he later supported the People's Party. In 1890, he moved to Kandiyohi County, Minnesota where he settled on a farm near Willmar, Minnesota. Peter Dale married Gjertrud Olsdotter and together they had eight children.
