= Solvorn Church =

Church in Vestland, Norway

- Solvorn kyrkje
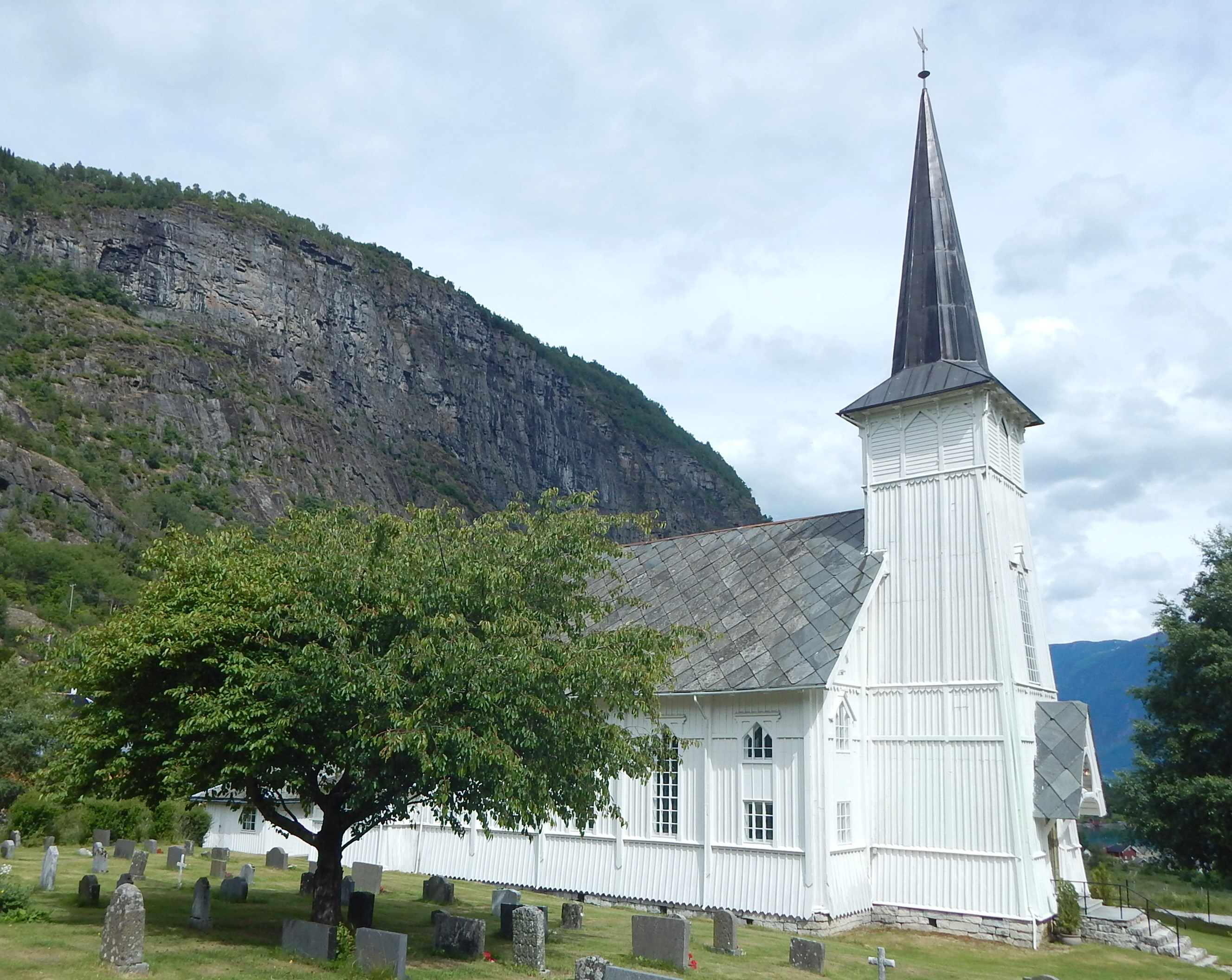
- View of the church
- Solvorn Church
- 61°18′02″N 7°14′14″E
- Location: Luster Municipality, Vestland
- Country: Norway
- Denomination: Church of Norway
- Churchmanship: Evangelical Lutheran

History
- Status: Parish church
- Founded: 14th century
- Consecrated: June 1883

Architecture
- Functional status: Active
- Architect: Waldemar Hansteen
- Architectural type: Long church
- Completed: 1883 (143 years ago)

Specifications
- Capacity: 300
- Materials: Wood

Administration
- Diocese: Bjørgvin bispedømme
- Deanery: Sogn prosti
- Parish: Solvorn
- Norwegian Cultural Heritage Site
- Type: Church
- Status: Listed
- ID: 85525

Solvorn Church (Norwegian: Solvorn kyrkje) is a parish church of the Church of Norway in Luster Municipality in Vestland county, Norway. It is located in the village of Solvorn. It is the church for the Solvorn parish which is part of the Sogn prosti (deanery) in the Diocese of Bjørgvin. The white, wooden church was built in a long church design in 1883 using plans drawn up by the architect Waldemar Hansteen. The church seats about 300 people.

== History ==
The earliest existing historical records of the church date back to the year 1340, but the church was not new at that time. The first church was likely a wooden stave church built in the early 1300s (or earlier). Not much is known about the old church. The old church was torn down around the year 1600 and it was replaced by a new timber-framed long church on the same site. This new church had a nave measuring 10 by 8 metres (33 ft × 26 ft) with a 6-by-6-metre (20 ft × 20 ft) choir on one end.

By the late-1870s, the church was too small for the parish and the nearby Urnes Stave Church parish was scheduled to be closed in 1882 and merged with Solvorn Church. So it was decided to tear down the old Solvorn Church and to build a new, larger one to accommodate the newly enlarged parish. The new church was located on the other side of the church graveyard from where the older churches were located. The new building was designed by Waldemar Hansteen and the lead builder was Dr. Wulfsberg, the uncle of Waldemar Hansteen. The new church has a notable tower with sloping sides. The new church was completed and consecrated in 1883. After the new church was completed, the old church was torn down and its materials were sold at auction.

== Media gallery ==
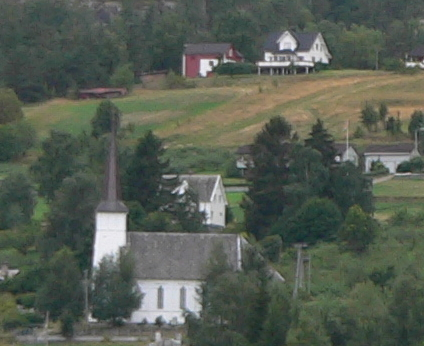
Present church

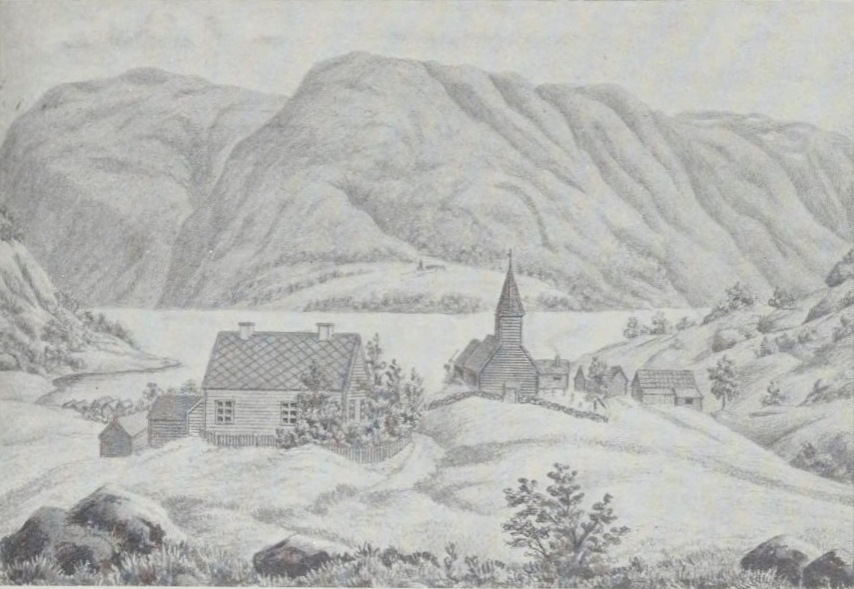
Drawing of the old church (1600-1883)

== See also ==
- List of churches in Bjørgvin
