= Solvorn =

Village in Luster Municipality, Norway

- Village
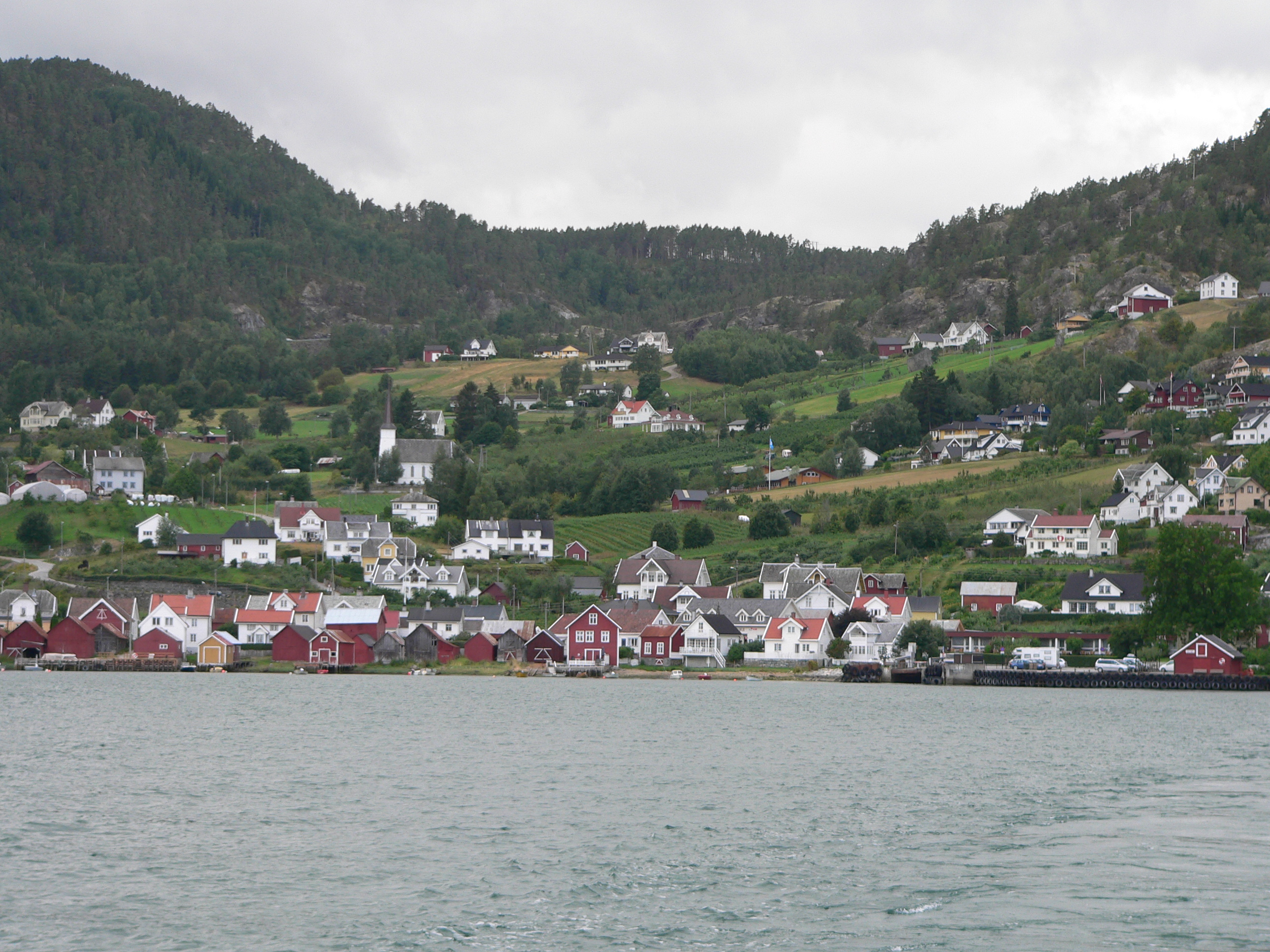
- View of the village
- Interactive map of Solvorn
- Location within Vestland Location within Norway
- Coordinates: 61.30128°N 7.24747°E
- Country: Norway
- Region: Western Norway
- County: Vestland
- District: Sogn
- Municipality: Luster Municipality
- Elevation: 3 m (9.8 ft)
- Time zone: UTC+01:00 (CET)
  - Summer (DST): UTC+02:00 (CEST)
- Post Code: 6879 Solvorn

Solvorn is a village in Luster Municipality in Vestland county, Norway. The village is located on the western shore of the Lustrafjorden, the innermost part of the Sognefjorden. The village sits directly across the fjord from the village of Ornes, where the famous 12th-century Urnes Stave Church is located. The village of Hafslo lies about 4 kilometres (2.5 mi) to the northwest.

The village is the site of the historic Walaker Hotel, dating back to about 1650. Solvorn Church, built in 1883, is located in the village. There has been a regular ferry route from Solvorn to Ornes, across the fjord, since 1859. From 1963 until 1990, there was also a regular ferry route from Solvorn to Årdalstangen, about 35 kilometres (22 mi) down the fjord.

== History ==
Solvorn has a long history as a trade center, a church site, a courthouse site, and it was the seat of the district magistrate for Inner Sogn. The village has had a church since the Middle Ages, the first time Solvorn Church is mentioned in historical records is in the 14th century. Solvorn was a natural place to go to for all the people who lived around the lake Hafslovatnet and its surrounding villages when they would sell or buy anything. The village had its heyday when the fjord was the main thoroughfare for transportation for the region. Since that time, car transportation has become more important than fjord travel, and the Norwegian County Road 55 was built on the other side of the mountains, closer to Hafslo, so Solvorn is no longer located along the main transportation route. Solvorn received a post office in 1841 and had that post office until 1995 when it was closed.

=== Name ===
The name (Old Norse: Solvǫrn) seems to be a compound of sól (meaning 'sun') and vǫrn (meaning 'protection'). The meaning of the name is then 'protector of the Sun'. This might refer to the fact that the deep valley of Solvorn secured the old chieftain site of Ornes' sunlight in the evenings, when the areas north and south of Ornes lies in the shadows of the mountains.

== Media gallery ==
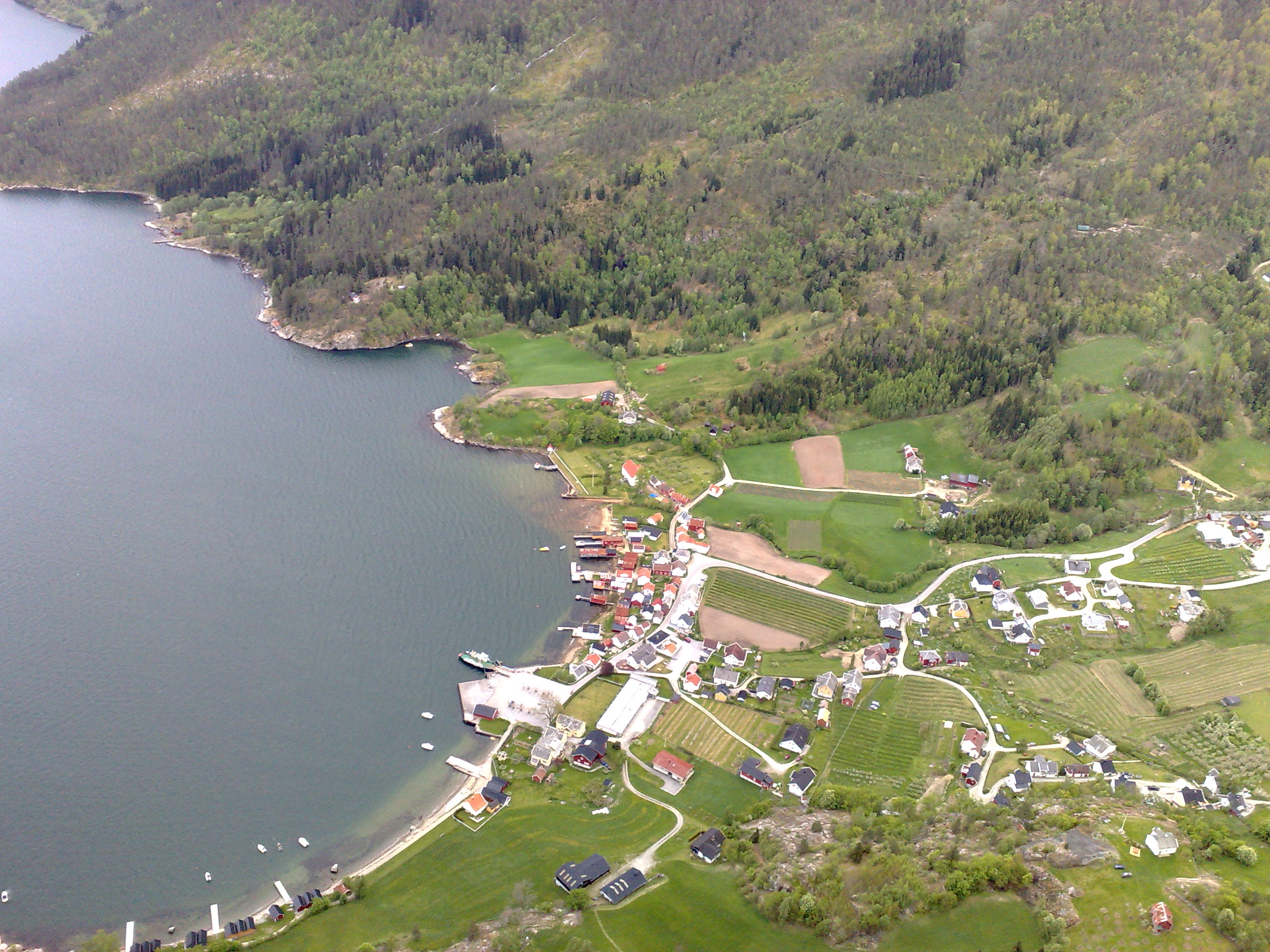
Aerial view of the village

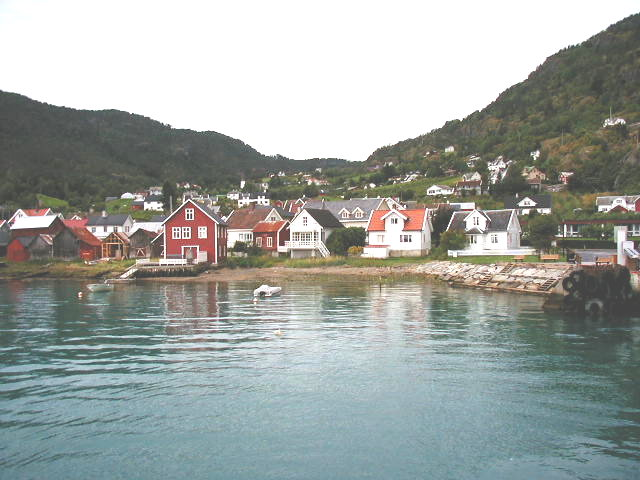
View from the fjord, looking west

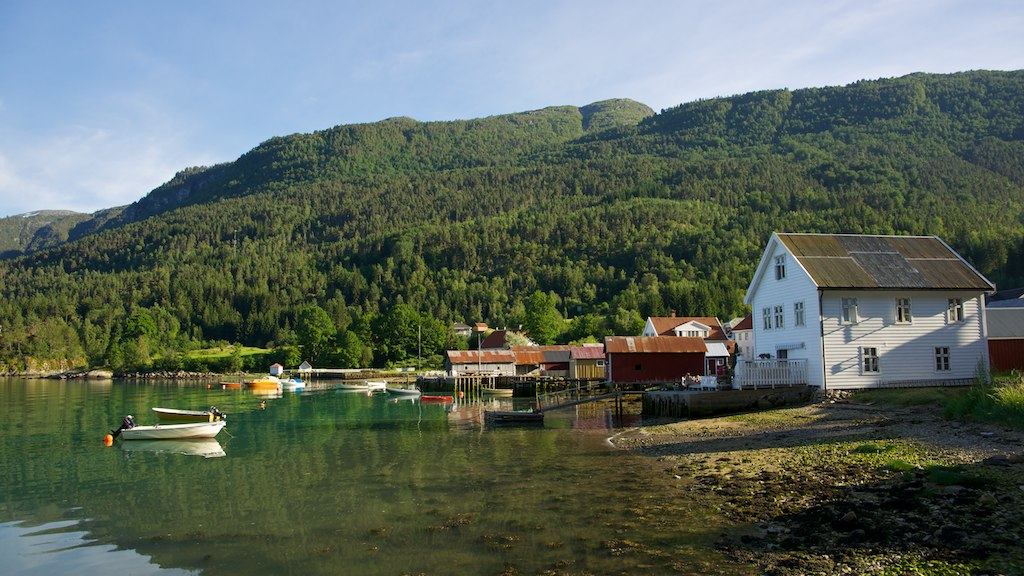
View of boathouses along the fjord

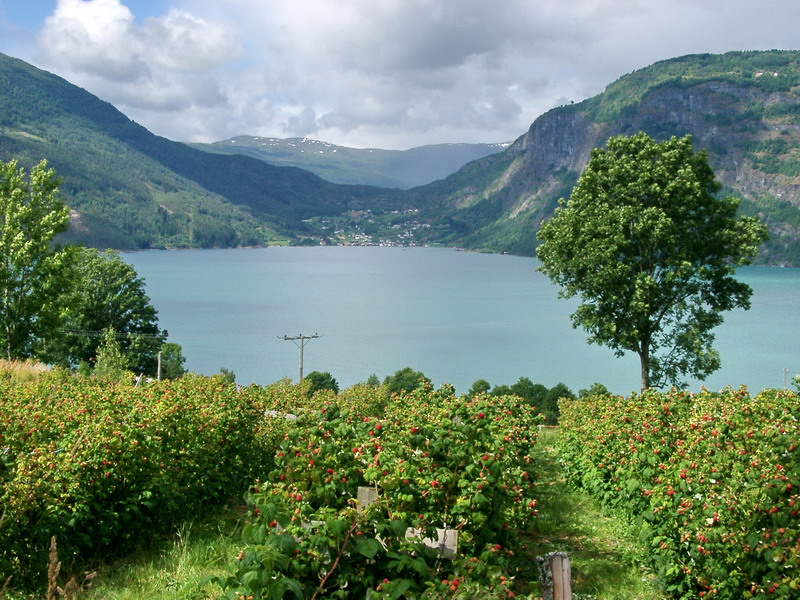
View of Solvorn from Ornes (across the fjord)

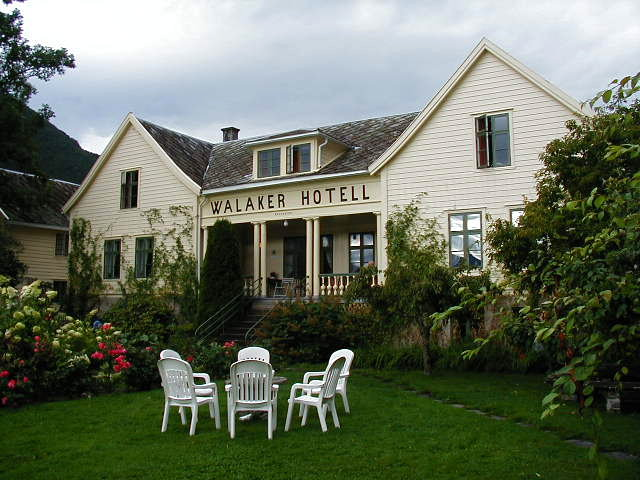
Walaker hotel

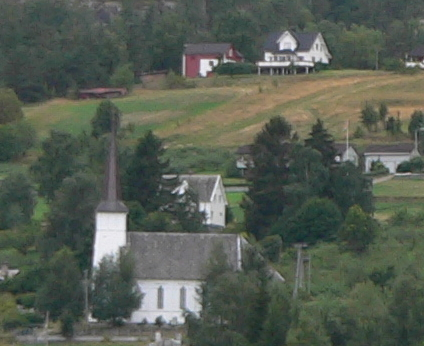
Solvorn Church
