= Ornes, Vestland =

Village in Luster Municipality, Norway

Ornes Urnes
- Village
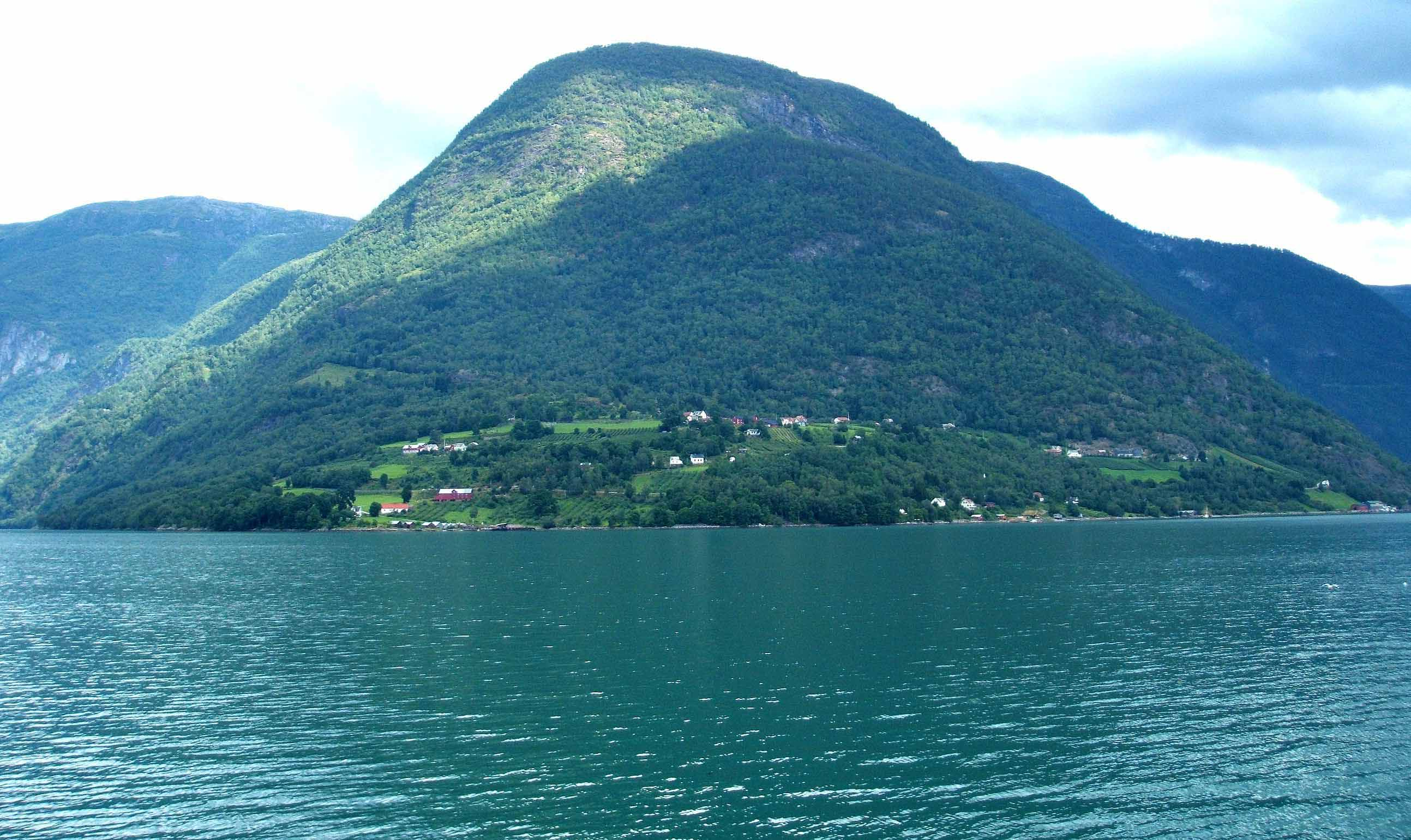
- View of the village
- Interactive map of Ornes
- Location within Vestland Location within Norway
- Coordinates: 61.3°N 7.31667°E
- Country: Norway
- Region: Western Norway
- County: Vestland
- District: Sogn
- Municipality: Luster Municipality
- Elevation: 41 m (135 ft)
- Time zone: UTC+01:00 (CET)
  - Summer (DST): UTC+02:00 (CEST)
- Post Code: 6870 Ornes

Ornes is a village in Luster Municipality in Vestland county, Norway. The village is located on a small peninsula that juts out into the Lustrafjorden, the innermost part of the Sognefjorden. The village sits on the east side of the fjord, directly across the fjord from the village of Solvorn. Ornes is notable because it is the site of the 12th century Urnes Stave Church.

There has been a regular ferry route from Ornes to Solvorn, across the fjord, since 1859.

== Media gallery ==
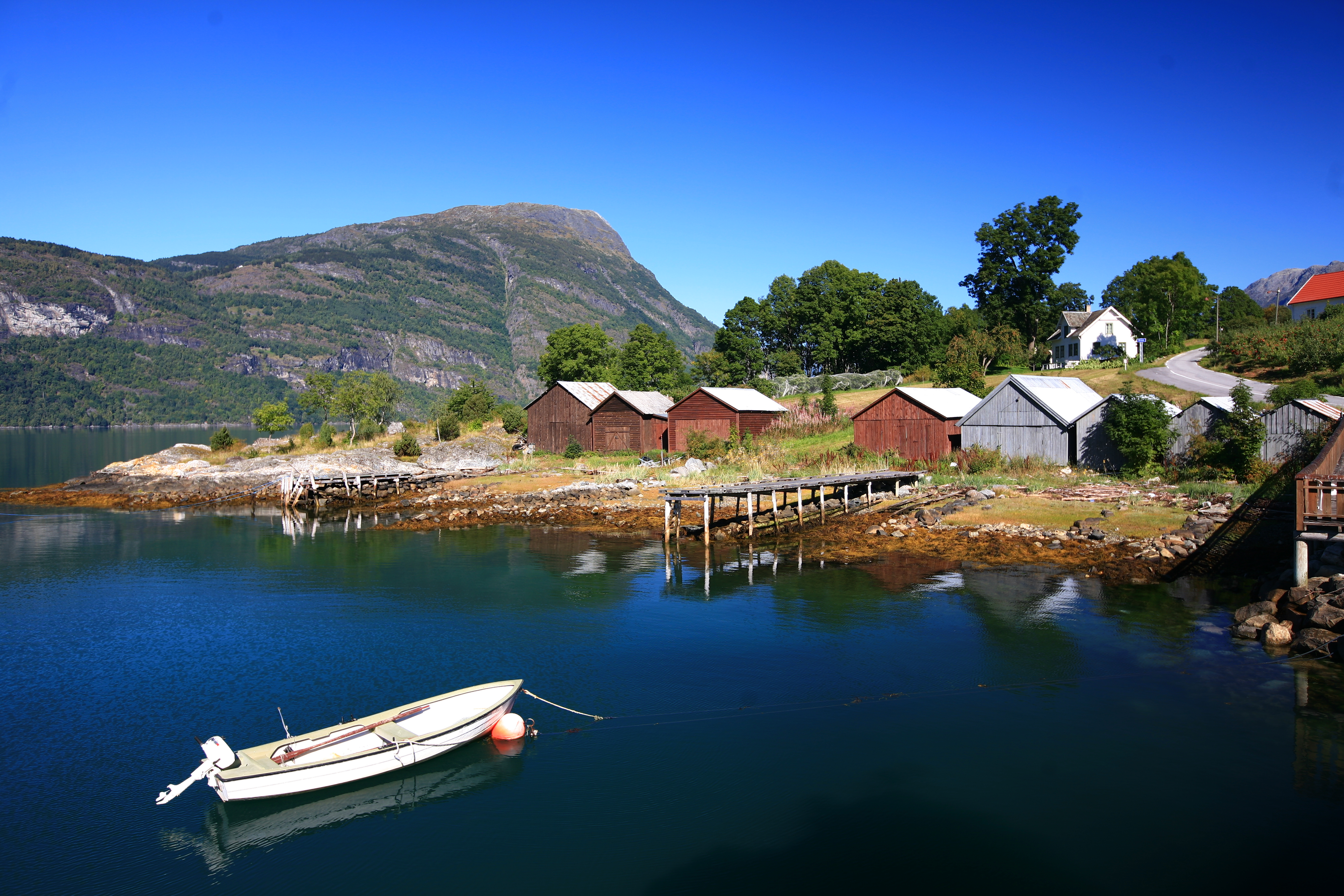
Boathouses at Ornes

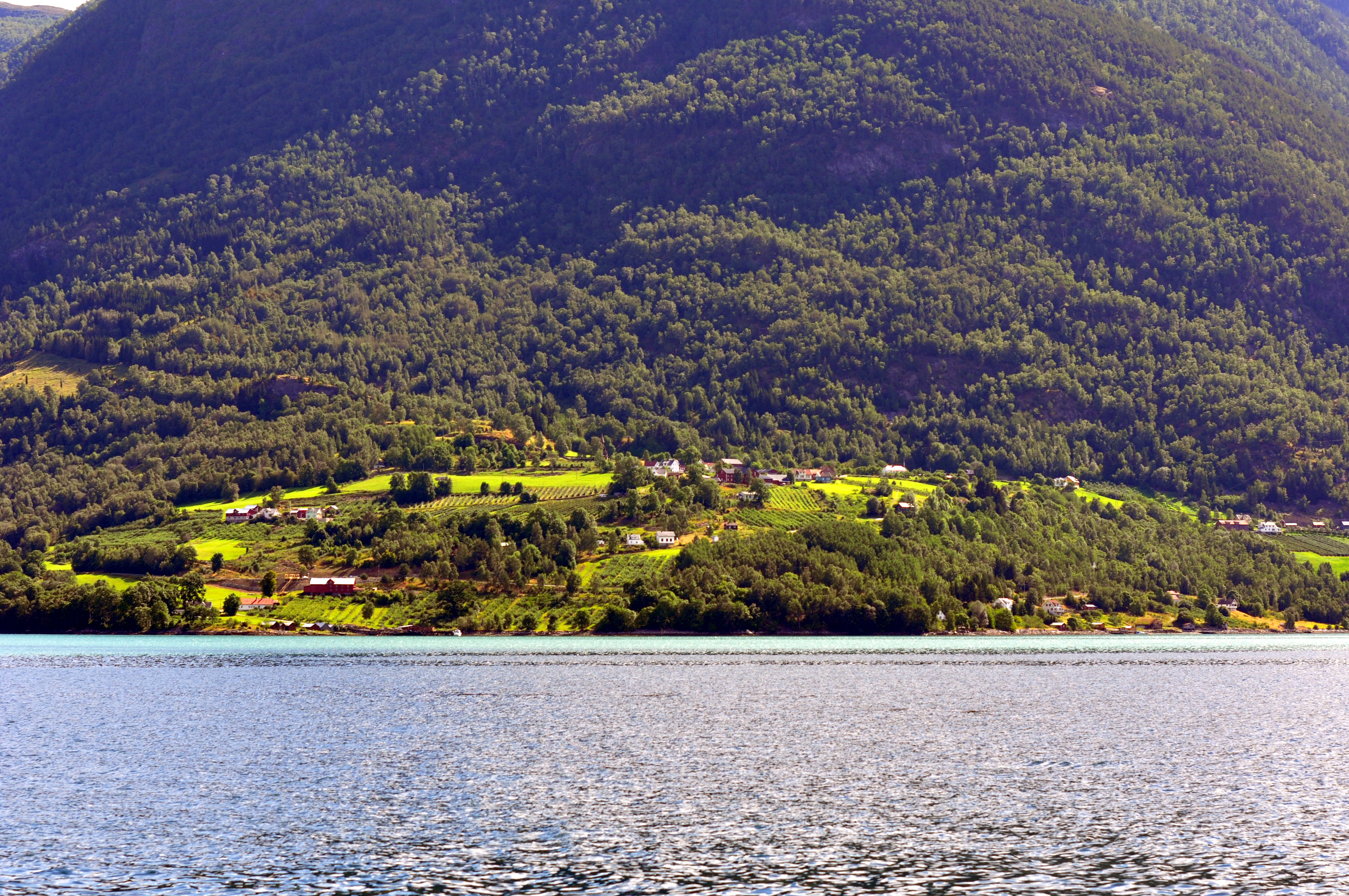
View of the Ornes area

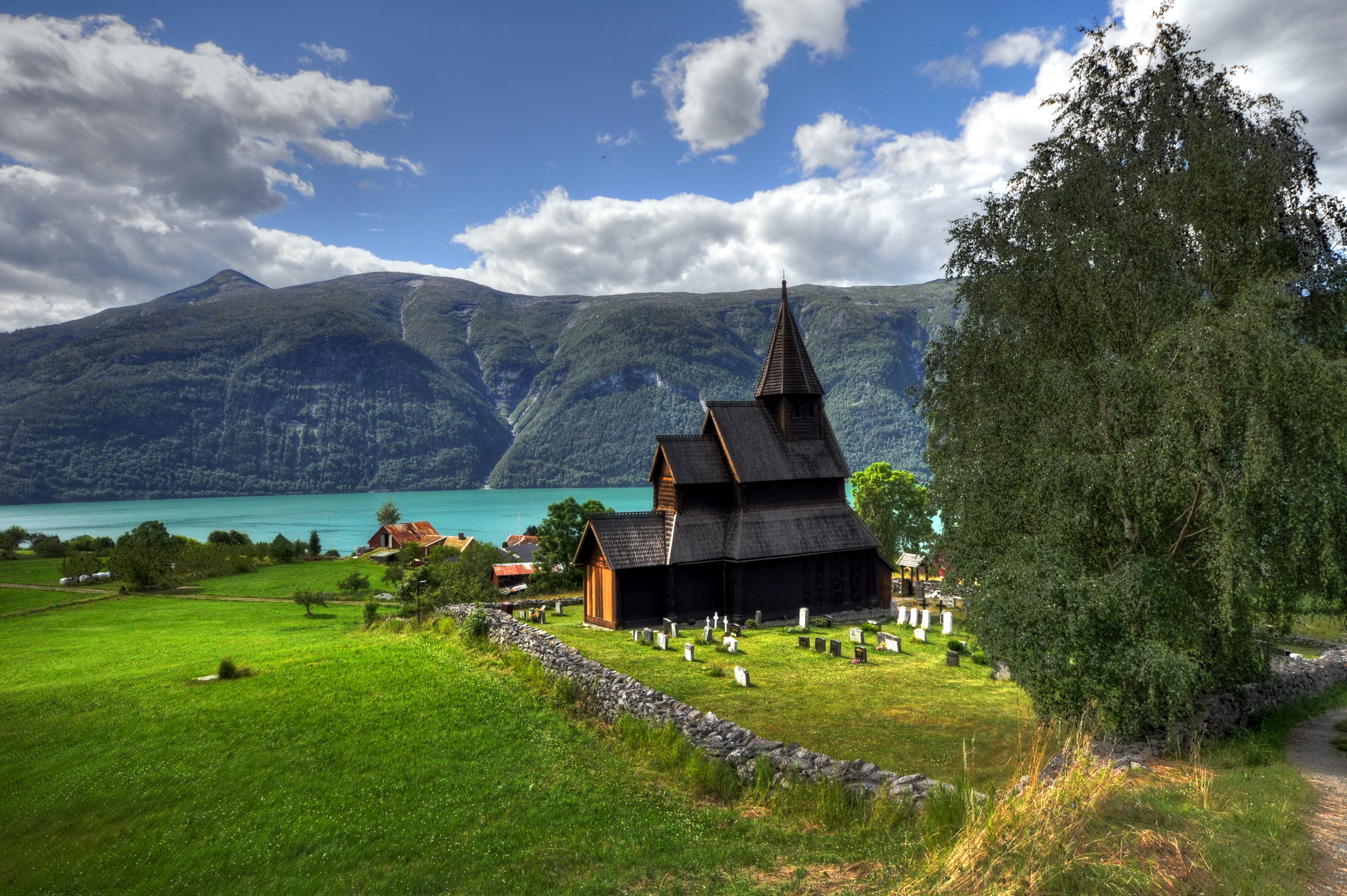
Stave Church at Ornes, looking across the fjord

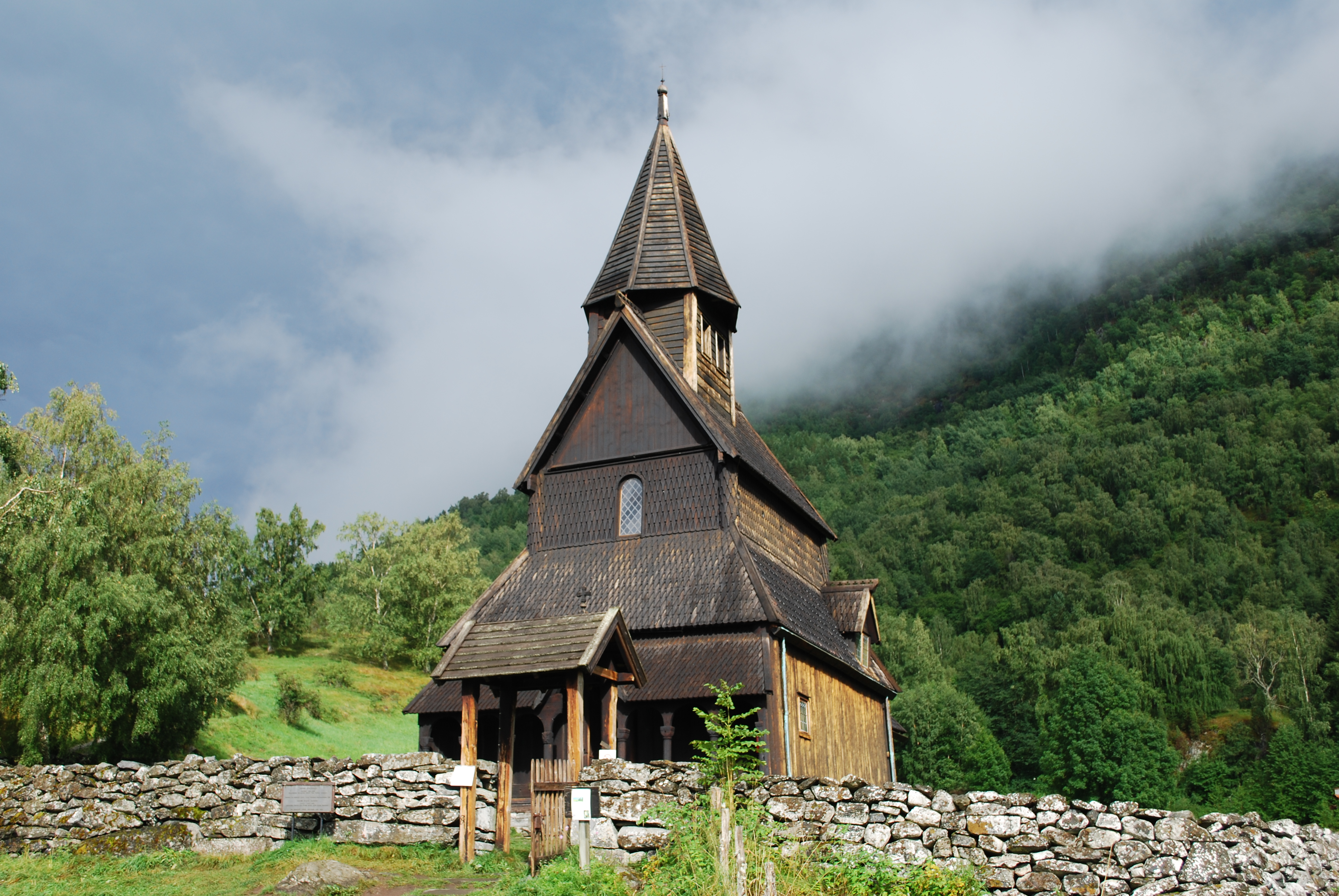
Front view of the stave church

== Name ==
The Old Norse form of the name was Órnes. The first element is the preposition ór which means "out of" or "outstanding" and the last element is nes which means "headland" or "naze". The common historical form Urnes is from the time of Danish rule and uses an older Danish spelling ("Wrnes" 1563, "Vrnes" 1666, etc.).
