= Urnes Stave Church =

Church in Vestland, Norway

- Urnes stavkyrkje
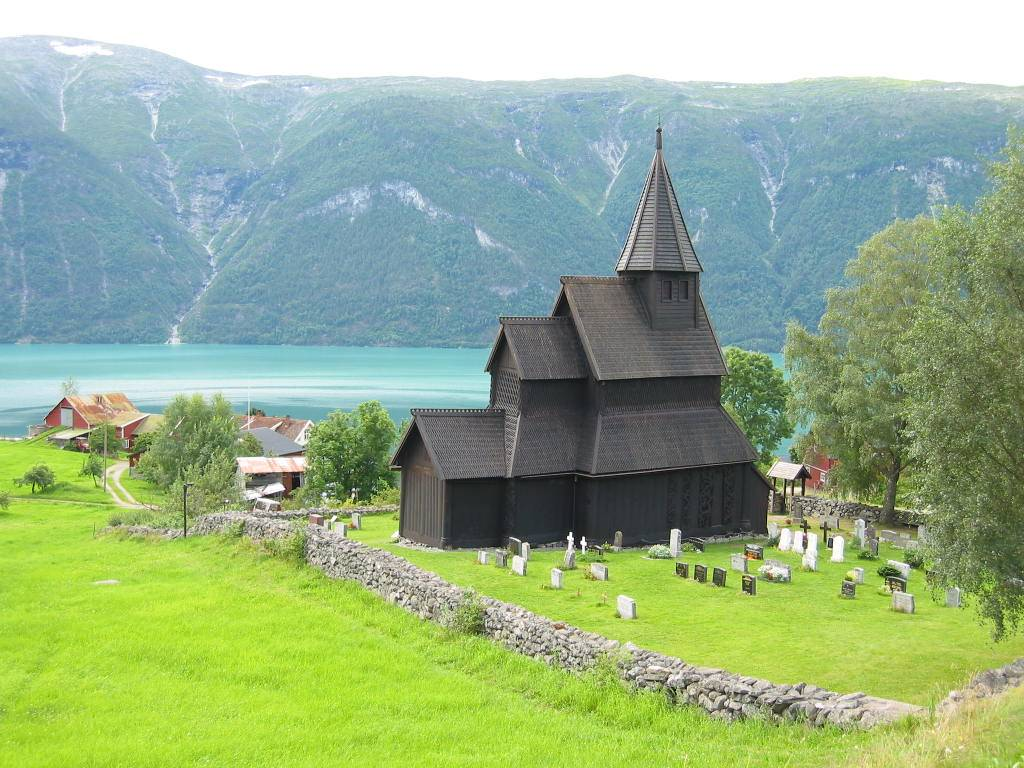

- Location within Vestland Location within Norway

Religion
- Affiliation: Church of Norway
- Ecclesiastical or organisational status: Parish church (former)
- Status: Preserved

Location
- Location: Ornes
- Municipality: Luster (Vestland)
- Country: Norway
- Coordinates: 61°17′53″N 7°19′21″E

Architecture
- Architect: Bendik Urne
- Type: Stave church
- Style: Romanesque
- Completed: c. 1132 (dendrochronological dating)
- Materials: Timber
- UNESCO World Heritage Site
- Official name: Urnes Stave Church
- Type: Cultural
- Criteria: i, ii, iii
- Designated: 1979 (3rd session)
- Reference no.: 58
- State Party: Norway
- Region: Europe and North America

Urnes Stave Church (Norwegian: Urnes stavkyrkje) is a 12th-century stave church at Ornes, along the Lustrafjorden, in Luster Municipality in Vestland county, Norway.

The church sits on the eastern side of the fjord, directly across the fjord from the village of Solvorn and about five kilometres (3 mi) east of the village of Hafslo. It is among the oldest stave churches in Norway, with parts of the lumber construction dating from the latter half of the 11th century. The church was built in a long church basilica plan inspired by medieval Christian churches, with cylindrical columns and semi-circular arches inside. The decoration on capitals of the columns and outside of the church embodies the visual evidence of the Viking culture’s transformation, assimilation, and adoption of Christianity. The north portal of the church is defined as the Urnes style, which contains decorations derived from Norwegian mythology dating back to the 12th century.

It has been owned by Fortidsminneforeningen (Society for the Preservation of Norwegian Ancient Monuments) since 1881. In 1979, the Urnes Stave Church was listed as a World Heritage Site by UNESCO.

== Context ==
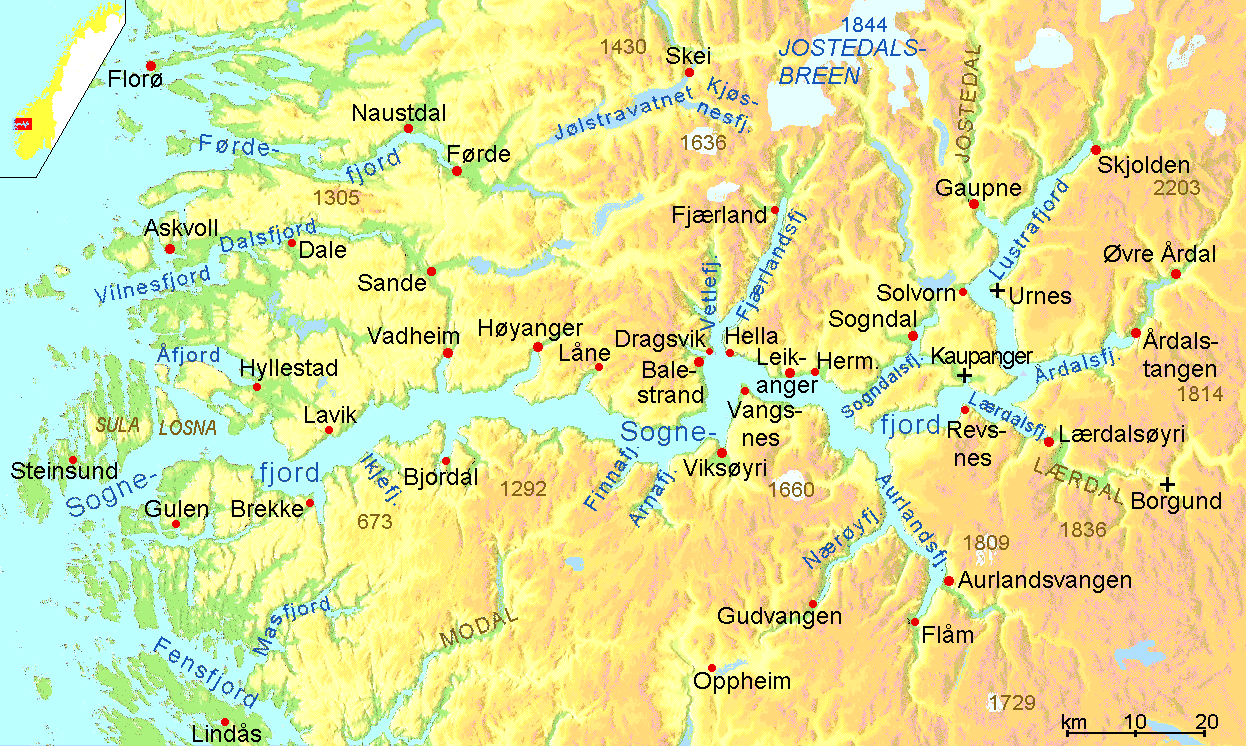
Location in Sognefjord (map of Norway inserted)

Stave churches in Norway can be dated back to the 10th–11th century. Stave churches are wooden buildings covered with wall planks; the frame of the overall structure is constructed with timber balks and the wall planks are fitted into the frames where convenient.

The word "Stave" (Norwegian: Stav) means sturdy wood columns that are the corner posts and columns which uphold the overall architectural structure. The Stave Style can be defined as using the upright wall planks.

The Urnes Stave Church was built around the year 1130 or shortly thereafter, and still stands in its original location; it is believed to be the oldest of its kind. The 1956 excavation revealed that there are two prior churches built on the same site.

The first church was built during the period of transition to Christianity in the palisade style, in which structural members were embedded into the ground. The second one was built in the latter half of the 11th century. Both of them were small structures with the nave-and-chancel design.

In the middle of the 12th century, the second church was torn down; the third church, based on some part of the second one, was vastly different from it. It incorporated a central section of nave which is higher above the rest of the building; the framework contains 16 large staves, and defines nave and surrounding aisles. The roof of the central compartment is 2 metres (6 ft 7 in) higher than the roof of aisles.

This design was immensely popular at the time and served as inspiration for later stave churches. It provides a link between Christian architecture and the architecture and art forms of the Viking Age with typical animal-ornamentation, the so-called "Urnes style" of animal-art.

== Architecture ==
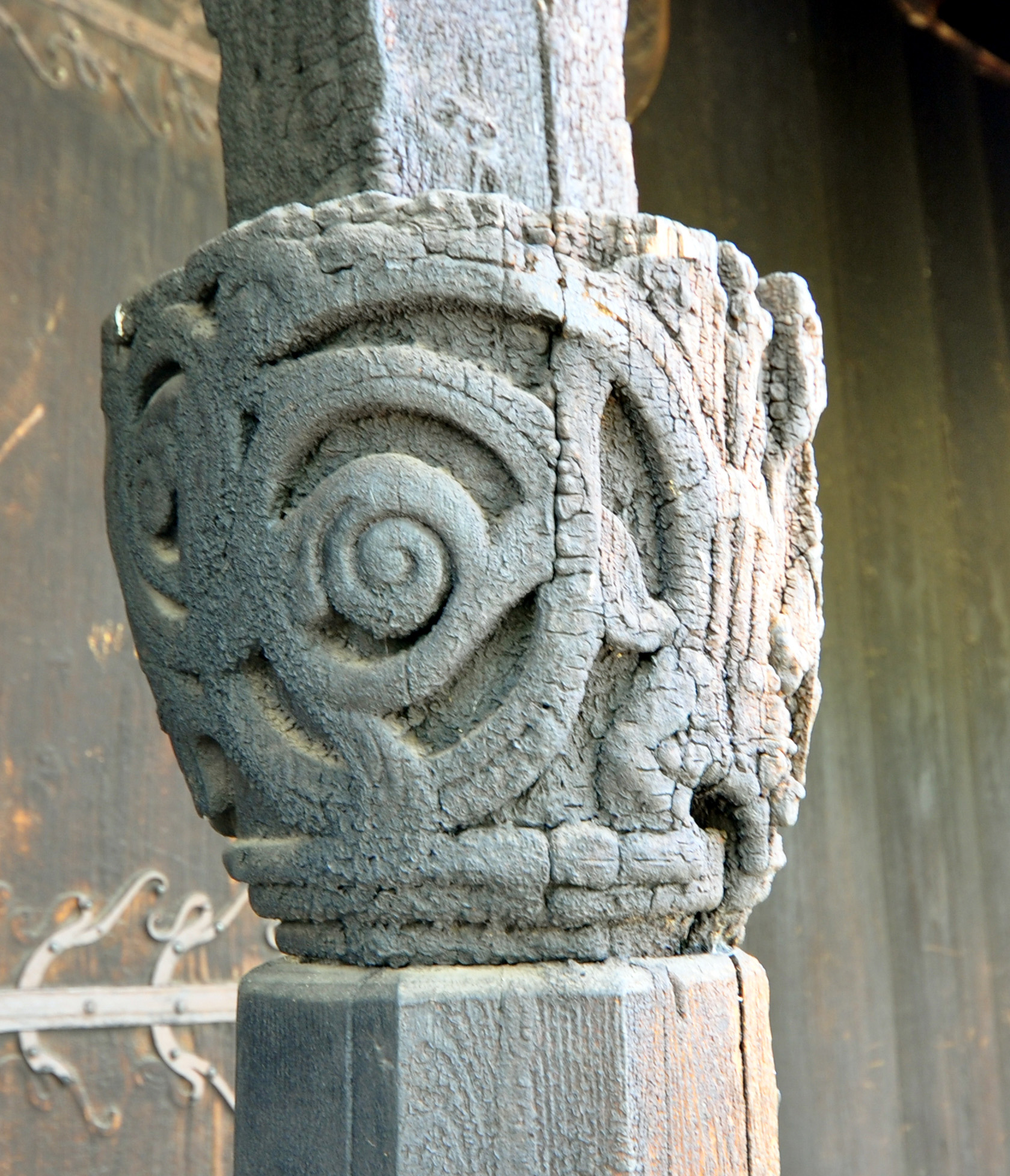
A capital at the entrance to the church

The entirely wooden churches at Urnes were built according to the imported basilica plan used by many of the Romanesque churches throughout the rest of medieval Europe. However, the roof frame lined with boards and covered in shingles was already a common architectural technique in Scandinavian countries. The use of cylindrical columns with cubic capitals and semi-circular arches reveals another borrowing from the arched masonry traditions of Romanesque architecture, translated into timber construction.

=== Interior ===
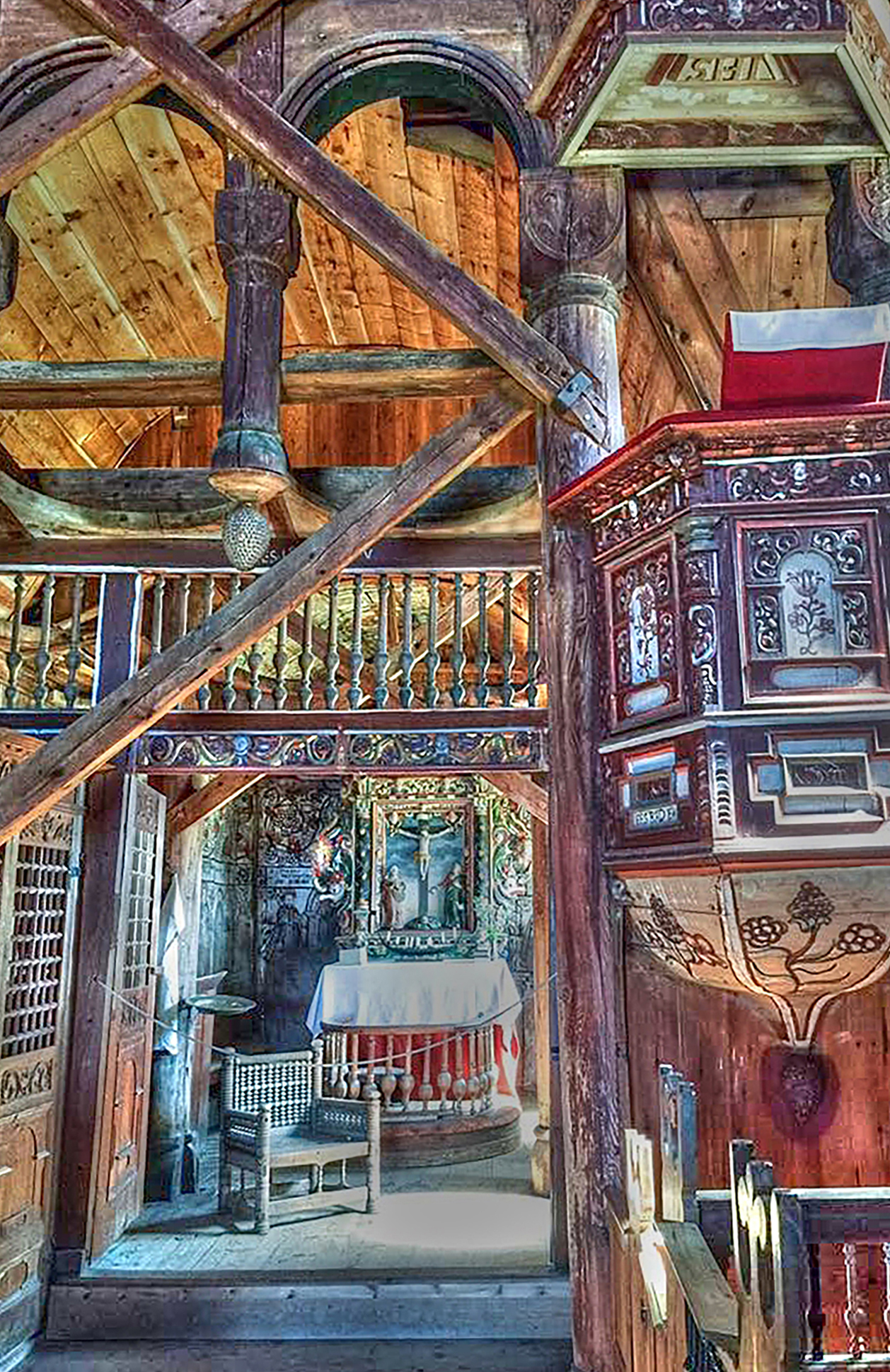
A view of the interior

The interior of the church is more richly decorated than the exterior. The structure is partly held up by a series of 12th century wooden columns, whose capitals are decorated with carvings of human, animal, and vegetal motifs. Some of these capitals contain simple abstracted figures while others feature traditional interlacing designs derived from the Viking tradition. The church is also home to numerous medieval liturgical objects for public worship.

In the 17th century the central nave of the church was extended southwards. Several furnishings were also added, including a baptismal font (1640), a wooden canopy above the altar (1665) and a pulpit (1693–1695). The altarpiece, which depicts Christ on the cross with the Virgin Mary and John the Baptist, dates from 1699. Windows were added to the church in the 18th century.

=== North wall and portal ===
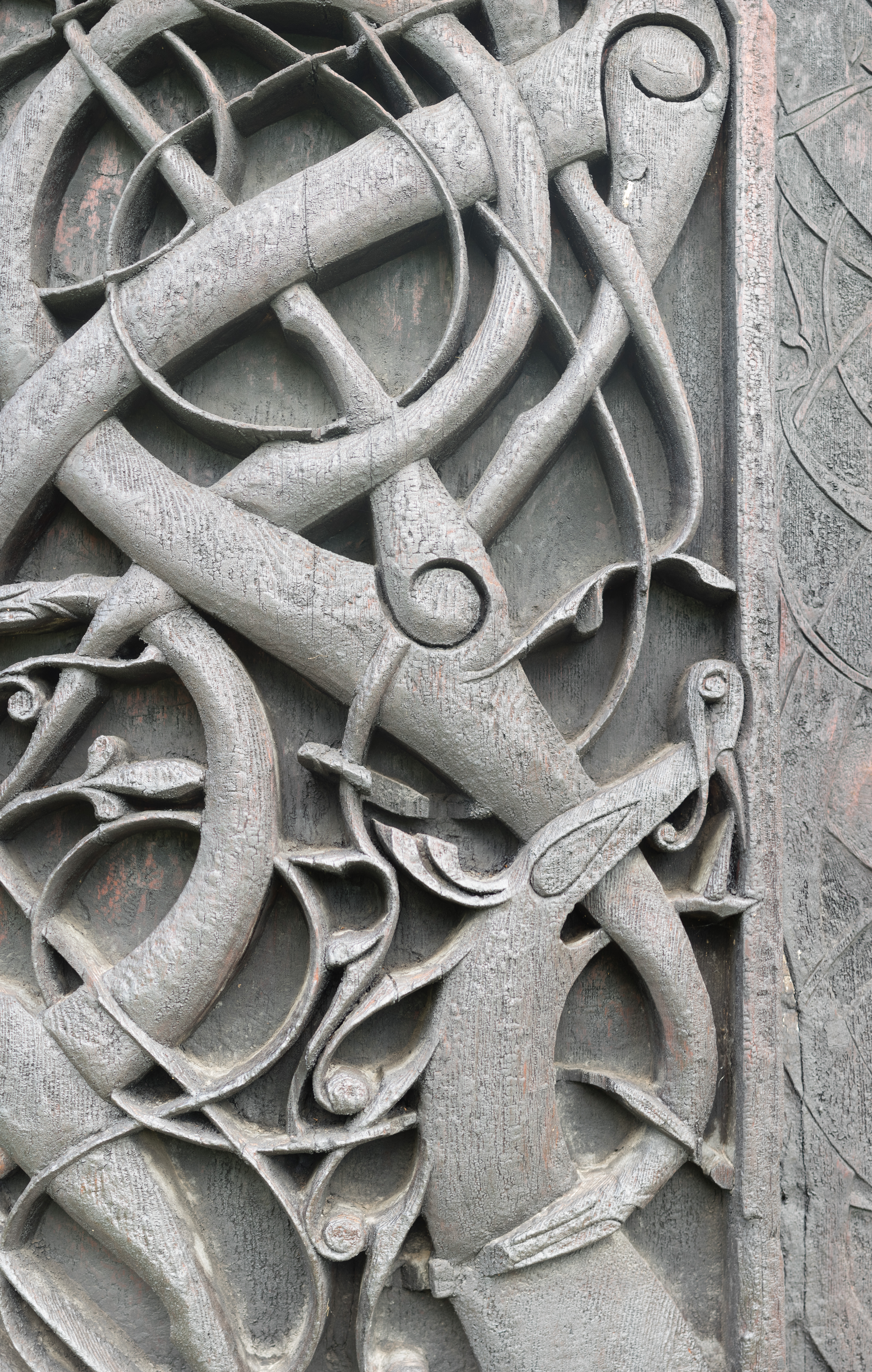
Carvings of the north portal (11th c.)

The decorations on the outside of the Urnes Stave Church, including wood carvings and sculpted decor, serve as visual evidence of the Viking culture's transformation, assimilation, and adoption of Christianity. Most notable are the strap-work elements that were salvaged from the previous 11th century Urnes Church and reused in the current structure, keeping elements of Viking tradition alive. These include several panels on the north wall, the north portal, and a carved corner column. The use of interlaced animals in the carvings is one of the last examples of Norse animal ornamentation, representing the eponymous Urnes style of late Viking-era art. The wall planks of some of the gables are also decorated in this style.

It has been speculated that the north portal may originally have been the main portal, facing west. In mythology and religions, the portal is meant to let people enter into God's house. In a Christian sense, the portals are the symbolic embodiment in the mortal world of the chaos and struggle with evil in daily life.

Here, the struggle between the serpent with the great beast, as shown in the portal at Urnes, represents the onset of Ragnarok. It is possible that the decoration of the earlier church featured some scenes from Norse mythology, a likely reason for its premature reconstruction in the 12th century. In this context, the animal may be interpreted as Níðhöggr eating the roots of Yggdrasil. "The intertwined snakes and dragons represent the end of the world according to the Norse legend of Ragnarök".

The Urnes style doorway with carved whorls of writhing snakes and vines, in a welter of elongated animals and plants reduced to vines. The most important point of the huge tangle is to present the intertwinedness itself of all living things, animal or vegetable. On the right hand side, about one-third of the way from the bottom a serpent is even emitting a fleur-de-lis from its mouth. The visual characteristic is often referred to by art historians as the Urnes style.

== 17th century to present ==
The church is built with a rectangular nave and a narrower choir. The nave and choir both have raised central spaces. The choir was extended to the east in the 17th century, but this addition was later removed. The drawing by Johan Christian Dahl depicts this, as well as the deteriorated state of the church at that time. During the 20th century the church underwent a restoration, and the richly decorated wall planks were covered to stop further deterioration.

A large number of medieval constructive elements remain in situ: ground beams (grunnstokker), sills (sviller), corner posts (hjørnestolper), wall planks (veggtiler) and aisle wall plates (stavlægjer). The construction of the raised central area with staves, strings and cross braces, and the roof itself, also date from medieval times. From the previous church on the site remain, in addition to the portal, two wall planks in the northern wall, the corner post of the choir, the western gable of the nave and the eastern gable of the choir.

The church has not been in ordinary use since 1881, when the parish of Urnes was abolished, and it became a part of Solvorn parish in the Sogn prosti (deanery) of the Diocese of Bjørgvin. It is now only used for special occasions in the parish such as baptisms and weddings.

Interventions to the church building for religious and practical needs have been carried over the centuries. These interventions are still clearly visible; they have provided authentic testimony to social life and religious practices in Norway. Now, Urnes Stave Church is one of the most popular tourist sites in Norway.

== Media gallery ==
=== Exterior ===
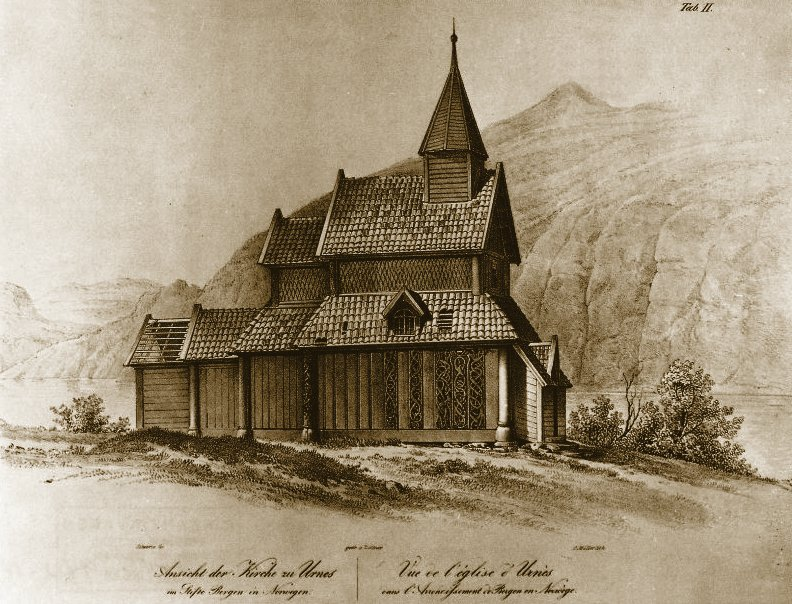
Drawing by Johan Christian Dahl

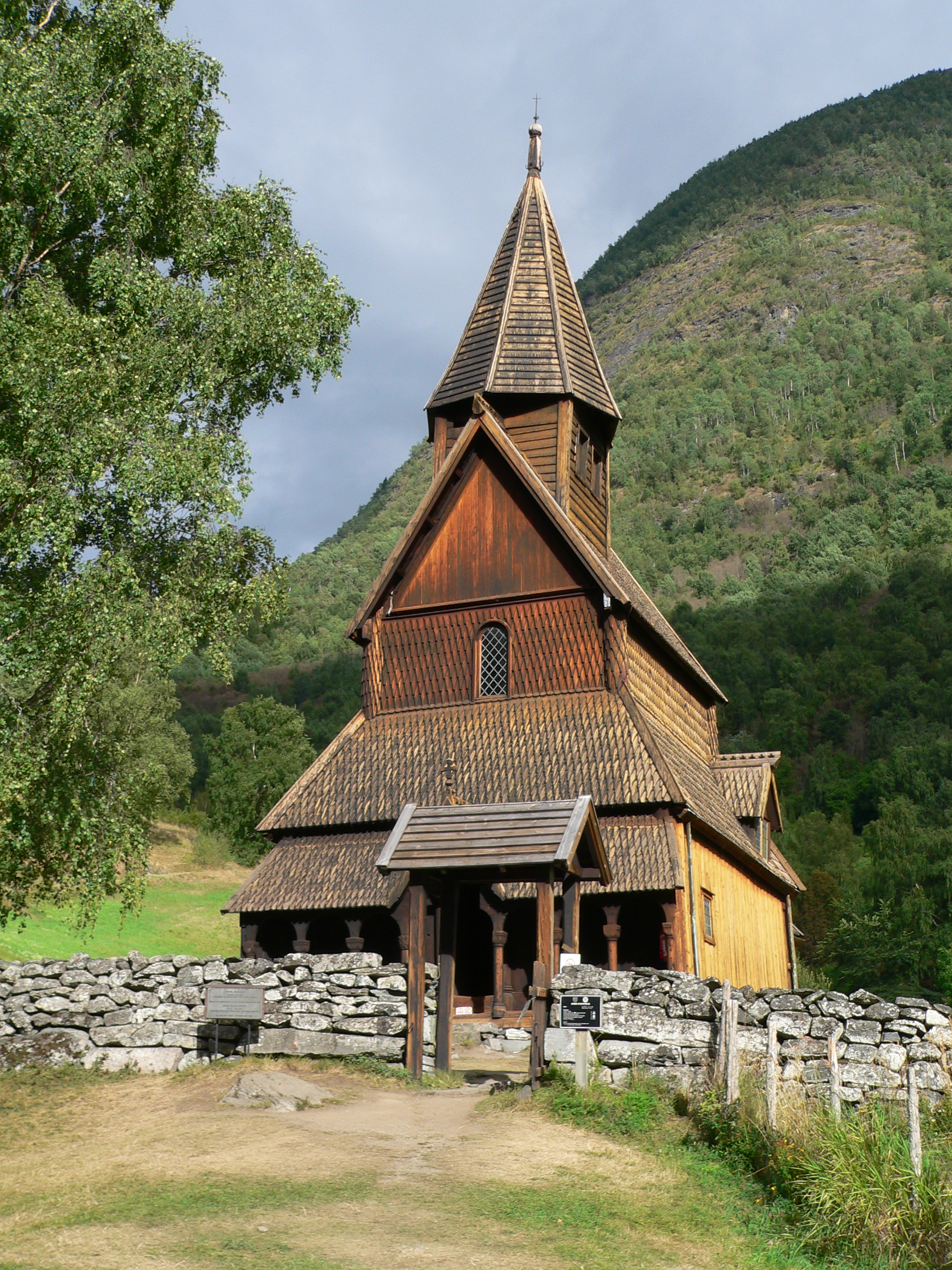
Front view of the church

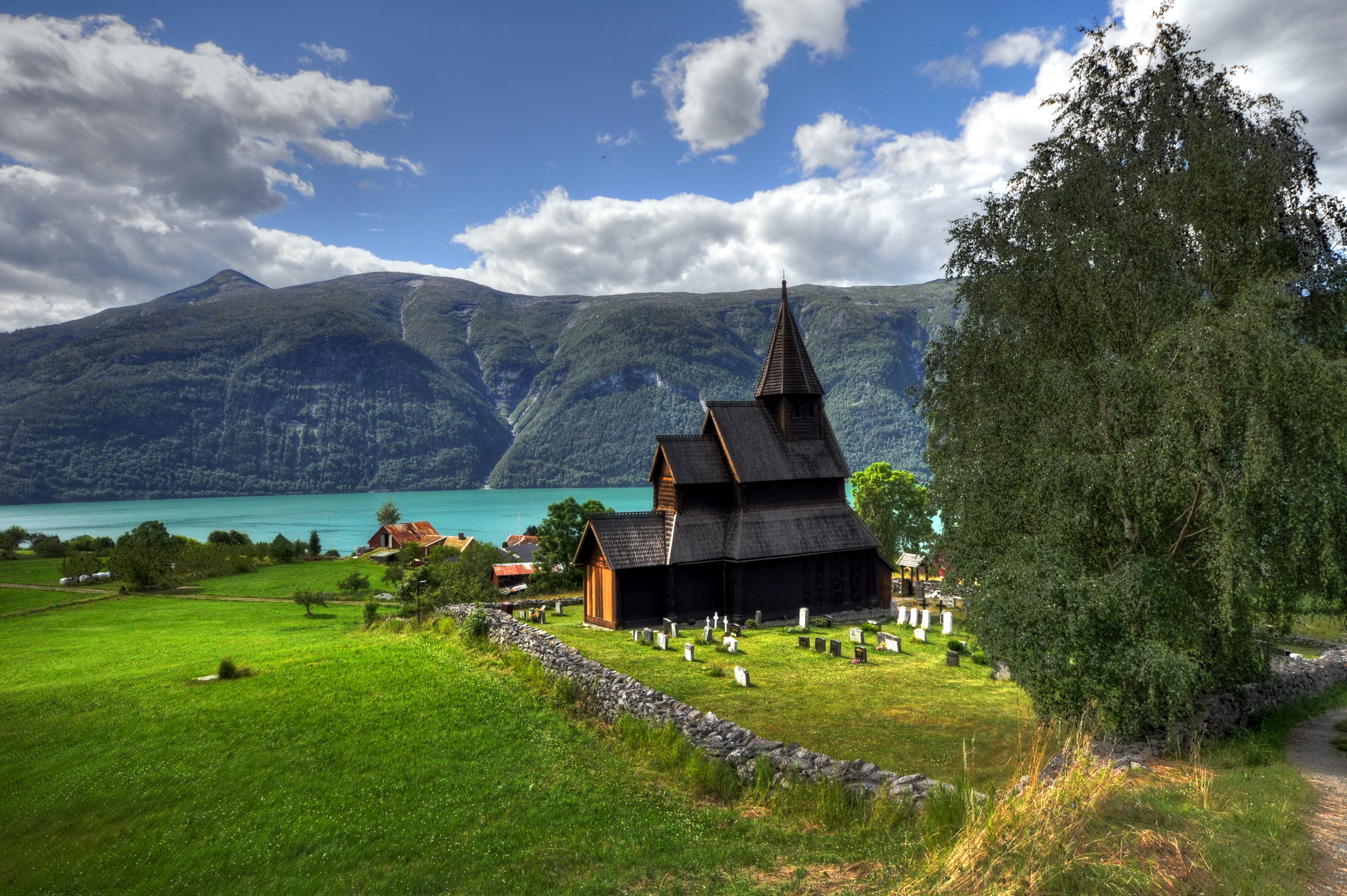
Exterior view of the church site

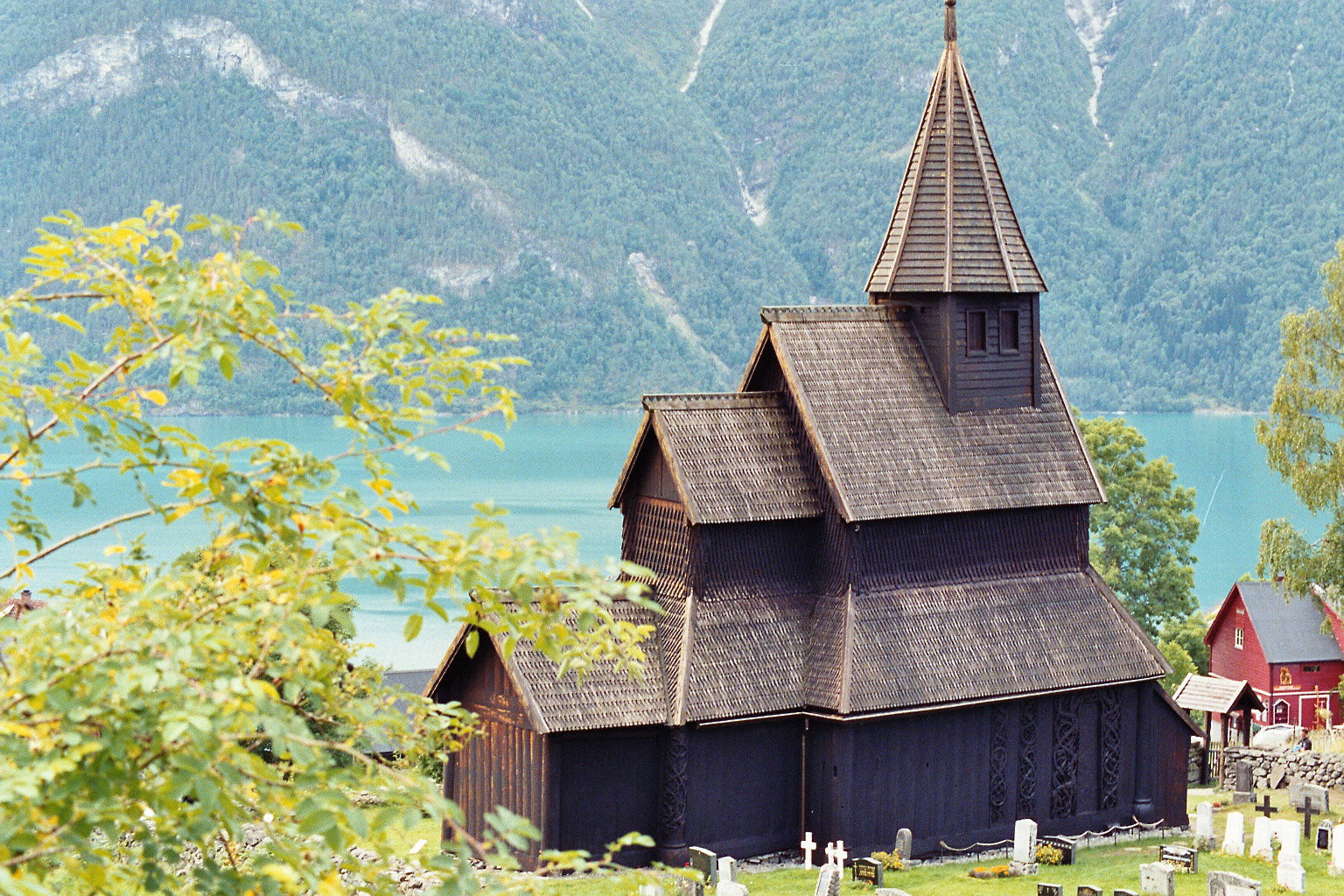
view of church and fjord

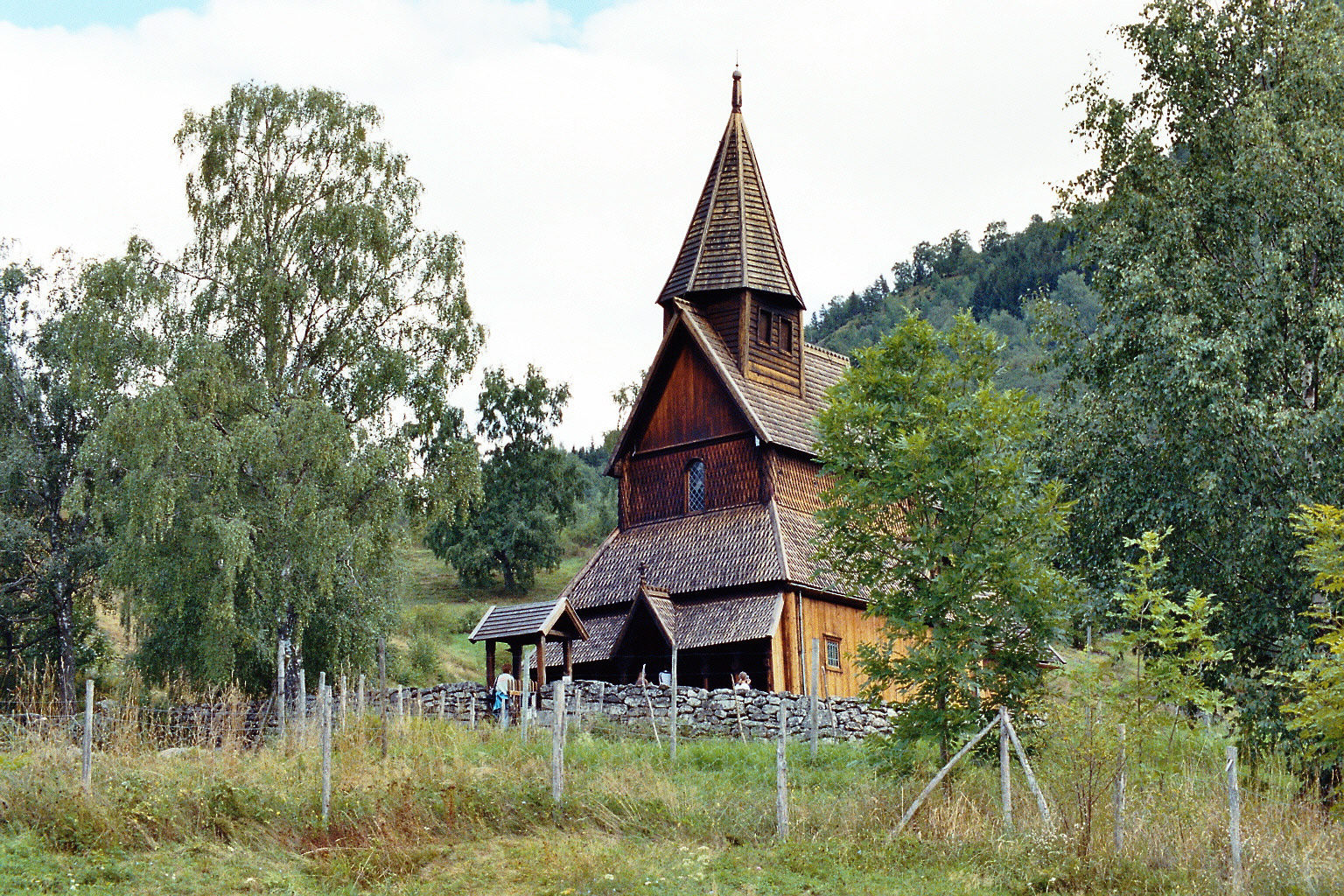
view of church and mountain

=== North wall carvings ===
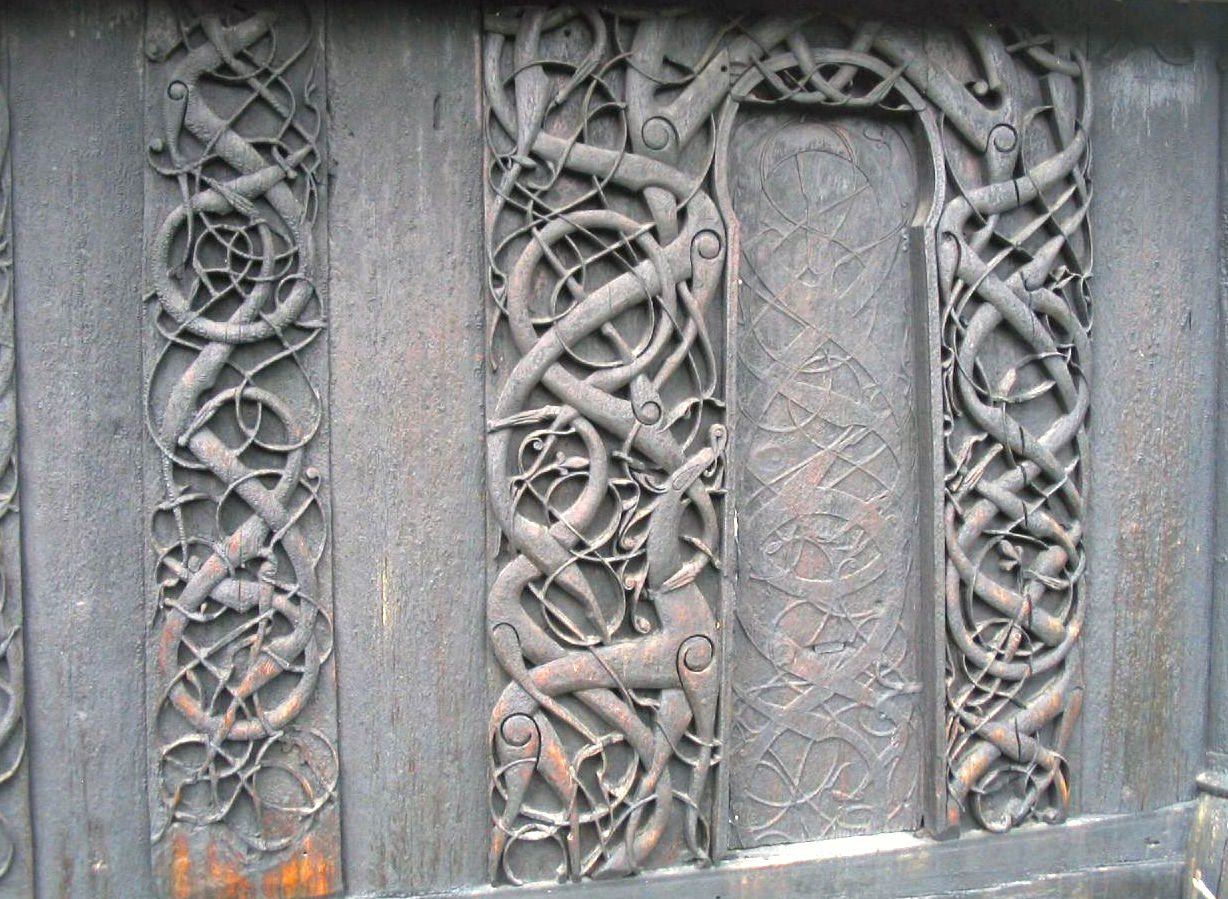
Carvings on door jambs and a wall plank of the north wall

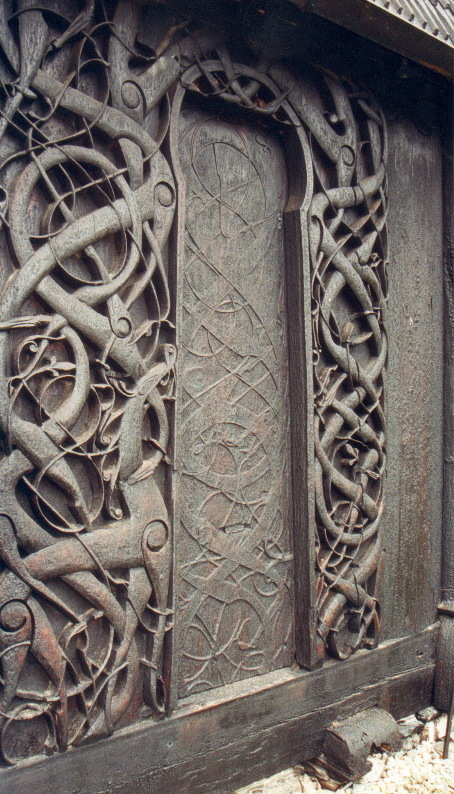
North door with carved doorjambs

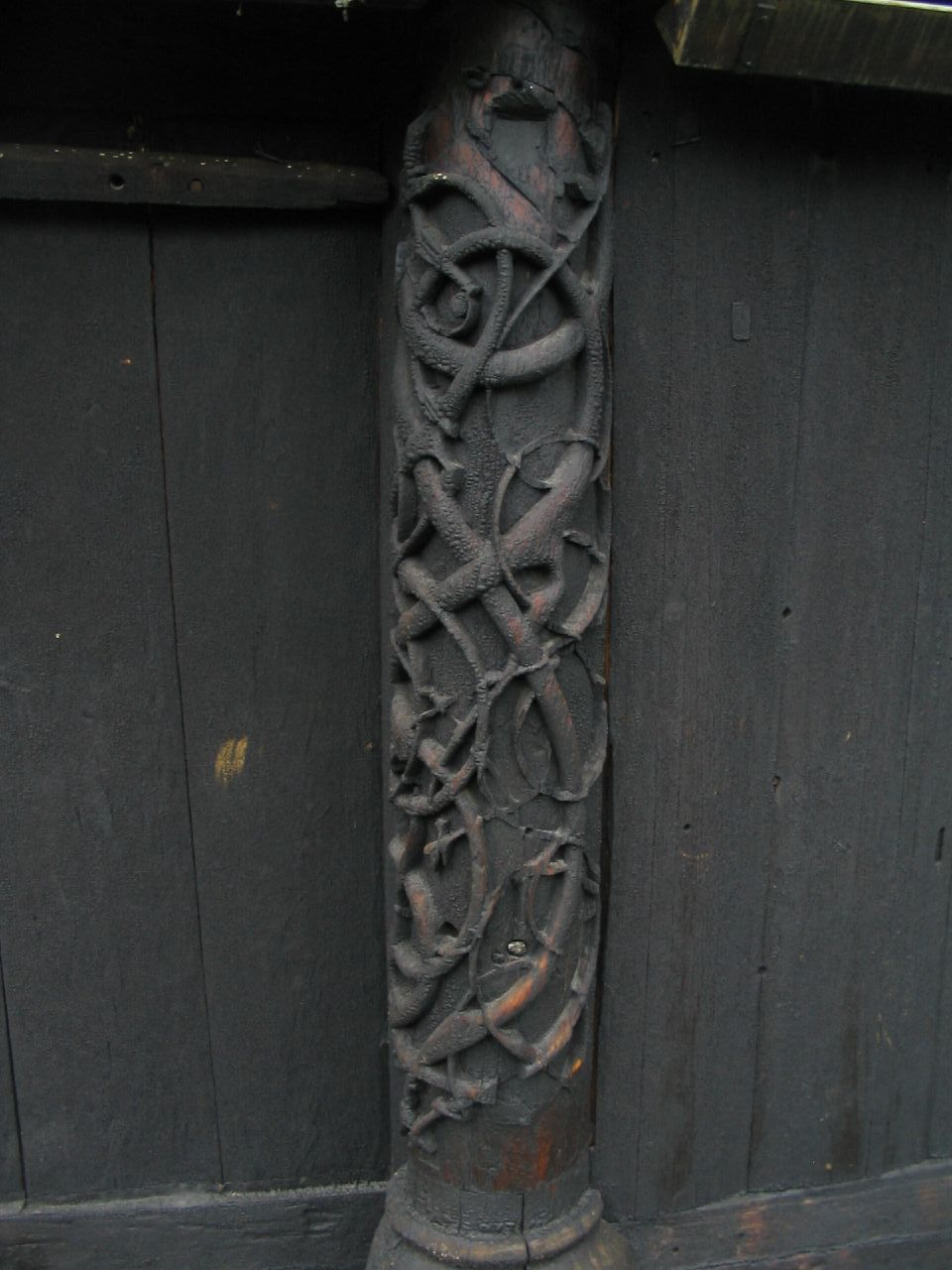
Corner column (from one of the earlier churches) on the north wall

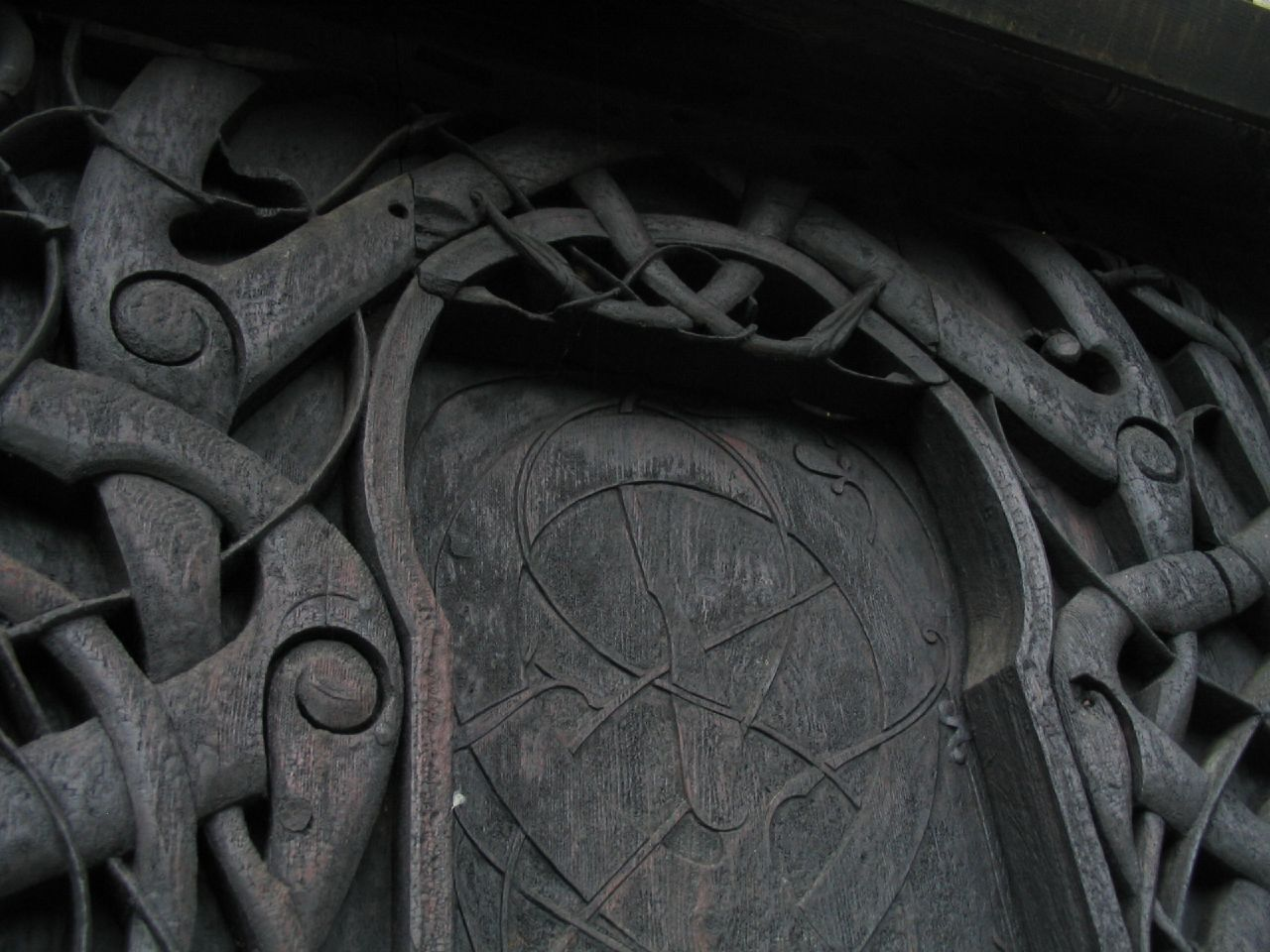
Lintel of the north door

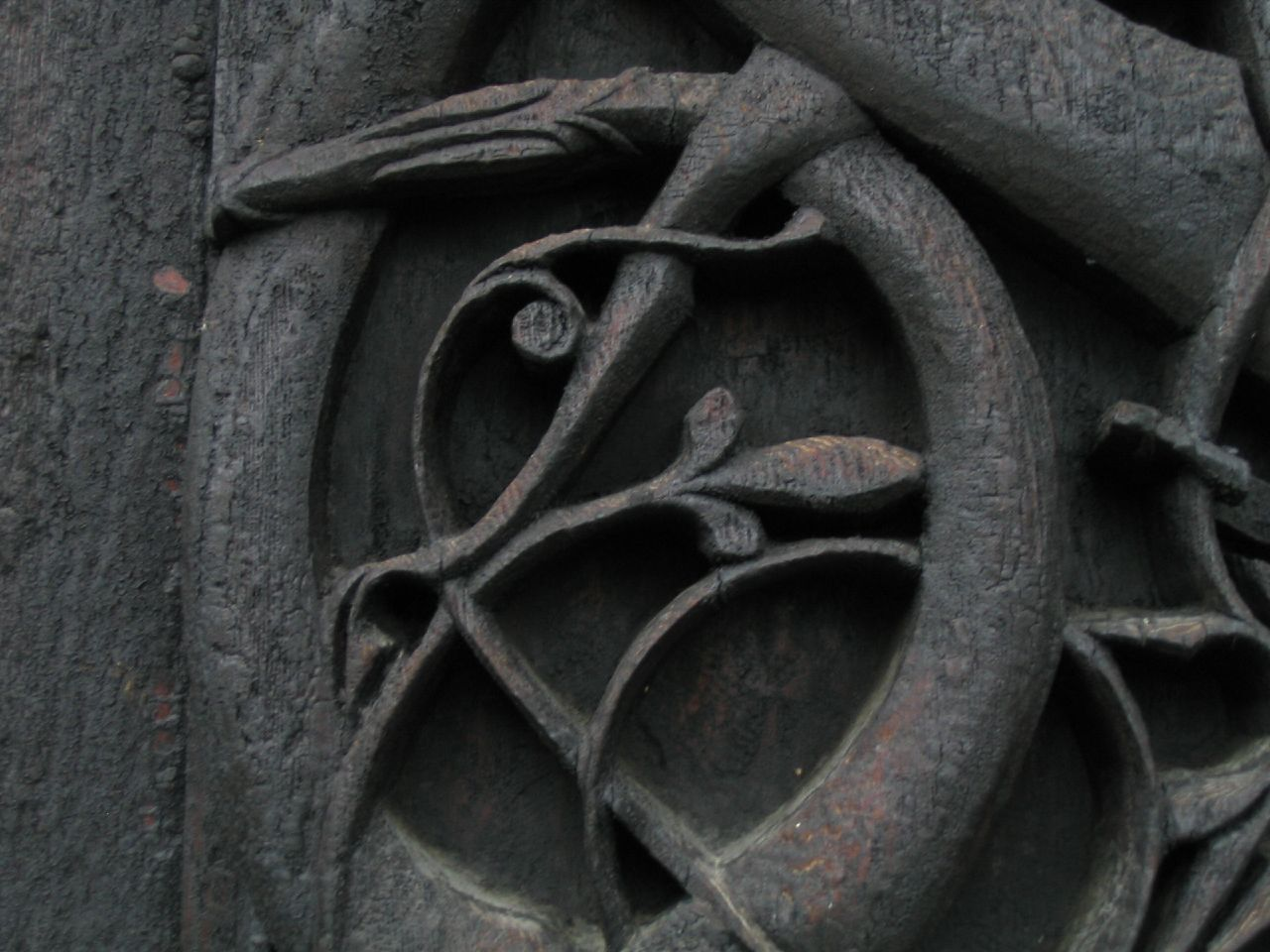
Detail of carving on the left jamb of the north door

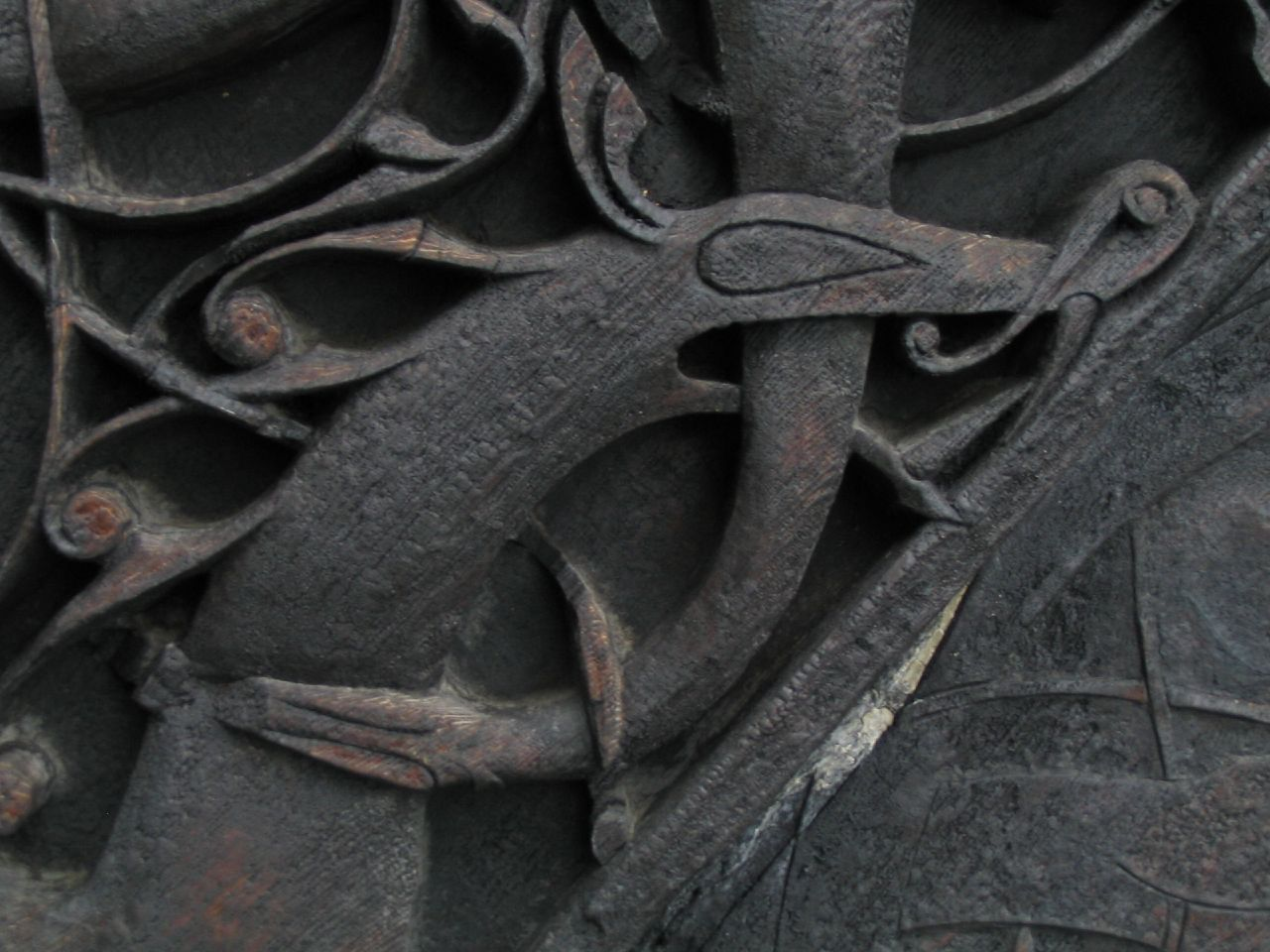
Detail of carving on left jamb of north door

=== Interior ===
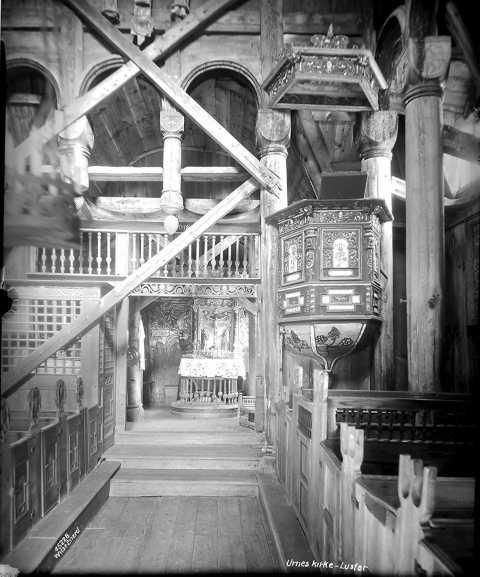
Interior view of the church, 1937

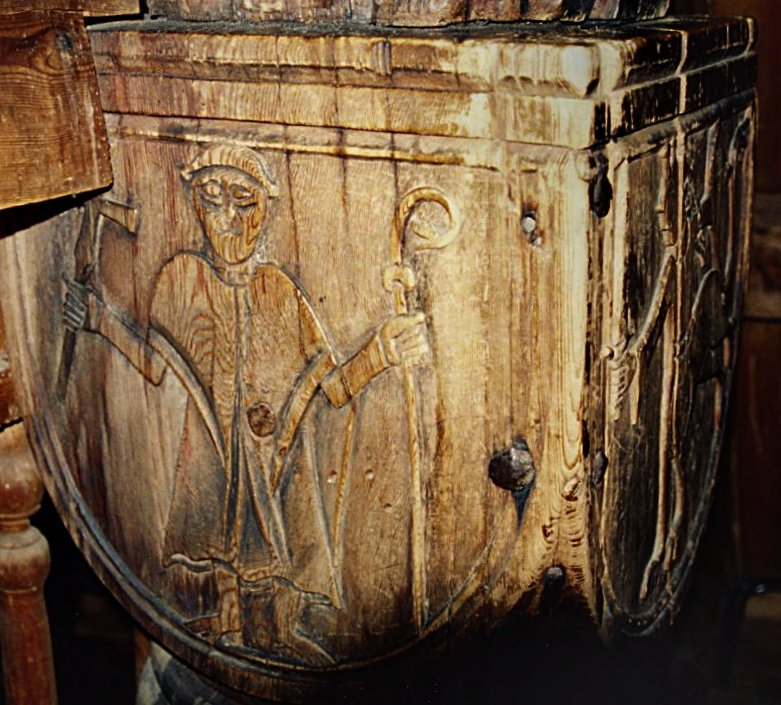
Capital depicting a medieval pilgrim

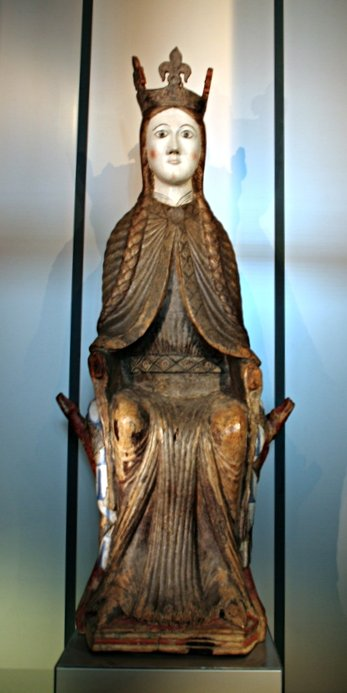
Figure of the Madonna

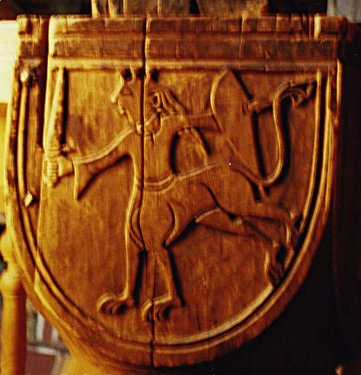
Capital depicting an armed centaur

== Literature ==
- Krogh, Knud J. (2011). Urnesstilens kirke – Forgængeren for den nuværende kirke på Urnes (in Norwegian). Oslo. ISBN 978-82-530-3400-3.
