= Hafslo =

Hafslo may refer to:

== Places ==
- Hafslo (village), a village in Luster Municipality in Vestland county, Norway
- Hafslo Municipality, a former municipality in the old Sogn og Fjordane county, Norway
- Hafslo Church, a church in Luster Municipality in Vestland county, Norway
- Hafslo lake, or Hafslovatnet, a lake in Luster Municipality in Vestland county, Norway
