= Hafslo Municipality =

Former municipality in Sogn og Fjordane county, Norway

Hafslo Municipality Hafslo herad
- Former municipality
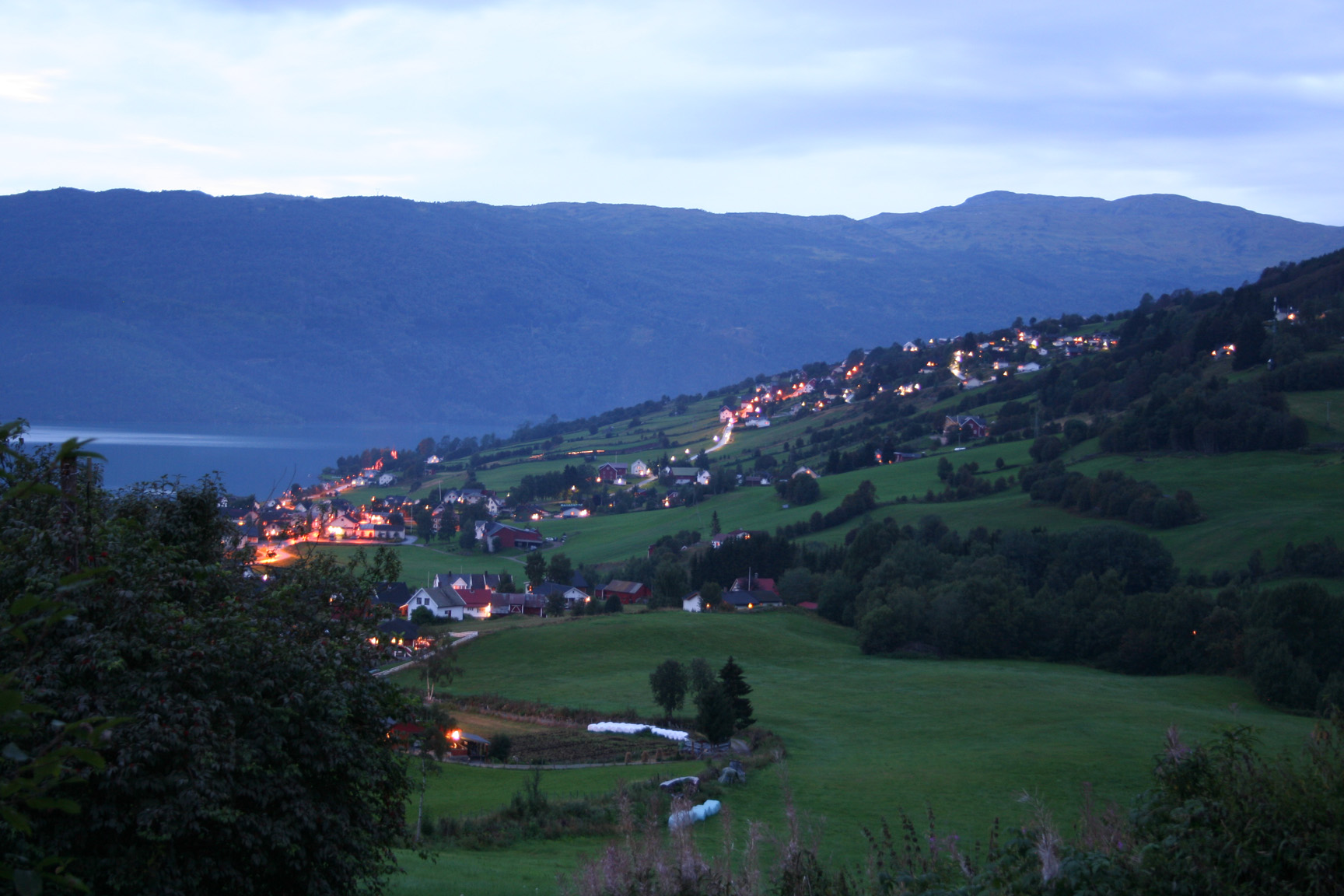
- View of Hafslo

- Sogn og Fjordane within Norway

- Hafslo within Sogn og Fjordane
- Coordinates: 61°18′39″N 07°11′08″E
- Country: Norway
- County: Sogn og Fjordane
- District: Sogn
- Established: 1 Jan 1838
  - Created as: Formannskapsdistrikt
- Disestablished: 1 Jan 1963
  - Succeeded by: Luster Municipality
- Administrative centre: Hafslo

Government
  - Mayor (1961–1963): Hans H. Sjøtun

Area (upon dissolution)
  - Total: 604.99 km^{2} (233.59 sq mi)
  - Rank: #164 in Norway
- Highest elevation: 1,957 m (6,421 ft)

Population (1962)
  - Total: 2,417
  - Rank: #383 in Norway
  - Density: 4/km^{2} (10/sq mi)
  - Change (10 years): ▼ −10.7%
- Demonym: Hafslobygding

Official language
  - Norwegian form: Nynorsk
- Time zone: UTC+01:00 (CET)
  - Summer (DST): UTC+02:00 (CEST)
- ISO 3166 code: NO-1425

Hafslo is a former municipality in the old Sogn og Fjordane county, Norway. The 605-square-kilometre (234 sq mi) municipality existed from 1838 until its dissolution in 1963. The area is now part of Luster Municipality in the traditional district of Sogn in Vestland county. The administrative centre was the village of Hafslo. Other villages in the municipality included Kinsedalen, Ornes, and Kroken (on the south side of the fjord and the villages of Solvorn, Joranger, and Veitastrond on the north side of the Lustrafjorden.

Prior to its dissolution in 1963, the 604.99-square-kilometre (233.59 sq mi) municipality was the 164th largest by area out of the 705 municipalities in Norway. Hafslo Municipality was the 383rd most populous municipality in Norway with a population of about 2,417. The municipality's population density was 4 inhabitants per square kilometre (10/sq mi) and its population had decreased by 10.7% over the previous 10-year period.

== General information ==
The parish of Hafslo was established as a municipality on 1 January 1838 (see formannskapsdistrikt law). During the 1960s, there were many municipal mergers across Norway due to the work of the Schei Committee. On 1 January 1963, Hafslo Municipality (population: 2,384) was merged with the neighboring Luster Municipality (population: 2,674) and Jostedal Municipality (population: 796) to form a new, larger Luster Municipality.

=== Name ===
The municipality (originally the parish) is named after the old Hafslo farm (Old Norse: Hafrsló) since the first Hafslo Church was built there. The first element is the old male name Hafr, the name is identical with the word hafr which means "male goat". The last element is ló which means "clearing" or "meadow", probably due to the excellent farming areas nearby.

=== Churches ===
The Church of Norway had four parishes (sokn) within Hafslo Municipality. At the time of the municipal dissolution, it was part of the Hafslo prestegjeld and the Indre Sogn prosti (deanery) in the Diocese of Bjørgvin.

Churches in Hafslo Municipality
Parish (sokn)	Church name	Location of the church	Year built
Fet	Fet Church	Fet	1894
Hafslo	Hafslo Church	Hafslo	1878
Hafslo	Veitastrond Chapel	Veitastrond	1928
Joranger	Joranger Church	Joranger	1660
Solvorn	Solvorn Church	Solvorn	1883
Solvorn	Urnes Stave Church	Ornes	1130

== Geography ==
The municipality surrounded the lakes Hafslovatnet and Veitastrondvatnet. The highest point in the municipality was the 1,957-metre (6,421 ft) tall mountain Høgste Breakulen on the Jostedalsbreen glacier and on the border with Stryn Municipality.

Innvik Municipality and Stryn Municipality were located to the north, Luster Municipality was to the east, Årdal Municipality was to the southeast, Sogndal Municipality was to the south, Balestrand Municipality was to the west, and Jølster Municipality was to the northwest.

== Government ==
While it existed, Hafslo Municipality was responsible for primary education (through 10th grade), outpatient health services, senior citizen services, welfare and other social services, zoning, economic development, and municipal roads and utilities. The municipality was governed by a municipal council of directly elected representatives. The mayor was indirectly elected by a vote of the municipal council. The municipality was under the jurisdiction of the Gulating Court of Appeal.

=== Municipal council ===
The municipal council (Heradsstyre) of Hafslo Municipality was made up of 21 representatives that were elected to four year terms. The tables below show the historical composition of the council by political party.

Hafslo heradsstyre 1959–1963
Party name (in Nynorsk)	Number of representatives
Labour Party (Arbeidarpartiet)	7
Conservative Party (Høgre)	2
Christian Democratic Party (Kristeleg Folkeparti)	3
Centre Party (Senterpartiet)	5
Liberal Party (Venstre)	3
Local List(s) (Lokale lister)	1
Total number of members:	21
Note: On 1 January 1963, Hafslo Municipality became part of Luster Municipality.

Hafslo heradsstyre 1955–1959
Party name (in Nynorsk)	Number of representatives
Labour Party (Arbeidarpartiet)	7
Conservative Party (Høgre)	3
Christian Democratic Party (Kristeleg Folkeparti)	3
Farmers' Party (Bondepartiet)	5
Liberal Party (Venstre)	3
Total number of members:	21

Hafslo heradsstyre 1951–1955
Party name (in Nynorsk)	Number of representatives
Labour Party (Arbeidarpartiet)	9
Conservative Party (Høgre)	5
Farmers' Party (Bondepartiet)	8
Joint List(s) of Non-Socialist Parties (Borgarlege Felleslister)	6
Total number of members:	28

Hafslo heradsstyre 1947–1951
Party name (in Nynorsk)	Number of representatives
Labour Party (Arbeidarpartiet)	4
Christian Democratic Party (Kristeleg Folkeparti)	1
Farmers' Party (Bondepartiet)	2
List of workers, fishermen, and small farmholders (Arbeidarar, fiskarar, småbrukarar liste)	5
Joint List(s) of Non-Socialist Parties (Borgarlege Felleslister)	6
Local List(s) (Lokale lister)	10
Total number of members:	28

Hafslo heradsstyre 1945–1947
Party name (in Nynorsk)	Number of representatives
Labour Party (Arbeidarpartiet)	4
Liberal Party (Venstre)	2
List of workers, fishermen, and small farmholders (Arbeidarar, fiskarar, småbrukarar liste)	9
Local List(s) (Lokale lister)	13
Total number of members:	28

Hafslo heradsstyre 1937–1941*
Party name (in Nynorsk)	Number of representatives
Labour Party (Arbeidarpartiet)	6
Conservative Party (Høgre)	1
Farmers' Party (Bondepartiet)	7
Liberal Party (Venstre)	4
List of workers, fishermen, and small farmholders (Arbeidarar, fiskarar, småbrukarar liste)	1
Joint List(s) of Non-Socialist Parties (Borgarlege Felleslister)	4
Local List(s) (Lokale lister)	5
Total number of members:	28
Note: Due to the German occupation of Norway during World War II, no elections were held for new municipal councils until after the war ended in 1945.

=== Mayors ===
The mayor (Nynorsk: ordførar) of Hafslo Municipality was the political leader of the municipality and the chairperson of the municipal council. The following people held this position:

- 1838–1839: Ola Trondsen Lid
- 1840–1847: E.J. Falkegjerde
- 1848–1859: Einar Joranger
- 1860–1877: Samuel M. Bugge
- 1878–1881: Einar Joranger
- 1882–1885: Samuel M. Bugge
- 1886–1895: Ola I. Hillestad
- 1896–1898: Anders J. Tørvi
- 1899–1904: Erik Nitter Walaker
- 1905–1907: Samuel O. Moe
- 1908–1910: Erik Nitter Walaker
- 1911–1919: Ola I. Joranger
- 1920–1922: Wilken Nitter Walaker
- 1923–1928: Ivar O. Hillestad
- 1929–1931: Torstein Molland
- 1932–1937: J.W. Fraas
- 1938–1942: Torstein Molland
- 1942–1944: Amund Bremer
- 1945–1945: Torstein Molland
- 1946–1947: Ola Sjøtun
- 1948–1961: Einar Kjos
- 1961–1963: Hans H. Sjøtun

== Media gallery ==
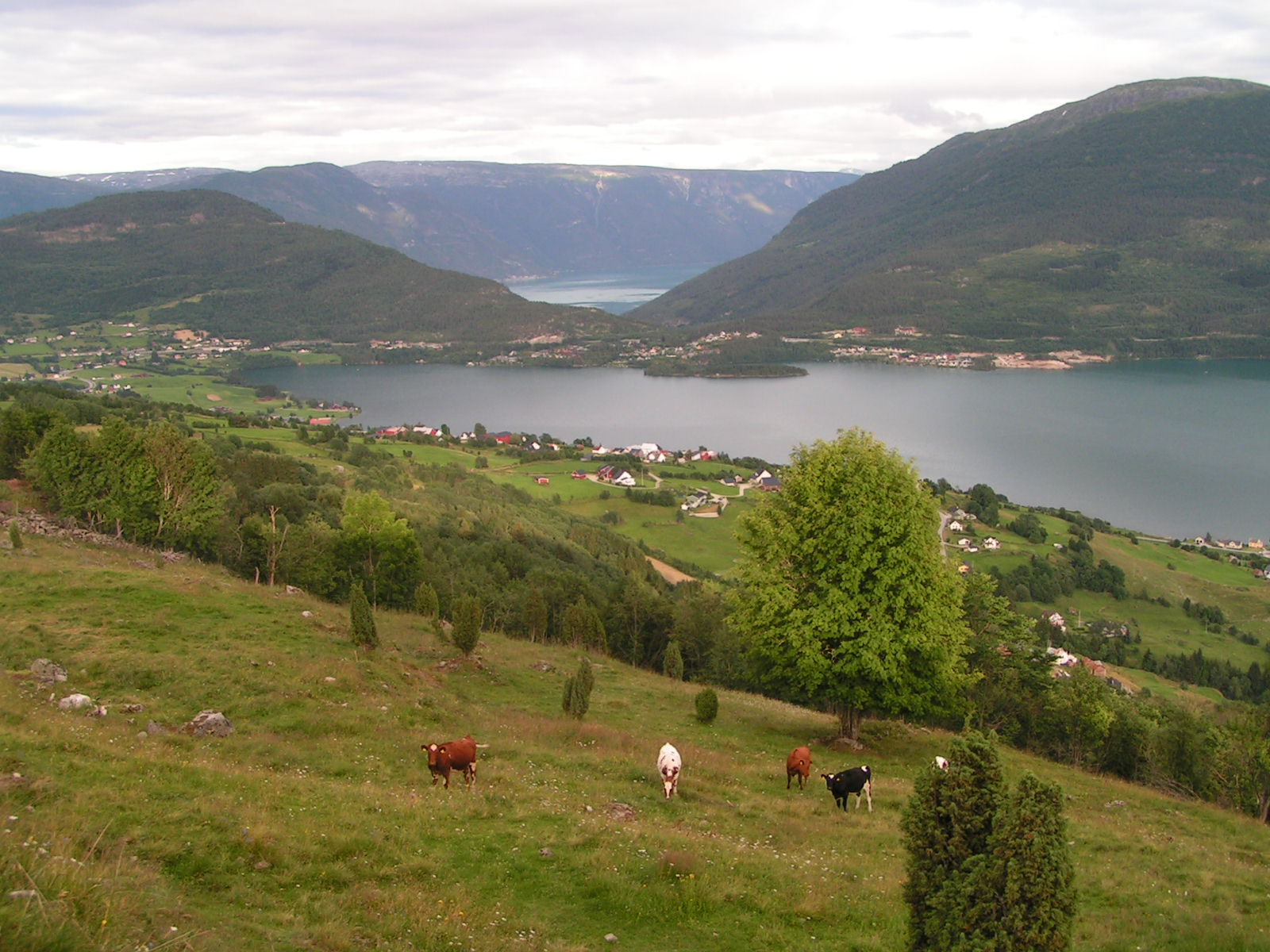
The Hafslo village area in the central part of the municipality

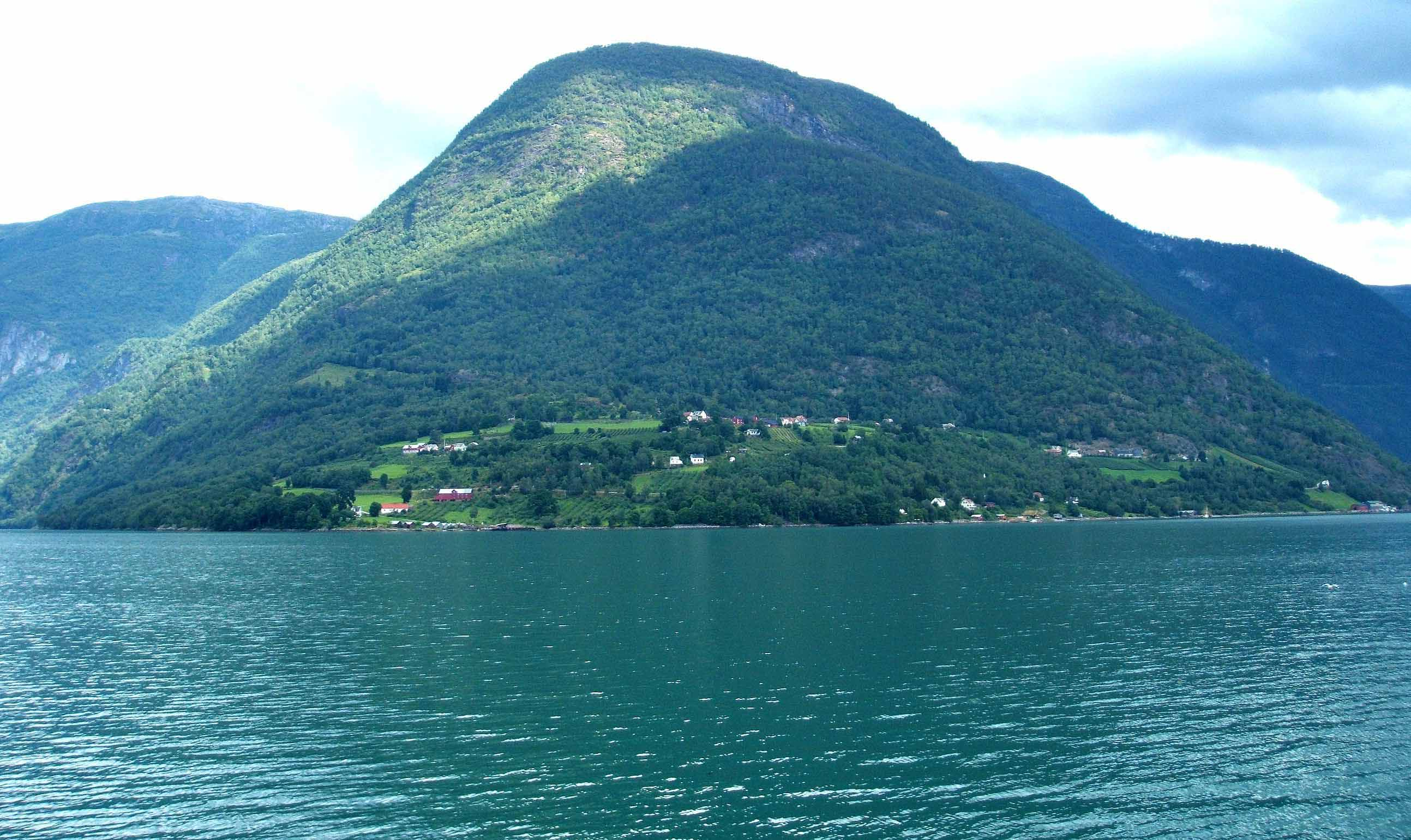
The Ornes area in eastern Hafslo municipality

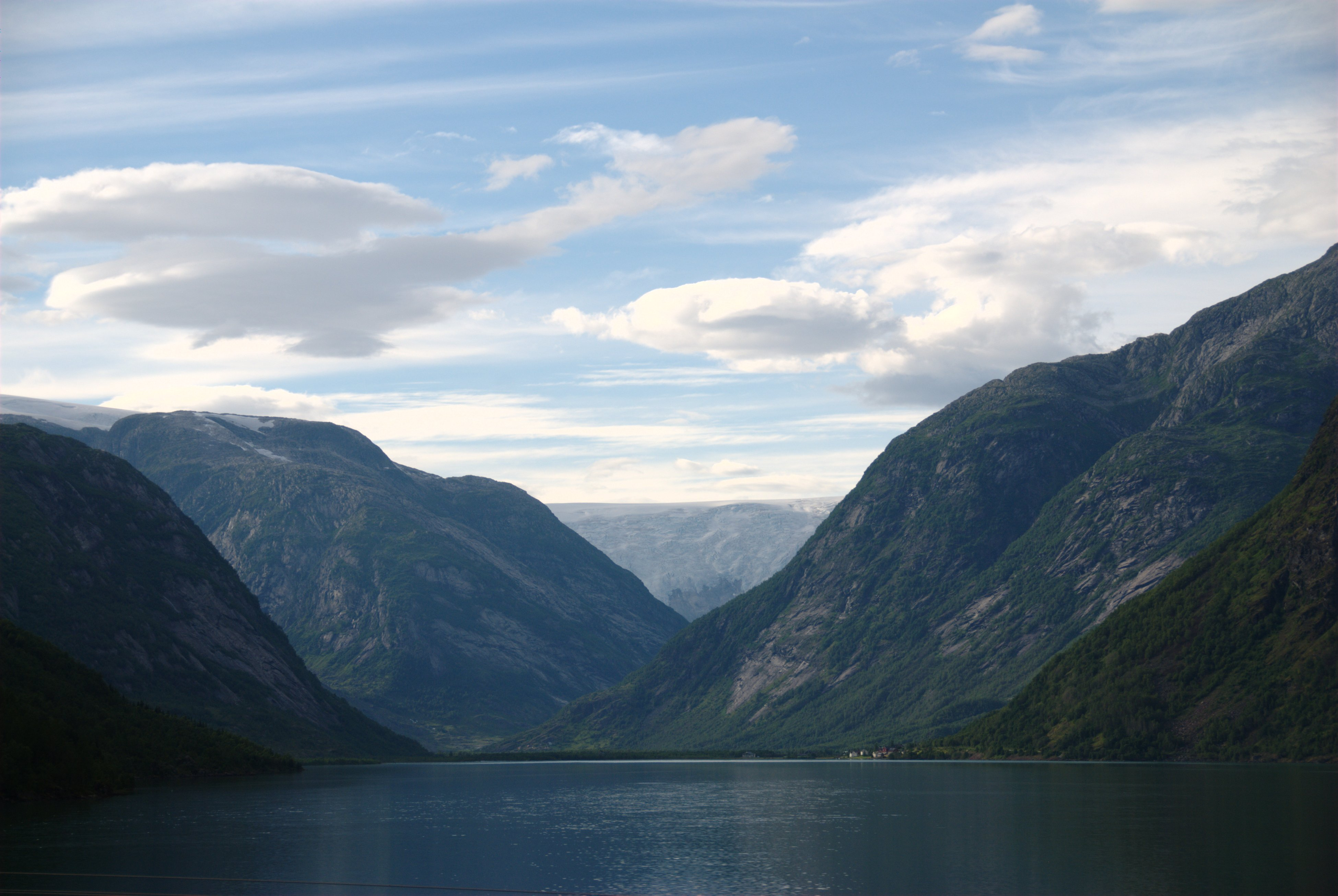
The Veitastrondsvatnet lake and the Jostedalsbreen glacier (northern end of the municipality

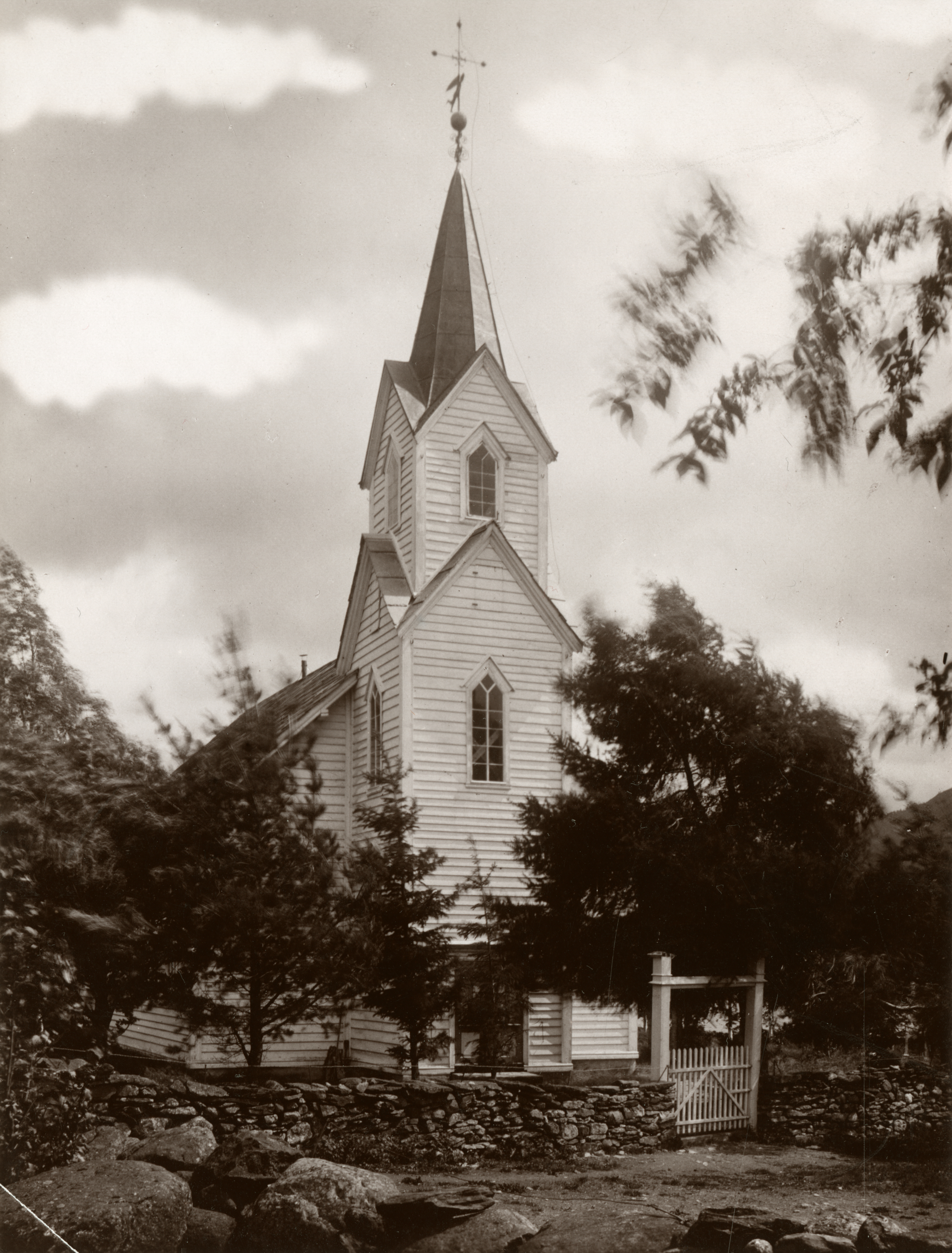
Hafslo Church

== Notable people ==
- Sylfest Lomheim (born 1945), a Norwegian linguist
- Jens Sterri (born 1923), a civil servant
- Kjellfred Weum (born 1940), a hurdler

== See also ==
- List of former municipalities of Norway
