= Crash (1974 film) =

- Directed by: Rolf Clemens
- Written by: Rolf Clemens
- Starring: Jan Solberg; Hanne Krogh; Henki Kolstad; Astrid Folstad
- Release date: 1974
- Running time: 90 minutes
- Country: Norway
- Language: Norwegian

Crash is a 1974 Norwegian drama film written and directed by Rolf Clemens, starring Jan Solberg and Hanne Krogh. A motorcycle accident leaves the young Jan (Solberg) paralysed. This new situation challenges his attitude towards life, and his relationship both with his parents and with his girlfriend Marianne (Krogh).
