= Hafslo (village) =

Village in Luster Municipality, Norway

- Village
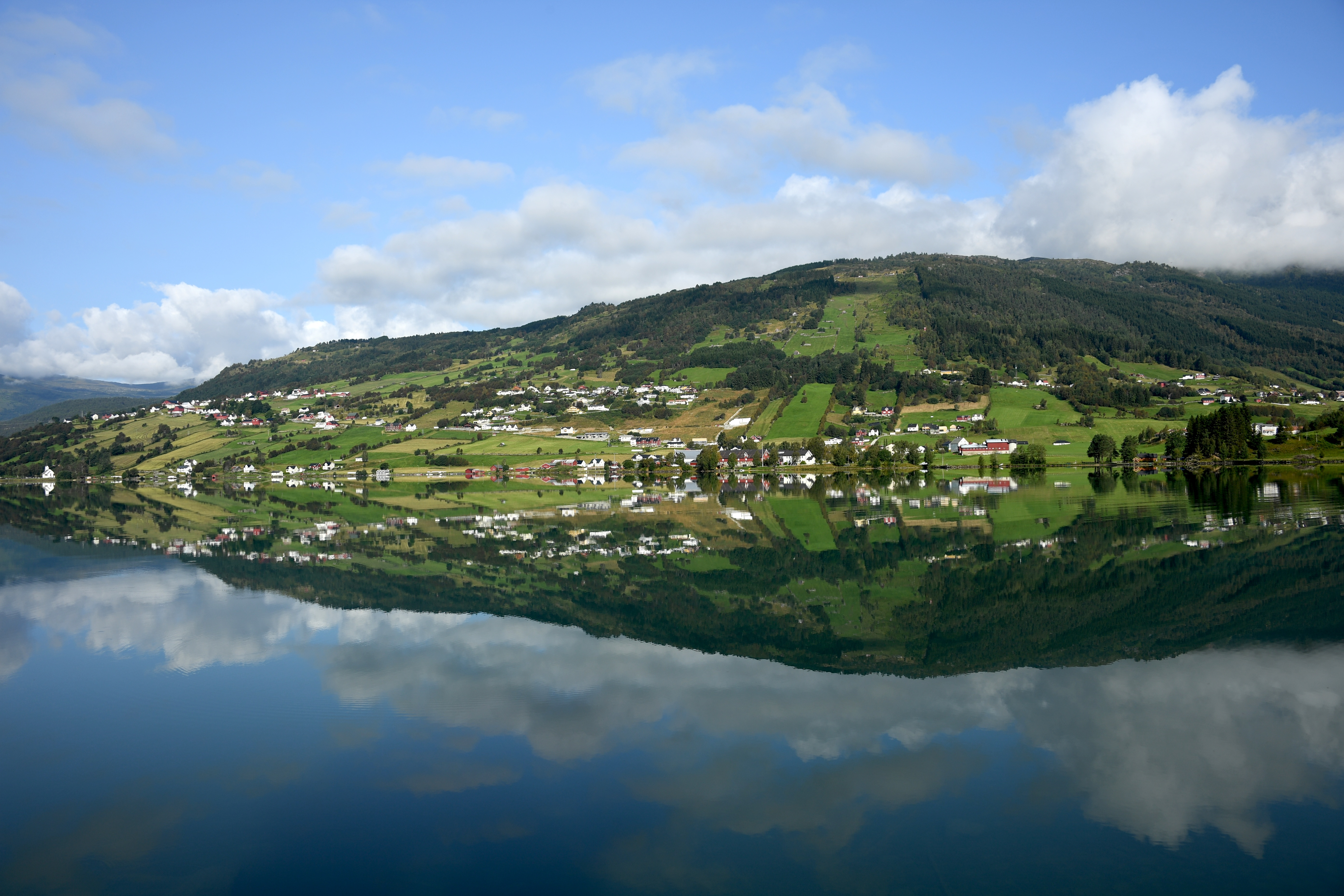
- View of the village from the southern shore of the lake Hafslovatnet
- Interactive map of Hafslo
- Location within Vestland Location within Norway
- Coordinates: 61.31539°N 7.20109°E
- Country: Norway
- Region: Western Norway
- County: Vestland
- District: Sogn
- Municipality: Luster Municipality

Area
  - Total: 1.13 km^{2} (0.44 sq mi)
- Elevation: 179 m (587 ft)

Population (2025)
  - Total: 1,248
  - Density: 1,104/km^{2} (2,860/sq mi)
- Time zone: UTC+01:00 (CET)
  - Summer (DST): UTC+02:00 (CEST)
- Post Code: 6869 Hafslo

Hafslo is a village in Luster Municipality in Vestland county, Norway. The village is located on the northern shore of the lake Hafslovatnet, about 3 kilometres (1.9 mi) northwest of the village of Solvorn which sits on the shores of the Lustrafjorden. The lake Veitastrondvatnet is located to the northwest of Hafslo. The village of Sogndalsfjøra (in Sogndal Municipality) lies 15 kilometres (9.3 mi) to the south; the village of Gaupne lies about 15 kilometres (9.3 mi) to the north; and the village of Veitastrond lies about 25 kilometres (16 mi) to the northwest. The Norwegian County Road 55 runs through the village on its way from Sogndalsfjøra to Gaupne.

The 1.13-square-kilometre (280-acre) village has a population (2025) of 1,248 and a population density of 1,104 inhabitants per square kilometre (2,860/sq mi).

== History ==
Historically, the village of Hafslo was the administrative centre of the old Hafslo Municipality which existed from 1838 until 1963. The 19th-century Hafslo Church, located in the village of Hafslo, was the main church for the municipality, and it still is the main church for the Hafslo parish.

=== Name ===
The name comes from the old Hafslo farm (Old Norse: Hafrsló), since Hafslo Church was located there. The first element of the name comes from the old male name Hafr or from the word for "goat" (also hafr). The second element of the name comes from the Old Norse word ló meaning "meadow", probably due to the excellent farming areas nearby.

== Notable people ==
- Sylfest Lomheim (born 1945), a Norwegian linguist
- Jens Sterri (born 1923), a civil servant
- Kjellfred Weum (born 1940), a hurdler

== Media gallery ==
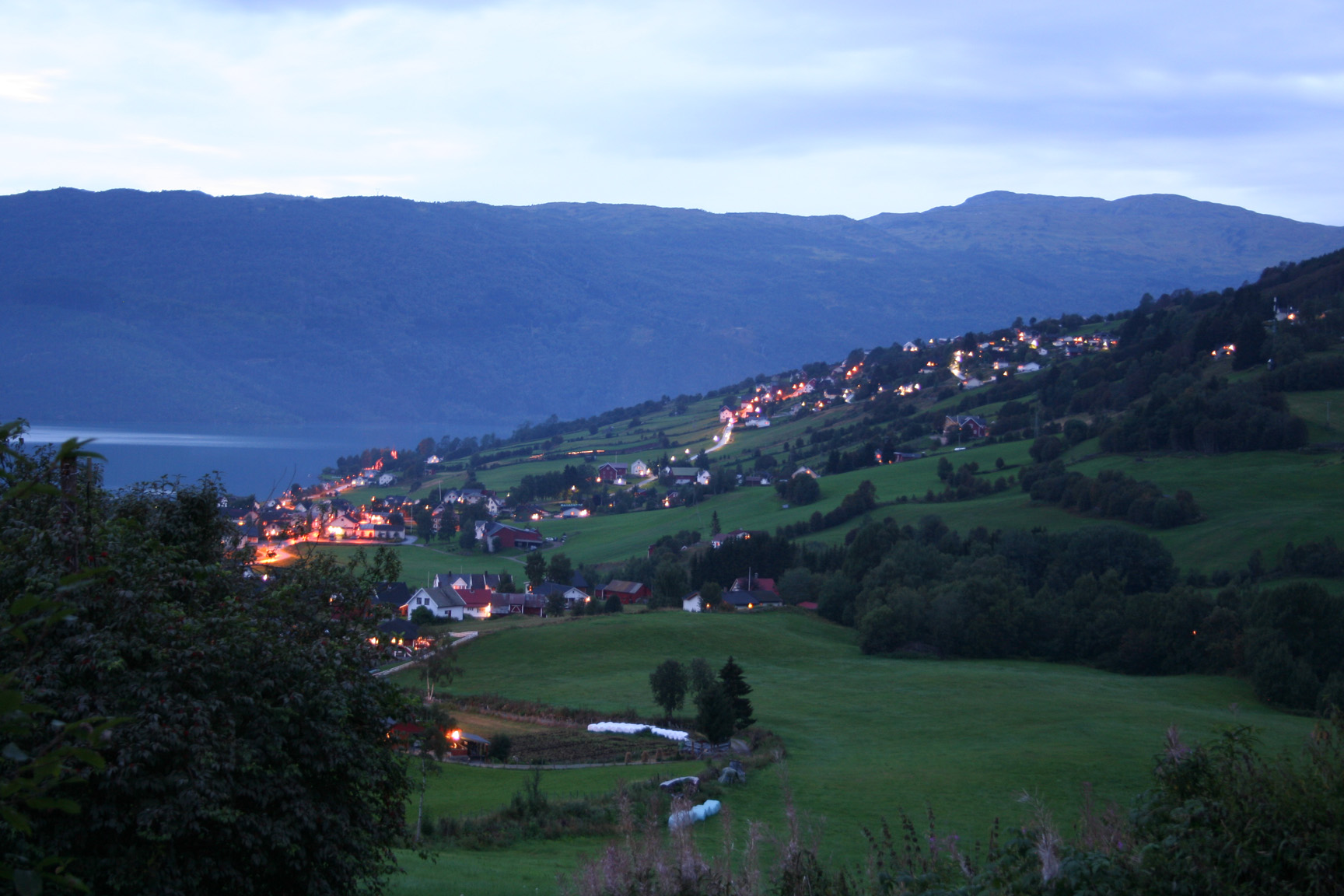
View of the village

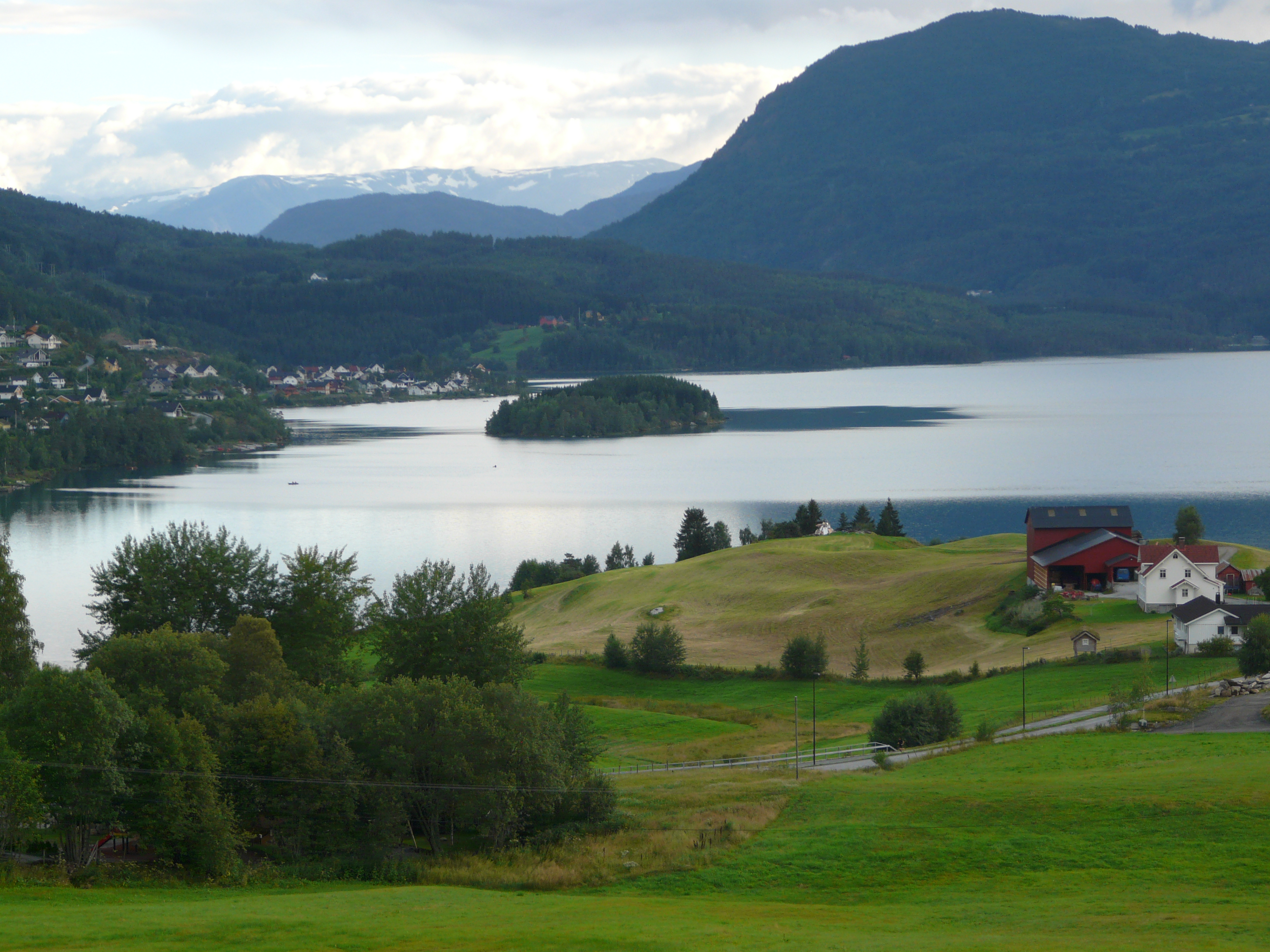
View of Hafslo (looking south)

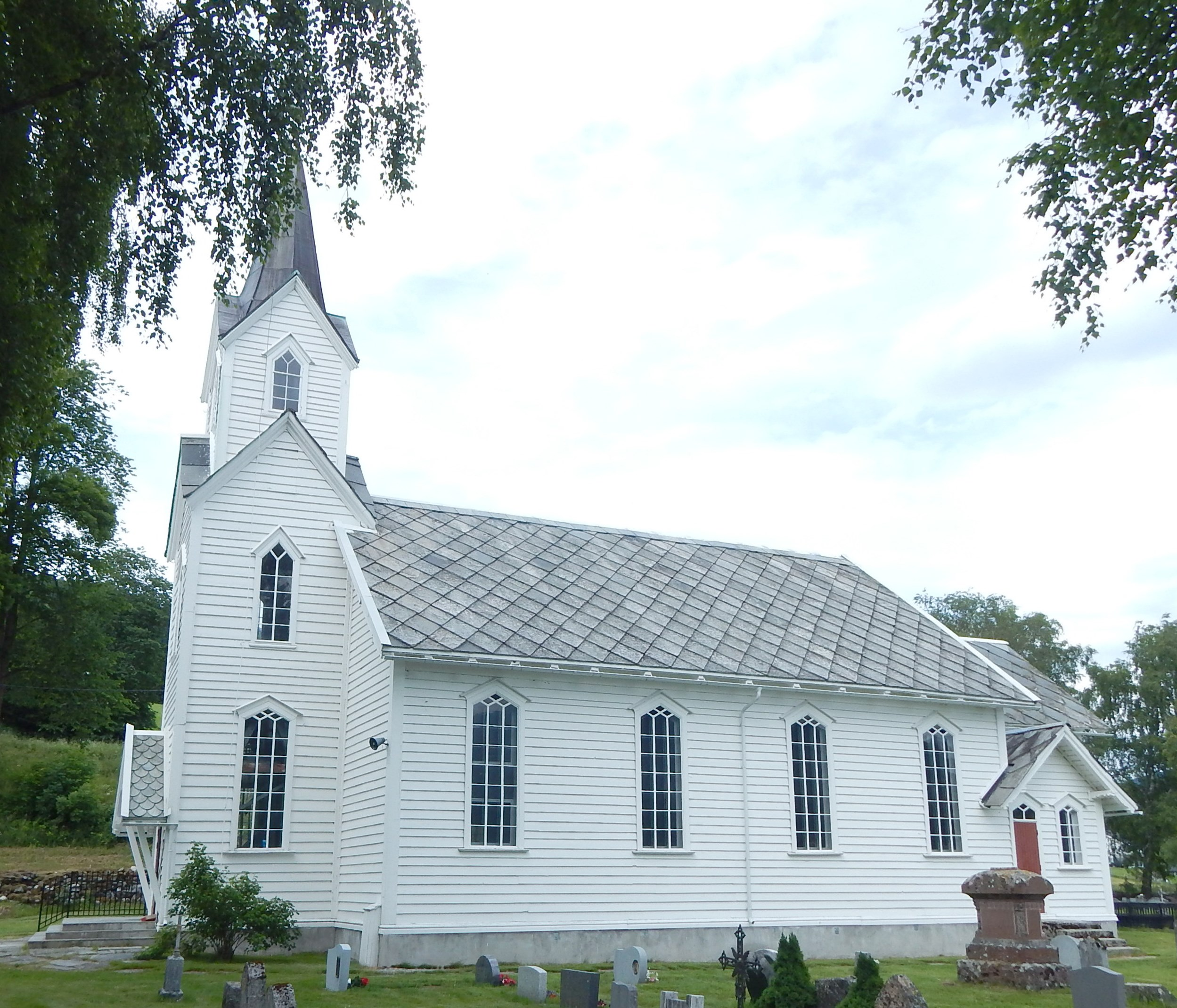
View of Hafslo Church
