= Sterri =

Sterri is a surname. Notable people with the surname include:

- Jens Sterri (1923–2008), Norwegian civil servant
- Siri Frost Sterri (born 1944), Norwegian politician
- Tom Sterri (born 1960), Norwegian actor
