= Marit Wiig =

Norwegian civil servant and organizational leader

Marit Wiig (born 14 October 1949) is a Norwegian civil servant and organizational leader.

A cand.jur. by education, she worked as deputy under-secretary of State in the Ministry of Consumer Affairs and Administration from 1986 to 1990. She then worked for the Norges Postsparebank from 1990 and the World Bank from 1992; she returned as CEO of Postbanken from 1994 to 1995. She worked for the Confederation of Norwegian Enterprise from 1995 to 1999 and as director of the Norwegian Customs and Excise Authorities from 1999 to 2007. During parts of her tenure, Øystein Haraldsen was acting director.

In her younger days she was a handball player, winning several national league titles with her club IL Vestar. She remained in sports after retiring, as vice president of the Norwegian Handball Federation from 1984 to 1988, member of the board of the Norwegian Confederation of Sports from 1987 to 1990 and vice president from 1990 to 1994. She was succeeded by Tove Strand as vice president. Furthermore, Wiig was a board member of the Norwegian Olympic Committee from 1988 to 1994 as well as for LOOC, the Lillehammer Olympic Organising Committee.

Civic offices
Preceded by Frida Nokken	Director of the Norwegian Customs and Excise Authorities; 1999–2007	Succeeded by Bjørn Røse
