= Bjørn Røse =

Norwegian civil servant (born 1951)

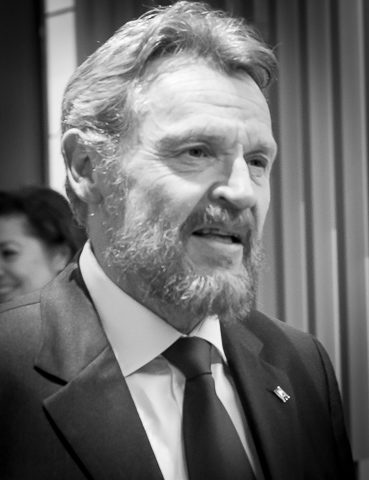
Bjørn Røse in 2016

Bjørn Røse (born 24 April 1951) is a Norwegian civil servant.

A siviløkonom by education, he graduated from the Norwegian School of Economics and Business Administration in 1974. He worked in Oslo municipality from 1989 to 2007, the last year as acting city director. In 2007 he was hired as director of the Norwegian Customs and Excise Authorities, replacing Marit Wiig, who had sat through the maximum of eight years. During parts of her tenure, Øystein Haraldsen had been acting director.

Preceded by Marit Wiig	Director of the Norwegian Customs and Excise Authorities; 2007–present	Incumbent
