= Frida Nokken =

Norwegian civil servant

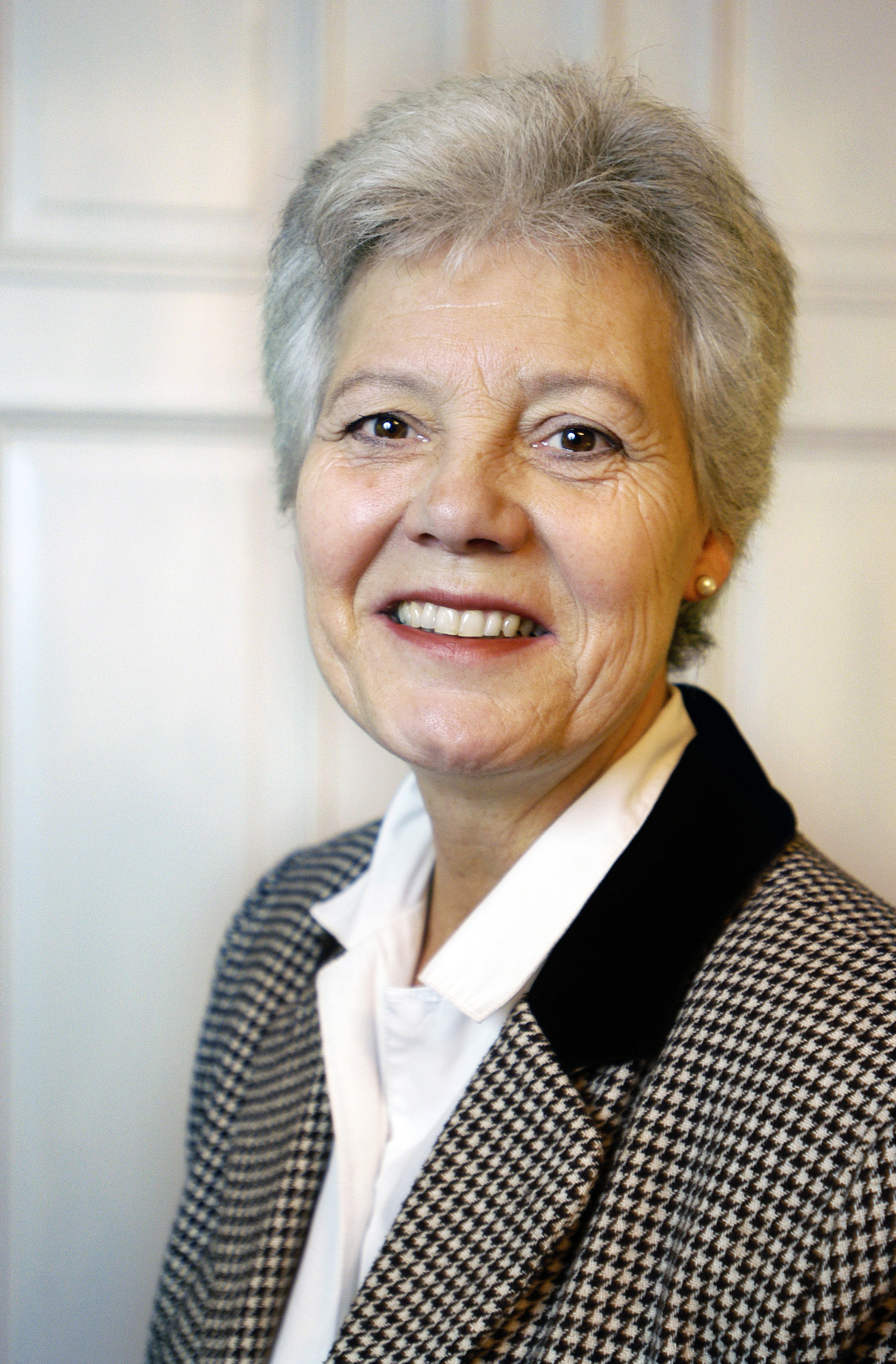

Frida Nokken (born 20 September 1948) is a Norwegian civil servant.

She was born in Fredrikstad. A cand.polit. by education, she worked for Statskonsult from 1975, the Financial Supervisory Authority from 1989 and Posten Norge from 1992. From 1995 to 1999 she served as director of the Norwegian Customs and Excise Authorities. From 1999 to 2007 she was the secretary-general of the Nordic Council.

Preceded by Jan Solberg	Director of the Norwegian Customs and Excise Authorities; 1995–1999	Succeeded by Marit Wiig
Preceded by Berglind Ásgeirsdóttir	Secretary-General of the Nordic Council; 1999–2007	Succeeded by Jan-Erik Enestam
