= Veitastrond Chapel =

Church in Vestland, Norway

- Veitastrond kapell
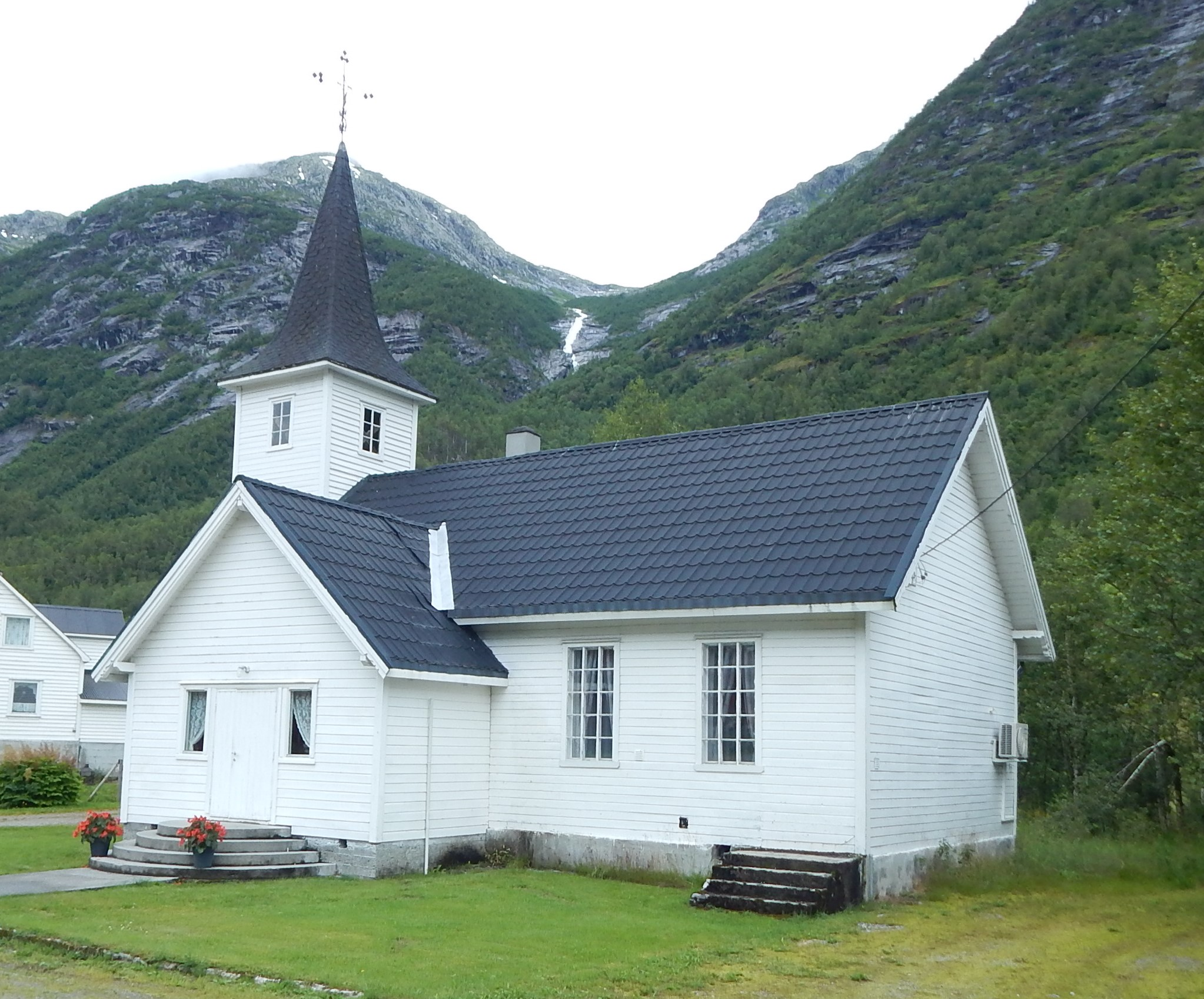
- View of the chapel
- Veitastrond Chapel
- 61°29′01″N 7°01′57″E
- Location: Luster Municipality, Vestland
- Country: Norway
- Denomination: Church of Norway
- Churchmanship: Evangelical Lutheran

History
- Status: Chapel
- Founded: 1935
- Consecrated: 14 July 1935

Architecture
- Functional status: Active
- Architectural type: Long church
- Completed: 1928 (98 years ago)

Specifications
- Capacity: 120
- Materials: Wood

Administration
- Diocese: Bjørgvin bispedømme
- Deanery: Sogn prosti
- Parish: Hafslo
- Norwegian Cultural Heritage Site
- Type: Church
- Status: Not protected
- ID: 85797

Veitastrond Chapel (Norwegian: Veitastrond kapell) is a chapel in Luster Municipality in Vestland county, Norway. It is located in the village of Veitastrond. It is an annex chapel in the Hafslo parish which is part of the Sogn prosti (deanery) in the Diocese of Bjørgvin. The white, wooden chapel was built as a bedehus in 1928. The chapel seats about 120 people.

== History ==
In 1891, the village of Veidastrond received permission to build a cemetery. The people still continued to ask for their own chapel. In 1928, a small bedehus (prayer house) was built in the village. On 14 July 1935, it was consecrated for use for church functions and received the designation of chapel. Before that time, the villagers had to make the 30-kilometre (19 mi) long trek from their isolated village to Hafslo Church, which was a long and sometimes dangerous journey. In 1960, a new entrance was built for the chapel. In the early 1970s, the building was expanded by adding a bathroom.

== See also ==
- List of churches in Bjørgvin
