= Karl-Edwin Manshaus =

Karl-Edwin Manshaus (born 19 February 1940) is a Norwegian businessperson and civil servant.

He was born in Bergen, and holds the cand.jur. degree. He was hired in the Norwegian Ministry of Industry in 1970, then in the Norwegian Ministry of Petroleum and Energy in 1978 where he became deputy under-secretary of state. From 1984 to 1987 he served as counsellor in energy affairs at the Norwegian embassy in the United States. From 1988 to 2004 he was the permanent under-secretary of state in the Ministry of Petroleum and Energy, the highest-ranking bureaucratic position. Because of a reorganization, his ministry was merged to form the Ministry of Industry and Energy in 1993, but a Ministry of Petroleum and Energy was re-formed in 1997.

In 2004 he was hired in ConocoPhillips. He is also the chair of Manshaus Consulting. He was decorated as a Knight, First Class of the Royal Norwegian Order of St. Olav and a Chevalier of the Legion of Honour.

Civic offices
Preceded by Erik Himle	Permanent under-secretary of state in the Norwegian Ministry of Petroleum and Energy; 1988–1992	Succeeded by position abolished
Preceded by ?? (acting)	Permanent under-secretary of state in the Norwegian Ministry of Industry and Energy; 1993–1996	Succeeded by Odd L. Fosseidbråten
Preceded by position created	Permanent under-secretary of state in the Norwegian Ministry of Petroleum and Energy; 1997–2004	Succeeded by Elisabeth Berge
