= Berglind Ásgeirsdóttir =

Icelandic diplomat

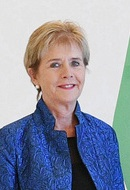
- Ásgeirsdóttir in 2018

Ambassador of Iceland to the Russian Federation with accreditation to Belarus
- In office 2016–2020
- Prime Minister: Sigurður Ingi Jóhannsson; Bjarni Benediktsson; Katrín Jakobsdóttir
- Succeeded by: Árni Þór Sigurðsson

Personal details
- Born: 15 January 1955 (age 71) Ólafsvík, Iceland
- Children: 3

Berglind Ásgeirsdóttir (born 15 January 1955 in Ólafsvík) is an Icelandic diplomat. Berglind has served as Secretary-General of the Nordic Council, Secretary-General in the Icelandic Ministry of Social Affairs, Permanent Representative of Iceland to UNESCO. From 2016 to 2020 Berglind was Iceland's Ambassador to Russia and became the first Icelandic Ambassador in Belarus in over ten years. She has also served as Ambassador to France, Italy, Spain and North Africa.

== Career ==
Berglind was the Secretary-General of the Nordic Council from 1996 to 1999 and the Secretary-General in the Ministry of Social Affairs in Iceland from 1988 to 1996 and again from 1999 to 2002. From September 2002 to 2006, Berglind was Deputy Secretary-General of the Organisation for Economic Co-operation and Development (OECD).

From 2006 to 2007, Berglind was the Director-General of the Trade Office at the Ministry for Foreign Affairs, succeeding Grétar Má Sigurðsson, and also Iceland's Permanent Representative to UNESCO. Among her responsibilities were the areas of education, health, labour and social policy and public communication. In this role, she additionally encouraged Japan to accept more foreign workers and immigrants to meet labour shortages.

In 2009, Berglind was Secretary of State for the Ministry of Health.

From March 2011 to August 2016 Berglind served as Icelandic Ambassador to France, Italy, Spain, Andorra, Monaco and the North African countries of Algeria, Morocco, Lebanon, Tunisia and Djibouti. She was also Iceland's permanent representative to the OECD, UNESCO and the Council of Europe.

In 2016, Berglind considered running for the Presidency in Iceland, but chose not to run.

From 2016 to 2020 Berglind was Iceland's Ambassador to the Russian Federation, presenting her credentials to President of Russia Vladimir Putin. During her tenure as Ambassador, she met with the Ambassador of Belarus to Russia, Igor Petrishenko, to discuss the promotion of Belarus-Iceland cooperation. This led to her accreditation as the first Icelandic Ambassador in Belarus in over ten years. Berglind also attended the 2nd Global Fishery Forum and Seafood Expo in Saint Petersburg, during 2018. In 2020, Árni Þór Sigurðsson succeeded her as ambassador to Russia. In Moscow, she was a member of the Women Ambassadors Club, founded by Dutch diplomat Renée Jones-Bos.

From September to December 2021 Berglind was Visiting Scholar at the University of British Columbia Vancouver's Centre for Migration Studies. In 2022, Berglind was employed by the Icelandic Ministry of Higher Education, Industry and Innovation.

Preceded by Anders Wenström	Secretary-General of the Nordic Council; 1996–1996	Succeeded by Frida Nokken
