= Veitastrond =

Village in Luster Municipality, Norway

- Village
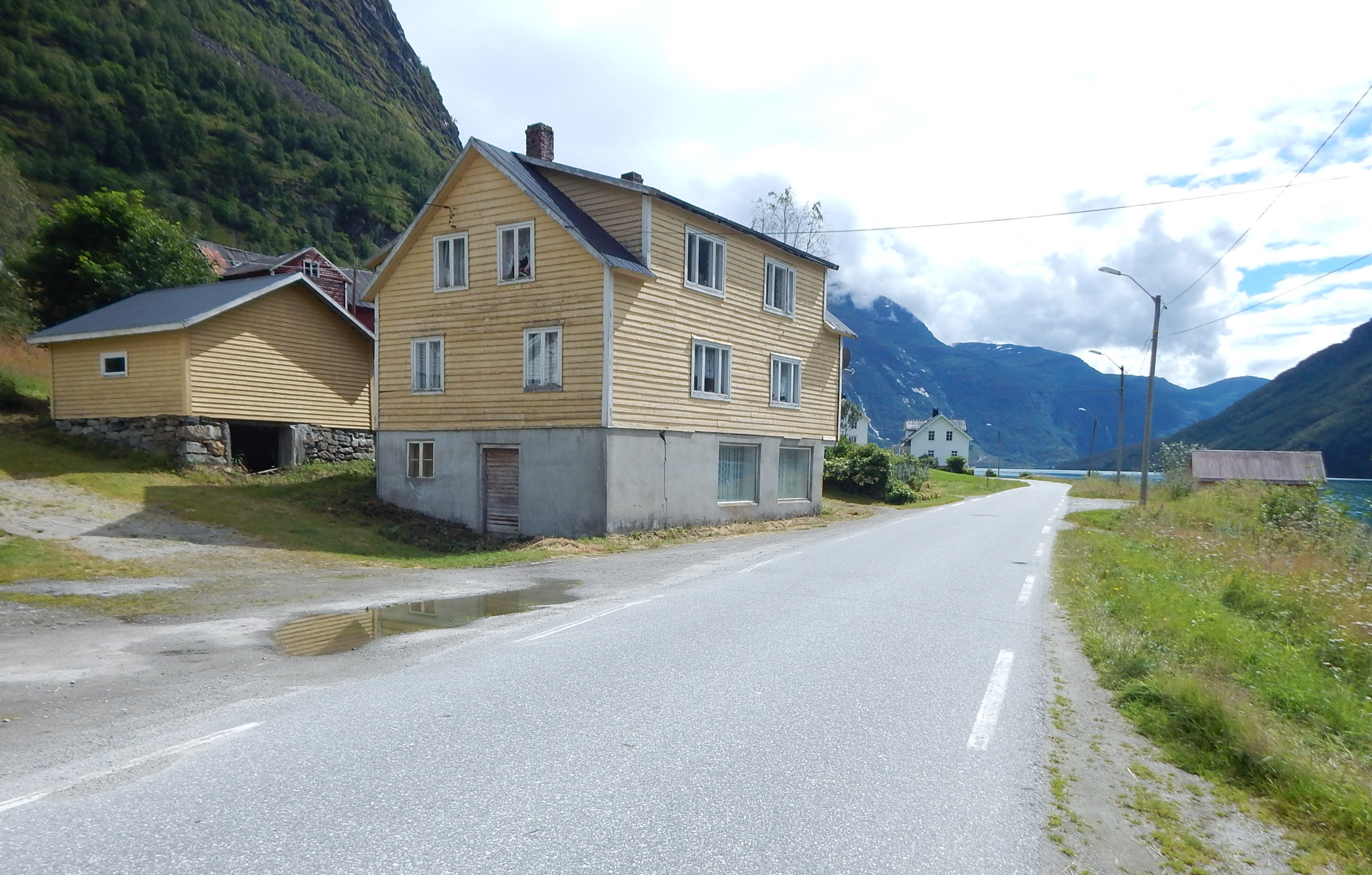
- Interactive map of Veitastrond
- Location within Vestland Location within Norway
- Coordinates: 61.50458°N 6.98577°E
- Country: Norway
- Region: Western Norway
- County: Vestland
- District: Sogn
- Municipality: Luster Municipality
- Elevation: 184 m (604 ft)
- Time zone: UTC+01:00 (CET)
  - Summer (DST): UTC+02:00 (CEST)
- Post Code: 6878 Veitastrond

Veitastrond is a small village in the western part of Luster Municipality in Vestland county, Norway. It is located near the Jostedalsbreen glacier, and Jostedalsbreen National Park surrounds the village on three sides. Veitastrond is located at the northern end of an isolated valley. There is only one road access to Veitastrond, a 30-kilometre (19 mi) long road heading northwest from the village of Hafslo, the nearest urban center. Veitastrond sits about 45 kilometres (28 mi) from the village of Gaupne, the municipal center.

The village has 123 inhabitants who share a small shop, a school (9 pupils), and Veitastrond Chapel. The economy is primarily based on agriculture. The Storelvi river passes by the village before emptying into the long lake Veitastrondsvatnet.

== History ==
Historically, Veitastrond was part of the old Hafslo Municipality from 1838 until 1 January 1963, when Hafslo Municipality merged into Luster Municipality.

== Notable people ==
- Kurt Heggestad, the former Sogndal-player hails from Veitastrond.
