= Elisabeth Berge =

Norwegian civil servant (1954–2020)

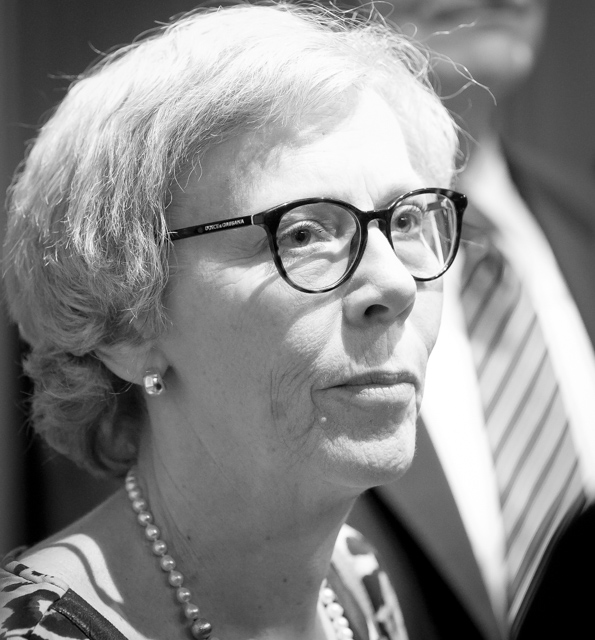
- Born: 27 November 1954
- Died: 12 April 2020 (aged 65)
- Education: Norwegian School of Economics and Business Administration; University of California
- Occupations: Businessperson and civil servant

Elisabeth Berge (27 November 1954 – 12 April 2020) was a Norwegian businessperson and civil servant.

She graduated with the siv.øk. degree from the Norwegian School of Economics and Business Administration in 1978, and as Master of Arts in Economics from the University of California in 1979. She worked in the Ministry of Petroleum and Energy from 1981 to 1990, since 1986 as a deputy under-secretary of State. She then worked in Statoil from 1990 to 2004, since 2001 as chief of communications. In 2004 she was appointed permanent under-secretary of State in the Ministry of Petroleum and Energy.

She was a member of the board of Statnett from 1992 to 2000 and the Kavli Foundation from 1999 to 2004. She died in 2020.

Civic offices
Preceded by Karl-Edwin Manshaus	Permanent under-secretary of state in the Norwegian Ministry of Petroleum and Energy; 2004–2019	Succeeded by Andreas Hilding Eriksen
