= Odd L. Fosseidbråten =

Norwegian civil servant and diplomat

Odd Lauritz Fosseidbråten (born 19 July 1946) is a Norwegian civil servant and diplomat.

He held the mag.art. degree (PhD equivalent) in political science and was hired by the Ministry of Foreign Affairs in 1973. He served as Norway's ambassador to Singapore from 1992 to 1996, and was the permanent under-secretary of state in the Norwegian Ministry of Trade and Industry, the highest-ranking bureaucratic position, from 1997 to 1999. He served as Norway's ambassador to Tokyo from 1999 to 2003 and Sweden from 2003 to 2009.

In 2000 he was decorated as a Commander of the Royal Norwegian Order of St. Olav.

Civic offices
Preceded by Karl-Edwin Manshaus	Permanent under-secretary of state in the Norwegian Ministry of Trade and Industry; 1997–1999	Succeeded by Jan Solberg
