= Jan Solberg =

Norwegian civil servant (born 1951)

Jan Solberg (born 3 March 1951) is a Norwegian civil servant.

A cand.polit. by education, he worked in the Ministry of Finance from 1979 to 1990. From 1990 to 1995 he served as director of the Norwegian Customs and Excise Authorities. From 1995 to 1999 he was the chief executive officer of Postbanken. He returned to the public sector in 1999 to work as permanent under-secretary of State in the Ministry of Trade and Industry. In 2005 he was hired as vice executive of SINTEF.

Civic offices
Preceded by Jens Sterri	Director of the Norwegian Customs and Excise Authorities; 1990–1995	Succeeded by Frida Nokken
Preceded by Odd L. Fosseidbråten	Permanent under-secretary of state in the Ministry of Trade and Industry; 1999–2005	Succeeded by Per Sanderud
