= Kurt Heggestad =

Norwegian footballer (born 1982)

Personal information
- Full name: Kurt Heggestad
- Date of birth: 19 August 1982 (age 44)
- Height: 1.77 m (5 ft 10 in)
- Positions: Left winger; left-back

Youth career
- –1998: Sogndal

Senior career*
Years	Team	Apps	(Gls)
1999–2007	Sogndal	112	(6)
2006	→ Årdal (loan)		
2008–2014	Veitastrond		

International career
1998	Norway U16	14	(3)
1999	Norway U17	4	(1)
- * Club domestic league appearances and goals

Kurt Heggestad (born 19 August 1982) is a Norwegian former professional footballer who played as a left winger or left-back. He represented Norway at the under-16 and under-17 level, and played 53 matches for Sogndal in Tippeligaen. Heggestad played for Sogndal for ten consecutive seasons, before he retired at the age of 26 to become a goat farmer

Kurt Heggestad has been a Manchester City supporter his whole life.

== Career ==
Heggestad hails from Veitastrond in Luster Municipality, and joined Sogndal at young age. He was regarded as one of the club most talented footballers, and was a contributor to the youth-team's regional championship in 1996. Heggestad was also called up for Norwegian youth teams and played 14 matches, scoring 3 goals for the under-16 team in 1998, and played four matches scoring one goal for the under-17 team the following year. Aged 16, he was taken up into Sogndal's first-team squad in 1999, and made his debut in the First Division the same year. Heggestad made two appearances as a substitute in the First Division in 2000, and he played the last 15 minutes of the play-off against Vålerenga when Sogndal won promotion to Tippeligaen.

Heggestad made his debut in Tippeligaen on 16 April 2001, when he replaced Julian Johnsson at half time in the match against Odd Grenland. Heggestad started his first match for Sogndal on 28 October 2001, and scored the team's second goal after an assist from Alexander Ødegaard when Bodø/Glimt was beaten 3–2. Heggestad played a total of six matches and scored one goal in his first season in Tippeligaen, and ahead of the next season, Sogndal rejected offers from Førde and Åsane to get Heggestad on loan.

In Heggestad's first four years at Sogndal, Tommy Øren was mostly chosen as the left winger in the starting line-up, while Heggestad was on the bench. Before the summer break of the 2003 season, Heggestad had only played 60 minutes, but when Øren was ruled out for the rest of the season with an injury, Heggestad was playing regularly. As Sogndal already had the wingers Øren, Ødegaard, Kim Tangedal and Kim Rune Hellesund, head coach Jan Halvor Halvorsen persuaded Heggestad to be retrained as a left-back ahead of the 2004 season. Sogndal was however relegated after the season, and during the four seasons in Tippeligaen Heggestad played a total of 53 matches. Heggestad joined the Second Division side Årdal on loan for the second half of the 2006 season. He returned to Sogndal in 2007, and played every match for the team in the First Division. Sogndal wanted to sign a new contract with Heggestad after the season, but he rejected the offer and stepped down from professional football at the age of 26. Instead he moved home to Veitastrond and became a goat farmer and played football for Veitastrond IL in the Fifth Division.
