= Language Council of Norway =

Norwegian government agency for language policy

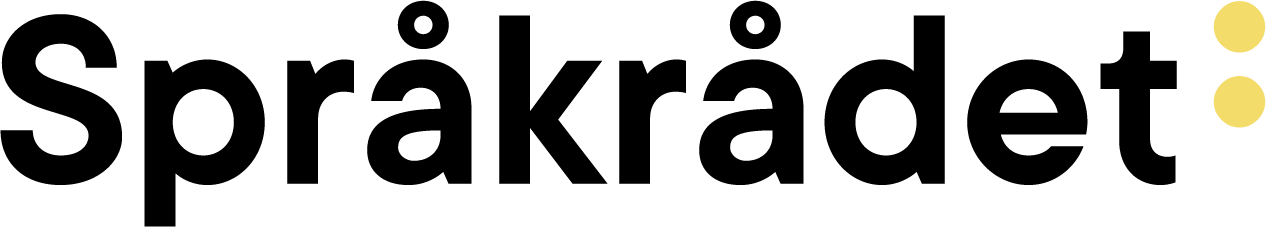
- Formation: 1 January 2005; 21 years ago
- Headquarters: Oslo, Norway
- Director: Åse Wetås
- Website: www.sprakradet.no

The Language Council of Norway (Norwegian: Språkrådet, Urban East Norwegian: [ˈsprôːkˌroːdə]) is the administrative body of the Norwegian state on language issues. It regulates the two written forms of the Norwegian language: Bokmål and Nynorsk. It was established in 2005 and replaced the Norwegian Language Council (Norsk språkråd, Urban East Norwegian: [ˈnɔ̀ʂk ˈsprôːkˌroːd]) which existed from 1974 to 2005. It is a subsidiary agency of the Ministry of Culture and has forty-four employees (as per 2023). It is one of two organisations involved in language standardization in Norway, alongside the Norwegian Academy.

== History ==
=== Norwegian Language Council ===
The Norwegian Language Council (1974–2005) had the task of safeguarding the cultural heritage represented by the Norwegian written and spoken language, promoting measures that can increase knowledge of the Norwegian language, promoting tolerance and mutual respect between everyone who uses the Norwegian language in its various variants, and protecting the rights of the individual person when it comes to the use of language. Among the most important tasks of the council were standardization of Bokmål and Nynorsk, linguistic advice and linguistic quality assurance of textbooks.

In 2000, the council was tasked with working with the Norwegian language and information technology. The Norwegian Language Council registered new words, put forward proposals for replacement words instead of English import words and promoted measures to ensure linguistic equality between Bokmål and Nynorsk. The council published the publications Språknytt and Statspråk.

It had 38 members, which represented different stakeholders, such as other language organisations including the Norwegian Academy, Riksmålsforbundet and Noregs Mållag, but also the educational sector and the media. The council created lists of acceptable word forms. Some words previously had two forms, the official form which were to be used in government documents and textbooks, and optional forms, which could be used by students in state schools. However, after 2005 this difference no longer exists in the lists published by the Language Council of Norway.

=== Language Council of Norway ===
In 2003, the Storting agreed to a proposal to transform the Norwegian Language Council into a national competence center for the Norwegian language. The new body was established on 1 January 2005. In May 2005, it was decided to name the institution the Language Council. It no longer represents the language organizations. In 2005, the Language Service for state bodies was also established following a decision in the Storting. The Language Service has two equal tasks: to promote plain language within the government and ensure more even distribution between Nynorsk and Bokmål in state documents.

Sylfest Lomheim served as the first director of the Council until 1 September 2010. Åse Wetås has been leading the Council since 2015.

=== Controversies ===
In 2006, the Norwegian newspaper Ny Tid requested that the council choose an alternative to the term "ethnic Norwegians" because the term might be alienating or exclusionary to immigrants to Norway. In response, the council denied that immigrants were Norwegians or could ever become Norwegians, writing: "We do not believe that there is a need to replace ‘ethnic Norwegian’ by another term. We believe it is incorrect to call people from other countries ‘Norwegians’ because ‘Norwegian’ by definition refers to someone of ethnic Norwegian descent. A Pakistani who settles in Norway does not become Norwegian, not even if he becomes a Norwegian citizen." The council's narrow definition of Norwegian identity sparked controversy in Norwegian news media and on Norwegian social media.

== The board ==
The Ministry of Culture has appointed the following board for the period 2020–2023:

- Board director: Erik Ulfsby (bokmål)
- Deputy director: Lodve Solholm (nynorsk)
- Terje Lohndal (bokmål)
- Eli Bjørhusdal (nynorsk)
- Lars Ivar Nordal (nynorsk)
- Torunn Reksten (bokmål)
- Employee representatives
