= Sylfest Lomheim =

Norwegian philologist (born 1945)

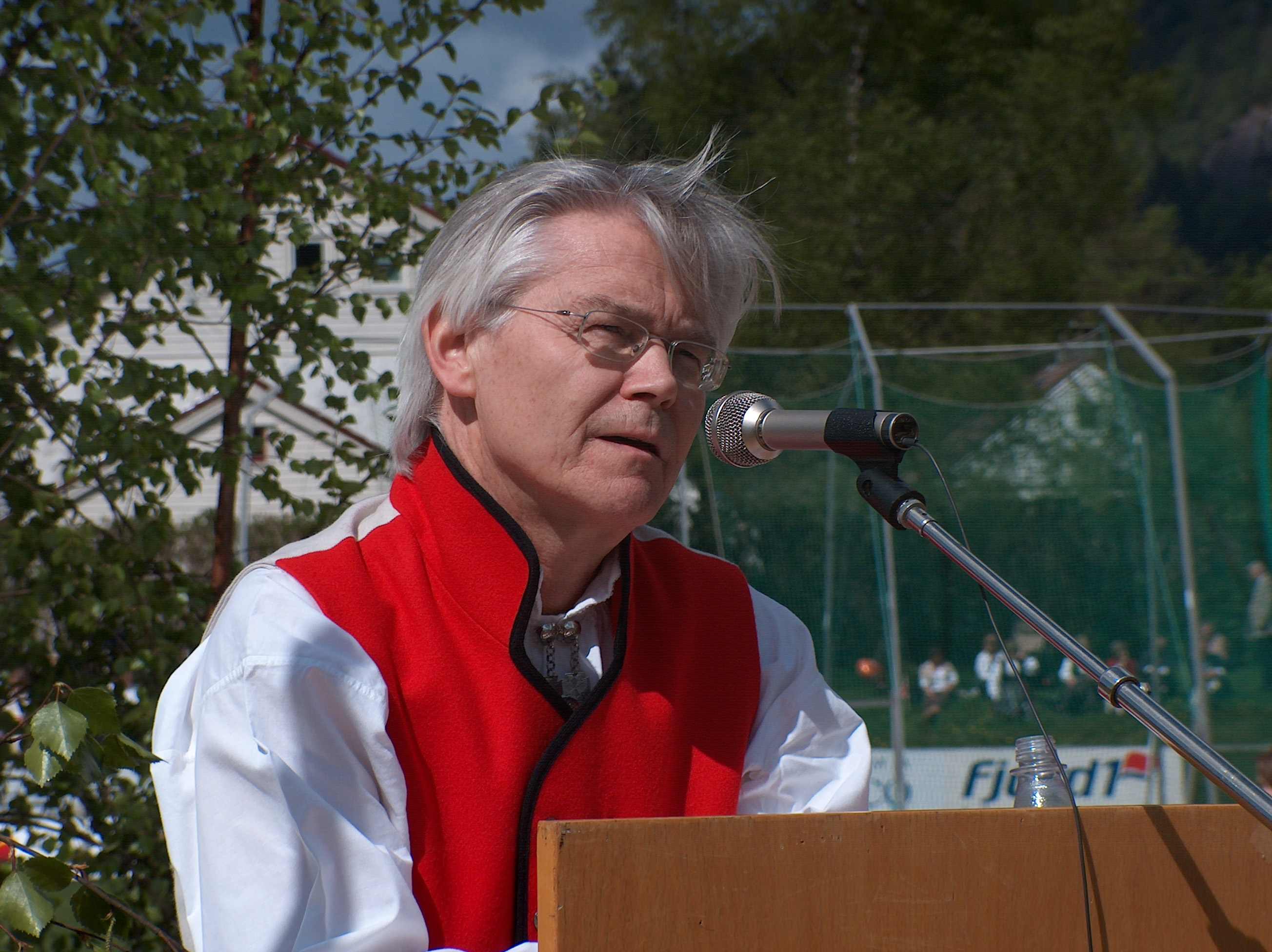
Sylfest Lomheim.

Sylfest Lomheim (born 11 March 1945 in Hafslo Municipality) is a Norwegian philologist.

He was the director of the Norwegian Language Council from 2003 to 2010. He is also associate professor (amanuensis) in the Norwegian language at the University of Agder. He was rector of its predecessor Agder Regional College from 1987 to 1992.

Lomheim has written works on translation and language standardisation, and has worked in the Norwegian Broadcasting Corporation since 1980, both in radio and TV.

In 1997, under the Jagland's Cabinet, he was appointed state secretary in the Ministry of Children and Family Affairs.

Academic offices
Preceded by Finn Holmer-Hoven	Rector of Agder Regional College; 1987–1992	Succeeded by Paul Flaa
Cultural offices
Preceded by	Director of the Norwegian Language Council; 2003–2010	Succeeded by Sigfrid Tvitekkja (acting)
