= Wilhelm Ohlandt =

Norwegian civil servant

Wilhelm Ohlandt (15 October 1886 – 8 December 1958) was a Norwegian civil servant.

He served as a deputy under-secretary of state in the Norwegian Ministry of Finance from 1929 to 1956, heading the customs department. For his long service he was decorated with the Royal Norwegian Order of St. Olav in 1957.
