= Jens Sterri =

Norwegian civil servant (1923–2008)

Jens K. Sterri (13 July 1923 – 1 September 2008) was a Norwegian civil servant.

Born in Hafslo Municipality as the fourth of ten children, he decided to study law. He graduated from the University of Oslo as cand.jur. in 1949, and worked as a secretary in the Ministries of Justice and Agriculture, as well as an attorney. In 1954 he became a secretary in the Ministry of Finance, advancing to assistant secretary in 1961 and deputy under-secretary of State in 1969. He was appointed director of the Norwegian Customs and Excise Authorities in 1977, and retired in 1990.

The same year he was proclaimed Commander with Star of the Order of St. Olav. He was also a Commander of the Order of the Lion of Finland and a Knight of the Order of the Falcon. He died in September 2008 at the age of 85.

Government offices
Preceded by Karl Trasti	Director of the Norwegian Customs and Excise Authorities; 1977–1990	Succeeded by Jan Solberg
