= Hafslovatnet =

Lake in Vestland, Norway

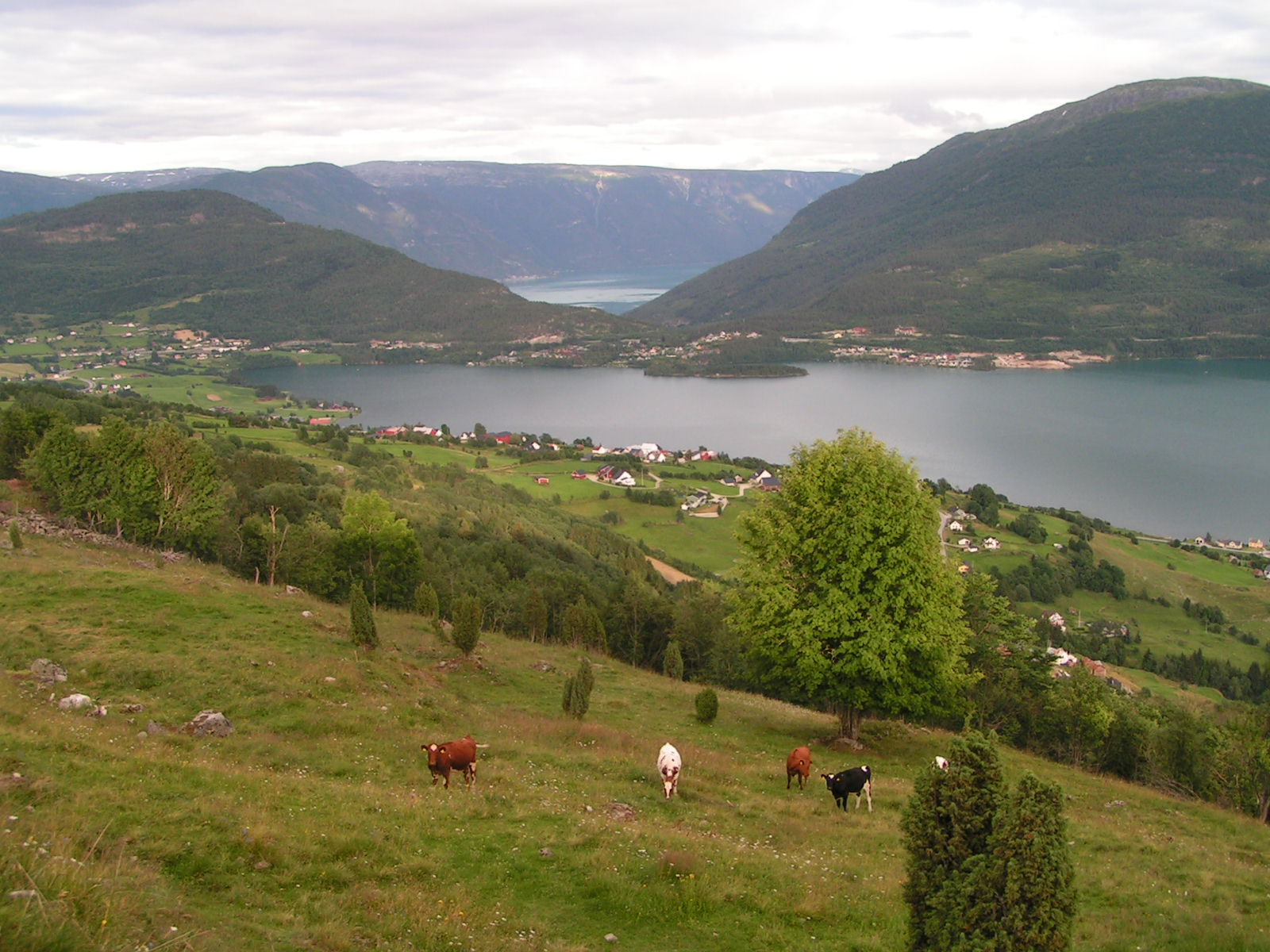
- Hafslovatnet with the Lustrafjord in the background
- Interactive map of Hafslovatnet
- Location: Luster Municipality, Vestland
- Coordinates: 61.30059°N 7.16956°E
- Primary inflows: Soget
- Primary outflows: Årøyelvi
- Basin countries: Norway
- Max. length: 8 kilometres (5.0 mi)
- Max. width: 1.5 kilometres (0.93 mi)
- Surface area: 5.97 km^{2} (2.31 sq mi)
- Average depth: 22 m (72 ft)
- Max. depth: 72.5 m (238 ft)
- Water volume: 130,432,000 m^{3} (4.6062×10^{9} cu ft)
- Surface elevation: 168 m (551 ft)
- Settlements: Hafslo
- References: NVE

Hafslovatnet is a lake in Luster Municipality in Vestland county, Norway.

The lake lies at an elevation of 168 m (551 ft), has a surface area of 5.97 km^{2} (2.31 sq mi), and a water volume of 130,432,000 m^{3} (4.6062×10^{9} cu ft). It serves as a reservoir for the hydroelectric power station in Årøy. The primary inflow of the Hafslovatnet is via the short river Soget from the lake Veitastrondsvatnet. The primary outflow is the river Årøyelvi, which flows south into the Barsnesfjord, an inner part of the Sogndalsfjord, which, in turn, is a northern branch of the Sognefjord.

The eponymous village of Hafslo lies at the northern shore of the lake. The eastern end of the lake lies at a distance of less than 2 km (1.2 mi) from the village of Solvorn, which lies at the northern shore of the Lustrafjorden. The western part of the lake lies in the bird reserve Hafslovatnet.

Panorama of Hafslovatnet with the village Hafslo visible across the lake in the center of the image

== See also ==
- List of lakes in Norway
