= Hafslo Church =

Church in Vestland, Norway

- Hafslo kyrkje
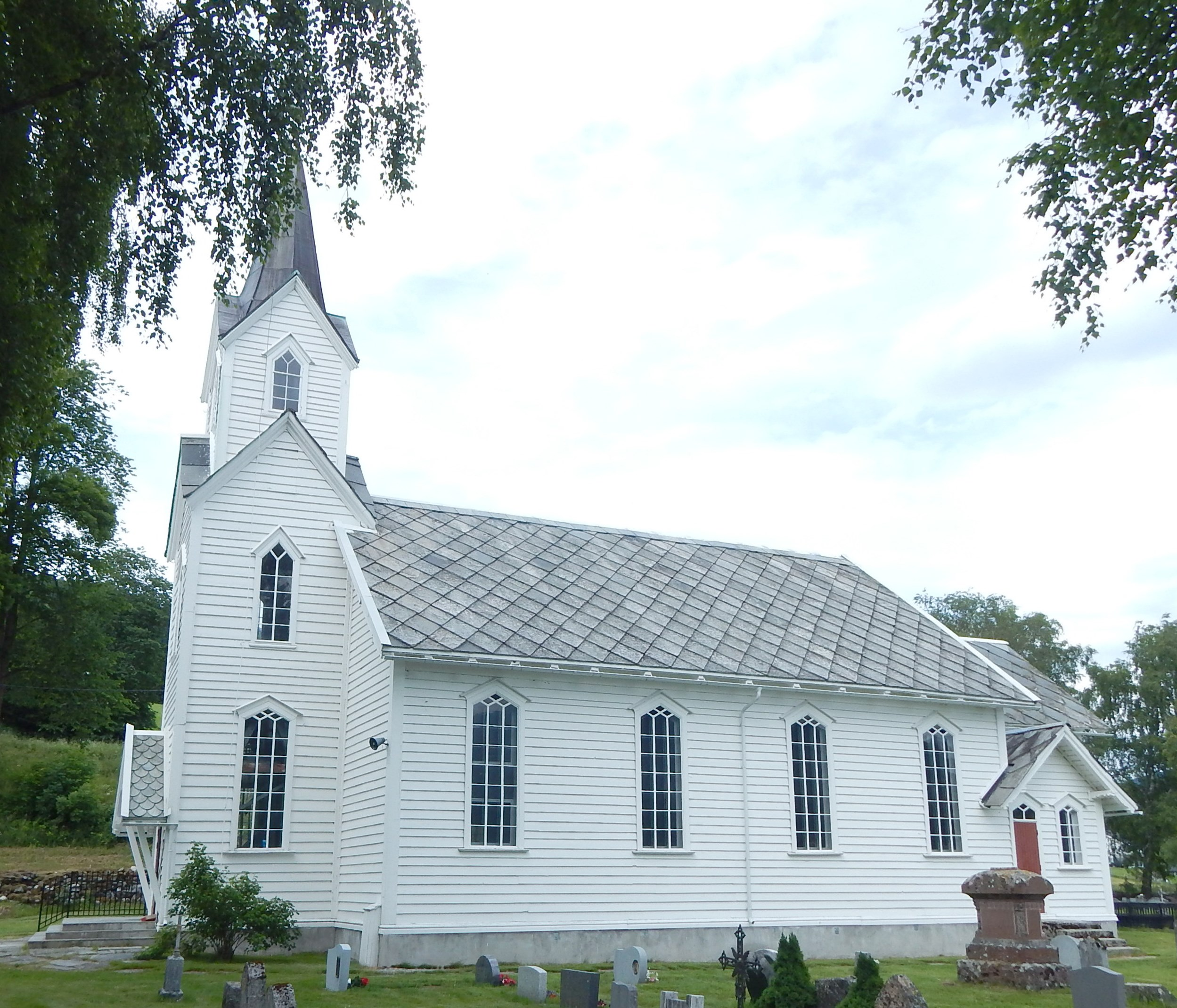
- View of the church
- Hafslo Church
- 61°18′39″N 7°11′08″E
- Location: Luster Municipality, Vestland
- Country: Norway
- Denomination: Church of Norway
- Churchmanship: Evangelical Lutheran

History
- Status: Parish church
- Founded: c. 1200
- Consecrated: 4 December 1878

Architecture
- Functional status: Active
- Architect: Johan D. Faye
- Architectural type: Long church
- Completed: 1878 (148 years ago)

Specifications
- Capacity: 300
- Materials: Wood

Administration
- Diocese: Bjørgvin bispedømme
- Deanery: Sogn prosti
- Parish: Hafslo
- Norwegian Cultural Heritage Site
- Type: Church
- Status: Not protected
- ID: 84459

Hafslo Church (Norwegian: Hafslo kyrkje) is a parish church of the Church of Norway in Luster Municipality in Vestland county, Norway. It is located in the village of Hafslo. It is the church for the Hafslo parish which is part of the Sogn prosti (deanery) in the Diocese of Bjørgvin. The white, wooden church was built in a long church design in 1878 using plans drawn up by the architect Johan D. Faye. The church seats about 300 people.

== History ==
The earliest existing historical records of the church date back to the year 1271, but the church was not built that year. The first church in Hafslo was a wooden stave church that was likely built around the year 1200. Over the centuries, the church had several renovations and expansions. In 1700, the choir of the church was torn down and a new, larger timber-framed choir was built in its place. In an inspection in 1722, the old church was measured. The nave measured about 13.8 by 9.5 metres (45 ft × 31 ft) and the choir measured about 9.5 by 7.5 metres (31 ft × 25 ft).

In 1814, this church served as an election church (Norwegian: valgkirke). Together with more than 300 other parish churches across Norway, it was a polling station for elections to the 1814 Norwegian Constituent Assembly which wrote the Constitution of Norway. This was Norway's first national elections. Each church parish was a constituency that elected people called "electors" who later met together in each county to elect the representatives for the assembly that was to meet at Eidsvoll Manor later that year.

The new church law in 1851 required churches to be large enough to seat a certain portion of the members in the parish. This church was too small according to that law. Plans were made to enlarge the church, an architect was hired, and contracts were signed. In January 1877, a week after the contracts were signed, the parish building committee changed its mind and it was decided to tear down the old church and build a new one. From 14 to 21 May 1878, the old church was torn down and construction was begun on a new Hafslo Church on the same site. The new church was built slightly to the side of where the previous church had stood. The new building was consecrated on 4 December 1878.

== See also ==
- List of churches in Bjørgvin
