= Norwegian Customs Service =

Norwegian government agency

Norwegian Customs Tolletaten
- Coat of arms

Agency overview
- Formed: 1957; 69 years ago
- Employees: 1,634
- Annual budget: kr 1,736 billion (2017)

Jurisdictional structure
- Operations jurisdiction: Norway
- Specialist jurisdiction: Customs, excise, gambling

Operational structure
- Headquarters: Schweigaards gate 15, Oslo, Norway
- Elected officer responsible: Trygve Slagsvold Vedum, Minister of Finance
- Agency executive: Øystein Børmer, Customs Director
- Parent agency: Ministry of Finance

Website
- www.toll.no/en

Norwegian Customs (Norwegian: Tolletaten) is a Norwegian government agency under the Ministry of Finance with responsibility for "protecting society against illegal importation and exportation of goods and to ensure government revenues by correct and timely payment of duties and taxes". Since 2017, the agency has been run by customs director Øystein Børmer.

== Organization ==
The agency is organized into a central directorate, The Directorate of Norwegian Customs (in Norwegian Tolldirektoratet), and six customs regions. The directorate's role is to develop customs regulations, support of the customs regions, and to act as the point of contact for the public. The headquarters of the directorate are located in Oslo.

In addition to customs services, the agency is responsible for performing tasks on behalf of other government agencies at the border, for example border control.

== History ==
Customs in Norway has a long history. Already during Harald Fairhair's reign (c. 865-933), customs were collected in the cities on behalf of the king on all imported and exported goods. Collection of customs continued through the middle ages, but there were still no designated customs officers. During the 1500s, customs were mainly collected by the lensmann, and by the 1630s a separate customs agency was established. Under Danish rule, Norwegian Customs were allowed to operate independently. Closer to the end of the union, the amtmenn (who were selected by the Danish king) had a supervisory role over the customs offices.

Following Norway's independence in 1814, the customs offices were under the control of different ministries, before it finally was put under the control of the Ministry of Finance in 1818. From 1929 to 1956 Wilhelm Ohlandt was head of the customs department. In 1957, the customs service was centralized into one agency, The Norwegian Directorate of Customs, which in 1974 changed its name to The Norwegian Directorate of Excise and Customs. In 2015, the role of collecting excise and Value-added tax was transferred to the Norwegian Tax Administration. Following this change, the name was changed to Customs Norway.

== Customs regions ==
- Customs region of Oslo and Akershus, Oslo
- Customs region of Eastern Norway, Fredrikstad
- Customs region of Southern Norway, Kristiansand
- Customs region of Western Norway, Bergen
- Customs region of Central Norway, Trondheim
- Customs region of Northern Norway, Tromsø
